= List of Dutch composers =

The following is a list of Dutch composers.

== A ==
- Michel van der Aa (born 1970)
- Emmanuel Adriaenssen (c. 1554 – 1604)
- Maarten Altena (born 1943)
- Hendrik Andriessen (1892–1981)
- Jurriaan Andriessen (1925–1996)
- Louis Andriessen (1939–2021)
- Willem Andriessen (1887–1964)
- Peter van Anrooy (1879–1954)
- Caroline Ansink (born 1959)
- Dina Appeldoorn (1884–1938)
- Joseph Ascher (1829–1869)
- Svitlana Azarova (born 1976)

== B ==
- Kees van Baaren (1906–1970)
- Harry Bannink (1929–1999)
- Josquin Baston (fl. 1542–1563)
- Sonja Beets (born 1953)
- Jeanne Beijerman-Walraven (1878–1969)
- Gerard Beljon (born 1952)
- Gilius van Bergeijk (born 1946)
- Gertrude van den Bergh (1793–1840)
- Bart Berman (born 1938)
- Konrad Boehmer (1941–2014)
- Rob du Bois (1934–2013)
- Cornelis de Bondt (born 1953)
- Cornelis Boscoop (before 1531–1573)
- Henriëtte Hilda Bosmans (1895–1952)
- Jan Brandts Buys (1868–1933)
- Johannes Bernardus van Bree (1801–1857)
- Theo Bruins (1929–1993)
- Benedictus Buns (1642–1716)
- Pieter Bustijn (c. 1649 – 1729)

== C ==
- Jozef Cleber (1916–1999)
- Jacob Clemens non Papa (c. 1510/1515 – c. 1555)
- Catharina Clement (born 1998)
- Anna Cramer (1873–1968)

== D ==
- Ghiselin Danckerts (c. 1510 – c. 1565)
- Lex van Delden (1919–1988)
- Patrick van Deurzen (born 1964)
- Alphons Diepenbrock (1862–1921)
- Bernard van Dieren (1887–1936)
- Rudi Martinus van Dijk (1932–2003)
- Oscar van Dillen (born 1958)
- Jakob van Domselaer (1890–1960)
- Cornelis Dopper (1870–1939)
- Sem Dresden (1881–1957)

== E ==
- Margriet Ehlen (born 1943)
- Douwe Eisenga (born 1961)
- Huib Emmer (born 1951)
- Ivo van Emmerik (born 1961)
- Rudolf Escher (1912–1980)
- Jacob van Eyck (c. 1590 – 1657)

== F ==
- Martinus Fabri (fl. 1395–1400)
- Willem de Fesch (1687–1761)
- Eduard Flipse (1896–1973)
- Carel Anton Fodor (1768–1846)
- Wim Franken (1922–2012)
- Géza Frid (1904–1989)
- Joep Franssens (born 1955)

== G ==
- Jan van Gilse (1881–1944)
- Christian Ernst Graf (1723–1804)
- Cor de Groot (1914–1993)
- Jean-Pierre Guiran (born 1957)

== H ==
- Carolus Hacquart (c. 1640 – 1701?)
- Richard Hageman (1881–1966)
- Walter Hekster (1937–2012)
- Pieter Hellendaal (1721–1799)
- Gerard Hengeveld (1910–2001)
- Hans Henkemans (1913–1995)
- Jonny Heykens (1884–1945)
- Rozalie Hirs (born 1965)
- Charles Hofmann (1763–1823)
- Richard Hol (1825–1904)
- Simeon ten Holt (1923–2012)
- Joachim van den Hove (c. 1567 – 1620)
- Constantijn Huygens (1596–1687)

== I ==
- Jan Ingenhoven (1876-1951)

== J ==
- Guus Janssen (born 1951)
- Willem Jeths (born 1959)

== K ==
- Pierre Kartner (1935–2022)
- Johann Andreas Kauchlitz Colizzi (c. 1742 – 1808)
- José Kessels (1856–1928)
- Tristan Keuris (1946–1996)
- Jan Kleinbussink (born 1946)
- Gerard Kockelmans (1925–1965)
- Hans Kockelmans (born 1956)
- Jan Koetsier (1911–2006)
- Servaes de Koninck (c. 1654 – c. 1701)
- Roland Kuit (born 1959)
- Andreas Kunstein (born 1967)

== L ==
- Guillaume Landré (1905–1968)
- Vanessa Lann (born 1968)
- Reinbert de Leeuw (1938–2020)
- Ton de Leeuw (1926–1996)
- Rick van der Linden (1946–2006)
- Theo Loevendie (born 1930)
- Martin Lo-A-Njoe (born 1969)
- Arjen Anthony Lucassen (born 1960)
- Erik van der Luijt (born 1970)

== M ==
- Bert Matter (born 1937)
- Daan Manneke (born 1939)
- Joris de Man (born 1972)
- Tera de Marez Oyens (1932–1996)
- Johan de Meij (born 1953)
- Chiel Meijering (born 1954)
- Misha Mengelberg (1935–2017)
- Willem Mengelberg (1871–1951)
- Carlos Micháns (born 1950)
- Fred Momotenko (born 1970)

== N ==
- Anthoni van Noordt (c. 1619 – 1675)

== O ==
- Cornélie van Oosterzee (1863–1943)
- Léon Orthel (1905–1985)
- Willem van Otterloo (1907–1978)

== P ==
- Cornelis Thymenszoon Padbrué (c. 1592 – 1670)
- Martijn Padding (born 1956)
- Jan Gerard Palm (1831–1906)
- Paul Panhuysen (1934–2015)
- David Petersen (c. 1651 – 1737)
- Jan Pijnenburg (1955–2026)
- Willem Pijper (1894–1947)
- Edouard Potjes (1860–1931)
- Jacques Presburg (1881–1943)

== R ==
- Dick Raaijmakers (1930–2013)
- Ernst Reijseger (born 1954)
- Catharina van Rennes (1858–1940)
- Richard Rijnvos (born 1964)
- Julius Röntgen (1855–1932)
- Joey Roukens (born 1982)
- Daniel Ruyneman (1886-1953)

== S ==
- Samuel Maju Samehtini (1816–1879)
- Dirk Schäfer (1873–1931)
- Peter Schat (1935–2003)
- Johannes Schenck (1660 – c. 1712)
- Tjako van Schie (born 1961)
- Martinus Sieveking (1867–1950)
- Bernhard van den Sigtenhorst Meyer (1888–1953)
- Edouard Silas (1827–1909)
- Leo Smit (1900–1943)
- Carolus Souliaert (fl.1530)
- Harry Sparnaay (1944–2017)
- Pieter van der Staak (1930–2007)
- Jan Pieterszoon Sweelinck (1562–1621)

== T ==
- Edward Top (born 1972)
- Klas Torstensson (born 1951)
- Merlijn Twaalfhoven (born 1976)

== V ==
- Jacob ter Veldhuis (born 1951)
- Theo Verbey (1959–2019)
- Johannes Verhulst (1816–1891)
- Matthijs Vermeulen (1888–1967)
- Henk de Vlieger (born 1953)
- Henk van der Vliet (born 1928)
- Auguste van Biene (1849–1913)
- Alexander Voormolen (1895–1980)
- Jan Vriend (born 1938)
- Klaas de Vries (born 1944)

== W ==
- Peter-Jan Wagemans (born 1952)
- Diderik Wagenaar (born 1946)
- Johan Wagenaar (1862–1941)
- Unico Wilhelm van Wassenaer (1692–1766)
- Johann Wilhelm Wilms (1772–1847)
- Carl Wittrock (born 1966)

== Z ==
- Kristoffer Zegers (born 1973)
- Bernard Zweers (1854–1924)

== See also ==
- Lists of composers
- List of Belgian classical composers
