= Matthijs Vermeulen Award =

Dutch composition award

- Awarded for: "Dutch composer who has composed an important piece in the field of contemporary music."
- Sponsored by: Amsterdam Arts Fund (1972–2004); Performing Arts Fund (Since 2009)
- Country: Netherlands
- Presented by: Performing Arts Fund
- Reward: €20,000
- First award: 1972
- Website: www.fondspodiumkunsten.nl/en/activities/the_matthijs_vermeulen_award/

The Matthijs Vermeulen Award is the most important Dutch composition prize. It was named after the Dutch composer Matthijs Vermeulen (1888–1967).

During the years 1972 through 2004, the prize was awarded annually by the Amsterdam Foundation for the Arts. The award was discontinued from 2005, when the Amsterdam Foundation merged it with the Amsterdam Award for the Arts (Amsterdamprijs voor de Kunst).

In March 2009, the Nederlands Foundation for Stage Arts announced it will renew the prize. The prize money is €20,000. Since its launch, the prize has been awarded twenty times more often to male than female composers (of all prize winners, 95% are male).

== List of award winners ==
- 1972: Jan van Vlijmen (Omaggio a Gesualdo)
- 1973: Peter Schat (To You)
- 1974: Willem Breuker (Het paard van Troje)
- 1975: Tristan Keuris (Sinfonia)
- 1976: not awarded
- 1977: Louis Andriessen (De Staat)
- 1978: Jeugd en Muziek (Zeeland) / Leo Cuypers (Zeelandsuite)
- 1979: Otto Ketting (Symphony for saxophones and orchestra)
- 1980: Jan van Vlijmen (Quatemi)
- 1981: Jan Boerman (whole oeuvre)
- 1982: Ton de Leeuw (Car mes vignes sont en fleur)
- 1983: Klaas de Vries (Discantus)
- 1984: Guus Janssen (Ternet)
- 1985: Dick Raaymakers (Extase)
- 1986: Theo Loevendie (Naima)
- 1987: Gottfried Michael Koenig
- 1988: Joep Straesser (Über Erich M.)
- 1989: Jacques Bank (Requiem voor een levende)
- 1990: Peter-Jan Wagemans (Rosebud)
- 1991: Klas Torstensson (Stick on Stick)
- 1992: Louis Andriessen (M. is for Man, Music and Mozart; Facing Death, Dances, Hout en Lacrimosa)
- 1993: Robert Heppener (Im Gestein)
- 1994: Dick Raaymakers (Der Fall/Dépons; Die glückliche Hand — Geöffnet)
- 1995: not awarded
- 1996: Diderik Wagenaar (Trois Poèmes; Prose)
- 1997: Ton de Leeuw (Three Shakespeare Songs)
- 1998: Klaas de Vries (A king, riding en Interludium for string orchestra)
- 1999: Ron Ford (Salome Fast)
- 2000: Richard Rijnvos (Times Square Dance)
- 2001: Misha Mengelberg (Opera 2000)
- 2002: Peter-Jan Wagemans (Moloch)
- 2003: Richard Ayres (No. 36 NONcerto)
- 2004: Michel van der Aa (One)
- 2005–2008: not awarded
- 2009: Boudewijn Tarenskeen (Mattheus Passie)
- 2011: Richard Rijnvos (Die Kammersängerin)
- 2013: Jan van de Putte (Kagami-Jishi for piano solo and orchestra)
- 2015: Peter Adriaansz (Scala II)
- 2017: Kate Moore (The Dam)
- 2019: Aart Strootman (Shambling Emerge – after party)
- 2021: Calliope Tsoupaki (Thin Air)
- 2023: Pete Harden (M.M.)
- 2025: Trevor Grahl (Śpiewnik)
