= Kockelmans =

Kockelmans is a surname. Notable people with the surname include:

- Gerard Kockelmans (1925–1965), Dutch composer, conductor, and music teacher
- Hans Kockelmans (born 1956), Dutch composer, teacher, and performer
- Joseph Kockelmans (1923–2008), Dutch-born American philosopher and academic

== See also ==
- Kockelman, another surname
