= Jan Ingenhoven =

Dutch composer and conductor

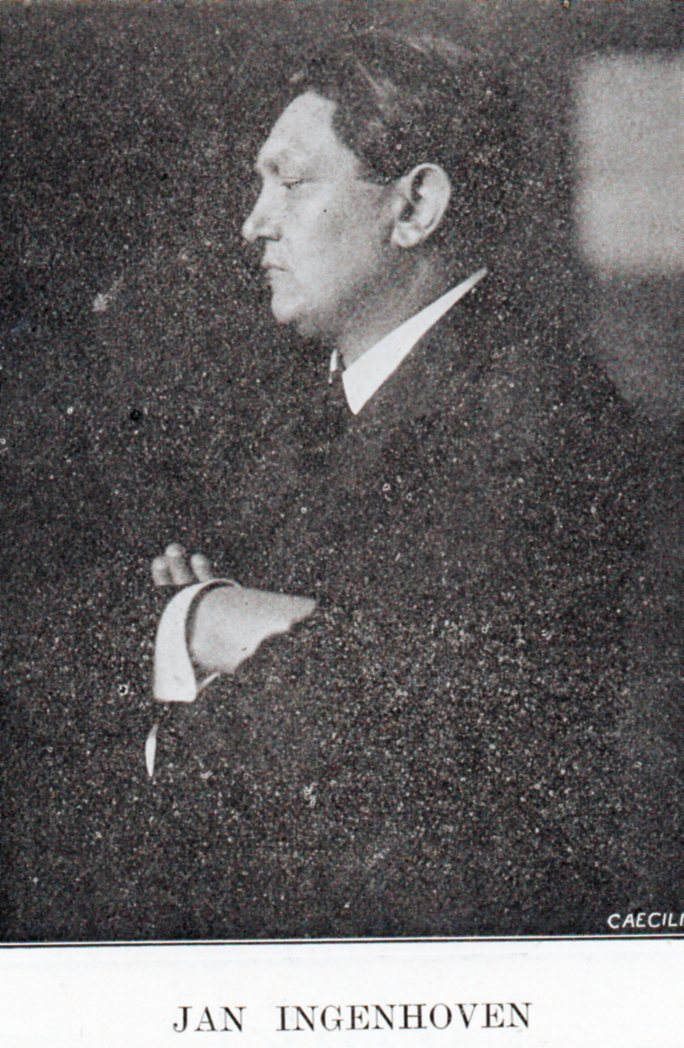
Image of Jan Ingenhoven

Johannes Theodorus (Jan) Ingenhoven (Breda, 19 May 1876 – Hoenderloo, 20 May 1951), was a Dutch composer and conductor. He was one of the first to introduce new influences shaping twentieth century European music into the Netherlands before World War 1, and also took contemporary Dutch music into Germany.

== Career ==
Jan Ingenhoven was born into a family of gifted amateur musicians: his father (a baker) played oboe and violin and an uncle played the saxophone. He learned the clarinet at an early age, sang in a choir and was soon conducting local choirs in Breda and Dordrecht. From 1902 he studied harmony and composition with Ludwig Felix Brandts Buys (1847–1917). After his marriage to Johanna Hermine Frantzmann in 1905 he settled in Munich and continued his studies with the Austrian conductor Felix Mottl.

Ingenhoven promoted Dutch music abroad, organizing a Dutch Music Festival in Munich in 1906 that included his own music and pieces by his contemporaries Alphons Diepenbrock, Johan Wagenaar and Carl Smulders (1863–1934). The following year he put on a similar festival in Berlin, introducing music by Anna Cramer, Kor Kuiler (1877–1951) and Cornélie van Oosterzee.

Between 1906 and 1909 he conducted the Münchner Orchester Verein and the Dutch Philharmonic Orchestra. He also led the Münchner Madrigal Vereinigung choir (1909–12), with which he toured successfully across Europe. After 1915 he moved to Switzerland (Lake Thun) and also spent time in Paris. His wife died in 1929 and after that Ingenhoven composed very little. He donated his Swiss house to the Dutch Association for Contemporary Music in 1937, moving to Darmstadt for a short time before settling back in the Netherlands. He retired to the Veluwe district, where he died in 1951, aged 75.

== Music ==
Ingenhoven composed orchestral music in a late Romantic style, comparable to Franz Schmidt, Richard Strauss and Alexander Zemlinsky. Typical are the three orchestral Symphonic Poems (Lyrical, Dramatic, Romantic) composed between 1905 and 1908: the second of these was performed three times by the Concertgebouw Orchestra in September 1915, conducted by Evert Cornelis. Other large scale orchestral pieces in much the same vein are the Symphonische Fantasie über Zarathustras (1906) and the Symphonische Fantasie Brabant and Holland (1910–11).

A more original side of his work is seen in his songs, vocal quartets and choral music. The song cycle Blumenlieder (1907–8) - seven flower songs with words by various authors - experiments with a declamatory style which closely reflects the accents, relative lengths and inflections of the text. The vocal quartet ‘Nous n’irons plus au bois’ (1909) from the 4 quatuors à voix mixtes, was claimed by Ingenhoven to be the first atonal vocal work by a Dutch composer. The choral settings put an emphasis on intricate polyphony, derived both from Renaissance music and his contemporary Max Reger.

Ingenhoven also composed much chamber music, including three String Quartets, a Quintet for woodwind, a Clarinet Sonata, two Violin Sonatas, two Cello Sonatas, and various combinations of trios. His later music showed an increasing influence from French music (particularly Debussy) and a turning away from Romanticism to a more objective style. In particular, the later chamber works combine his interest in polyphony with a more homophonic approach, harmonically ambiguous with long melismatic melodies of little thematic function.

His work as a composer was admired by contemporaries such as Matthijs Vermeulen, Willem Landré and Daniël Ruyneman, but after his German period Ingenhoven himself did little to promote his compositions.

== Selected works ==
- 4 quatuors à voix mixtes (1903–9)
- Symphonic Poem No. 1 Lyrical, for small orchestra (1905)
- Symphonic Fantasy on "Zarathustra's Night Song" for bass soloist and orchestra (1906)
- Symphonic Poem No. 2, Dramatic for orchestra (1907)
- Three movements for string quartet (1907–08)
- Blumenlieder, (Flower Songs), song cycle (1907–8)
- Two songs with piano accompaniment: Evening Serenade, The Dreaming Lake (1908)
- Symphonic Poem No. 3, Romantic for small orchestra (1908)
- Sint Jansvier (words Guido Gezelle), a capella choir (1909)
- Klaus Tink, ballade for baritone and small orchestra (1909)
- Nordic landscape for male voices, soloists and orchestra (1910)
- Symphonic Fantasy on "Brabant en Holland" for orchestra (1910-11)
- String Quartet in One Movement (1911)
- Quintet, op. 23 for flute, oboe, clarinet, horn and bassoon (1911)
- An die Nacht (words Clemens Brentano), four part a capella choir (1911)
- String Quartet No. 3 (1912)
- Pièces pour 3 instruments divers No. 1, piano trio, 1912–13
- Symphonic Concerto for violin, cello, piano and chamber orchestra (1912-13)
- Mietje (words Guido Gezelle), four part a capella choir (1913)
- Pièces pour 3 instruments divers No. 2, flute, clarinet, harp, 1914–15
- Clarinet Sonata (1916-17)
- Pièces pour 3 instruments divers No. 3, violin, cello, harp, 1918
- Cello Sonata No. 1 (1919)
- Violin Sonata No. 1 (1919-20)
- Violin Sonata No. 2 (1921)
- Cello Sonata No. 2, Quasi una fantasia (1922)
- Four pieces for flute, oboe, clarinet, bassoon, 2 horns, timpani and strings (1924)
- Three movements for three clarinets, three oboes and piano (1924-25)
- The wild wind (words Guido Gezelle), for a capella male voices (1926)
- String Trio (Präludium - Intermezzo - Finale) (published 1928)
- What a silence, for a capella male voices
