= Abbie de Quant =

Dutch musician

Abbie de Quant (born 1946, The Hague) is a Dutch flautist. She taught at the music academies of Amsterdam and Utrecht and had her own bi-annual concert series at the Concertgebouw of Amsterdam.

Abbie de Quant studied with Koos Verheul at the Music Academy of Tilburg and graduated summa cum laude in 1970. She took a masterclass at the Accademia Musicale Chigiana in Siena with Severino Gazzelloni, where she received the Di Onore diploma.

As a soloist, De Quant has performed with nearly all Dutch orchestras. She won prizes at many national and international competitions. De Quant performs with pianists Elizabeth van Malde, Bart Berman, and Bernd Brackman, and with other instrumentalists and vocalists.

Among her many students are Caroline Ansink, Karin Bastings, Anne Brackman, Albert Brouwer, Felicia van den End, Herman van Kogelenberg, Marilou Krouwel, and Eleonore Pameijer.

== Discography ==
=== 1960s & 1970s ===
- 1966 Ton de Leeuw: Night music for flute (Composers' Voice)
- 197? Carl Philipp Emanuel Bach: Flute Concerto in G major (EMI)
- 1972 Carl Philipp Emanuel Bach: Concerto for flute, strings and harpsichord in D minor (EMI)
- 1973 Opus 72: An anthology of new Dutch music that made its mark in 1972 (Radio Nederland)
- 1975 Works for flute and harp (EMI)
- 1976 Otto Ketting: Time machine (Composers' Voice)
- 1976 Opus 75: Dutch avant-garde music that came to prominence in 1975 (Radio Nederland)

=== 1980s & 1990s ===
- 198? Sonata for flute and piano (Composers' Voice)
- 1981 Flute music (Composers' Voice)
- 1987 Transcriptions & variations for flute and harp (A-Selectie)
- 1993 Concertos for flute and oboe (Voorzieningsfonds voor Kunstenaars)
- 1993 Caroline Ansink, Lucebert: Oh beminnelijk litteken (Erasmus)
- 1995 Philippe Gaubert: Sonata (Erasmus)
- 1998 Kanzone: Romantic music for flute and piano (Etcetera)
- 1998 Huub Oosterhuis: Groter dan ons hart (Leerhuis en Liturgie)

=== 2000s ===
- 2000 Sunday afternoon concerts in the Amstelkerk (Brigadoon Vocal)
- 2002 Serenade – Songs without words (Etcetera)
- 2006 Hommage à Poulenc (FineLine)
- 2009 Music in Motion (FineLine)
