= Gerard Beljon =

Dutch musician and composer

- Born: 1952 (age 72–73); Utrecht, Netherlands
- Genres: Chamber
- Occupation: Composer
- Instrument(s): Lute, guitar
- Website: http://www.gerardbeljon.nl/index.htm

Gerard Beljon (born 16 April 1952, in Utrecht) is a musician and composer from the Netherlands, specialising in chamber and choral music with contemporary resonances. His works have been performed in Austria, Australia, Germany, Netherlands, Russia and the United States.

== Education ==
Beljon studied both lute and guitar at the Utrechts Conservatorium and the Royal Conservatory of The Hague. He studied composition under Carlos Michans and Daan Manneke.

== Career ==
Beljon's musical career has been primarily devoted to composition, which he studied with Daan Manneke at the Sweelinck Conservatory in Amsterdam. According to Donemus, the Dutch institute dealing with the documentation of contemporary music composed in the Netherlands, Clear and comprehensible forms and structures are an important basis for his work which combines innovative compositional and instrumental techniques that are characteristic of the notated music of the twentieth century, with influences from the world of pop music among others.

He has written compositions for soloists and ensembles such as the Orkest de Volharding, the Amsterdam Quintet, The Amstel Saxophone Quartet, Nederlands Kamerkoor (Dutch Chamber Choir), the Nieuw Ensemble, pianist Ralph van Raat, and the Calefax Rietkwintet. His works have been performed in Austria, Australia, Germany, Netherlands, Russia, and the United States.

=== Theatre ===
Beljon worked as a composer on several theatre productions and wrote the children's opera Hansel and Gretel (2001).

== Awards ==
- Aroma (1997) guitar and mandolin. This was awarded first prize for composition for contemporary music in Vienna in 2003.

== Works ==
- Beat for piano
- Heksenmuziek (Witch Music) (scene from Hansel and Gretel).
- Herschepping (Re-creation), for Chamber Choir and Harp; based on poem Herschepping from Gerrit Achterberg
- Aroma (1997) for guitar and mandolin.
- Beat (2003) for Piano Solo
- Nachtzien (Night show) (2003) Nederlands Kamerkoor in Beurs van Berlage in Amsterdam, 17 Dec 2003
- De tuin sneeuwt langzaam vol (The garden slowly fills with snow) (2003) Nederlands Kamerkoor in the Beurs van Berlage in Amsterdam, 17 Dec 2003
- Morgen (2004) for Soprano, Ensemble & Electronics
- The Cry of the Peacocks, 2005, for chamber choir. Based on a poem by Wallace Stevens (1879-1955). Written for the Nederlands Kamerkoor, first performance in Muziekgebouw aan 't IJ in December 2005; latest performance by the Nederlands Studenten Kamerkoor in the Amsterdam Concertgebouw on 5 Mar 2016.
- Didgeridoo 2007 Chamber music for organ and saxophone quartet.
- Sun (2007), first performed by the Limburgs Symfonie Orkest (Limburg Symphony Orchestra) at the Muziekcentrum Vredenburg in Utrecht on 26 Mar 2007.
