= Hendrik Andriessen =

Dutch composer, organist, and music educator

Hendrik Franciscus Andriessen
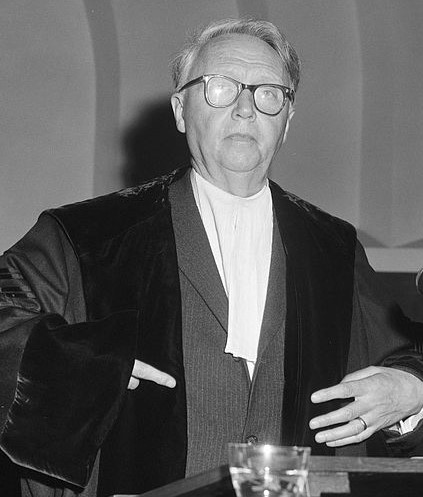
- Andriessen (1963)
- Born: 17 September 1892
- Died: 12 April 1981 (aged 88)
- Occupations: composer and organist

Hendrik Franciscus Andriessen (17 September 1892 – 12 April 1981) was a Dutch composer and organist. He is remembered most of all for his improvisation at the organ and for the renewal of Catholic liturgical music in the Netherlands. Andriessen composed in a musical idiom that revealed strong French influences. He was the brother of pianist and composer Willem Andriessen and the father of the composers Jurriaan Andriessen and Louis Andriessen and of the flautist Heleen Andriessen.

== Life and career ==
Andriessen was born in Haarlem, the son of Gezina Johanna (Vester), a painter, and Nicolaas Hendrik Andriessen, a church organist. He studied composition with Bernard Zweers and organ with Jean-Baptiste de Pauw at the Conservatorium van Amsterdam. As the organist at St. Catherine's Cathedral, Utrecht, he became well known for his improvisation abilities. From 1926 to 1954, he lectured in composition and music theory at the Amsterdam Conservatory while also teaching at the Institute for Catholic Church Music in Utrecht between 1930 and 1949. He was the director of the Utrecht Conservatory from 1937 to 1949.

During World War II, Andriessen refused to join the "Cultural House" (Kultuurkamer) and was thus barred from public functions by the Nazi occupiers. The only musical activities he was allowed were to give lessons and to accompany church services. He was held hostage in Kamp Sint-Michielsgestel by German occupiers from 13 July until 18 December 1942, when he was released.

In 1949, he was appointed director of the Royal Conservatory in The Hague, a post he held until 1957. Prior to this appointment he began there as professor of composition where amongst his several composition students at the Royal Conservatory Rudi Martinus van Dijk was included. Between 1954 and 1962, he was appointed an Extraordinary Professor of Musicology at the Catholic University of Nijmegen.

Andriessen's works included eight masses, a setting of the Te Deum, four symphonies, variations for orchestra, lieder for voice and orchestra, chamber music, sonatas for cello and for piano, and works for solo organ. He died in Haarlem.

== Selected works ==
=== Orchestra ===
- Symphony No. 1 (1930)
- Variations and Fugue on a Theme of Johann Kuhnau, for string orchestra (1935)
- Symphony No. 2 (1937)
- Capriccio for orchestra (1941)
- Variations on a Theme by Couperin for solo flute, string orchestra, and harp (1944)
- Symphony No. 3 (1946)
- Ricercare (1949) (also arranged for wind orchestra, 1977)
- Wilhelmus Rhapsody (1950)
- Concerto for Organ and Orchestra (1950)
- Symphonic Etude (1952)
- Libertas venit – Rhapsody (1954)
- Symphony No. 4 (1954)
- Symphonie Concertante for Violin, Viola & Orchestra (1962)
- Mascherata (1962)
- Violin Concerto (1969)
- Cello Concertino (1970)
- Oboe Concertino (1970)
- Chromatic Variations (1970)
- Canzone for Cello & Strings (1971)
- Chantecler Overture (1972)
- Hymnus in Pentecostem (1976)

=== Wind orchestra ===
- Ricercare (1977) (rev. from 1949 orchestral work)

=== Chamber ===
- 1914 Sonata, for violin and piano (lost)
- 1924 Sonatina, for viola and piano
- 1926 Sonata, for cello and piano = Sonate pour violoncelle et piano [a Thomas Canivez]
- 1932 Sonata No. 2 for violin and piano
- 1937 Drie Inventionen for violin & cello
- 1938 Sérénade, for flute/violin, violin/oboe en cello/bassoon
- 1939 Piano Trio
- 1950 Intermezzo for flute & harp
- 1950 Suite for violin and piano I. Preludio, II. Fuguetta, III. Air Varié, IV. Finale
- 1951 Quintet, for Woodwind Quintet
- 1952 Ballade for oboe & piano
- 1957 Quartetto in stile antico for String Quartet
- 1961 Il pensiero for string quartet
- 1967 Tre Pezzi, for flute and harp
- 1967 Sonata for viola & piano
- 1969 L'Indifferent, for String Quartet
- 1970 Serenade for flute, horn, and piano
- 1972 Divertimento a cinque, for flute, oboe, violin, viola and cello
- 1973 Choral Varié, for 3 trumpets and 3 trombones

=== Organ ===
- Aria (1944)
- Chorals (Premier: 1913), (Deuxième: 1916, rev. 1965), (Troisième: 1920), (Quatrième: 1921, rev. 1951)
- Toccata (1917)
- Fête-Dieu (1918)
- Fuga a 5 voici c kl. terts (1916)
- Sonata 'Da Pacem, Domine' (1913), Previously lost, the manuscript was found in 2021 by American organist Gregory D'Agostino and Dutch historian Jort Fokkens.
- Sonata da chiesa (1927)
- Passacaglia (1929)
- Theme with Variations (1949)
- In dulci jubilo (1961)
- Interlude (1957)
- Interludium (1968)
- Intermezzi: 24 pieces in two books (1935 and 1943–46)
- Intermezzo (1950)
- Meditation on the Hymn "O Lord with Wondrous Mystery" (1960)
- O filii et filiae (1961)
- O sacred head (1962)
- Offertorium (1962)
- Prelude and Fugue in D minor
- Preghiera (1962)
- Quattro studi per organo (1953)
- Sinfonia (1939)
- Suite (1968)
- Veni Creator Spiritus (1961)

=== Piano ===
- Sonata (1934)
- Pavane (1937)
- Passepied (1942)
- Menuet (1944)
- Sérénade (1950)

=== Opera ===
- Philomela (1948–1949), in 3 acts; libretto by Jan Engelman
- De Spiegel uit Venetië (The Mirror from Venice; Der Spiegel von Venedig) (1963–1964), chamber opera in 1 act; libretto by Hélène Nolthenius

=== Oratorio ===
- L'histoire de l'enfant de Dieu, libretto by Pierre Kemp, for soprano, tenor, choir and orchestra (1920)

=== Choir ===
- Sonnet de Pierre Ronsard (1917)
- Missa in honorem Sacratissimi Cordis, with organ (1919)
- Missa in festo assumptionis with organ (1925)
- Missa sponsa Christi with organ (1928)
- Missa Simplex, a cappella (1928)
- De veertien stonden with organ & strings (1928)
- Missa diatonica (1935)
- Magnificat, with organ (1936)
- Missa Christus Rex (1938)
- Te Deum, with organ (1943)
- Laudes vespertinae with organ (1944)
- Missa solemnis, with organ (1946)
- Ommagio a Marenzio (1965)
- Te Deum, with orchestra (1968)

=== Lieder ===
- Magna res est amor, with organ (1919, orchestrated 1919)
- Fiat domine, with organ (1920, orchestrated 1930)
- Miroir de peine (set of five songs on texts by French poet Henri Ghéon, 1875–1944) (1923, orchestrated 1933)
- Trois pastorales (1935)

== Books and other writings ==
- César Franck (1941)
- Over muziek (1950)
- Muziek en muzikaliteit (1952)
