= Martin Lo-A-Njoe =

Dutch composer

- Born: 23 August 1969 (age 56); Paramaribo, Suriname
- Genres: Contemporary classical
- Occupation: Composer
- Website: www.martinloanjoe.nl

Martin Lo-A-Njoe (born 23 August 1969) is a Dutch composer that has been living in the Netherlands since 1972.

== Education ==
Martin Lo-A-Njoe studied at the Sweelinck Conservatory in Amsterdam (nowadays The Amsterdam Conservatory), composition with well-known composer Daan Manneke, and theory and instrumentation with, among others, Theo Verbey and Geert van Keulen. In the same period he studied ethnomusicology at the University of Amsterdam.

== Activities ==
During his study period, Lo-A-Njoe's music was performed in the Beurs van Berlage during a festival, curated by well-known Dutch composer Theo Loevendie, who was affiliated with the Amsterdam Conservatory at the time. Also the Amstel Saxophone Quartet performed his music in the chamber music series at the Amsterdam Stedelijk Museum (Municipal Museum for modern art). After his studies, Lo-A-Njoe worked during a number of years as a pianist for various professional ballet schools, and for the dance company of Krisztina de Châtel. In 2004 he collaborated with writer Trudy van der Wees on a theatre production, for which he wrote the music, and which went on a very successful tour through the Netherlands. Furthermore, for a number of years he worked at the Netherlands Music Institute (NMI) on the ordering and categorisation of the extensive music archives, which cover music composed in the Netherlands from the 19th century onwards. In 2013 the trio 'To Be Sung' performed arrangements by Lo-A-Njoe of songs by the Armenian composer Grikor Mirzaian Suni. Martin Lo-A-Njoe wrote a number of works for the Huygens Fokker Foundation, the Dutch center for microtonal music, which were performed at various festivals in the Muziekgebouw aan 't IJ (the specialized venue for new music in Amsterdam), among which the Gaudeamus Music Week 2010 and the World Minimal Music Festival 2015. In this edition Terry Riley was a special guest. In 2020 an early work by Lo-A-Njoe was performed at a concert with the theme 'Surinaams Klassiek' (Classical composers from Surinam) in the Museum van Loon by violinist Yannick Hiwat and pianist Roderigo Robles de Medina.

== Compositions (Excerpt) ==
=== Works for Percussion ===
- 1996 - ‘’Four Mallets’’, for 4 marimba’s and 1 vibraphone

=== Theatre Music ===
- 2004 - ‘’Musical Dr.Quinn’’, dutch Musical bases on the television series Dr. Quinn, Medicine Woman; vocal score

=== Arrangementen vocaal ===
- 2013 - ‘’Three Armian songs by Grikor Suni’’, for voice, clarinet/ bassclarinet and cello

=== Works for 31-tone Fokker organ ===
- 2010 - ‘’Toccata’’, for 31-toons Fokker-organ and laptop
- 2011 - ’’Pas de deux’’, for 31-tone Fokker-organ and 96-tone Carrillo-piano

=== Chamber music ===
- 1992 - ‘’Mystique’’for violin and piano
- 1998 - ‘’Impressies’’ on three Spanish texts by Rodrigo Barrientos-Aravena
- 2016 - ’’Moving Parts’’for string quartet (2vn, vla, vc)
- 2017 - ’’Swing’’ for Saxophone Quartet (sop, alt, tenor, bariton)
