= Jurriaan Andriessen (composer) =

Dutch composer

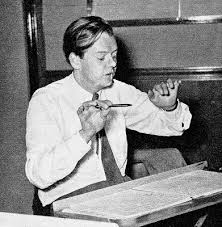
- Jurriaan Andriessen
- Born: Jurriaan Hendrik Andriessen; 15 November 1925; Haarlem
- Died: 23 August 1996 (aged 70); The Hague
- Education: Utrecht Conservatory
- Father: Hendrik Andriessen
- Relatives: Louis Andriessen
- Family: Willem Andriessen (uncle)

Jurriaan Hendrik Andriessen (15 November 1925, Haarlem - 23 August 1996, The Hague) was a Dutch composer. Andriessen studied composition with his father Hendrik at the Utrecht Conservatory before moving to Paris where he studied with Olivier Messiaen.

His brother Louis Andriessen (1939-2021) was also a composer and pianist, as well as his uncle Willem (1887-1964).

== Career ==
The bulk of Andriessen's output is for the stage; his study in Paris was primarily in writing film music. He had a variety of musical influences which he drew upon, including American film music, Aaron Copland's ballets, folk music of various cultures, neoclassicism, and serialism; this eclecticism combined with his compositional skill made his writing well-suited to scoring dramatic works. His first stage composition was incidental music for "The Miraculous Hour", a play premiered at the celebration of the 50th year of Queen Wilhelmina's reign, in 1948. In 1954 the Haagse Comedie (now the Nationaal Toneel, or "National Theatre") appointed him resident composer, where he wrote scores for Eugene O'Neill's Mourning Becomes Electra and Tom Stoppard's Rosencrantz & Guildenstern Are Dead, among numerous others.

His stay in the United States on a Rockefeller Foundation fellowship from 1949 to 1951 was a fruitful one for his orchestral writing, another notable area of his work; during this time he composed the Tanglewood Overture for Serge Koussevitsky, and the Berkshire Symphonies, later used as ballet music by George Balanchine. His compositions were commissioned for state celebrations, including the wedding and the coronation of Queen Beatrix and the silver jubilee of Queen Juliana.

In addition to the theatre works he is most noted for, Andriessen was also a prolific composer of chamber and vocal works, many of which were meant to be performed by amateurs; he has also been a director for television.

=== Selected works ===
- Het wonderlijke uur (The Miraculous Hour), incidental music (1948)
- Berkshire Symphonies, orchestral (1949)
- Rouw past Elektra (Mourning becomes Electra), incidental music (1954)
- Concertino, for bassoon and double woodwind quintet (1962)
- Three dances, for piano solo (1962)
- Entrata Festiva, orchestral, for the wedding of Princess Beatrix (1966)
- Rosencrantz and Guildenstern are Dead, stage score (1968)
- Een Prince van Orangien, orchestral, for the silver jubilee of Queen Juliana (1973)
- Entrata della regina, orchestral, for the coronation of Queen Beatrix (1980)
- Sciarada Spagnuola, Divertimento voor Blaaskwintet (1963)
- Les Cloches des Clochards, suite for carillon (1976)

== Family ==
Andriessen's father, Hendrik, brother Louis, and uncle Willem have also been notable composers
