= One (opera) =

Opera by Michel van der Aa

One is a chamber opera for soprano, video and soundtrack composed in 2002 by Michel van der Aa who also wrote the English-language libretto. It premiered on 12 January 2003 with Barbara Hannigan in the Frascati Theatre, Amsterdam. In 2004 Michel van der Aa received the Matthijs Vermeulen Award for this work.
