= Upload (opera) =

Opera by Michel van der Aa

- Opera by Michel van der Aa
- Librettist: Michel van der Aa
- Language: English
- Premiere: 29 July 2021; Bregenzer Festspiele

Upload is an opera in nine scenes with music and text by Michel van der Aa. The 2021 productions were conducted by Otto Tausk and directed by Michel van der Aa. The opera was commissioned by Dutch National Opera, Cologne Opera, Bregenzer Festspiele, Ensemble Musikfabrik, Park Avenue Armory, and DoubleA Foundation. In October 2021 it was the New York Times critic's pick, and in November 2022 won "Best Digital Opera" at the International Opera Awards ceremony in Madrid.

== Plot ==
The story recounts a daughter whose father has had his memories "uploaded" to the digital cloud, in order to achieve eternal consciousness as a digital being. The opera questions the roles that fate, identity, and the cost of immortality play in our lives. The story is told through two storylines: one through pre-recorded film, and the other by two live opera singers. Live motion-capture projections are also used, allowing for the daughter character to interact with her "digitised" father.

== Roles ==
Live cast (singing roles)

Roles, voice types, premiere casts
Role	Voice type	Premiere cast
Father	baritone	Roderick Williams
Daughter	soprano	Julia Bullock

Film cast (acting roles)

Roles, premiere casts
Role	Premiere cast
Psychiatrist	Katja Herbers
CEO	Ashley Zukerman
Scientist	Esther Mugambi
Brother-in-law	Samuel West
Childhood friend	Claron McFadden
Friend 1	David Eeles
Friend 2	Tessa Stephenson

== Recording ==
A film version of the opera was made available on Medici.tv from July 16, 2021. The Dutch premiere was on October 1, 2021, at the Dutch National Opera in Amsterdam. There were performances at the Park Avenue Armory New York in March 2022 and at the Cologne Opera in April 2022.
