= Bernhard van den Sigtenhorst Meyer =

Dutch composer and teacher (1888–1953)

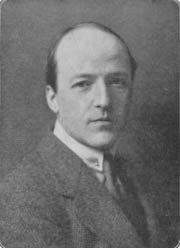
Bernhard van den Sigtenhorst Meyer c. 1923

Bernhard van den Sigtenhorst Meyer (or Sigtenhorst-Meyer; also Bernard) (1888–1953) was a Dutch composer and great connoisseur of the works of Jan Pieterszoon Sweelinck.

He was born in Amsterdam on 17 June 1888, and died in The Hague 17 July 1953.

He studied music theory with Daniël de Lange, piano with Jean Baptiste Charles de Pauw and composition with Bernard Zweers.

In 1935, he was co-founder of the Association for Protestant church music (Vereniging voor Protestantse Kerkmuziek).

Notable students of Sigtenhorst-Meyer's included Hans Henkemans.
