= Margriet Ehlen =

Dutch poet and musician (born 1943)

- Born: September 28, 1943 (age 82); Heerlen, Limburg, Netherlands
- Education: Maastricht Academy of Music (BM in Music Education)
- Occupations: conductor and educator of classical music

Margriet Ehlen (born 28 September 1943) is a Dutch poet, composer, conductor and educator of classical music.

== Life and career ==
Ehlen was born in Heerlen and has composed for a large variety of instruments, yet is particularly active in composition for voice. These works extend from solo vocalists to choir music. Many of her compositions for voice set poetry to music. To this end she has utilized texts by Gerrit Achterberg, Anna Bijns, Emily Dickinson, Wiel Kusters and Elly de Waard. She is also an accomplished and decorated poet herself.

She studied composition with Gerard Kockelmans, Willem de Vries Robbé and Robert Heppener, piano with Bart Berman and Kees Steinroth and choir conducting with Jan Eelkema. She graduated with a degree in music education from the Maastricht Academy of Music, and taught at teacher colleges in Rotterdam, Maastricht and Sittard.

She has collected and analyzed the works of her former teacher, the Dutch composer Gerard Kockelmans, and written about the composer Jean Lambrechts.

Many of her works were published by Donemus, a not-for-profit Dutch publishing house that promotes contemporary classical composers. Some others were published by the Rieks Sodenkamp publishing house in Maastricht.

== Selected works ==
- 1979 Cyclus I, five songs for voice and piano on poems Martin Boot
- 1980 Three songs for voice and piano on texts by Martin Boot
- 1984 Palimpseste, for songs on poems by Wiel Kusters for mezzo-soprano and piano
- 1988 And send the Rose to you, ten songs for choir on texts by Emily Dickinson and Elly de Waard
- 1988 Wijfken, staat oppe for soprano and flute/alt-flute on a text by Anna Bijnstriptiek
- 1990 Euridyce, a cycle of seven songs for mezzo-soprano and flute quartet on texts by Gerrit Achterberg
- 1990 Three small songs for flute and medium voice on poems by Hadewych Laugs
- 1994 Dröm for soprano and flute on a text by Birgitta Buch
- 1995 Prèsque Berceuse for soprano, flute and harpsichord or piano on a text by H. Leopold
- 1995 Too few the mornings be, for soprano, saxophone, horn and piano
- 2003 For the Distant, mini opera for soprano, 2 percussion orchestras, 2 dancers, video, and 2 choirs
- 2006 Ignis Caritas for carillon on a text by Margriet Ehlen
- 2012 The Iron Lady of Maastricht on a text by Daan Doesborgh, counter tenor and saxophone

== Awards ==
- 1997 Peter Kempkens Literature Award
- 1995-1999 Veldeke awards (4 prizes)
