= Michel van der Aa =

Dutch composer

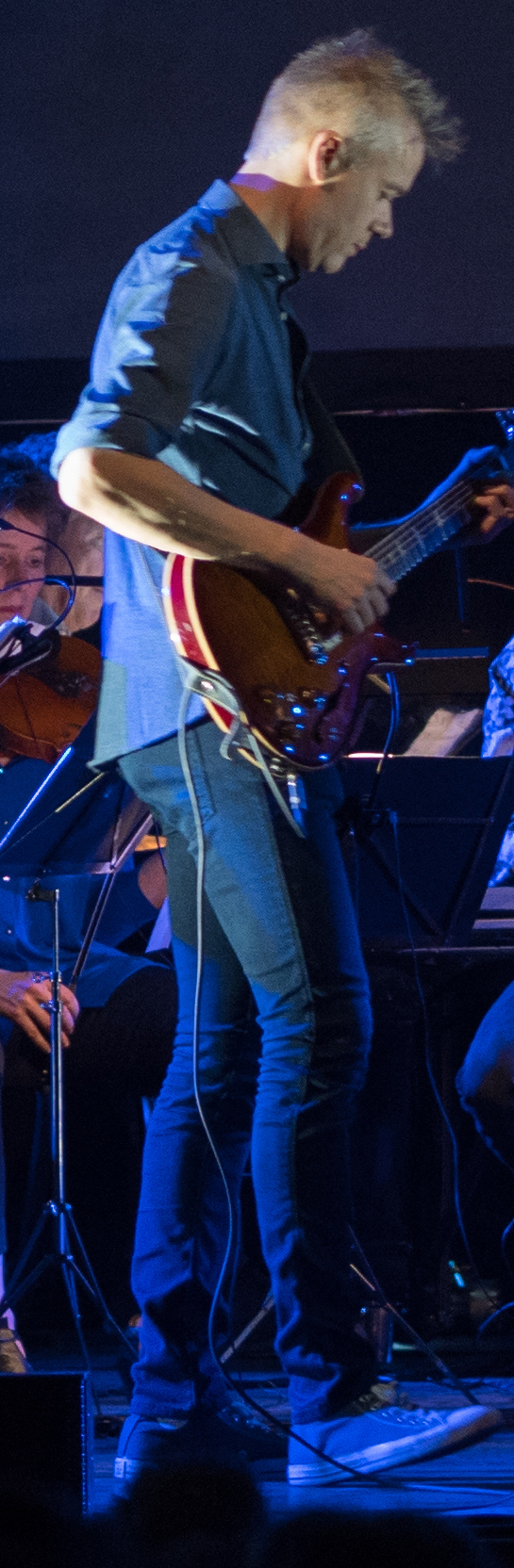
Michel van der Aa, 2018

Michel van der Aa (Dutch pronunciation: [miˈɕɛl vɑn dər ˈaː]; born 10 March 1970) is a Dutch composer of contemporary classical music.

== Early years ==
Michel van der Aa was born 10 March 1970 in Oss. He trained as a recording engineer at the Royal Conservatory of The Hague, and studied composition with Diderik Wagenaar, Gilius van Bergeijk, and Louis Andriessen.

== Career ==
The music of van der Aa has been performed by ensembles and orchestras internationally. Those include the Asko|Schönberg ensemble, Freiburger Barockorchester, Ensemble Modern, Royal Concertgebouw Orchestra, Melbourne Symphony Orchestra, Dutch National Opera, Mozarteum Orchestra Salzburg, Seattle Chamber Players, Ensemble Nomad Tokyo, musikFabrik, Continuum Ensemble Toronto, Southwest German Radio Symphony Orchestra, Netherlands Radio Orchestras, Norrköping Symphony Orchestra, Sweden, and the Helsinki Avanti! Chamber Orchestra.

He completed a short program in film directing at the New York Film Academy in 2002. He also participated in the Lincoln Center Theater Director's Lab, a short, intensive course in stage direction in 2007.

Michel van der Aa's music theatre works, including the chamber opera One (2002), the opera After Life (2006, Amsterdam) and the music theatre work The Book of Disquiet, have received international critical praise. The innovative aspect of these operas is their use of film images and sampled soundtracks as an essential element of the score.

He directed the television production of One for the Dutch national broadcasting company NPS. Passage (2004), a short film by van der Aa, has been shown at several international festivals and has been aired on Dutch national television.

He has been a featured artist at the Perth Tura New Music Festival and Holland Festival. He has collaborated with choreographers such as Kazuko Hirabayashi, Philippe Blanchard, Ben Wright and Annabelle Lopez Ochoa.

== Awards ==
Van der Aa was the recipient of the Gaudeamus International Composers Award in 1999. He also received the prestigious Matthijs Vermeulen Award for One in 2004. He received the Ernst von Siemens Composer Prize in 2005. He also received the Charlotte Köhler Prize for his directing work and the interdisciplinary character of his oeuvre in the same year. He was awarded the Hindemith Prize of the Schleswig-Holstein Musik Festival in 2006.

In November 2012 it was announced that van der Aa would be the recipient of the 2013 University of Louisville Grawemeyer Award in Music Composition, for his cello concerto Up-Close, a 'highly innovative fusion of musical and visual art' written for Sol Gabetta and the Amsterdam Sinfonietta. In 2013 he won the Mauricio Kagel Music Prize.

== Projects ==
Van der Aa's 3D film-opera Sunken Garden, a collaboration with David Mitchell, author of Cloud Atlas, was a joint commission from English National Opera, Barbican Centre, Toronto Luminato Festival, Opéra National de Lyon, and the Holland Festival. It was given its première by English National Opera conducted by André de Ridder at the Barbican Centre, London, on 12 April 2013, with Roderick Williams in the role of Toby.

His music is recorded on the Harmonia Mundi, Col Legno, Composers' Voice, BVHaast, and VPRO Eigenwijs labels, as well as his own label Disquiet Media.

== Works ==
=== Opera and music theatre ===
- Vuur (2001), opera, for solo voice, actors, singers, ensemble and soundtrack
- One (2002), chamber opera, for soprano, soundtrack and film
  - libretto by the composer
- After Life (2005–06), opera, for six solo voices, ensemble, soundtrack, and film
  - libretto by the composer, after Hirokazu Kore-Eda
- The Book of Disquiet (2008), music theatre, for actor, ensemble, soundtrack and film
  - libretto after Fernando Pessoa, adapted by the composer
- Sunken Garden (2011–12), opera, for three singers, ensemble, soundtrack, and film
  - libretto by David Mitchell
- Blank Out (2015–16), chamber opera, for soprano, baritone (film), choir (film) and 3D film
- Eight (2018–19), virtual reality installation, for mezzo-soprano, soprano, choir, soundtrack, VR
- Upload (2021, Bregenzer Festspiele), music and libretto by van der Aa, for soprano, baritone, small orchestra, film projection, motion capture
- The Book of Water (2021–22), chamber music theatre, for two actors, soprano, string quartet, film and soundtrack
  - based on the 1979 novel Man in the Holocene by Max Frisch, adapted by the composer and Madelon Kooijman

=== Orchestra ===
- See-Through (2000), for orchestra
- Here [to be found] (2001), for soprano, chamber orchestra, and soundtrack
- Here [enclosed] (2003), for chamber orchestra and soundtrack
- Second Self (2004), for orchestra and soundtrack
- Imprint (2005), for Baroque orchestra
- Spaces of Blank (2007), song cycle for mezzo-soprano, orchestra and soundtrack
- Violin Concerto (2014) for violin and orchestra

=== Ensemble ===
- Span (1996), for ensemble and soundtrack
- Between (1997), for percussion quartet and soundtrack
- Above (1999), for ensemble and soundtrack
- Attach (1999–2000), for ensemble and soundtrack
- Here [in circles] (2002), for soprano (with small cassette player) and ensemble
- Mask (2006), for ensemble and soundtrack
- Up-Close (2010), concerto for solo cello, strings ensemble/orchestra, soundtrack and film

=== Chamber music ===
- Auburn (1994), for guitar (classical or electric) and soundtrack
- Oog (1995), for cello and soundtrack
- Double (1997), for violin and piano
- Quadrivial (1997), for flute, violin, cello, and prepared piano
- Solo (1997), for percussion solo
- Wake (1997), for percussion duo
- Caprce (1999), for violin solo
- Just Before (1999), for piano and soundtrack
- Memo (2003), for violin and portable cassette recorder
- Transit (2009), for piano and film
- Rekindle (2009), for flute and soundtrack
- And how are we today? (2012), for mezzo-soprano, piano, and double bass
- Miles Away (2012), for mezzo-soprano, violin, piano and double bass

=== Dance and film ===
- now [in fragments] (1995), for soprano, clarinet, cello and soundtrack
  - ballet, commissioned by the Richard Alston Dance Company in collaboration with Ben Wright
- Staring at the Space (1995–96), for chamber orchestra
  - 70 minute theatre/dance work, commissioned by the Norrköping Symphony Orchestra and the Östgöta Dance Company
- Faust (1998), for ensemble and soundtrack
  - a large-scale (90 minute) dance work, commissioned by the New National Theatre Tokyo, choreographed by Kazuko Hirabayashi
- The New Math(s) (2000), for soprano, traverso, marimba, violin and soundtrack
  - Co-commissioned score with Louis Andriessen for a short film directed by Hal Hartley, for the BBC and NPS
- Solitaire (2003), for violin and soundtrack
  - ballet, commissioned by the Het Nationaal Ballet, Den Bosch

=== Other ===
- Writing to Vermeer (1999), opera by Louis Andriessen and Peter Greenaway, with the thirteen electronic music inserts (which accompany a corresponding film projection) composed by van der Aa.
- The Book of Sand (2015), digital interactive song cycle, based on Jorge Luis Borges' short story "The Book of Sand", with Kate Miller-Heidke
- Time Falling (2020), album in collaboration with Kate Miller-Heidke
