= Quink Vocal Ensemble =

Dutch vocal ensemble

Quink is a Dutch vocal ensemble founded in 1978.

The five singer line-up c. 1996 included Machteld Van Woerden (soprano), Kees-Jan De Koning (bass), Harry Van Berne (tenor), Corrie Pronk (alto), Marjolein Koetsier (soprano). The four singer line up in 2012 was Marjon Strijk (soprano), Elsbeth Gerritsen (mezzo-soprano), with Harry van Berne and Kees Jan de Koning continuing as tenor and bass.

== Selected discography ==
- Pastime with Good Company, CBS
- Benjamin Britten 1984
- Byrd, Etcetera
- Italian Renaissance Madrigals, Telarc
- Vaughan Williams, Finzi 1987, re-released Challenge 2012
- Carols Around the World. Telarc 80202, 1989
- Folksongs of the World. Telarc 1991.
- English Madrigals. Telarc 1993
- Purcell Odes Telarc
- Ain't misbehavin' Ottavo OTR C19862
- Robert Heppener, Daan Manneke, Ton de Leeuw, Huub Kerstens: Invisible Cities - modern compositions by Dutch composers. Telarc 1996
- Rossini Petit messe solennelle - Challenge
- A un niño llorando (Christmas with Quink Vocal Ensemble) - Challenge Classics
- Juan Vásquez: Gentil Señora Mia, 16th Century Songs and Villancicos. Brilliant Classics, 2013
