= Kockelman =

Kockelman is a surname. Notable people with the surname include:

- Kara Kockelman (born 1969), American civil and transportation engineer
- Paul Kockelman, America anthropologist

== See also ==
- Kockelmans
