= Juan Vásquez (composer) =

Spanish priest and composer

Juan Vásquez (or Vázquez, c. 1500 in Badajoz – c. 1560 in Seville) was a Spanish priest and composer of the Renaissance. He can be considered part of the School of Andalusia group of composers along with Francisco Guerrero, Cristóbal de Morales, Juan Navarro Hispalensis and others.

== Biography ==
Even relative to the standards of early music composers, the life of Juan Vásquez is largely unknown, despite the best efforts of leading musicologists. As a result, all mentions of his age are educated guesses by professionals rather than hard facts. A chapel singer from boyhood, his engagement in 1511 as a "contralto" at the cathedral of Plasencia, Cáceres indicates that he was still a boy at that time. He does not appear in any other records for nearly 20 years. In late 1530 he turns up at Badajoz Cathedral, teaching plainchant to the choirboys. The year 1539 finds him singing in Palencia Cathedral, where he became known as a composer. He then seems to have gone to Madrid in 1541, but by 1545 he was back in his native city of Badajoz as the cathedral's chapel master (Maestro de capilla). From 1551, he was on the payroll of Seville's Don Antonio de Zuñiga, to whom Vásquez dedicated his collection that year of Villancicos I canciones. It's thought that Vásquez remained in Seville until his death. In 1560 all his secular compositions were published in Recopilatión de sonetos y villancicos.

== Music ==
His sole surviving work of sacred music is the Agenda defunctorum (Office of the Dead) of 1556. In this work primarily for four voices (some sections included three voices and others five) Vásquez not only demonstrated his ability with extended forms of music but also conveyed his facility for counterpoint and his beautiful and melodious lines. Cantus firmi are apparent in this work but he used them intermittently in all of the voices at various places. The music employs both plainchant and polyphony, with his best and most extensive use of polyphony to be found in the Missa pro defunctis from that collection. The Office of the Dead is very highly regarded for its contemplative qualities, standing well alongside Vásquez's elegantly simple songs which have more reputation today.

The bulk of Vásquez's compositions are ingeniously written secular villancicos (approximately 90 in total), employing texts by leading Spanish poets of the day. Most of the music is formally typical but qualitative aspects of his music included easy counterpoint, textual emphasis with care given to the music for this purpose and delightful variations. Many of them also include folk poetry and allude to Spanish folk song styles, and they seem to have been quite popular during the composer's lifetime.

== Agenda defunctorum ==
Vásquez's setting (published in 1556) is remarkable for being part of a complete Agenda defunctorum that included Matins and Lauds in addition to the more usual Vespers and Mass. In the first publication, the original Sevillan chants appear alongside their polyphonic elaborations. It was in Spain and Portugal that the tradition of stile antico requiem settings had the greatest longevity, its ramifications extending well into the next century (as with Tomás Luis de Victoria's setting), and, through the colonial possessions of both countries, into new continents as well. The service seems to follow the example of Morales closely, and indeed both were written for Seville.

Vásquez composed his imposing Agenda defunctorum in 1556 in Sevilla. For the text Vásquez has chosen parts out of the Officium Defunctorum of the Seville Cathedral. Versions of most of these chants can be found in the modern Liber Usualis. This work by Vásquez consists of six parts: Inventorium (Invitatory), In Primo Nocturno (first night), In secundo Noctruno (second night), In tertio Nocturno (third night), Ad Laudes (laude), and Missa pro defunctis. The musical items not set polyphonically by Vásquez would have been performed using their original plainchant, possibly with improvised polyphony. The items which Vásquez set whose corresponding chants can be found in the Liber Usualis are the Invitatory, Psalm no.5, nine antiphons, five lessons, one Responsorium, the Canticum Zachariae, the Requiescant in pace, Amen and the Missa pro defunctis.

Vásquez has written this Agenda defunctorum for four voices (SATB). In most of the pieces from the Agenda defunctorum, Vásquez uses the homophonic and polyphonic style alternately. The Canticum Zachariae is optimised for alternating between these, in which the strophe with even numbers will be performed by several voices (SATB), and the strophe with odd numbers by one voice. The Responsorium Libera me, Domine is similarly written for alternating plainsong and polyphony. The Graduale is set for three voices (ATB).

== Discography ==
=== Dedicated discs ===
- Agenda Defunctorum: Capilla Peñaflorida, Josep Cabré. Isabel Álvarez (soprano), Karmele Iriarte (soprano), M. Jesús Ugalde (soprano), David Azurza (alto), Mirari Pérez (alto), David Sagastume (alto), Jon Bagüés (tenor), Josep Benet (tenor), Peio Ormazábal (tenor), Nicolás Basarrate (bass), Aitor Sáiz de Cortázar (bass), Gonzalo Ubani (bass), Fernando Sánchez (dulcian), Loreto Fernández Imaz (organ). CD, 73:22, Almaviva 0122, ASIN: B000025Q3B, UPC: 8427287101220, recorded June 1996 (Seville).
- Ex Agenda Defunctorum Officium: Coro de Cámara de la Universidad de Salamanca, Bernardo García-Bernalt. Gloria Ramos Sánez de Tejada, Amparo Cerdá Miralles, Araceli Rodríguez Flores, Paz Carrasco García, Paz Vara Castro, Miriam Gutíerrez Martínez, Inmaculada Vara Castro, Raquel Nieto Arroyo, Mercedes Pinto Oviedo, Bernardo García-Bernalt Alonso (director), etc. CD, 49:50, Radio Nacional de España 640036, recorded January 1991.
- Villancicos - Quink Vocal Ensemble 2013
- Si no os hubiera mirado: Los Afectos Diversos, Nacho Rodríguez. Selection from his "Recopilación de sonetos y villancicos a quatro y a cinco", Sevilla, 1560. Cristina Teijeiro (soprano), Flavio Ferri-Benedetti, Gabriel Díaz (altus), Diego Blázquez, Fran Braojos, Nacho Rodríguez (tenors), Manuel Jiménez (baritone), Bart Vandewege (bass), Laura Puerto (organ and harp), Manuel Minguillón (vihuela), Thor Jorgen (gamba). CD, 53:42, iTinerant Early IE003, UPC: 7502258853726, recorded January 2016 (Segovia)

=== Various artists ===
- Canciones y Ensaladas - Chansons et pièces instrumentales du Siècle d'Or: Ensemble Clément Janequin, Dominique Visse. Visse (countertenor), Bruno Boterf (tenor), Vincent Bouchot (baritone), François Fauché (bass), Renaud Delaigue (bass), Éric Bellocq (lute, guitar), Massimo Moscardo (lute), Matthieu Lusson (viol), Jean-Marc Aymes (positive organ). CD, 58:00, Harmonia Mundi HMC 90 1627, recorded January 1997.
- The Victory of Santiago - Voices of Renaissance Spain: The Concord Ensemble. Paul Flight (countertenor), Pablo Corá (tenor), N. Lincoln Hanks (tenor), Daniel Carberg (tenor), Sumner Thompson (baritone), Daniel Cole (bass), Bruce Remaker (countertenor). CD, 63:00, Dorian 90274, recorded February 1999 (Troy, NY).
