= Caroline Ansink =

Dutch musician (born 1959)

Caroline Ansink (born 8 August 1959 in Amsterdam) is a Dutch musician, music educator and composer.

== Biography ==
Ansink studied music at Utrechts Conservatorium, flute with Abbie de Quant and composition with Joep Straesser. After completing her studies with Docerend Musicus (1985) and Uitvoerend Musicus (1986) degrees, Ansink worked as a flutist with the Clara Schumann Orchestra in Cologne and a music teacher at the Utrechts Conservatorium.

In 1992 Ansink and composer Catharina van Rennes were subjects of a television documentary I compose as a human being by NOS TV.

== Awards and honors ==
- 1989 Composition Prize
- 1985 second prize of DEDOK Mannheim
- 1989 the first prize GEDOK for Pyrrhus for organ (1988), for which she *1988 Cappella Civica award in Trieste
- 1989 third prize of the Association of Hungarian Musicians
- 1990 encouragement prize from the Amsterdams Fonds voor de Kunst
- 1990 honorable mention The Washington International Competition
- 1992 Prize from the city of Chard, Great Britain

== Works ==
Ansink composes chamber music, orchestral and choir works. Selected works include:

- Shades of Silence for string quartet (1984)
- Pyrrhus for organ (1988)
- SkopÛs piano trio (1989)
- Night and Day (1990)
- Zeitenschrunde (1990)
- Brezze for string quartet (1990)
- Capriccio for Solo Violin
- Over the Moon
- Epitaph für Mariusfor flute and piano (2008)
