= Daniel Ruyneman =

Dutch composer and conductor (1886–1963)

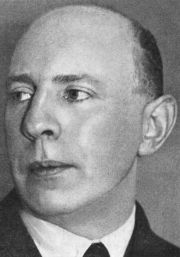
Daniël Ruyneman

Daniël Ruyneman (8 August 1886 – 25 July 1963) was a Dutch composer and pianist, and inventor of the Electrophone.

== Career ==
Ruyneman was born in Amsterdam and travelled to India in his early years. He took piano lessons as a child but, intended for a career in marine service, he did not take a serious interest in music until the age of 18. From 1913 to 1916 he studied composition at the Amsterdam Conservatory with Bernard Zweers.

In 1918 Ruyneman helped found the Society of Modern Dutch Composers (Nederlansche Vereeniging voor Mod-erne Scheppende Toonkunst), which in 1922 became the Dutch branch of the International Society for Contemporary Music. He was also president of the Netherlands Society for Contemporary Music from 1930 until 1962.

In the 1920s he worked in Groningen, where he became associated with the expressionistic De Ploeg group of artists. Ruyneman made a special study of Javanese instruments. Before the war he established and edited Maandblad voor Hedendaagsche Muziek (Contemporary Music Monthly Magazine), which was banned during the German occupation of the Netherlands. He published a book about the Dutch composer Jan Ingenhoven in 1938.

Ruyneman became director of the Stedelijk Museum Concerts in Amsterdam in 1950, a position he held until his death.

== Music ==
He was initially influenced by Grieg, Debussy and Ravel, followed neoclassical trends (in pieces such as the Partita for Strings, 1943 and the Nightingale Quintet, 1949), produced some large scale romantic works (such as the Violin Concerto), and towards the end of his life experimented with serialism in the four Réflexions (1959-1961).

Another set of works explores the use vocal polyphony as "colour", as in De roep, ("The Call", 1918) for chamber choir a cappella which uses various vowels and consonants but no words, followed up in 1931 with the Sonata for Chamber Choir.

Ruyneman's opera De Gebroeders Karamazov, follows Dostoyevsky. He also orchestrated fragments of Mussorgsky’s unfinished opera The Marriage in 1930, supplementing the missing parts with his own music.

== The Electrophone ==
His interest in Javanese music led to the invention of the Electrophone, an instrument consisting of various electric bells, playable from a keyboard. The unique cup-bells used for this were (according to some), specially cast by the bell foundry of John Taylor & Co of Loughborough, England, though others say they were found by the composer in a London junk shop. The instrument was used in his 1918 chamber work Hiëroglyphs and later in the Symphonie Brève of 1927. However, the Electrophone was destroyed during World War II in an air raid on Rotterdam, so subsequent performances have substituted vibraphones.

== Works ==
Dramatic

- De Clown, incidental music for a “psycho-symbolic” play (1915)
- De Gebroeders Karamazov (1928)
- Le Manage, opera (1930)

Orchestral

- Symphony No 1, Symphonie brève (1927)
- Musica per orchestra per una festa Olandese (1936)
- Concerto for Orchestra (1937)
- Piano Concerto (1939)
- Violin Concerto (1940), fp Amsterdam, 23 February 1943
- Amphitryon, overture (1943)
- Partita for Strings (1943)
- Symphony No 2 (1953), fp Utrecht, 14 March 1956
- Gilgamesj, Babylonian epos (1962)

Chamber

- Violin Sonata No 1
- Violin Sonata No 2 (1914)
- Klaaglied van een Slaaf for violin and piano (1917)
- Hiëroglyphs for 3 flutes, celesta, harp, cup-bells, piano, 2 mandolins, and 2 guitars (1918)
- Divertimento for flute, clarinet, horn, violin, and piano (1927)
- Clarinet Sonata (1936)
- Four tempi for 4 Cellos (1937)
- Sonatina in modo antiquo for cello and piano (1939)
- Sonata da camera for flute and piano (1942)
- String Quartet (1946)
- Nightingale Quintet, wind instruments (1949)
- Four chansons Bengalies for flute and piano (1950)
- Sonatina for flute and piano or harpsichord (1951)
- Oboe Sonatina (1952)
- Amatarasu (Ode to the Sun Goddess), on a Japanese melody chamber ensemble (1953)
- Violin Sonata No 2 (1956)
- Reflexions II for flute, viola and guitar (1959),
- Three Fantasies for cello and piano (1960)
- Reflexions III for flute, violin, viola, cello and piano (1960–61)
- Reflexions IV for wind quintet (1961)

Piano

- Three Pathematologieën (1915)
- Piano Sonatina No 1 (1917)
- Piano Sonata (1931)
- Kleine Sonata (1938)
- Sonatines mélodiques pour l’enseignement moderne du piano (1947)
- Piano Sonatina No 2 (1954)

Vocal

- Chineesche liederen (1917)
- Sows le pont Mirabeau for women’s chorus, flute, harp, and string quartet (1917)
- De Roep, chorus using wordless vowel sounds (1918)
- Sonata, on wordless vowel sounds, for chamber chorus (1931)
- Four Liederen for tenor and small orchestra (1937)
- Die Weise von Liebe und Tod des Kornets Christoph Rilke for narrator and piano (1946)
- Ancient Greek Songs for baritone or bass, flute, oboe, cello and harp (1954)
- Five Melodies for voice and piano (1957)
- Cchansons de Maquisards condamnes for alto or baritone and orchestra (1957)
- Reflexions I for soprano, flute, guitar, viola, vibraphone, xylophone and percussion (1958–59)
