= Gerrit Achterberg =

Dutch poet

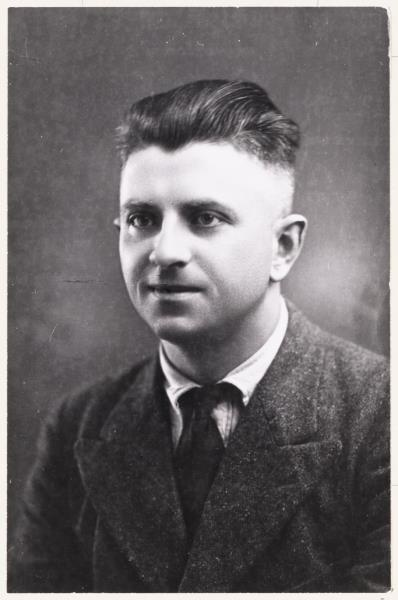
Gerrit Achterberg (1936)

Gerrit Achterberg (20 May 1905 – 17 January 1962) was a Dutch poet. His early poetry concerned a desire to be united with a beloved in death.

Achterberg was born in Nederlangbroek in the Netherlands as the third son of a family of eight children. He was raised as a Protestant within the Calvinist tradition. His father was a coachman until the automobile gained popularity. Achterberg was a very good student, and in 1924 he embarked on a career as a teacher. In the same year, he made his literary debut together with Arie Dekkers, who had encouraged him to write, together publishing De Zangen van Twee Twintigers (English: The Songs of Two Twenty-Somethings).

Meanwhile, Achterberg became more withdrawn and introverted. After he was turned down by the military due to "sickness of the soul", he threatened to kill himself.

Achterberg's literary career began to take off when Roel Houwink presented himself as his mentor. Achterberg published his collection "Afvaart" in 1931, in which his famous theme, of a love irrevocably lost, was already strongly present. After the publication of "Afvaart", Achterberg suffered a mental breakdown and was committed to a psychiatric institution several times. His mental instability caused occasional violent outbursts.

These eruptions of violence escalated in 1937. At that time, Achterberg was living in Utrecht and was again engaged to be married. On 15 December 1937 he tried to force himself on Bep van Es, the 16-year-old daughter of his landlady. When the latter tried to stop him, he shot and killed her, and wounded her daughter. After the shooting, he turned himself in and was sentenced to involuntary commitment. He was committed until 1943. During this commitment and the period following (between 1939 and 1953), he published 22 collections of poetry.

In 1946 he married his childhood friend Cathrien van Baak, with whom he lived in Leusden until he died from a heart attack in 1962.

In 1959, Achterberg received the Constantijn Huygens Prize for his entire body of work. His most famous work is the Ballad Reiziger doet Golgotha (A Tourist Does Golgotha) and the sonnet sequence Ballade van de gasfitter (1953;Ballad of the gasfitter). J.M. Coetzee included this sonnet sequence in an anthology of his English translations of Dutch poetry entitled Landscape with Rowers (2004). Earlier in his career, Coetzee also wrote an essay on this sonnet sequence, titled: 'Achterberg's "Ballade van de gasfitter": The Mystery of I and You' (1977),

== See also ==
- Margriet Ehlen - Dutch composer who has set some of Achterberg's poetry to music
