= Noske =

Noske is a German surname. Notable people with the surname include:

- Anja Noske (born 1986), German rower
- Barbara Noske, Dutch cultural anthropologist and philosopher
- Bernd Noske (1946-2014), German musician
- Gustav Noske (1868–1946), German Minister of Defence
- Mark Noske (born 1975), Australian racecar driver
- Klaus Nöske (1911–1978), German fighter pilot during World War II

== See also ==
- Gustav Adolf Nosske (1902–1990), German SS officer and Holocaust perpetrator
