= Richard Rijnvos =

Dutch composer

Richard Rijnvos (born 16 December 1964, in Tilburg) is a Dutch composer.

== Education and influences ==
Rijnvos studied composition at the Royal Conservatory of The Hague with Jan van Vlijmen and Brian Ferneyhough. He received a DAAD scholarship and attended a postgraduate course at the Musikhochschule in Freiburg. In 1994 he took part in the International Course for Professional Choreographers and Composers at Bretton Hall (Wakefield, UK).

Contacts with Morton Feldman and John Cage between 1986 and 1992 were a major influence on his development. Rijnvos has also been influenced by the works of artists outside of music such as William S. Burroughs, Samuel Beckett, Joseph Beuys and Italo Calvino.

== Compositions ==
Rijnvos has written for solo instrumentalists, small ensembles, symphony and chamber orchestra.

He has written several cycles, such as Block Beuys (1995–2000), based on the collection of works by Joseph Beuys in the Hessisches Landesmuseum, Darmstadt, and the prize-winning three-part NYConcerto (2004–2006).

Commissioned by the Netherlands Radio 4, he wrote Riflesso sull'acqua for cor anglais and orchestra, premiered in 2008.

Richard Rijnvos has received commissions from the Royal Concertgebouw Orchestra and Ensemble Intercontemporain.

In 2008, he was a featured composer at November Music, Holland's annual contemporary music festival.

== Awards ==
In 2000 Rijnvos was awarded the Matthijs Vermeulen Award for Times Square Dance.

In August 2008 he was awarded the Buma Toonzetters Prize for NYConcerto.

== Other activities ==
Between October 2009 and 2016 Rijnvos was Head of Composition in the Department of Music at the University of Durham; in 2014, he was appointed Chair of Composition at the same institution, and continues to serve in that role. He is also chairman of the Union of Composers in the Netherlands, and artistic advisor of the Ives Ensemble, of which he was managing director between 1991 and 2000.

== Note ==
The article incorporates material translated from the Dutch Wikipedia as of December 2009.

== See also ==
- Asko Ensemble
