= Klas Torstensson =

Swedish-Dutch composer (born 1951)

Klas Torstensson (born 16 January 1951) is a Swedish-Dutch composer.

== Career ==
Torstensson was born in Nässjö, and studied composition Ingesunds Musikhögskola, musicology at University of Gothenburg and electronic music at the Institute for Sonology.

Torstensson’s compositions are performed by orchestras, ensembles and soloists worldwide and presented on most major European new music festivals: Huddersfield, Ultima (Oslo), Steirischer Herbst (Graz), Wien Modern, Stockholm New Music, Nordic Music Days (Reykjavik/Malmö/Berlin), Gaudeamus (Amsterdam), Warsaw, Gaida (Vilnius), Festival van Vlaanderen (Belgium), Holland Festival (Amsterdam), GAS (Gothenburg), NYYD (Tallinn) and Darmstadt.

He was also featured composer at festivals such as Stockholm New Music 1999 (together with Mauricio Kagel and György Kurtág), Time of Music 2001, (Viitasaari, Finland), Montréal-Nouvelles-Musiques 2003 and Sacrum Profanum 2009 (Kraków).

During Spring 2009 Klas Torstensson was "composer-in-focus" with the Swedish Radio Symphony Orchestra.

City Imprints, a new composition for large symphony orchestra, was commissioned from Torstensson by the Gothenburg Symphony Orchestra in 2021 to celebrate the city's 400th anniversary. The premiere, along with the celebrations, was postponed because of the COVID-19 pandemic.

== Selected discography ==
- The Expedition – Netherlands Radio Philharmonic; Péter Eötvös, conductor; Charlotte Riedijk, soprano; Göran Eliasson, tenor; Olle Persson and Mats Persson, baritone
- Self-portrait with percussion, Diptych Intermezzo & Epilogue – Asko Ensemble; Peppie Wiersma, percussion; Hans Leenders, conductor; Royal Stockholm Philharmonic Orchestra; Charlotte Riedijk, soprano; Alan Gilbert, conductor
- In grosser Sehnsucht, song cycle – Charlotte Riedijk, soprano; Osiris Trio (Ellen Corver, piano; Peter Brunt, violin; Larissa Groeneveld, cello)
- Stick on Stick, Urban Solo, Urban Songs – Charlotte Riedijk, soprano & synthesizer; Netherlands Radio Symphony Orchestra; ASKO Ensemble, Zoltán Peskó and Stephan Asbury, conductors
- Licks & Brains I & II, Solo for bass saxophone – Leo van Oostrom, bass saxophone; Netherlands Saxophone Quartet (Leo van Oostrom, Ed Bogaard, Adri van Velsen and Alex de Leeuw); Klas Torstensson and David Porcelijn, conductors
- The last diary – Palle Fuhr Jørgensen, narrator; ASKO Ensemble & Schönberg Ensemble; Reinbert de Leeuw, conductor
- Koorde – Pianoduo Cees van Zeeland and Gerard Bouwhuis
- Järn – Orkest De Volharding 1972-1992 Trajecten; Cees van Zeeland, conductor
- Redskap – Malmö Percussion Ensemble; Klas Torstensson, conductor
- Spåra – Hoketus; Klas Torstensson, conductor

== Awards ==
- 1991 Matthijs Vermeulen Award
- 1999 Stora Christ Johnson-priset
- 2009 Swedish Association of Music Publishers – "Årets konstmusikpris - större ensemble/opera", for the orchestral work Polarhavet
