= Hans Henkemans =

Dutch musician and psychiatrist

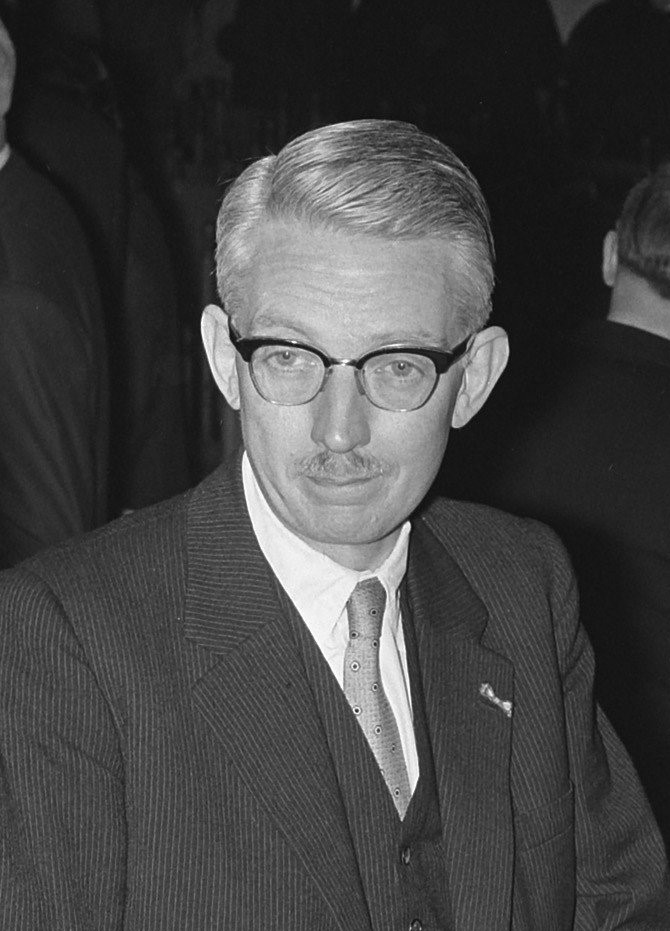
Henkemans (1964)

Hans Henkemans (The Hague, 23 December 1913 – Nieuwegein, 29 December 1995) was a Dutch pianist, teacher, composer of classical music and psychiatrist.

Henkemans was one of the most important Dutch composers of his time. From 1926 to 1931 he studied piano and composition with Bernhard van den Sigtenhorst Meyer, and from 1933 to 1938 with Willem Pijper. Later he studied piano with George van Renesse. Henkemans was influenced by Claude Debussy, Maurice Ravel and Willem Pijper.

== Psychiatry ==
From 1931, Henkemans studied medicine at the University of Utrecht. In 1981 Henkemans analyzed the creative process in the textbook Sublimatie-stoornissen bij kunstenaars [Sublimation disorders in artists] (Deventer, 1981).

== List of compositions ==
Stage

- Winter Cruise, Opera in 3 acts (1977); libretto by the composer after W. Somerset Maugham

Orchestra

- Voorspel (Prelude) for orchestra (1936)
- Primavera for small orchestra (1944, published 1950, for larger orchestra 1959)
- Partita for orchestra (1960)
- Barcarola fantastica for orchestra (1962)
- Dona montana, three pieces for orchestra (1964)
- Riflessioni, 3 pieces for small string orchestra (1985–1986, revised 1987)

Concertante

- Concerto No.1 for piano and string orchestra (1932)
- Passacaglia and Gigue (Piano Concerto No.2) for piano and orchestra (1941–1942)
- Concerto for flute and orchestra (1945–1946)
- Concerto for violin and orchestra (1948–1950; published 1950)
- Concerto for viola and orchestra (1950; published 1954)
- Concerto for harp and orchestra (1955)
- Élégies – in memoriam Pierre Monteux for four flutes and orchestra (1967)
- Concerto for horn and orchestra (1981)
- Concerto for cello and orchestra (1988–1989)
- Concerto No.3 for piano and orchestra (1992)

Chamber music

- Quintet for harp and string quartet (1931)
- Quintet No.1 for winds (1934)
- Sonata for cello and piano (1936)
- Primavera for flute, oboe (or oboe d'amore), clarinet, horn, 3 violins, 2 violas, cello and double bass (1944); orchestrated in 1959
- Sonata for violin and piano (1944)
- Hommage à Willem Pijper for flute and piano, from 10 compositions of the same title by various composers (1957)
- Quintet No.2 for winds (1962)
- Quattro pezzi for flute and harp (1963)
- Aere festivo for 3 trumpets and 2 trombones (1965)

Piano

- Etude No.2 (1937)
- Sonata for 2 pianos (1943)
- Cadenzas for Mozart Piano Concertos, KV 175, 238, 246, 386, 413, 456, 455, 459, 466, 467, 482, 491, 503, 537 and 595 (1946–1947, 1995)
- Sonata for piano (1958)

Choral

- Driehonderd waren wij..., Cantata for mixed chorus and orchestra (1933, 1944); text by Andries de Hoghe
- Bericht aan de levenden for mixed chorus, orchestra and reciter (1964–1965); text by H. M. van Randwijk
- Tre aspetti d'amore for mixed chorus and orchestra (1967–1968); texts after Peter Abelard and Boëthius

Vocal

- Ballade for alto and small orchestra (1936); text by Charles d'Orléans
- De tooverfluit, 5 songs for tenor and orchestra (1946); text by Bertus Aafjes
- Drie liederen (3 Songs) for voice and piano (1964); text by Clara Eggink, Bertus Aafjes and Adriaan Roland Holst
- Villonnerie for baritone and orchestra (1965); text by François Villon
- Voici trois bohémiens, song from Provence for voices and piano (1968)
- Canzoni amorose del duecento for soprano, baritone, piano and orchestra (1972–1973); text by Rustico di Filippo
- Chamber Music, cycle of 8 songs for tenor and small orchestra (1991); poems by James Joyce

Other

- Voor de wind for carillon (1968)

Orchestrations

Henkemans orchestrated piano compositions and other works. They are published by Donemus.

- Préludes – Book 1 (1971) and Book 2 (1913, 1972) by Claude Debussy
- Villanelle for horn and orchestra (1984) by Paul Dukas; original for horn and piano (1906)
