= Jeanne Beijerman-Walraven =

Dutch composer (1878–1969)

Jeanne Beijerman-Walraven (14 June 1878 – 20 September 1969) was a Dutch composer. She was born in Semarang, Dutch East Indies, and studied privately with Frits Koeberg in The Hague.

Beijerman-Walraven's early compositions were late Romantic in style, but she adopted contemporary techniques and later works became more Expressionist. Although she received recognition early in her career, her work was seldom played after the 1920s. She died in Arnhem.

== Works ==
Selected works include:

- Concert Overture for orchestra, 1910
- Orkeststuk for orchestra, 1921
- Lento and Allegro moderato for orchestra, 1921
- Sonata, violin, pianoforte, 1909, 1952
- Koraal, organ/pianoforte, 1911
- String Quartet, 1912
- 2 stukken, pianoforte, 1929
- Andante espressivo con molta emozione, pianoforte, 1950
- Pan (H. Gorter), S, pf
- Het is winter, S, pf
- Licht mijn licht, SATB
- Uit de wijzangen (R. Tagore, trans. F. van Eeden), Mezzo-soprano, pianoforte, before 1916
- Ik moet mijn boot te water laten, Nu mogen alle vregdewijzen zich mengen; De zieke buur (F. Pauwels) orchestra, 1922
- In den stroom (H. Keuls), song, 1924
- Feestlied (Keuls), soprano, pianoforte/orchestra, 1926
- Om de stilte (Keuls), song, 1940
- Mère (3 poèmes de M. Carême), low violin, pianoforte, 1950
- De ramp (Renée), song, 1953
