= Phantastron =

A Phantastron is a type of electron tube oscillator or timer circuit. It was invented during radar development during World War 2. It was described in the Radiation Laboratory series of books, in particular the one on waveforms.

== Components ==
- Resistors
- Capacitors: determine the frequency of the oscillations and filters in the circuits.
- Vacuum tubes: provides a current of electrons being shot.
- Top panel and turret board: the outside covers of electron tube oscillator or timer circuit.
