= Willem Andriessen =

Dutch pianist and composer

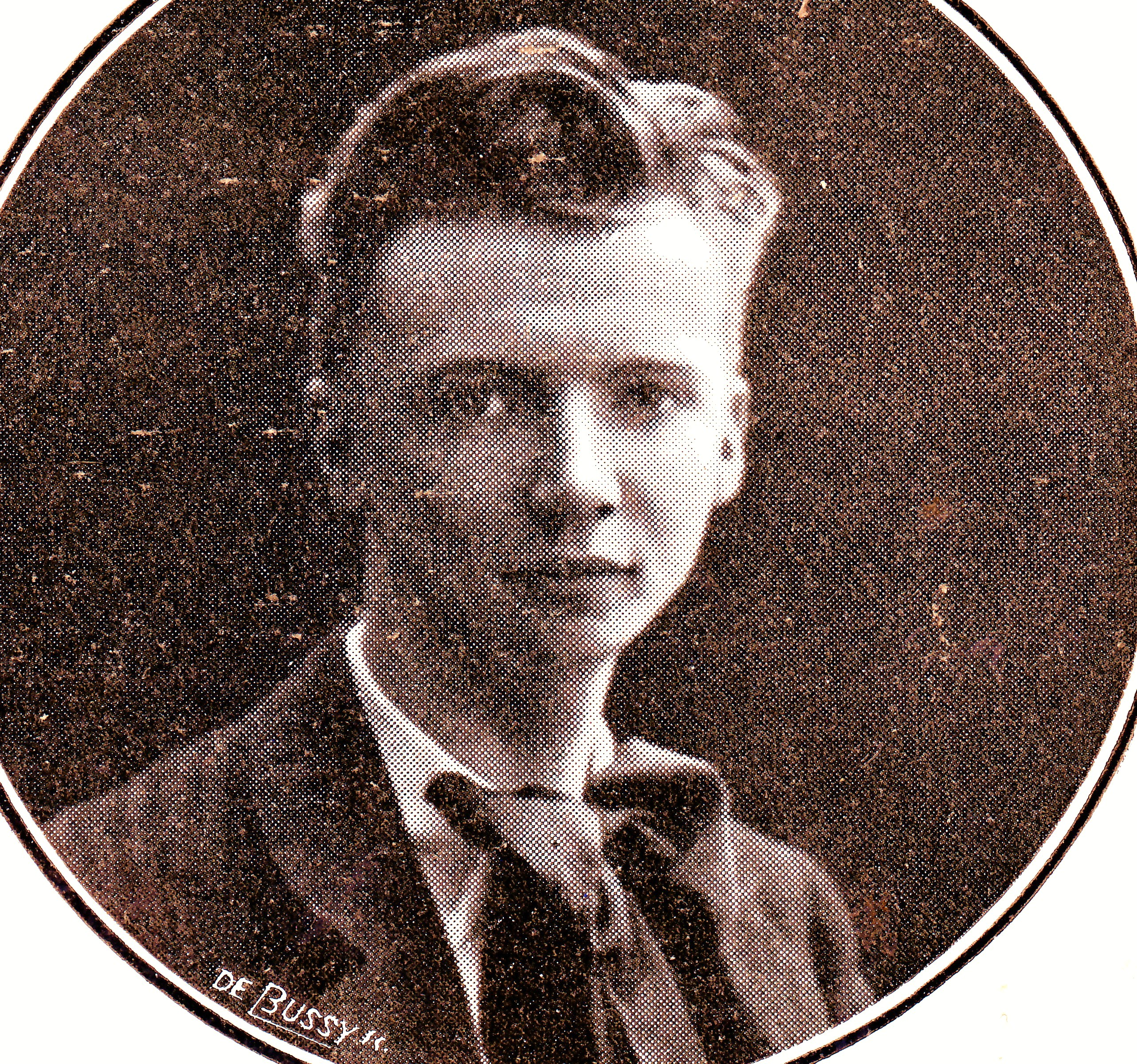
Willem Andriessen

Willem Andriessen (Haarlem, October 25, 1887 – Amsterdam, March 29, 1964) was a Dutch pianist and composer. His compositional output was small due to the demands of performance and teaching, but he was nonetheless awarded a number of compositional prizes in Belgium and the Netherlands.

He was the older brother of composer and organist Hendrik Andriessen and the uncle of Louis Andriessen and Jurriaan Andriessen, who followed in his footsteps as composers.

== Biography ==
Andriessen studied at the Amsterdam Conservatory, completing his studies in 1906, and was awarded the school's Outstanding Achievement Prize for piano. He appeared frequently in concert performances in the Netherlands, and was noted for his interpretations of J.S. Bach, Mozart, Beethoven and Robert Schumann, though he also played piano pieces from contemporaries such as Debussy, Ravel, Bartók and Willem Pijper.

Andriessen taught at the Royal Conservatory in The Hague (1910–18) and following this at the Muziekschool in Rotterdam after 1924. He was appointed director of the Amsterdam Conservatory from 1937 to 1953. He also gave radio broadcasts of performances which included analyses of compositions. In 1942, following the Nazi occupation of the Netherlands, Andriessen and his brother Hendrik were imprisoned in Kamp Sint-Michielsgestel for a year, during which time Willem gave lecture-concerts for the prisoners.

== Andriessen family tree ==
- Willem Andriessen
- Hendrik Andriessen (1892–1981), composer and organist, married pianist Johanna Justina Andriessen (1898–1975)
  - Heleen Andriessen (1921–2000), flautist
  - Jurriaan Hendrik Andriessen (1925–1996), composer
  - Caecilia Andriessen (1931–2019), pianist, teacher, composer
  - Louis Andriessen (1939–2021), composer and pianist

== Works ==
=== Orchestral ===
- Overture (1905)
- Piano Concerto in Db (1908)
- Scherzo, Hei, t'was in de Mei (1912, R/1956)

=== Choral ===
- Mass (1914–16)
- Sub tuum praesidium (1943, for male chorus)
- Salve coeli digna (1944)
- Ave Maria (1954, for female chorus)
- Exsultate deo (1954)
- Missa brevis (1963)

=== Solo vocal ===
- 4 liederen (1906)
- Bruidsliederen (1909)
- 3 liederen (1909)
- 3 liederen (1911)
- 2 liederen (1913)

=== Solo piano ===
- Sonata (1934)
- Praeludia (1942–50)
- Sonatine (1945)
- Praeludium (1960, for the left hand)

== Sources ==
- Jos Wouters, Ronald Vermeulen. "Willem Andriessen". The New Grove Dictionary of Music and Musicians online.
