= Philippe Blanchard =

German mathematical physicist

- Born: 1942 (age 82–83)

Philippe Blanchard (born January 1942) has been a Professor of Mathematical Physics at Faculty of Physics, Bielefeld University since 1980. He is both director of the Research Center BiBoS (Bielefeld-Bonn Stochastics) and deputy managing director of the Center for Interdisciplinary Research (Zentrum für interdisziplinäre Forschung, ZiF) at Bielefeld University.

== Academia ==
Blanchard is also the editor of Progress in Mathematical Physics, Mathematical Methods in Physics, Analysis and Geometry, and Fundamental Theories of Physics.

Among his 240 scientific publications are books such as Mathematical and Physical Aspects of Stochastic Mechanics (with P. Combe & W. Zheng, 1987), Mathematical Methods in Physics: Distributions, Hilbert Space Operators and Variational Methods (with E. Brüning, 2002), and Mathematical Analysis of Urban Spatial Networks (with D. Volchenkov, 2008).

Blanchard's fields of interest comprise the application of functional analysis and probability theory (stochastic analysis, random graphs), quantum and statistical physics (percolation theory, self-organized criticality), epidemiology (disease spreading), and sociology (learning as a social process, social contagion).

== Research ==
- NEMO – Network Models, Governance and R&D collaboration networks (EU, 2006–2009)
- Network formation rules, random set graphs and generalized epidemic processes (Volkswagen Foundation, 2006–2009);
- From basic concepts and methods on the structure and function of complex networks to modeling of concrete real-world networks (Volkswagen Foundation, 2004–2006)

== Selected publications ==
- Blanchard, Philippe; Röckner, Michael; Russo, Francesco (1 September 2010). "Probabilistic representation for solutions of an irregular porous media type equation". The Annals of Probability. 38 (5). Institute of Mathematical Statistics. arXiv:0805.2383. doi:10.1214/10-aop526. ISSN 0091-1798.
- Hongler, M.-O.; Filliger, R.; Blanchard, Ph. (22 December 2009). "Hyperbolic angular statistics for globally coupled phase oscillators". EPL (Europhysics Letters). 89 (1) 10001. IOP Publishing. arXiv:0911.4699. doi:10.1209/0295-5075/89/10001. ISSN 0295-5075. S2CID 119254344.
- Kondratyev, V. N.; Blanchard, Ph. (24 February 2010). "Spinodal regions due to disorder in superferromagnets". Physica Status Solidi B. 247 (3). Wiley: 685–687. Bibcode:2010PSSBR.247..685K. doi:10.1002/pssb.200983018. ISSN 0370-1972. S2CID 119633242.
- Blanchard, Ph.; Volchenkov, D. (2009). "Probabilistic embedding of discrete sets as continuous metric spaces". Stochastics. 81 (3–4). Informa UK Limited: 259–268. arXiv:0804.4434. doi:10.1080/17442500902917326. ISSN 1744-2508. S2CID 18549623.
- Blanchard, Philippe; Hellmich, Mario; Ługiewicz, Piotr; Olkiewicz, Robert (2009). "Continuity and generators of dynamical semigroups for infinite Bose systems". Journal of Functional Analysis. 256 (5). Elsevier BV: 1453–1475. doi:10.1016/j.jfa.2008.05.013. ISSN 0022-1236.
- Volchenkov, D.; Blanchard, P. (16 July 2008). "Markov Chain Methods for Analyzing Urban Networks". Journal of Statistical Physics. 132 (6). Springer Science and Business Media LLC: 1051–1069. arXiv:0710.3566. Bibcode:2008JSP...132.1051V. doi:10.1007/s10955-008-9591-2. ISSN 0022-4715. S2CID 15737265.
- Blanchard, Philippe; Volchenkov, Dimitri (22 April 2008). "Intelligibility and first passage times in complex urban networks". Proceedings of the Royal Society A: Mathematical, Physical and Engineering Sciences. 464 (2096). The Royal Society: 2153–2167. arXiv:0710.0996. Bibcode:2008RSPSA.464.2153B. doi:10.1098/rspa.2007.0329. ISSN 1364-5021. S2CID 18712141.
- Blanchard, Ph. (2008). "Composite systems: Entanglement, envariance, events and Born's rule". The European Physical Journal Special Topics. 159 (1). Springer Science and Business Media LLC: 37–45. Bibcode:2008EPJST.159...37B. doi:10.1140/epjst/e2008-00691-1. ISSN 1951-6355. S2CID 122532564.
- Blanchard, Philippe; Brüning, Erwin; Petruccione, Francesco (2008). "Editorial". The European Physical Journal Special Topics. 159 (1). Springer Science and Business Media LLC: V. Bibcode:2008EPJST.159D...5B. doi:10.1140/epjst/e2008-00686-x. ISSN 1951-6355.
- Blanchard, Ph.; Gandolfo, D.; Ruiz, J.; Wouts, M. (27 May 2008). "Thermodynamic vs. topological phase transitions: Cusp in the Kertész line". EPL (Europhysics Letters). 82 (5) 50003. arXiv:0803.1921. Bibcode:2008EL.....8250003B. doi:10.1209/0295-5075/82/50003. ISSN 0295-5075. S2CID 6659235.

== Sources ==
- University Bio
