= Utrechts Conservatorium =

Music school in Utrecht, Netherlands

Coordinates: 52.0893°N 5.1173°E

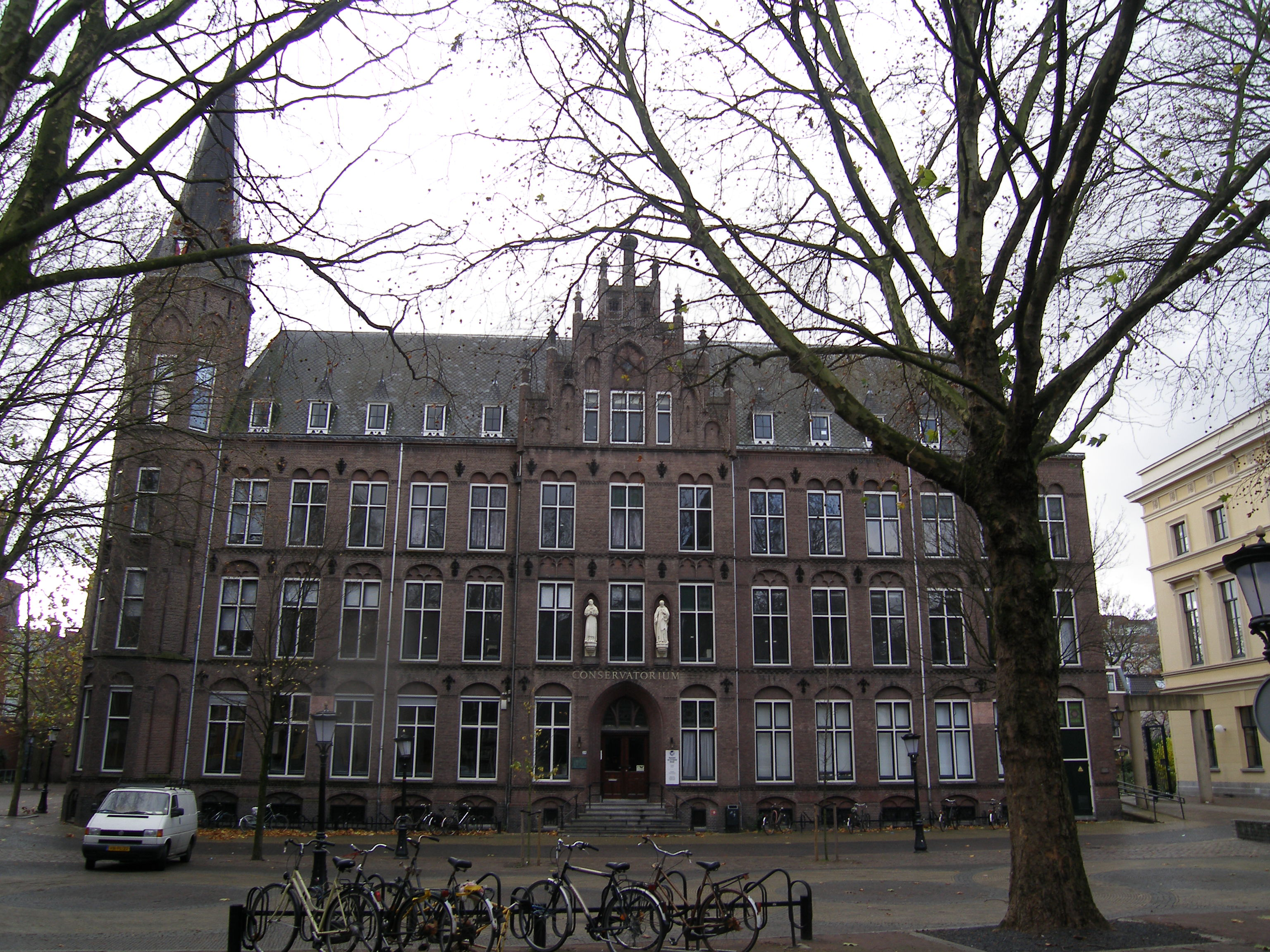
The former Joannes de Deo hospital. This building, and the building on the far right are now the Utrechts Conservatorium

The Utrechts Conservatorium is a Conservatory of Music in Utrecht, Netherlands, that is part of the Utrecht School of the Arts (HKU). The conservatory opened in 1875 and is one of the eldest professional musical education institutes of the Netherlands. Since 1971, the conservatory is located in the former concert hall Gebouw voor Kunsten en Wetenschappen (Building for Arts and Science) and in the former hospital St. Joannes de Deo, both on the same street. Apart from these two buildings, the Nederlandse Beiaardschool (Dutch Carillon School), located in Amersfoort, is also part of the school. The Utrechts Conservatorium merged in 1987 with the Carillon School and the Nederlands Instituut voor Kerkmuziek (Dutch Institute for Church Music) into the Faculty of music of the Utrecht School of the Arts.

The conservatory has six study directions:

- Bachelor of Music in Jazz & Pop
- Bachelor of Music in Classical Music
- Historical Performance
- Carillon
- Bachelor of Music in Education
- Musician 3.0 (experimental music)

== Musicians ==
=== Notable alumni ===
- Willem Jeths
- Tristan Keuris
- Janine Jansen
- Herman van Veen
- Wouter Hamel
- Peter Kardolus
- Bas Ramselaar
- Gerard Beljon - Composer
- Rudjer Glavurtic - Composer

=== Notable faculty ===
- Philippe Hirschhorn
- Ton de Leeuw
- Charlotte Margiono
- Emmy Verhey
- Zino Vinnikov
- Piet Noordijk
