= Samuel Maju Samehtini =

Dutch musician and composer

Samuel Maju Samehtini (14 March 1816 – 10 December 1879) was a Dutch musician and composer.

== Jewish-Italian background ==
Samehtini was born in Middelburg, in the province of Zeeland, on 14 March 1816, as the oldest son of the textile merchant and then music teacher Maju Lion (Meijer Levi) Samehtini and Fijtje Emanuel (Kunstenaar). His family was of Jewish-Italian origin and was well known in the Dutch music scene for about a century.

== The Hague period ==
Thanks to the scholarship from the 'Maatschappij tot Bevordering der Toonkunst', which the young Toonkunst-Department of Middelburg promoted him for, he could visit the Koninklijke Muziekschool (the present-day Royal Conservatory) in The Hague. This fact is commemorated in the earliest surviving composition of Samehtini, a vocal piece with instrumental accompaniment entitled 'Dankbare proeve' from 1833. The piece was written when he was just 16 or 17 years old. Samuel Maju finished his education most successfully, being part of the Court Chapel of The Hague.

== Return to Middelburg ==
After finishing his education, he offered his services to the people of his home town by placing an advertisement in the Middelburgsche Courant in August 1834. At his house in the Hoogstraat in Middelburg, music lovers could enjoy violin-, piano-, guitar- or singing classes.

== Leeuwarden period ==
In 1839, he moved to Leeuwarden in the province of Friesland as a music teacher. In the Frisian capital he soon became famous both as a violinist and as a conductor and composer. He was allowed to write a festive march for the visit of King William III to Leeuwarden on 29 April 1852. His work was performed by the Leeuwarden 'Muziekvereniging Crescendo Euphonia' as part of a torch lit serenade on the Gouverneursplein and was received enthusiastically by the public. Samehtini's 'Leeuwarder Polka' is most likely part of his productive Leeuwarden years.

== Marriage ==
On 16 August 1848, Samehtini got married in Leeuwarden to stockbrokers daughter Carolina Neumark, who gave him six children. One of them was the famous horn player, conductor, and energetic composer Maurits Samehtini (1863-1943).

== Amsterdam period ==
Samehtini moved from Leeuwarden to Amsterdam, where he continued his (main) job of music teacher. He left his home near the 'Vrouwenpoort', one of Leeuwardens city gates, in the autumn of 1854, to live in Amsterdam. Here, in the summer of 1873, he celebrated his silver wedding anniversary. In honour of the deceased Dutch writer and linguist Jacob van Lennep (1802-1868), he wrote a funeral march for the piano.

== Death ==
Six years after the silver wedding anniversary Samehtini died on 10 December 1879 in his home near the Rokin in Amsterdam. According to a mourning ad he died after a short illness. Two days later the funeral took place on the Jewish Cemetery 'Zeeburg' (now part of the Flevopark). The newspaper Algemeen Handelsblad of that month mentioned him as a 'schepper van menige gelukkige compositie' ('creator of many well made compositions'). His music classes were very much appreciated.
