= Hans Kockelmans =

Dutch musician

Hans Kockelmans (born 20 February 1956) is a Dutch composer, teacher, and performer of Early Classical and electronic music.

He studied baroque lute with Mijndert Jape, as well as electronic music, and classical guitar at the Maastricht conservatory.

In his compositions he is a pioneer of granular synthesis. His electronic music as well as his acoustic work frequently refers to medieval themes. He composes for such unusual instruments as the Phantastron.

He has collaborated with Roman Turovsky on a number of experimental compositions involving lute and torban.

Hans is a nephew of Dutch composer Gerard Kockelmans. He lives in Maastricht and is active in an organization of composers in his region, Dutch Limburg.
