= Cornélie van Oosterzee =

Dutch pianist and composer (1863–1943)

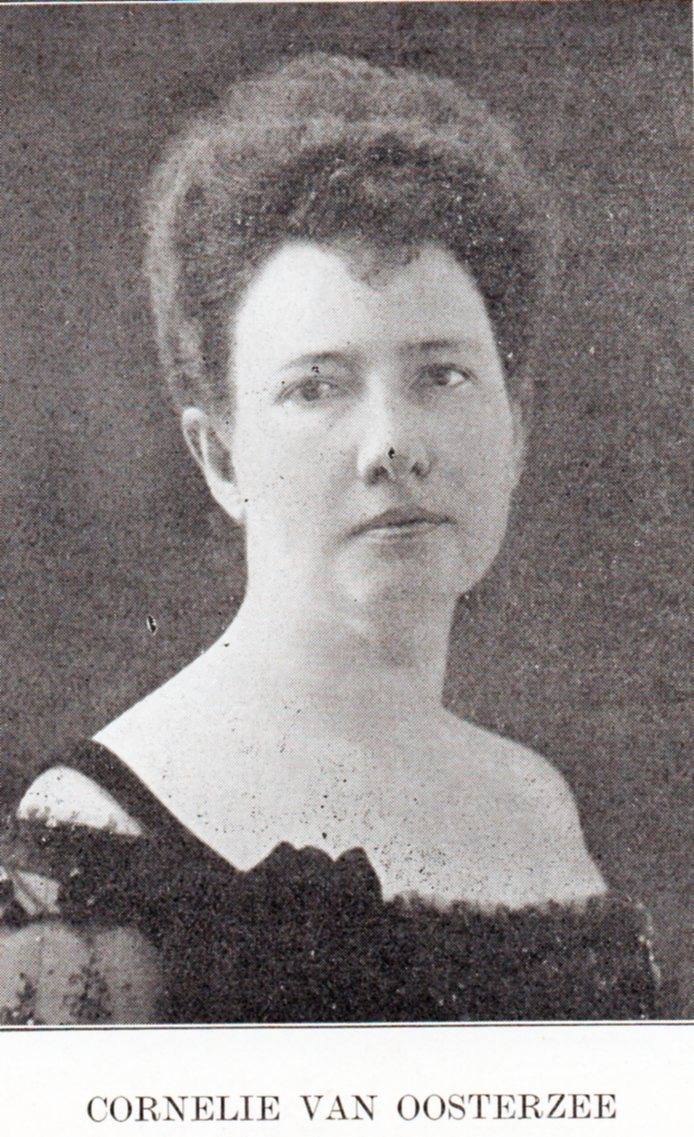
Cornélie van Oosterzee

Cornélie van Oosterzee (16 August 1863 – 12 August 1943) was a Dutch pianist and composer.

== Biography ==
Cornélie van Oosterzee was born on August 16, 1863, to Pieter Cornélis van Oosterzee and Johanna Theophanie Bernardina in Jakarta (then Batavia). She had six siblings: three brothers and three sisters.

At the age of 5, Cornelie moved with her family to The Hague from Jakarta. There, she began piano lessons with Carel Wirtz at the Royal Conservatoire The Hague and at age 16 started music theory lessons under composer and organist Willem Nicolaï. Her studies ended in 1883, when her family moved to the Dutch East Indies. Describing the end of her musical career as a "great cover-up" in letters to Clara Schumann, Cornelie asked for advice about the future, and was encouraged to pursue a career as a concert pianist. Returning to the Netherlands upon the death of her mother in 1888, Cornélie resumed her classes with Nicolaï but left soon after for Berlin upon the advice of her friends Julius Rontgen and Johannes Masschaert.

After 2 years in Berlin, she moved to Stuttgart to study with composers Samuel de Lange and Robert Radecke. Soon she returned to Berlin upon her acceptance into Heinrich Urban's Master School of Instrumental Composers.

In Berlin, Cornélie Van Oosterzee wrote primarily orchestral works. Although she remained there for the rest of her life, she was acclaimed in the Netherlands: She was made a Knight of the Order of Oranje-Nassau in 1897. She also composed and conducted an opening cantata for the opening of the Nationale Tentoonstelling van Vrouwenarbeid in The Hague in (1891). Not much is known about the end of Van Oosterzee's life, but she lived with her sister in Berlin until her death in 1943.

Approximately 40 of her pieces have been preserved. It is believed that many of her works were lost during the Battle of Berlin.

== Works ==
Influenced Wagner and Strauss, Van Oosterzee composed in a late romantic idiom. She wrote choral works, songs, piano music, chamber music, an opera, and various orchestral works. The only work of hers referencing her time in Indonesia is Sechs leichte Klavierstucke op.55, which included a Malaiisches Wiegenliedchen and a Javanische Tanz.

Selected works include:

- Das Gelöbnis opera (1910)
- Koningsidyllen symphonic poem after Tennyson
- Nordische Phantasy
- Prelude to Iolanthe
- Te Bethlehem (1895)
- Chansons Sentimentales op.54 (1905)
- Symphony in F minor
- Cantata for opening the National Exhibition for Women's labor in 1898
