= Daan Manneke =

Dutch composer and organist (born 1939)

- Manneke (2016)

Background information
- Born: 1939 (age 86–87); Kruiningen, Netherlands
- Occupations: Composer, organist
- Instrument: Pipe organ
- Website: www.daanmanneke.nl

Daan Manneke (born 7 November 1939) is a Dutch composer and organist.

Manneke was born in Kruiningen. He studied organ and composition from 1963 to 1967 at the Brabant Conservatory in Tilburg, under Huub Houët and Louis Toebosch (organ) and Jan van Dijk (composition). Manneke then studied organ with Belgian organist Kamiel d’Hooghe in Brussels, followed by composition with Ton de Leeuw in Amsterdam.

In 1976 he was awarded The Composition Prize at the Amsterdam Sweelinck Conservatory, where he now teaches composition and analysis of 20th-century music. He was conductor of Cappella Breda, and has made numerous recordings with them (Dufay, Willaert, Bruckner, Strawinsky, Pärt, Ton de Leeuw, Manneke).

== Works ==
He has written over 90 works in various styles, and is particularly known for his organ and choral music.

== Selected recordings ==
- works on Invisible Cities Quink Vocal Ensemble, Telarc 1996
