= Gerard Kockelmans =

Dutch composer, conductor and music teacher

Gerard Kockelmans (May 5, 1925 in Meerssen - September 7, 1965 in Beek), was a Dutch composer, conductor and music teacher.

He studied at the conservatoires of Maastricht, The Hague and Utrecht, where Kees van Baaren, Sem Dresden and Henri Geraedts were among his teachers.

He mainly wrote choral music. Other works comprise masses, motets, chamber music and songs. He was a master of counterpoint. Although he was clearly influenced and inspired by the twelve-tone music, which was very popular in his day, he never completely embraced this style. Hence his music, although ‘modern’, sounds accessible and comprehensible. Towards the end of his life, he practiced the so-called ‘serial’ style of composition, which he developed himself.

As a choir conductor and music teacher, Kockelmans was influential in the music scene of Limburg. Amongst the choirs he conducted were the ‘Maartrichts mannenkoor’, ‘oratoriumvereniging Nieuw Leven’, ‘Mignon’ and ‘Maastrichter Staar’.

He was also an uncle of composer Hans Kockelmans.
