= Bernard Zweers =

Dutch composer and music teacher

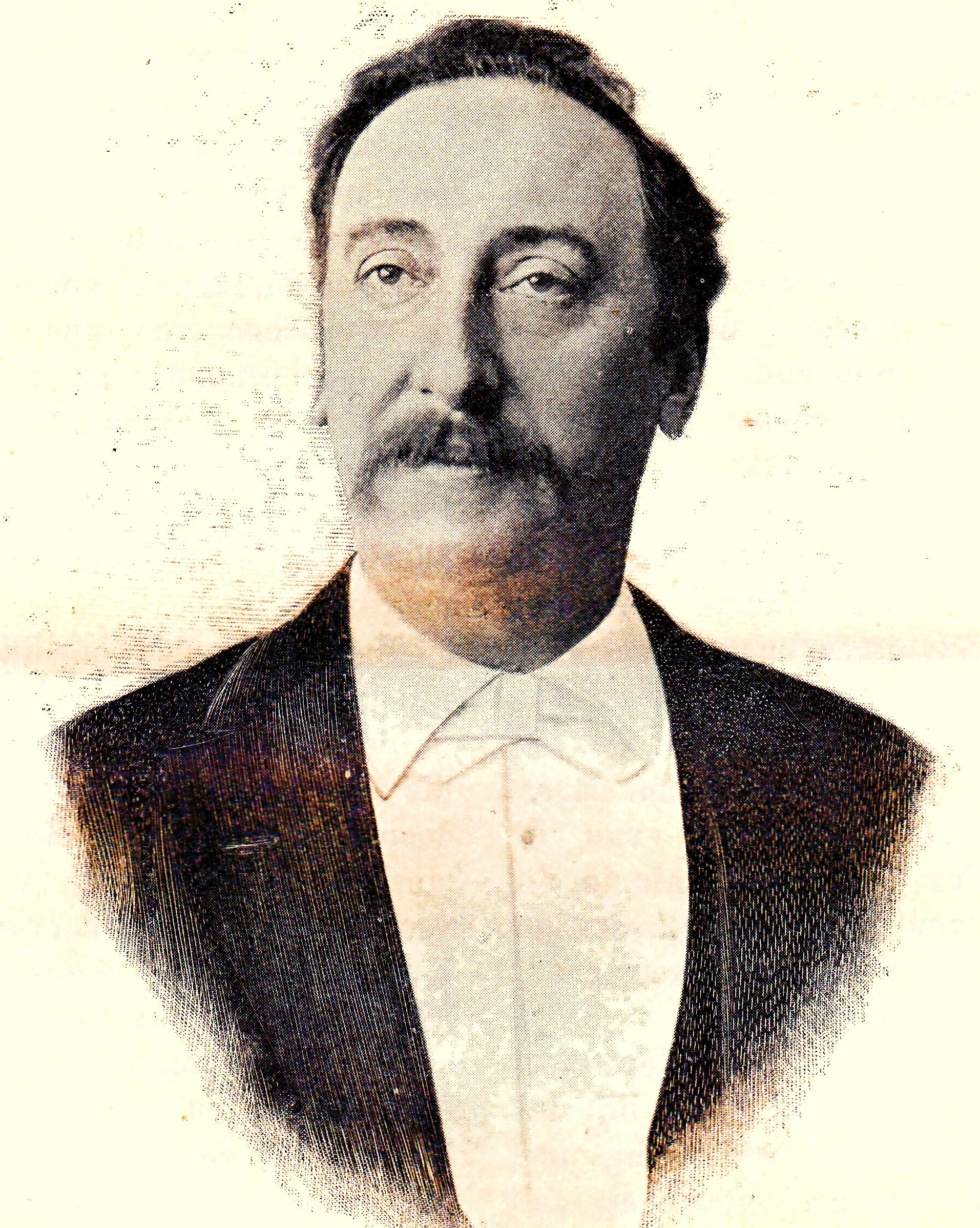
- Born: 18 May 1854; Amsterdam
- Died: 9 December 1924 (aged 70); Amsterdam

Bernard Zweers (born Bernardus Josephus Wilhelmus Zweers) (18 May 1854 – 9 December 1924) was a Dutch composer and music teacher.

== Life ==
Bernard Zweers was born in 1854 as the son of an Amsterdam book- and music shopkeeper and piano tuner. Although his father was an amateur singer, he strongly disapproved of his son's musical interests, expecting him to follow him in the family business. Being fundamentally self-taught, he had some minor musical successes before his parents finally approved and sent him to study with Salomon Jadassohn in Leipzig in 1881–1883. Of crucial importance to Zweers' musical education was his first exposure to the work of Richard Wagner when he was present at the Berlin premiere of the Ring des Nibelungen, in 1881:

I, who never ventured farther than Nijmegen and who had never heard even a normal opera before, I was in Berlin, listening to Wagner's Ring! ... and I returned a full-blooded Wagnerian.

A 1924 newsreel of Zweers

After his return, he became active in Dutch musical life and took on various appointments, including the conductorship of various choirs. However, due to deterioration of his hearing abilities and his own wish to concentrate on teaching, he relinquished most of these. From 1895 to 1922 he was head of teaching and composition at the Amsterdam conservatory but rather than impose his own music on his pupils, he left them the freedom to develop their own style - a break with the policies of his predecessor Johannes Verhulst. He became a highly esteemed, even revered teacher to a whole generation of Dutch composers.

Aside from his didactic abilities, Zweers was renowned for his sense of humour. At one meeting of the Dutch Musicians' Association (Nederlandse Toonkunstenaars Vereeniging), Zweers' Second Symphony was programmed along with Huyschenruyter's Concert Overture. Just before the concert, Huyschenruyter approached Zweers to tell him how much he'd enjoyed his symphony (in rehearsal). After a moment's silence, Zweers responded: "Sir, I have not heard your overture, but I am certain that my symphony is on a higher level". Dumbstruck by this display of artist's arrogance, Huyschenruyter stood silent until Zweers burst out laughing: "Of course, because your overture is in D, and my symphony is written in E flat!"

== Work ==
In 1907, the Leiden professor Petrus Blok published the last part of his History of the Dutch People, dedicated to the arts. However, he totally ignored music, claiming Dutch music did not possess any 'national character'. The composer Johan Wagenaar published a rebuttal, in which he claimed that 'true' Dutch music could be characterised by a 'simple, spirited or firm melody, by a sense of the cosy and quietly sensitive, a sharp rhythm and, finally, a sense of humour'. Wagenaar named two works as an example: Peter van Anrooy's Piet Hein Rhapsody, an orchestral pot-boiler based on a popular song about the seventeenth century Dutch naval hero Piet Hein and Bernard Zweers' Third Symphony, subtitled 'To My Fatherland'. Indeed, Zweers could be said to be the most overtly nationalistic of all Dutch composers. Not in the sense that, like so many other European composers, he based his music exclusively on folk music, but more in his exploitation of national themes.

However, there is a strange dichotomy in Zweers' ideas about music. On the one hand, he strived to develop a specifically Dutch brand of music, free from foreign influence. For instance, his vocal music only employs Dutch-language texts, and when it has a programme, that is frequently inspired by Dutch themes: Rembrandt, Vondel's Gijsbrecht van Aemstel, Dutch landscapes, and so forth. His aim was the greater good of Dutch art, because "Never will art get a foothold with a people, when it uses a foreign language in song, or when it takes in art by means of foreign tongues". On the other hand, the German influences in his music are undeniable. His Second Symphony is thoroughly Wagnerian; his Third gave him the epithet 'the Dutch Bruckner'. One cannot imagine Zweers much appreciating that honour (and it really is undeserved as well, since the only Brucknerian thing about the work is its length).

That Third Symphony (1887–1889) was to become by far Zweers' most famous work. Its large scale prohibited it from being performed very often and made publication expensive (the publisher A.A. Noske experienced a great loss as sales were poor), but the work was, and is, regarded as a milestone in the development of Dutch music, combining folk tunes with a lyrical description of Dutch landscapes. It was therefore unavoidable that Wagenaar should use it as an example of 'typical' Dutch music.
