= Ton de Leeuw =

Dutch composer

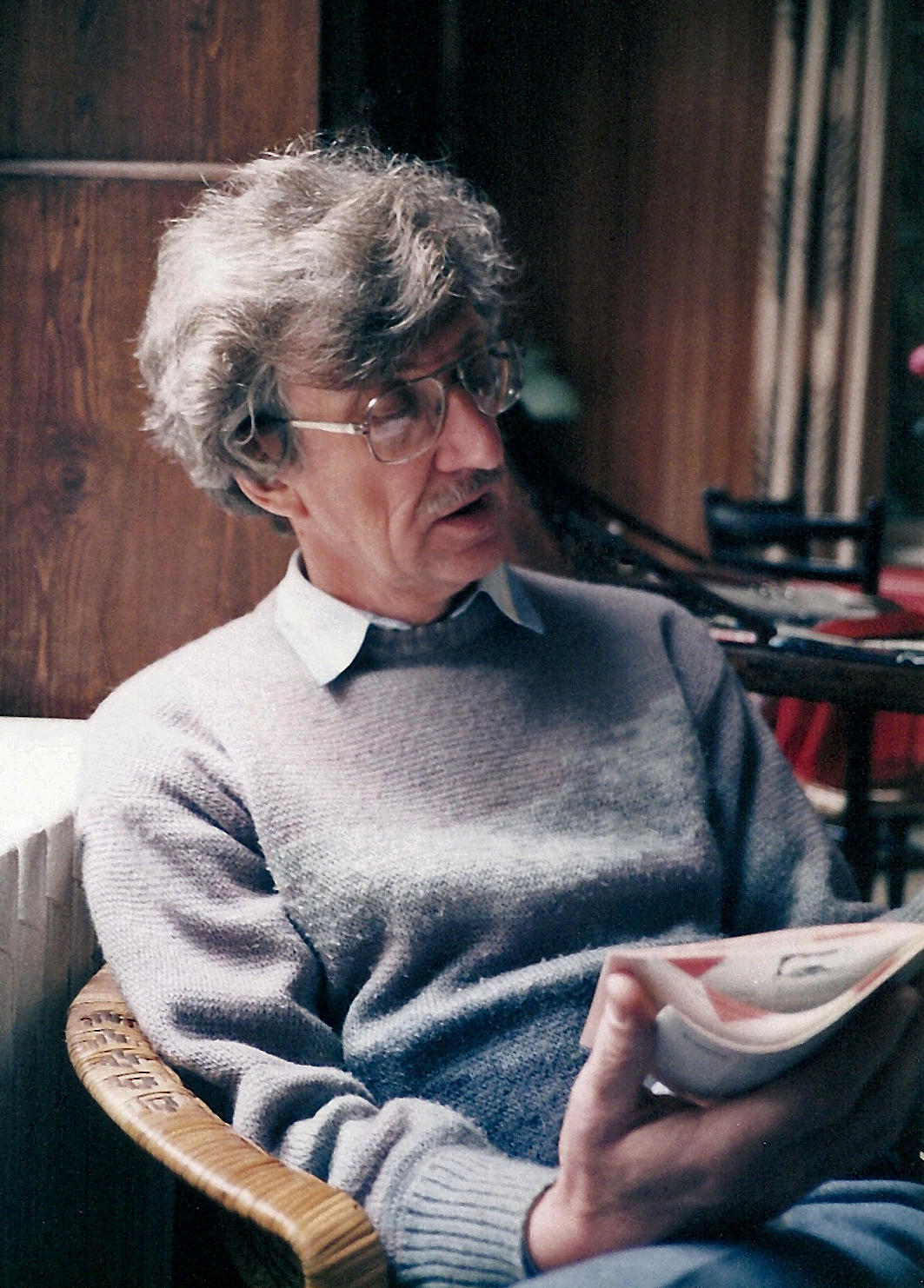
Image of Ton de Leeuw

Antonius Wilhelmus Adrianus de Leeuw (Rotterdam, 16 November 1926 - Paris, 31 May 1996) was a Dutch composer. He occasionally experimented with microtonality.

== Life and career ==
Taught by Henk Badings, Olivier Messiaen and others, and in his youth influenced by Béla Bartók, De Leeuw was a teacher at the University of Amsterdam and later professor of composition and electronic music at the Sweelinck Conservatory in Amsterdam from 1959 to 1986, at which institute he served as director from 1971–73. For his notable students, See: List of music students by teacher: K to M#Ton de Leeuw.

"When I was quite young I once accidentally tuned in on a radio broadcast from an Arabian station. I was thunderstruck: I became deeply aware that there were other people living on this earth, living in thoroughly different conditions, having other thoughts and feelings" (Ton de Leeuw, 1978).

He studied ethnomusicology with Jaap Kunst between 1950 and 1954 and the encounter with the Dagar brothers and Drupad on his first visit to India in 1961 deepened a lifelong interest in "transculturation". Since then he has travelled throughout the world: Japan, Indonesia, Australia, the Philippines, Persia, the Sovjet Union, Hungary, Bulgaria and Finland, where he hold workshops and lectures on the East-West relationship in music. In the seventies De Leeuw and André Jurres initiated the renowned Music-Cultural gatherings Musicultura at Queeckhoven House in Breukelen, the Netherlands. See: The World of Music Vol. 20, No. 2, Musicultura: Three Orient-Occident Encounters organized by the Eduard van Beinum Foundation—Final Report (1978), pp. 10–14. This manifested itself in his work for Western instruments by the occasional use of microtonality, as in his String Quartet No. 2 (1964), as well as in compositional plans; Gending (1975) (Note: Grove gives the wrong date in one place, besides "UCLA, Berkeley" for UC Berkeley) for Javanese gamelan is a rare foray into writing for non-western instruments. In 1956 Ton de Leeuw was awarded the Prix Italia for his radiophonic oratorio Job.

He wrote three operas, all to his own libretti, including a television opera Alceste (1963, after Euripides), the one-act De Droom ("the Dream", 1963), and finally Antigone (1989–1991, after Sophocles). In 2005 his 1964 book on twentieth-century music was published in English translation as Music of the Twentieth Century: A Study of Its Elements and Structure (Amsterdam: University Press, 1995), also in Swedish and German.

Olivier Messiaen wrote about his later works: 'Ton de Leeuw's music is essentially diatonic. He uses modes, melodic lines, counterpoints, chords, but it all remains diatonic. Hardly any discords. The colour white, or just a shade bluish, sometimes a golden light is added. Treatment of the 12 voices in his work about the “Cantique des Cantiques” [Song of Songs] also remains diatonic, both in his pianissimo and forte. His work on part of “l’Apocalypse” [The Book of Revelation] provides a new timbral element with staccato of the horn and the clarinet. Plainsong is introduced in his “Psaumes pour la Messe des Morts” [Psalms for the Requiem Mass], as well as dramatic effects where the beating of the tam-tam comes up against the ostinatos of the marimba, against the calls of the female voice. There are even bunches of chords with the use of modes. But the spirit always remains diatonic in a static way that is very close to the type of oriental music which penetrates the listener and gets him into a semi-oneiric state, the state of a waking dream.'

Ton de Leeuw wrote about 160 compositions, spanning the whole range from solo pieces to complete operas, but it is the vocal and, more specifically, the choral works which reveal most clearly what he was striving to obtain: a conjunction of the essence of past and present, a link between Eastern and Western thought, and the result was a unique purity of expression.

His last work, 'Three Shakespeare Songs', was performed on 13 June 1996 by Rosemary Hardy with the Ensemble InterContemporain.

== Selected recordings ==
- Mouvements rétrogades Concertgebouw Orchestra, George Szell, BFO, 1988
- Mouvements rétrogades Hague Philharmonic Orchestra, Ernest Bour, Olympia, 1989
- Modal Music for accordion Miny Dekkers, BFO 1990
- Sweelinckvariations for organ Lien van der Vliet, Composers Voice, 1991
- Symphonies of Winds Rotterdam Philharmonic Orchestra, Edo de Waart, Composers Voice, 1992
- Haiku II for soprano and orchestra, Elena Vink, Hague Philharmonic Orchestra, Ed Spanjaard, Composers Voice, 1992
- Les Adieux for piano René Eckhardt, NMClassics 1992
- Hommage a Henri for clarinet and piano Sjef Douwes, Jan Gruithuyzen NMClassics, 1992
- Résonances for orchestra, Hague Philharmonic Orchestra, Ed Spanjaard, Composers Voice, 1992
- Trio for flute, bass clarinet and piano Harrie Starrveld, Harry Sparnaay, René Eckhardt NMClassics, 1992
- Cinq hymnes Netherlands Chamber Choir, Reinbert de Leeuw, Gerrit Kommerson, Paul Prenen, piano, Herman Halewijn, Ger de Zeeuw, percussion, NMClassics, 1993
- Men go their ways for piano Ivo Janssen, NMClassics, 1994
- Men go their ways for piano Ljuba Moiz, Dynamic, 2001
- Danses sacrées for piano and orchestra, David Kuyken, Netherlands Radio Chamber Orchestra, NMClassics, 1994
- Missa brevis Quink Vocal Ensemble, Telarc 1996
- Prière Quink Vocal Ensemble, Telarc 1996
- En begheeft mij niet Quink Vocal Ensemble, Telarc 1996
- Egidius, waer bestu bleven Quink Vocal Ensemble, Telarc 1996
- Het visschertje Quink Vocal Ensemble, Telarc 1996
- Antigone Martine Mahé, Nederlands Kamerorkest, Reinbert de Leeuw, NM 1996
- Gending Ensemble Gending, Jurrien Slighter, NMClassics 1996
- Three Shakespeare Songs Rosemary Harding, Ensemble InterContemporain, David Robertson, Globe1997
- Prière Netherlands Chamber Choir, Ed Spanjaard NMClassics, 2000
- A cette heur du jour Netherlands Chamber Choir, Ed Spanjaard NMClassics, 2000
- Cloudy Forms Netherlands Chamber Choir, Ed Spanjaard NMClassics, 2000
- Car nos vignes sont en fleur Netherlands Chamber Choir, Ed Spanjaard NMClassics, 2000
- Elégie pour les villes détruites Cappella Amsterdam, Daniel Reuss, Q Disc, 2003
- Complete works for piano René Eckhardt, Quintone, 2010
- Sonatine for violin and piano Philippe Graffin, violin; Jelger Blanken, piano, Onyx 2011
- Improvisation on the Dutch Christmas carol 'Midden in de winternacht' Philippe Grafin, violin; Jelger Blanken, piano, Onyx 2011
