= Singer Pur =

German vocal sextet

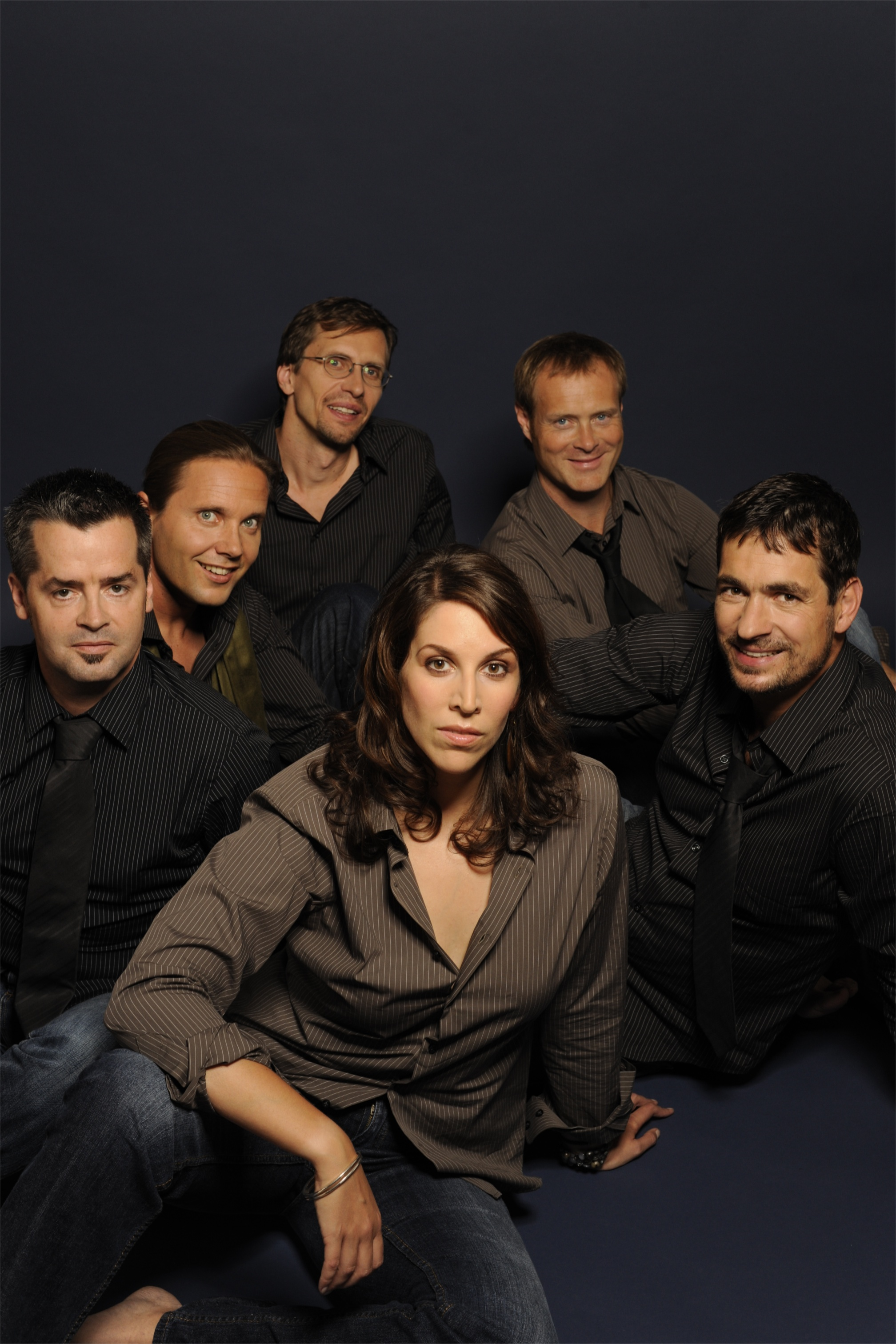
- The six members in 2013

Background information
- Origin: Regensburg, Germany
- Genres: a cappella music
- Years active: 1991–present
- Website: www.singerpur.de

Singer Pur is a German vocal sextet founded in 1991 by former members of the Regensburger Domspatzen. The five original members were joined by a soprano in 1994. The sextet is focussed on classical music, but who have also performed and recorded traditional folk songs and pop music. Singer Pur have recorded more than 30 CDs. Singer Pur have given concerts and workshops in nearly 60 countries all over the world.

== Members ==
=== Recent members ===
- Claudia Reinhard – soprano
- Christian Meister – tenor
- Markus Zapp – tenor
- Manuel Warwitz – tenor
- Jakob Steiner – baritone
- Felix Meybier - bass

=== Former members ===
- Caroline Wegmann – soprano
- Hedwig Westhoff-Düppmann – soprano
- Ulrike Hofbauer – soprano
- Claus Werner – tenor
- Christian Wegmann – tenor
- Guido Heidloff – baritone
- Andreas Hirtreiter – tenor
- Thomas E. Bauer – baritone
- Klaus Wenk – tenor
- Rüdiger Ballhorn – tenor
- Reiner Schneider-Waterberg – baritone
- Marcus Schmidl – bass

== Discography ==
- 1994 - Singer Pur Vokalsolistenensemble - Lassus: four works, Johnny Mercer: Emily, Ludwig Senfl, Ralph Vaughan Williams, Palestrina, Ivan Moody: The Wild Swans at Coole, György Ligeti, Guillaume Dufay, Max Reger Al Jarreau, Luca Marenzio.
- 1995 - Factor Orbis Tomás Luis de Victoria, Orlando di Lasso, Josquin des Prez, Ludwig Sennfl, Cypriano de Rore Alexander Utendal, Conrad Rupsch, Jacob Obrecht, Philippe de Monte, Ranlequin de Mol, Hans Leo Haßler Jacobus Gallus, William Byrd, Gesualdo. Ars Musici
- 1996 - Nordisk Vokalmusik Nordic Vocal Music - Wilhelm Stenhammar, Håkan Parkman, Nils-Erik Fougstedt, Einojuhani Rautavaara, Nils Lindberg, Heikki Sarmanto, Erna Tauro, Wilhelm Peterson-Berger, Ulf Långbacka, sv:Maurice Karkoff, Björn Kruse, Trond Kverno, Arne Mellnäs, David Wikander, Bo Hansson, Elisabet Hermodson. Ars Musici
- 1997 - Musik für Stimmen Music for Voices. Weiss and Douglas (arr. Hans Huber): What a Wonderful World, Claude Debussy Trois chansons de Charles d’Orléans John Cage, Ivan Moody, György Ligeti, Hans Leo Haßler, Jacobus Clemens non Papa, Orlando di Lasso Ludwig Sennfl, Ninot le Petit, Cypriano de Rore, Paul Patterson, Johannes Brahms, Irish traditional The little green lane, Wilhelm Stenhammar, Friedrich Silcher, Joseph Gabriel Rheinberger, Neil Hefti. Ars Musici
- 1999 - Orlando di Lasso: Tous les regrez Ars Musici
- 2002 - Jacobus Gallus: Moralia Harmoniae Morales Latin secular works 3CD (excerpts on 1CD) Ars Musici
- 2003 - Ahi Vita Monteverdi, Gesualdo, Phinot and Striggio with clarinettist de:Michael Riessler
- 2003 - Electric Seraphim Singer Pur & de:Go Guitars. Works for choir and electric guitars Dufay, Pipelare, Venosa, Cage, Pärt, Michael Hirsch, Bernhard Weidner and Fredrik Zeller. K&K Verlagsanstalt
- 2004 - Rihm, Sciarrino, Moody, Metcalf - Wolfgang Rihm: Tenebrae factae sunt, Salvatore Sciarrino: Responsorio delle tenebre a sei voci, Ivan Moody: Lamentation of the Virgin, Joanne Metcalf. with The Hilliard Ensemble
- 2005 - Herztöne - Lovesongs. Nils Lindberg, trad. Londonderry Air, Johannes Brahms, Werner R. Heymann, Erroll Garner, Evert Taube, Robert Schumann, Thomas Ravenscroft, Felix Mendelssohn-Bartholdy, Jacques Chailley, George Gershwin, Percy Grainger, Carroll Coates: "London by night," Volkslied, Burt Bacharach, Volksweise, Chick Corea, Billy Joel.
- 2006 - SOS - Save Our Songs!
- 2007 - Das Hohelied der Liebe - Settings from the Song of Songs - Dominique Phinot, Ivan Moody Canticum Canticorum II (1994) Leonhard Lechner, Guillaume Dufay, Brian Elias, Jean Richafort, Heinrich Schütz, Joanne Metcalf, John Plummer, Ludwig Sennfl, Wilhelm Keller
- 2008 - Memento: George de La Hèle, Wolfgang Rihm, Pärt, Lassus
- 2008 - Drei Schiffe sah ich segeln nach Bethlehem! German Christmas carols for mixed choir: Hans Schanderl, Reiko Füting, Peter Wittrich, William Hawley, Wolfram Buchenberg
- 2009 - Adrian Willaert: Musica Nova 1559 (Vol.I - Petrarch madrigals 2CD)
- 2010 - Letztes Glück - Songs of the German Romantics: Works by Johannes Brahms, Robert Schumann, Friedrich Silcher, Franz Schubert, Richard Strauss, Max Reger and Felix Mendelssohn-Bartholdy. Oehms
- 2012 - Sting: Singer Pur sings Sting Sting a-cappella
- 2010 - Jeremiah - Lamentations by Palestrina and Gesualdo with de:David Orlowsky clarinet Sony Classics
- 2011 - Renaissance am Rhein - motets, songs and chansons of the 16th century Petit Jean de Latre, Nicolaus Zangius, Andreas Pevernage, Konrad Hagius, Martin Peudargent, Johannes de Cleve, Orlando di Lasso, Johannes Mangon
- 2012 - Roland de Lassus Biographie musicale vol. II (Vol.I is by another ensemble) Musique en Wallonie
- 2013 - Adrian Willaert: Musica Nova 1559 (Vol.II - motets 3CD) Oehms
- 2013 - Gioseffo Zarlino Modulationes sex vocum (1566) Singer Pur
- 2015 - Der Singer Pur Adventskalender - 24 German Advent songs
- 2016 - Gavin Bryars - The I Tatti Madrigals
- 2016 - Advents- und Weihnachtszeit mit Singer Pur Advent songs and Christmas carols
- 2017 - Sagenhaft! - 25 Jahre Singer Pur
- 2017 - Best of Singer Pur a double CD with 35 songs out of productions with the label OehmsClassics from the years 2003-2015
- 2019 - Horizons - Der Geist weht, wo er will
- 2021 - Lou Koster: Der Geiger von Echternach - a cantata for solo voices, piano, violin and vokal ensemble
- 2021 - Among Whirlwinds - compositions by women for voices Frauen
- 2022: Musica Divina - Göttliche Vokalmusik aus der Schatztruhe Carl Proskes
- 2022: SENFL featuring Ensemble Leones

=== Publications ===
- (book) Sheets: SOS - Save Our Songs! - German folksongs edited for mixed choir, Schott Music ED 20301
- (book) Sheets: Drei Schiffe sah ich segeln nach Bethlehem - German Christmas carols edited for mixed choir, Schott Music ED 20711
- (book) Sheets: Der Singer Pur Adventskalender - 24 German Advent songs edited for mixed choir, Schott Music ED 22344
