= 1576 in music =

== Events ==
- Pierre-Francisque Caroubel relocated to Paris.
- Carolus Luython becomes court organist and composer to Rudolf II, Holy Roman Emperor, at Vienna.

== Publications ==
- Giammateo Asola
  - Vespertina majorem solennitatum psalmodia for six voices (Venice: Girolamo Scotto), also includes two Magnificats
  - Missa pro defunctis (Mass for the dead) for four voices (Venice: Angelo Gardano)
- Lodovico Balbi – Second book of madrigals for four voices (Venice: Angelo Gardano)
- Antoine de Bertrand – Les amours de Pierre Ronsard put to music for three voices (Paris: Le Roy & Ballard), a chanson cycle setting texts from Pierre de Ronsard's Les Amours
- Fabrice Caietain – Airs for four voices (Paris: Le Roy & Ballard), contains settings of poems by Ronsard and other contemporary poets
- Thomas Crecquillon – Motets for four, five, six and eight voices (Leuven: Pierre Phalèse), published posthumously
- Estevan Daça – El Parnasso (Valladolid: Diego Fernando de Cordova), a collection of pieces for the vihuela
- Andrea Gabrieli – Ecclesiasticarum cantionum, liber primus for four voices (Venice: Angelo Gardano)
- Marc'Antonio Ingegneri – First book of motets for five voices (Venice: Angelo Gardano)
- Orlande de Lassus
  - Patrocinium musices, Part 5 (Munich: Adam Berg), a collection of Magnificats for four, five, six, and eight voices
  - Third book of schöner, neuer, teutscher Lieder for five voices (Munich: Adam Berg)
- Luzzasco Luzzaschi – Second book of madrigals for five voices (Venice: Angelo Gardano)
- Giovanni de Macque – First book of madrigals for six voices (Venice: Angelo Gardano)
- Tiburtio Massaino
  - Psalms for four voices (Venice: Angelo Gardano)
  - First book of motets for five and six voices (Venice: Giuseffo Guglielmo)
- Philippe de Monte – Third book of madrigals for six voices (Venice: Angelo Gardano)
- Leonhard Päminger – Tertius tomus ecclesiasticarum cantionum... (Third book of ecclesiastical songs), published posthumously in Nuremberg
- Bonifacio Pasquale – I salmi che si cantano tutto l'anno al Vespro a cinque voci et un Magnificat a otto... (Venice: Girolamo Scotto)

== Classical music ==
- Luzzasco Luzzaschi – Quivi sospiri

== Births ==
- October – Thomas Weelkes, organist and composer (d. 1623)

== Deaths ==
- January 19 – Hans Sachs, meistersinger (b. 1494)
- August – Bálint Bakfark, Hungarian and Polish composer and lutenist (b. 1507; plague)
- probable
  - David Abell, organist and composer
  - Josquin Baston, court composer
  - Jan van Wintelroy, Franco-Flemish composer and choirmaster
