= Jacob Bathen =

Flemish bookseller, printer and publisher

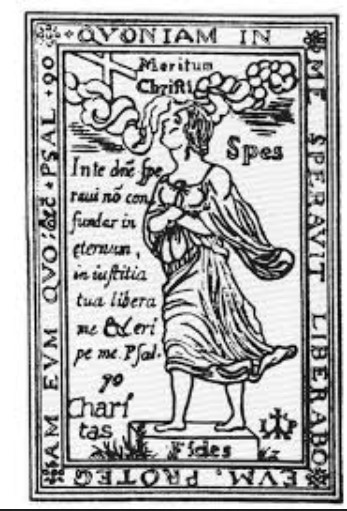
Jacob Bathen's Spes Imprint

Jacob Bathen or Jacob Baethen, Latinised as Jacobus Bathius, Iacobus Batius and Jacobus Bathenius (likely Leuven or Heverlee, in or before 1516 - Leuven ?, 1558), was a 16th-century bookseller, printer and publisher from the Duchy of Brabant in the Habsburg Netherlands, mainly known now for music publications. He is sometimes confused with Johannes (Jan or Johan) Baethen, a printer active in Leuven and Cologne between 1552 and 1562, who was likely his brother. Jacob was active in Leuven, Maastricht and Düsseldorf. He is mainly remembered for his publication of the so-called Maastricht songbook of 1554, which is one of only five surviving song books in the Dutch language from the 16th century.

== Life ==
Little is known about the early life of Jacob Bathen as many of the Leuven city records relating to the period of his life have been lost. It is believed that he was born in Leuven in or before 1516. He parents were Arnold Bathen and Marie Stroots. He had two brothers named Johan or Jan (who was possibly also a printer) and Godfried. Bathen grew up on the homestead in Vinckenbosch (Vinkenbos), which was on the property of Park Abbey just outside Leuven. In 1530 he matriculated under the name 'Jacobus Baten de Parco' as an artes (arts) student at Leuven University. He graduated Master of Arts about 1535.

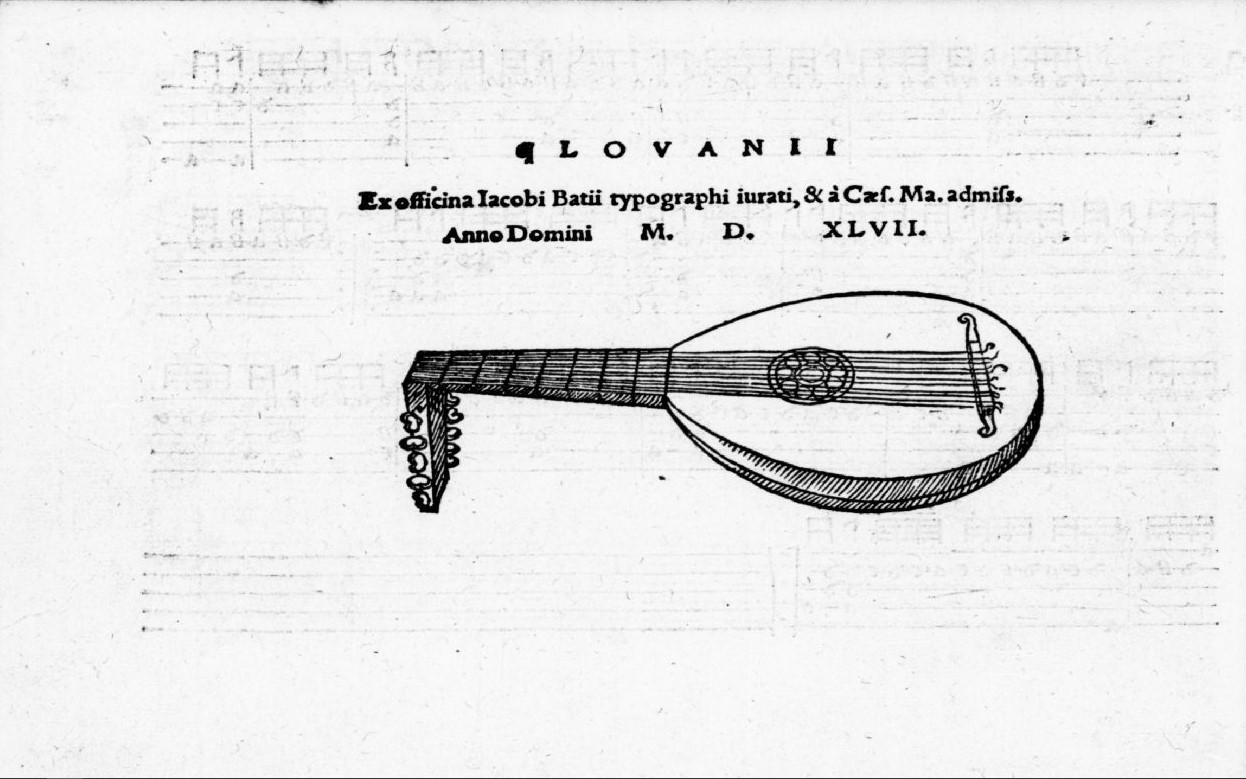
Colophon of 'Des chansons reduictz en tabulature de lut ...' published by Phalesius in 1547

Bathen trained in the art of printing, most likely with a printer based in Leuven, who may have been Servaas van Sassen (also called Servatius Sassenus). He may also have worked for some time as a corrector or proofreader at this printing press. He started out as a printer for his own account in 1545 working in partnership with Reynier Velpen van Diest. He obtained on 4 November 1546 and 5 October 1547 patents that permitted him to print and sell books. These patents apparently did not extend to bookbinding. It looks very much as if Jacob Bathen was one of the two bookbinders or booksellers who stamped their bindings with the Spes plate stamp. Possibly the lines of the IB monogram form the initials of Bathen's name.

He worked as a book printer for local publishers such as Petrus Phalesius, a publisher who specialized mainly in musical scores. For Phalesius he printed the first, third, fourth and perhaps also the fifth edition of the collection Des chansons reduictz en tabulature de lut a deux, trois et quatre parties …, Leuven, 1547. This was the first musical edition of Phalesius and the first collection of scores for lute in the Low Countries. In addition to music scores, Bathen printed official publications and religious pamphlets, some of which were published by Petrus Phalesius and Martinus de Raymaker (known as 'Martinus Rotarius').

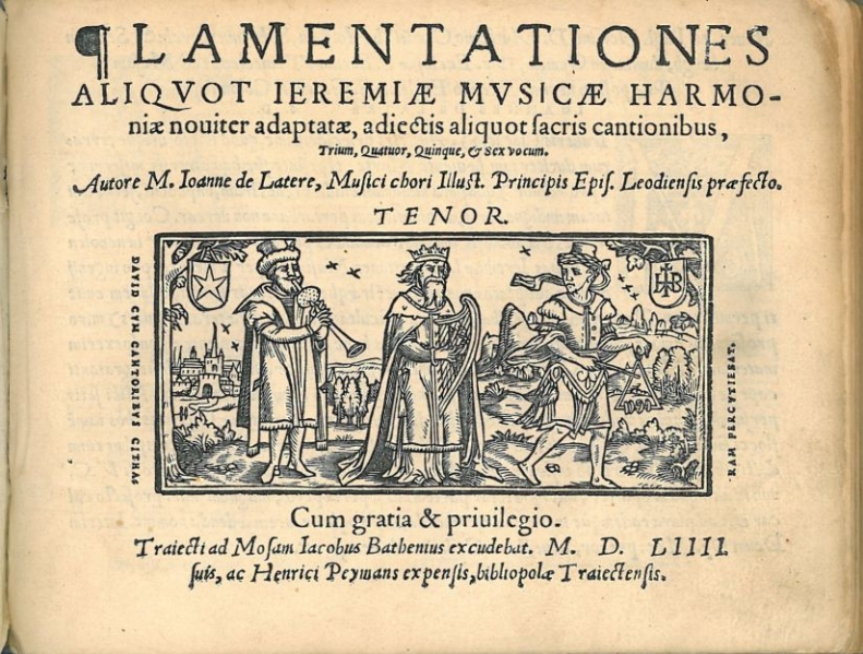
Title page of Jean de Latre's 'Lamentationes aliquot Ieremiae', part for tenor, published by Baethen in 1554

Bathen married Katrien van den Berghe with whom he had at least six children. The competition in the Leuven printing market was fierce and to cope with it some printers partnered up with one another. The difficulty to make ends meet likely forced Jacob Bathen to leave Leuven at the end of 1551 or early 1552 and to settle in Maastricht. Here he was the first printer and as a result he operated in a cultural environment in which he was unlikely to find many customers. In three or four years, he published at least eleven books, including two music editions. In 1554 he printed a musical work in Maastricht by the composer Jean de Latre from Liège. The work was entitled Lamentationes aliquot Jeremiae musicae harmoniae noviter adaptatae, adjectis aliquot sacris cantionibus, trium, quatuor, quinque et sex vocum and was dedicated to Anton of Schauenburg, at that time the dean of the Saint Servatius chapter in Maastricht, and later archbishop of Cologne. Bathen used so-called 'movable musical note types' for the first time. The movable types are now in the Heilbronn city library and constitute one of the most important musical artefacts from this period.

In Maastricht Bathen was still not able to thrive as a printer and bookseller. At the end of 1554 or the beginning of 1555 he moved his business to Düsseldorf to become a printer at the court of the Duke of Jülich, Willem V van Kleef. Here he was the first publisher of polyphonic songs. In 1555-1556 he published three bundles of motets for the heirs of Arnold Birckmann. In 1557 he published a music theory book by the Dutch teacher, publisher and music theorist Johannes Oridryus, entitled Practicae musicae utriusque praecepta brevia. The typeface that Bathen used in Maastricht and Düsseldorf for his music editions is the same as that used by Phalesius in Leuven during this period. It has been assumed that Bathen took it with him from Leuven. It is not clear whether it was Bathen or Phalesius who invented this font.

In the end Bathen's business did not fare better in Düsseldorf. Jacob Bathen returned before 1558 to his parental home near Heverlee possibly travelling via Cologne where his brother Johan is believed to have been active as a printer at the time. In 1558 Johannes Oridryus and his cousin Albertus Buysius continued Bathen's printing business in Düsseldorf. It was in particular Oridyrus who ensured that Bathen's music printing materials were put to good use. Oridyrus and Buysius, among others, published another fifty psalms (Souterliedekens), set to music by Cornelis Boscoop.

Bathen died in 1558, probably in Leuven or Heverlee. His widow remarried.

== Printed works ==
A total of 57 publications have been ascribed to the printing press of Bathen. While Bathen's speciality was certainly the printing of musical works with musical notation such as staves and tablature for the lute, his press also printed ordinances and decrees for both religious and government authorities and works on a wide range of subjects such as mathematical, poetical, medical and grammatical works, sermons and musical treatises.

== Niewe Duytsche Liedekens (The Maastricht Songbook), 1554 ==
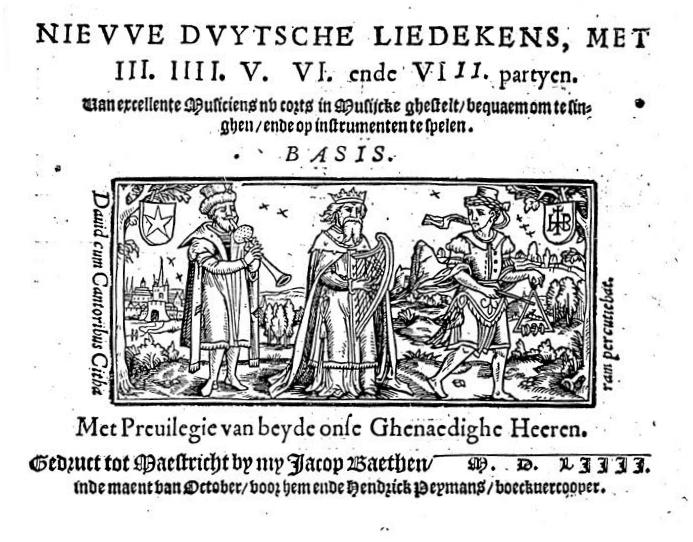
Title page of Niewe Duytsche Liedekens. published by Bathen in Maastricht in 1554

His best-known work is the Niewe Duytsche Liedekens, met III. IIII. V. VI. ende VIII. partyen (New Dutch songs in 3, 4, 5, 6 and 8 parts), printed in 1554. The publication is also referred to as 'Dat ierste boeck vanden Niewe Duytsche Liedekens (That first book of New Dutch songs) as well as The Maastricht Songbook, first of all because of the place where it was published. The title page shows in the background a panorama of some landmarks of Maastricht and includes the city arms with a single star hanging from a tree branch. The publication groups polyphonic Dutch songs by various composers, of whom some were famous in their time such as Jacobus Clemens non Papa and others who were of rather local renown such as Ludovicus Episcopius, Franciscus Florius and Jean de Latre. When the music printer Petrus Phalesius for whom Bathen had previously printed some publications, published in 1572 in Leuven his collection of Dutch-language songs under the title Een Duytsch musyck boeck (A Dutch music book), no less than half of the songs were copied from The Maastrich Songbook.

One of the principal reasons why the publication is relevant for music history is that the songs collected in it were in the Dutch language. The compositions in The Maastricht Songbook used the standard written Dutch that was common at that time. At the time of publication, secular music for the elite was primarily written in the French language. Even Dutch-language composers tended to use French or even Italian for their songs. The first music publisher in the Dutch (Flemish) speaking world to challenge this dominance of French was Tielman Susato, a music publisher and composer active in Antwerp. Susato launched an appeal to Flemish and Dutch-speaking composers to create songs in their mother tongue in order to show that native language music was not inferior to that made with French, Latin or Italian lyrics. Susato issued his appeal in his lerste musyck boexken (First music booklet) of 1551. This publication included four-part vocal music composed in the Dutch language. Susato followed up with a Tweeste musyck boexken (Second music booklet) in the same year, and continued to print Dutch-language songs with the three-part Souterliedekens (Psalter-songs) by Clemens non Papa (1556–57) and the four-part Souterliedekens by Gerardus Mes (1561), both published in four volumes. Susato's initiative was taken up by other Flemish publishers the first of whom was Jacob Bathen with The Maastricht Songbook of 1554. Phalesius would follow in Leuven in 1572 with Een Duytsch musyck boeck, half of the songs of which were recycled from The Maastricht Songbook.

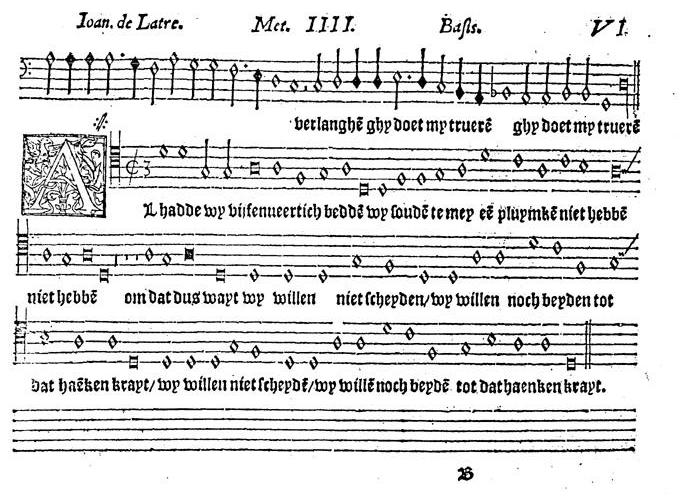
Sheet music for the song "Al hadde wy vijfenveertich bedde" by Jean de Latre from the "Niewe Duytsche Liedekens"

The Maastricht Songbook contains music by a number of local composers. Eight compositions are by Ludovicus Episcopius and these are the only ones in five, six and eight parts. Other composers chose were working in other locations in the Netherlands, including Jacobus Clemens non Papa in Bruges who worked in 's Hertogenbosch and probably Ypres, Jan van Wintelroy who was active in 's-Hertogenbosch and Servaes van der Meulen who worked in Bergen op Zoom. The composers Joannes Zacheus, Claudius Salmier, Theodor Evertz and Pierken Jordain who also had works included in the publication remain fairly unknown otherwise and it is not known where they worked. The soprano part in the five part books has been lost. It has been possible to recover the soprano part for some songs as they were also included in Phalesius' Een Duytsch musyck boeck and some other documents.

The Maastricht Songbook was most likely used for entertainment by the upper and middle class of that time. The prevalent theme of the songs is love, and in particular the May songs which describe how the blooming and awakening of spring makes the blood of lovers race. In the song De Iustelijcke mey (The joyful May) (no. 4) a lover presents his sweetheart with a May branch. Some of the love songs are quite suggestive, such as the Een aerdich meysken seer jonck van jaren (A nice girl, very young of age) (no. 28) in which a shepherd lets his 'piglet' root in the girl's 'garden'.

Some of the songs in The Maastricht Songbook clearly have a comical intention, such as a number of songs that deal with drinking including one by the respectable religious composer Clemens non Papa. There is also a humorous song called Ick zou studeren in eenen hoeck (I would study in a corner) (no. 15) describing a student who cannot concentrate on his studies because of the noisy street outside.

== Selected works printed by Jacob Bathen ==
- Aristotle, Arithmeticae practicae, 1. De elementis; 2. De fractioninus; 3. De regulis mercatorum, et societatibus pulcherrimis; 4. De proportione, Jacob Bathen, Reinerus Velpius, Leuven?, ca. 154?
- Martin Lipsius, Chromatii episcopi qvotqvot extant lvcvbrativncvlae, Chromatius Aquileiensis, Jacob Bathen, Leuven: ex officina Iacobi Batii, 1546
- Actorum colloqvii Ratisponensis vltimi, quomodo inchoatum, ac desertum, quæq[ue] in eodem extemporali oratione inter partes…, Martinus Rotarius, Jacob Bathen, Leuven, apud Martinum Rotarium, 1547
- Jean Bérot, Antoine de Perrenin, Co[m]mentarium sev potivs diarivm expeditionis Tvniceae, a Carolo V. [...] anno M.D.XXXV. susceptæ, Jacob Bathen, Petrus Phalesius, Martinus Rotarius, Leuven, excudebat Iacobus Batius, 1547
- Livinus Brechtus, Evripvs. Tragoedia Christiana nova, Jacob Bathen, Petrus Phalesius, Martinus Rotarius, Leuven, apud Martinum Rotarium & Petrum Phalesium, 1549
- E divi Iustiniani institutionibvs erotemata, sev, interrogationes, in legalis militiæ Tyronum vsum, Justinianus I keizer van het Byzantijnse Rijk, Jacob Bathen, Petrus Phalesius, Christophorus Phreislebius, Martinus Rotarius, Leuven, apud Martinum Rotarium, & Petrum Phalesium, 1549
- Ortensio Landi, Forcianæ qvaestiones, In quibus uaria Italorum ingenia explicantur, multaq[ue], alia scitu non indigna, Jacob Bathen, Martinus Rotarius, Leuven, excudebat Iacobvs Bathenivs, 1550
- Petrus Nannius, Dvarvm sanctissimarvm martyrvm Agathae et Lvciæ dialogismi, Cornelius Musius, Martinus Rotarius, Jacob Bathen, Leuven: apud Martinum Rotarium, 1550
- Het mantelken des lydens ben ick ghenaempt, Jacob Bathen, for Lenaert Scrapen, Maastricht, ca. 1550?
- Augustinus Hunnaeus, De dispvtatione inter disceptantes, dialecticè instituenda, libellus. Cuius maxime & propè necessarius vsus est [...] Prætereà, Merten Verhasselt, Jacob Bathen, Leuven, apud Martinum Verhasselt, September 1551
- Algerus Leodiensis, Johannes Costerius, Guitmundus Aversanus, Desiderius Erasmus, Lanfrancus Cantuariensis and 2 more, De veritate corporis et sangvinis Domini nostri Iesv Christi in evcharistiae sacramento, cum refutatione diuersarum circa hoc..., Leuven, apud Petrum Phalesium, 1551
- Franciscus Fabricius, Van den warmen baden, ende in sunderheyt den genen die tot Aken sijn, wat crachte dat sy hebben, en[de] wie mansie ghebruycken..., Jacob Bathen, Maastricht, 1552
- Jean Guyot de Châtelet, Minervalia Ioan. Gvidonii [...] in quibus scientiæ præconium atque ignorantiæ socordia consideratur. Artium liberalium in musicen decertatio lepida appingitur: et etiam iuuentuti ad virtutem calcar proponitur, Jacob Bathen, Maastricht, 1554
- Niewe Duytsche Liedekens, met III. IIII. V. VI. ende VIII. partyen (New Dutch songs in 3, 4, 5, 6 and 8 parts), Maastricht, Jacob Bathen, 1554
- Petit Jean de Latre, ‘’Lamentationes aliquot Ieremiæ Musicæ Harmoniæ nouiter adaptatæ, adiectis aliquot sacris cantionibus, Trium, Quatuor, Quinque, & Sex vocum ... Acuta Vox. (Contratenor.) (Tenor.) (Basis.) (Quinta et Sexta Pars.)’’ Maastricht, Jacob Bathen, 1554
- Martin Peu D'argent, Liber Primus Sacrarum Cantionum quinque vocum, quæ vulgo Moteta vocantur ... Acuta Vox. (Contratenor.) (Tenor.) (Basis.) (Quinta Pars.), Düsseldorf, Sumptibus hæredum Arnoldi Birckmanni, excudebat Iacobus Bathenius, 1555
- Johannes Oridryus, ‘’Practicae Musicae utriusque praecepta brevia eorumque exercitia valde commoda ex optimorum musicorum libris ea dumtaxat, quae hodie in usu sunt, studiose collecta‘’, Düsseldorf, Jacobus Bathenius excudebat, 1557
