= Jan Belle =

Flemish composer and music theorist (fl. 1545–1566)

- Born: 1545
- Died: 1566 (aged 20–21)
- Occupations: Composer and music theorist

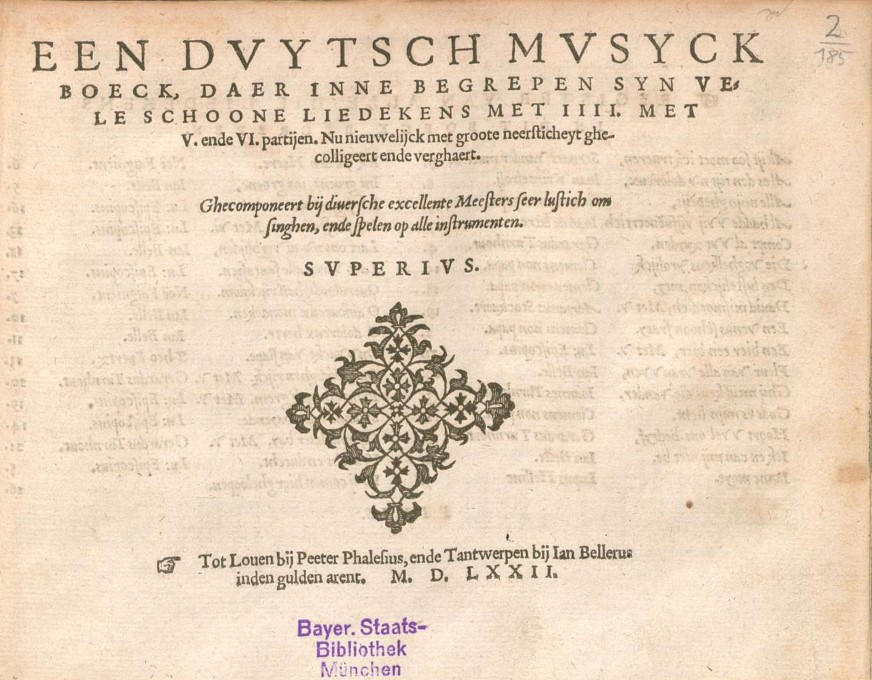
Title page of Een Duytsch musyck boeck published by Phalesius and Bellerus in 1572

Jan Belle (fl. 1545 – 1566) was a Flemish composer from the Franco-Flemish School and a music theorist.

== Live ==
Between 1546 and 1547, Belle was a magister duodenorum (master of the choirboys) at the Holy Cross Church in Liège. He was referred to as "de Lovanium", which indicates that he was originally from Leuven. He may also have been a Kapellmeister (succentor) at the Church of Our Lady in Sint-Truiden.

== Works ==
Jan Belle was a composer as well as a music theorist.

In 1552, the publisher and editor Jacob Bathen, who lived in Maastricht, published Belle’s probable first work relating to music. This was the Musices encomion, a book on music theory. No copies of the book have been preserved.

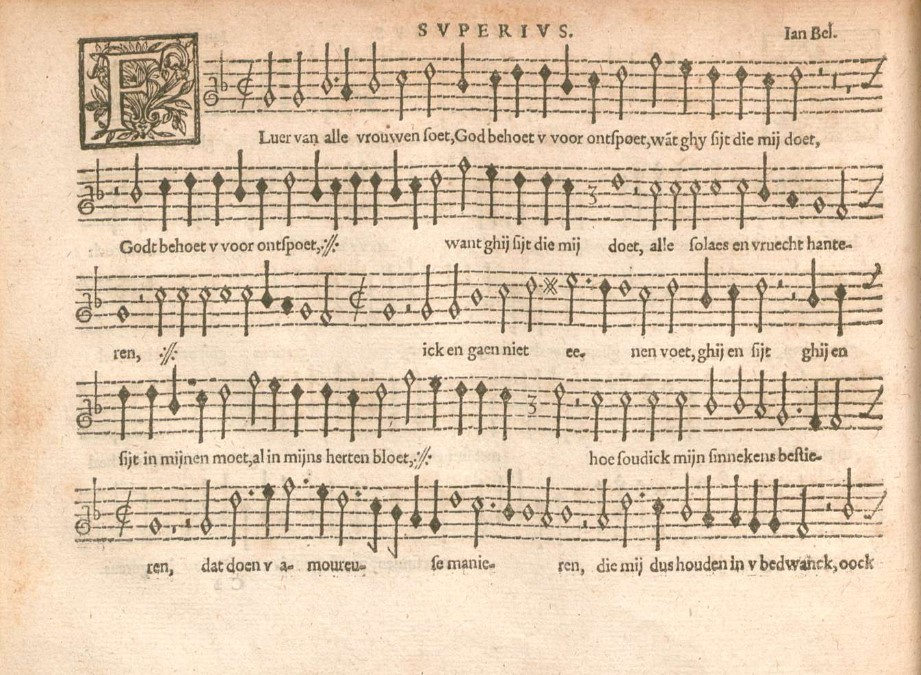
Belle's "Fluer van alle vrouwen soet" from Een Duytsch musyck boeck, 1572

In 1572, Petrus Phalesius the Elder in Leuven and Johannes Bellerus in Antwerp co-published under the title Een Duytsch musyck boeck an anthology of Dutch songs by various composers. The book contains six songs for four voices composed by Belle. These songs are:

1. "Fluer van alle vrouwen soet" (Flower of all sweet women)
2. "Ick en can mij niet bedwinghen" (I cannot control myself) (In a 1554 edition by Jacob Bathen, this song is credited to Joannes Zacheus)
3. "Int groen, int groen, met u alderliefste" (In the green, in the green, with you, my sweetest)
4. "Laet ons nu al verblijden in desen soeten tijt" (Let us already rejoice in this sweet time)
5. "O amoureusich mondeken root" (Oh enamored red mouth)
6. "O doloreux herte met druck beladich" (Oh aching heart weighed down with pressure)
