= Grażyna Pstrokońska-Nawratil =

Polish composer and music educator (born 1947)

Grażyna Pstrokońska-Nawratil (born 16 July 1947) is a Polish composer and music educator.

== Life ==
Grażyna Pstrokońska-Nawratil was born in Wrocław, Poland. She studied composition at the State School of Music in Wrocław with Stefan Bolesław Poradowski and Tadeusz Natanson, and in France under Pierre Boulez and Olivier Messiaen. She took courses at the Institut de Recherche et de Coordination Acoustique/Musique in Paris and studied Iannis Xenakis's music in Aix-en-Provence.

After completing her studies, Pstrokońska-Nawratil took a position in 1971 at the State School of Music in Wrocław, becoming a professor in 1993 and later Chair of Composition and Music Theory. Beginning in 1998, she also taught at the Poznan Academy of Music. Her works have been performed internationally.

== Honors and awards ==
- The Tadeusz Baird Young Competition of the Polish Composers' Union in 1968 and 1973
- Grzegorz Fitelberg Competition in 1972
- International Competition for Women Composers in Mannheim in 1975
- 3rd place at the UNESCO International Composers' Tribune in Paris in 1987
- Wrocław City Award
- Chairman of the Council of Ministers Award for work for children and teenagers in 1997
- Brother Albert Award in 1998

== Works ==
Selected works include:

- Trio-sonata for violin, cello and piano (1967)
- Concerto grosso for clarinet, horn, piano and orchestra (1970–71)
- Fresco I for symphony orchestra (1972)
- Po słońce czerwone voices and 5 instruments (1972)
- Nocturne for cello and prepared piano (1973)
- Alphabet for mixed choir and instrumental ensemble (1973)
- Three Songs for mixed choir (1973)
- Ostinato for percussion ensemble (1974)
- Fresco II - Epitaphios for symphony orchestra (1975)
- The canon of the motor group 4 drums and piano (1976)
- Studio for violino and tam-tam (1977)
- Ymnodia for 3 voices, percussion and tape (1977)
- Fresco III - Icarus for symphony orchestra (1979)'
- La vetrata for piano (1979)
- Incrustation for violin and orchestra (1979)
- Papież Słowiański, cantata for soprano, baritone, narrator, choir and orchestra (1979)
- Arabesque for string quartet (1980)
- Eco for 2 flutes (1980)
- Eco for flute (1980)
- Studio per una batteria (1981)
- The White Eagle Flew to Silesia, oratorio-ballad for 3 sopranos, chorus and orchestra (1981)
- Fresco IV - Concerto alla campana Baird in memoriam for piano and orchestra (1982)
- Bis-Joke for percussion and piano (1985)
- Pieśni niespokojne for baritone and orchestra (1985)
- Pejzaż z pluszczem for soprano and 3 violins (1986)
- Fresco V - éternel for soprano, boys' choir, mixed choir and symphony orchestra (1987)
- In the realm of autumn leaves, a ballet for children (1989)
- Le soleil, concert for percussion and orchestra (1991)
- Triangle! for percussion ensemble (1992)
- Le tambour provençal for 2 cellos and piano (1993)
- Fresco VI - Palindrome I, for string orchestra with harpsichord (1994)
- Lydian Quartet - thinking of Andrew for string quartet (1994)
- Palindrome II "Terra" for male choir and piano (1995)
- Bartok [version] for 2 cellos and piano (1995)
- El Condor (Spring), concerto for two marimbas and chamber orchestra (1996)
- La foret (Autumn) on bass and chamber orchestra (1997)
- ... il neige (Winter) for oboe and chamber orchestra (1997)
- ... como el sol e la March ... (Summer), for flute and chamber orchestra (1998)
- Eco Music "Klimop" for orchestra (1998)
- Fresco VII - Uru-Anna for tenor, mixed choir and large symphony orchestra (1998–99)
- Hectoriana (1999)
- In search of a wandering echo for two violins (2000)
- Bartok [version II] for marimba and chamber orchestra (2000)
- Algorithm dream of a big city for solo marimba (2001)
- Birds on the horizon, the twilight for viola and double bass (2002)
