= Joanne Metcalf =

American composer (born 1958)

- Born: 1958 (age 67–68)
- Occupation: Composer

Joanne Metcalf (born 1958) is an American composer of contemporary classical music. Best known for her choral music, she has worked closely with the Hilliard Ensemble and Singer Pur, among other vocal ensembles.

== Life and career ==
External videos
- It Is Enough performed by the Singer Pur
- It Is Enough

Joanne Metcalf was born in 1958 and studied music composition (BA, 1982) at the University of California, Santa Barbara. She was awarded first prize for the 1993 Search for New Music award from the International Alliance for Women in Music. While studying at Duke University with Stephen Jaffe and Scott Lindroth (MM, 1993), she met Dutch composer Louis Andriessen, then a guest at Duke. Inspired by "whatever it was that made [Andriessen's] music so fresh and energizing", Metcalf later studied with him for at the Royal Conservatory of The Hague through a Fulbright scholarship. She continued her studies at Duke (PhD, 1999), before teaching composition at Lawrence University in Appleton, Wisconsin from to 2001 to 2025.

== Music ==
Her Il nome del bel fior (1998), based on the vision of Mary in Canto XXIII of Dante‘s Paradiso, was composed for, and recorded by, the Hilliard Ensemble and Singer Pur.

== Recordings ==
Recordings of compositions by Joanne Metcalf
Year	Album	Featured work(s)	Performers	Label
1996	A Hilliard Songbook	Music for the Star of the Sea	Hilliard Ensemble	ECM Records 453 259-2
2004	Choral Works	Il nome del bel fior	Singer Pur	Oehms Classics OC354
2006	Das Hohelied der Liebe	Ego dilecto meo	Singer Pur	Oehms Classics OC803
2010	Carmina Celtica	Shining Light	Canty	Linn Records CKD378
2015	Mary Star of the Sea	Music for The Star of the Sea; Il nome del bel fior (Parts IV–V)	Gothic Voices	Linn Records CKD541
2017	The Best of Singer Pur	Il nome del bel fior	Singer Pur	Oehms Classics OC1869
2018	Lilith	Darkening of the Light	Lilith	National Sawdust Tracks
2019	Horizons	It Is Enough	Singer Pur	Oehms Classics OC1714
2021	Among Whirlwinds	Among Dark Whirlwinds; Gold and Thorns, Fire and Ice	Singer Pur	Oehms Classics OC1723
2022	New Suns	The Sea's Wash in the Hollow of the Heart	Variant 6	Open G Records 195269 164461
2024	Dreamspace	The Undreaming	Michael Mizrahi	Sono Luminus DSL-92276
