= Joannes Zacheus =

16th-century Franco-Flemish composer

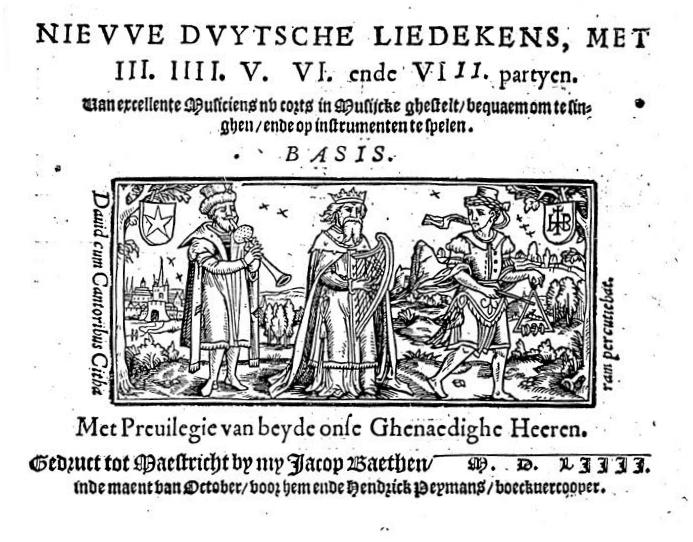
Title page of Dat ierste boeck vanden nieuwe Duijtsche liedekens, published by Jacob Bathen in Maastricht in 1554

Joannes Zacheus (fl. 1554/1569) was a composer of the Franco-Flemish School.

Not much is still known about Zacheus. When the publisher and editor Jacob Bathen published an anthology of Dutch songs titled Dat ierste boeck vanden nieuwe Duijtsche liedekens, he included two songs for four voices by Zacheus:

- Ic en can mij niet bedwinghen (in a Leuven edition dating from 1572 by Petrus Phalesius the Elder, Ick en can mij niet bedwinghen is credited to Jan Belle).
- Miins liefkens bruijn ooghen (is thought to be an adaptation of the setting of this song by Carolus Souliaert).
