= List of LGBTQ classical composers =

Numerous composers of Western classical music from the 16th century to the modern day were or are lesbian, gay, bisexual, transgender or queer. Many of these composers faced persecution or violence as a result of their sexuality.

== 16th century ==
Name	Born	Died	Nationality	Details	Ref(s)
Dominique Phinot	c. 1510	c. 1556	Franco-Flemish	Phinot was a composer of motets with polyphonic experimentation that predated the music of Palestrina. He was tried and executed by the French government for "homosexual practices", likely in the city of Lyon.	

== 17th century ==
Name	Born	Died	Nationality	Details	Ref(s)
Charles Coypeau d'Assoucy	1605	1677	French	d'Assoucy is believed to have been the lover of the French novelist Cyrano de Bergerac. He was arrested multiple times by the Holy Office for unspecified reasons.	
Jean-Baptiste Lully	1632	1687	Italian-French	Lully was a composer of Baroque music employed in the court of then-king Louis XIV. He was discovered to have had sexual affairs with both men and women, and was subsequently expelled from the courtship at the orders of the king.	
Johann Rosenmüller	1619	1684	German	Rosenmüller was a German composer who fled to Italy in 1658, after a scandal involving his homosexual activities with choirboys came to light.	

== 18th century ==
Name	Born	Died	Nationality	Details	Ref(s)
Frederick the Great	1712	1786	Prussian	Frederick the Great is best known as the first King of Prussia, and had several musical works published during his lifetime. His homosexuality and numerous documented partners have been confirmed by modern historians.	

== 19th century ==
Name	Born	Died	Nationality	Details	Ref(s)
Clement Harris	1871	1897	English		
Adela Maddison	1862	1929	English		
Ella Overbeck	1870	1919	Russo-English		
Camille Saint-Saëns	1835	1921	French		
Ethel Smyth	1858	1944	English		
Pyotr Ilyich Tchaikovsky	1840	1893	Russian		
Siegfried Wagner	1869	1930	German		

== 20th century ==
Name	Born	Died	Nationality	Details	Ref(s)
Walter Arlen	1920	2023	Austro-American		
Miguel del Aguila	1957		Uruguayan-American		
Ruth Anderson	1928	2019	American		
Samuel Barber	1910	1981	American		
Jean Barraqué	1928	1973	French		
Stanley Bate	1911	1959	English		
Arthur Benjamin	1893	1960	Australian		
R. R. Bennett	1936	2012	Anglo-American		
Lord Berners	1883	1950	English		
Leonard Bernstein	1918	1990	American		
Marc Blitzstein	1905	1964	American		
Konrad Boehmer	1941	2014	German-Dutch		
Henriëtte Bosmans	1895	1952	Dutch		
Pierre Boulez	1925	2016	French		
Paul Bowles	1910	1999	Moroccan		
Benjamin Britten	1913	1976	English		
Merton Brown	1913	2001	American		
Sylvano Bussotti	1931	2021	Italian		
John Cage	1912	1992	American		
Wendy Carlos	1931		American		
Roger Sacheverell Coke	1912	1971	English		
Aaron Copland	1900	1990	American		
John Corigliano	1938		American	Married to Mark Adamo	
Henry Cowell	1897	1965	American		
Ingolf Dahl	1912	1970	German-American		
Peter Maxwell Davies	1934	2016	English		
David Del Tredici	1937		American		
David Diamond	1915	2005	American		
Hubert du Plessis	1922	2011	South African		
Julius Eastman	1940	1990	American		
Joseph Fennimore	1940		American		
William Flanagan	1923	1969	American		
Wolfgang Fortner	1907	1987	German		
Karel Goeyvaerts	1923	1993	Belgian		
Charles Tomlinson Griffes	1884	1920	American		
Clare Grundman	1913	1996	American		
Reynaldo Hahn	1874	1947	Venezuelan-French		
Lou Harrison	1917	2003	American		
Hans Werner Henze	1926	2012	German		
David Hogan	1949	1996	American		
Lee Hoiby	1926	2011	American		
Vladimir Horowitz	1903	1989	Russian		
Jerry Hunt	1943	1993	American		
Douglas Lilburn	1915	2001	New Zealander		
Annea Lockwood	1939		New Zealander		
Frederick May	1911	1985	Irish		
Colin McPhee	1900	1964	Canadian-American		
Gian Carlo Menotti	1911	2007	Italian-American		
Noel Mewton-Wood	1922	1953	Australian-English		
Zygmunt Mycielski	1907	1997	Polish		
Dimitri Mitropoulos	1896	1960	Greek		
Pauline Oliveros	1932	2016	American		
Harry Partch	1901	1974	American		
Thomas Pasatieri	1941		American		
Daniel Pinkham	1923	2006	American		
Francis Poulenc	1899	1963	French		
Roger Quilter	1877	1953	English		
Peer Raben	1940	2007	German		
Aribert Reimann	1936	2024	German		
Ned Rorem	1923	2022	American		
Henri Sauguet	1901	1989	French		
Kaikhosru Shapurji Sorabji	1892	1988	English		
Conrad Susa	1935	2013	American		
Karol Szymanowski	1882	1937	Polish		
Virgil Thomson	1896	1989	American		
Michael Tippett	1905	1998	English		
Tui St. George Tucker	1924	2004	American		
Claude Vivier	1948	1983	Canadian		
Ben Weber	1916	1979	American		
Juliusz Wertheim	1880	1928	Polish		
Arnold van Wyk	1916	1983	South African		
Charles Wuorinen	1938	2020	American		

== 21st century ==
Name	Born	Died	Nationality	Details	Ref(s)
Mark Adamo	1962		American	Married to John Corigliano	
Miguel del Aguila	1957		American		
Thomas Adès	1971		English		
Matthew Aucoin	1990		American		
William Basinski	1958		American		
Eve Beglarian	1958		American		
Iain Bell	1980		English		
Chester Biscardi	1948		American		
Roger Bourland	1952		American		
Mark Carlson	1952		American		
David Conte	1955		American		
Conrad Cummings	1948		American		
Corey Dargel	1977		American		
Jeremy Dutcher	1990		Canadian		
Mohammed Fairouz	1985		American		
Gareth Farr	1968		New Zealander		
Michael Finnissy	1946		English		
Alan Fletcher	1956		American		
Jake Heggie	1961		American		
Jennifer Higdon	1962		American		
Stephen Hough	1961		Anglo-Australian		
Laura Karpman	1959		American		
Lowell Liebermann	1961		American		
Jonathan Mills	1963		Australian		
Meredith Monk	1942		American		
Nico Muhly	1981		American		
Andrew Norman	1979		American		
Patrick Nunn	1969		British		
Thomas Pasatieri	1941		American		
Albert Patron	1969		Italian		
Tobias Picker	1954		American		
Matthew Ricketts	1986		Canadian		
Gil Shohat	1973		Israeli		
Michael Tilson Thomas	1944	2026	American		
Philip Venables	1979		English		
Šimon Voseček	1978		Austro-Czech		
Rufus Wainwright	1973		American-Canadian		
