= Carolus Souliaert =

Dutch composer

Carolus Souliaert (died 1540?) (also known as: Swillaert, Swillart, Swilliart) was a Dutch composer active in the first half of the 16th century.

Very little is known about the life of this composer. A few chansons composed by Souliaert/ Swillaert to texts in Dutch were published by Tielman Susato in his collections of Dutch chansons.

In Het Ierste musyck Boexken, the first collection printed in 1551, there is one chanson by Carolus Swillart or Swilliart (different spellings in different part books): Myn liefkens bruyn ooghen. In the second collection Het twueeste musyck boexken (also printed in 1551), there are five chansons by Carolus Souliaert: Een costerken op syn, Het soude een knecktken, Ick ghinck gisteravent, Ick truere/ Druck en verdriet and Wilt doch met maten. Susato also published one motet by Souliaert in the collection Liber secundus ecclesiasticarum (published in 1553).

There are also a few sacral compositions by Souliaert preserved in manuscript.

== Sources ==
- Eugeen Scheurs; introduction to the facsimile prints of Tielman Susato: Het Ierste Musyck Boexken (1987 Peer) and Het tvueetste musyck boexken (1987 Peer).
