= Theodor Evertz =

Franco-Flemish composer (fl. c. 1554)

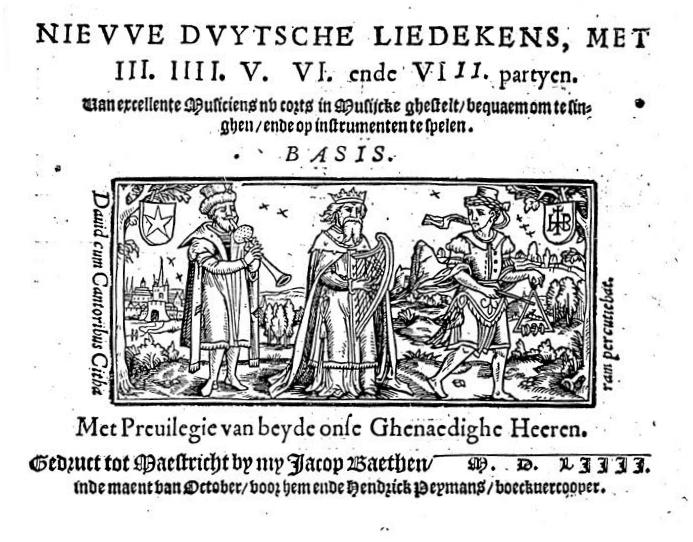
Title page of Dat ierste boeck vanden nieuwe Duijtsche liedekens, published by Jacob Bathen in Maastricht in 1554

Theodor Evertz (fl. c. 1554) was a Franco-Flemish composer from the Renaissance.

== Life and work ==
Little is known about Evertz.

Three of his Dutch songs are preserved in the anthology of Dutch songs, Dat ierste boeck vanden nieuwe Duijtsche liedekens, published by Jacob Bathen in Maastricht in 1554:

- O Venus jent aensiet toch mijn torment (O Venus, tormentor, have pity on me)
- Ontwaect van slaep nu wij ghij sijt (Awake, who ever you are)
- Schoen lief ic mach wel claeghen (My beloved, it cries to heaven)

No complete set of parts of Jacob Bathen's anthology has yet been retrieved (the soprano voice is missing), but one of the songs for four voices has been published in Petrus Phalesius's Een Duijtsch musijck boeck in 1572, of which at least one complete copy has survived.

== Sources ==
- The New Grove Dictionary of Music and Musicians, London, 2001
- Jan Willem Bonda, De meerstemmige Nederlandse liederen van de vijftiende en zestiende eeuw. Hilversum, Verloren, 1996. ISBN 90-6550-545-8
