= Józef Śliwiński =

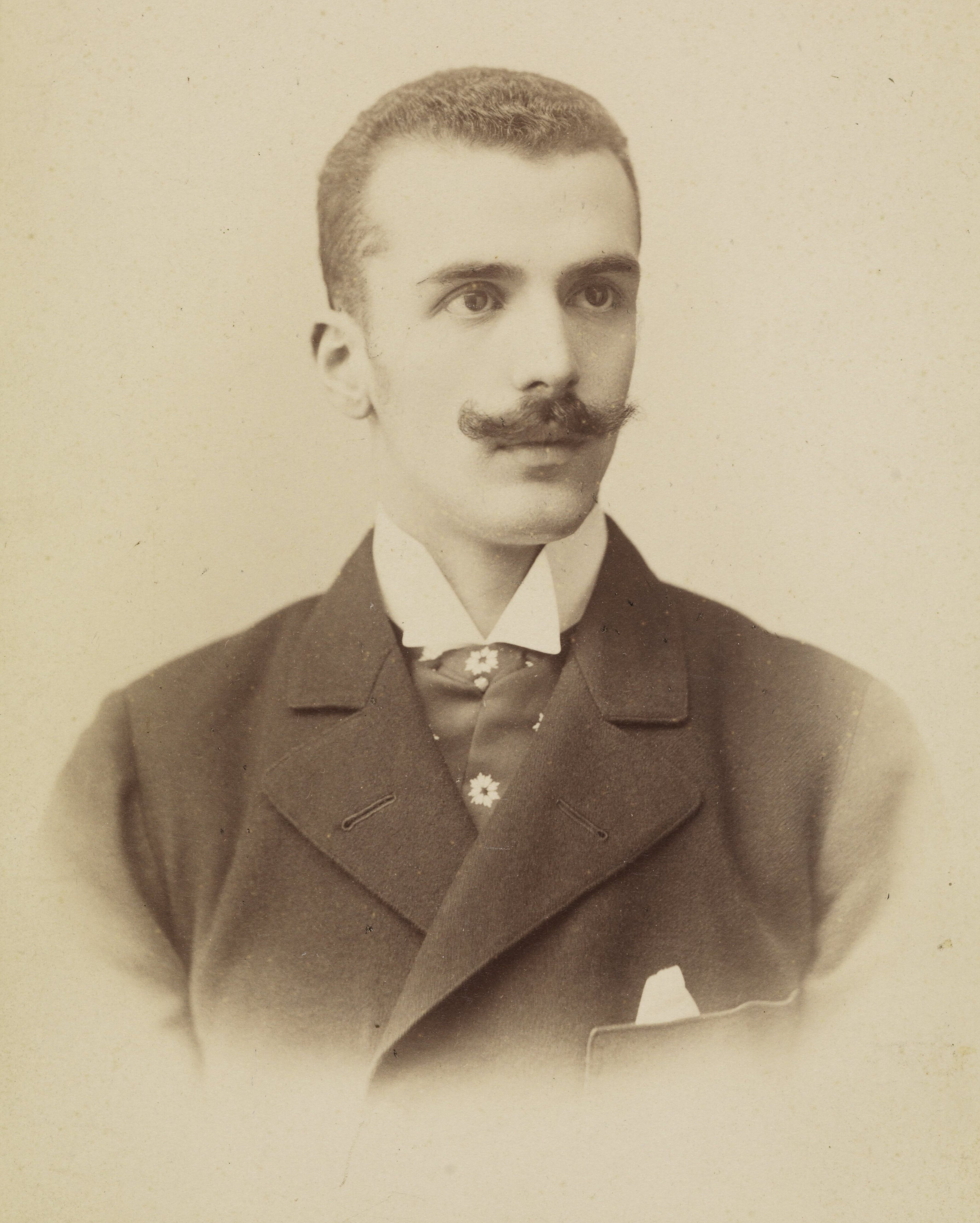
Józef Śliwiński, 1895

Józef Śliwiński (15 December 1865, in Warsaw – 1930) was a Polish classical pianist, one of the outstanding interpreters of the poetic and romantic repertoire, especially Chopin and Schumann. He was taught by Theodor Leschetizky and Anton Rubinstein. For many years he was professor of piano at the Riga Conservatory. He lived in Warsaw from 1918.

A man of aristocratic bearing, Śliwiński studied with Leschetizky in Vienna for four years before going on to have lessons from Rubinstein in St. Petersburg. He taught in Russia for some time at the Saratov Conservatory, and toured around 1900 with some success. He was a famous proponent of the weight technique, by which the weight of the arm in the depression of the keys was supposed to produce a more powerful resonance in the note, and indeed he had a deep and affecting tone. He played with great emotional power and expressiveness, and was at his best in the larger-scale works of Chopin and Schumann, though without exploiting the heroic side of Chopin's writing. He also established himself as a conductor. His technique became unreliable in later years, but he was greatly admired as a poet of the keyboard.

Among his pupils were Juliusz Wertheim, Stanislas Niedzielski and Julian Clifford.
