= Stanislas Niedzielski =

Polish pianist

Stanislas Niedzielski (1905–1975) was a Polish pianist, noted for his playing of Chopin. His given name is also seen as Stanislaw or Stanislaus.

== Early life ==
He was born in Warsaw, Poland in 1905 and studied with Józef Śliwiński and Henryk Opieński in Poland, and with Ignacy Jan Paderewski in Switzerland. He gave his first concert in London in 1925. He played Cyril Scott's Piano Concerto No. 1 in March 1928, with the Bournemouth Symphony Orchestra under Sir Dan Godfrey (the source refers to him as a "teenager", but he appears to have been about 23).

== Career ==
On 18 January 1930, in Madrid, he gave the first performance of Joaquín Turina's Contes d'Espagne, Set II, Op. 47.

He toured to many countries, including frequent performances in South Africa, Mauritius, Australia and New Zealand.

For a performance at Birmingham Town Hall around 1950 he brought his own piano in a box trailer towed behind his car.

Niedzielski is not well known today, but he had a commanding technique as shown in his own paraphrase on Johann Strauss II's A Thousand and One Nights Waltz, Op. 346, recorded in London in 1930.

His recordings are now rare (some have been reissued on CD in recent years):

- Chopin: Ballade, Scherzo, Polonaise, Impromptu, Mazurkas
- Chopin: Sonata No. 2 in B flat minor; nine études
- Chopin: Mazurkas (selection; 1931)
- Liszt: Liebestraum No. 2
- Mozart: Piano Sonata No. 11 in A
- Ludomir Różycki: Légende
- Schumann: Symphonic Studies, Op. 13
- Johann Strauss II arr. Niedzielski: A Thousand and One Nights, Op. 346
- pieces by Claude Debussy, Federico Mompou and others.

== Personal life ==
He settled in Paris, dying there in 1975 of a tropical disease contracted during an African tour.
