= Ludovicus Episcopius =

Flemish Roman Catholic priest and composer

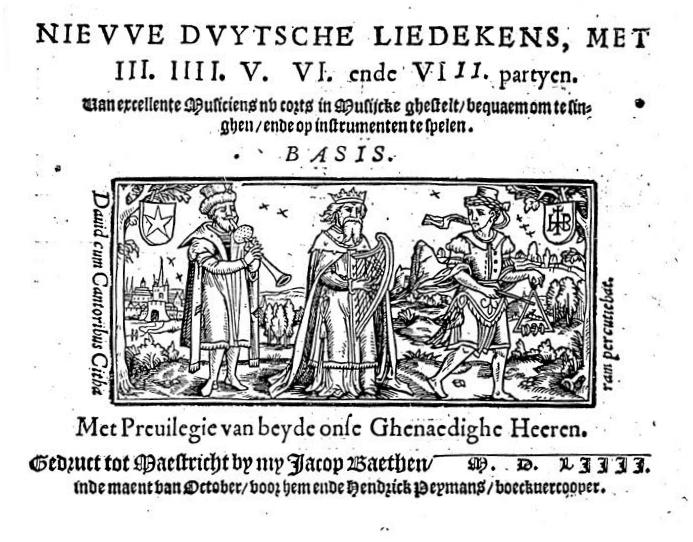
Title page of Dat ierste boeck vanden nieuwe Duijtsche liedekens, published in 1554 by Jacob Bathen

Lodewijk de Bisschop, Latinised as Ludovicus Episcopius (c. 1520 in Mechelen – 29 April 1595 in Straubing) was a Flemish Roman Catholic priest and composer of the late Renaissance and one of the first to compose secular songs in the Dutch language.

== Life ==
Episcopius was born in Mechelen around 1520 as the son of Antonius de Bisschop. His father was the sexton and singer of the Onze-Lieve-Vrouw-over-de-Dijle church in Mechelen. His received his musical training at the St. Rumbolds Cathedral in Mechelen. The choirmaster of the cathedral was Theo Verelst, who was also the teacher of Philippus de Monte and Cypriano de Rore.

Episcopius studied from 1538 to 1541 at the University of Leuven and became a priest. From 1545 to 1565 and from 1577 to 1585, he was choirmaster at the Basilica of Saint Servatius in Maastricht. He was replaced by Jean de Chaynée. When his successor de Chaynée was assassinated, Episcopius was reinstated in his former position.

Around 1582, he moved from the Low Countries to Munich where in 1584 he became a singer in the choir that was led by Orlando di Lasso. He retired in 1591 and became a canon in Straubing.

== Work ==
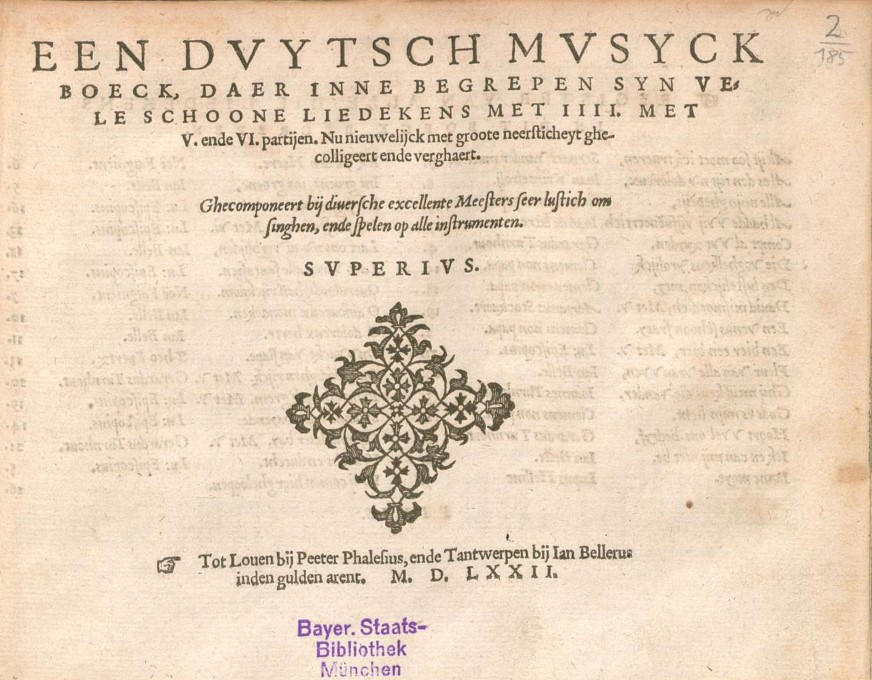
Title page of Een Duytsch musyck boeck published by Phalesius and Bellerus in 1572

Only a few of Episcopius' works survive. These include the Missa super 'si mon service a merite' , four motets, a Salve regina and 12 Dutch language songs.

The Dutch language songs are mainly contained in two anthologies published in the 16th century: Dat ierste boeck vanden nieuwe Duijtsche liedekens, published in 1554 in Maastricht by Jacob Bathen and Een Duytsch musyck boeck, jointly published in 1572 by Petrus Phalesius the Elder in Leuven and Johannes Bellerus in Antwerp. Some songs have been preserved in manuscript. Of the 8 songs from Bathen's edition, of which no complete copy has survived, some were reedited by Phalesius and Bellerus in their anthology (of which a complete copy survives), which contains, among works by other composers, 7 songs by Episcopius, the highest number of his works in any publication.

The Dutch language songs are:

1. Een bier een bierenbroyken (A beer, a pap of beer)
2. Ghequetst ben ic van binnen (I feel hurt inside)
3. Ick seg adieu, wij twee wij moeten scheiden (I say farewell, the two of us, we must part)
4. Ick zou studeren in eenen hoeck (I would study in a corner)
5. Ic zou studeren in eenen hoeck (I would study in a corner, published by Phalesius, a revised version of the previous composition)
6. Laet varen alle fantasie (Abandon all imagination)
7. Princersselijck grein, die ic ghern aenschouwe (Princess, whom I like to watch)
8. Princersselijck grein, die ic gern aenschouwe (Princess, whom I like to watch, a version of the previous composition likely revised by Ludovicus Episcopius himself for the #Een Duytsch musyck boeck)
9. Susanna haer baeiende in een fontein (Susanna bathed in a fountain, after Susanne un jour from composer Didier Lupi Second)
10. Vruecht en deucht mijn hert verhuecht (my heart enjoys in pleasure and virtue)
