= Juliusz Wertheim =

Polish musician

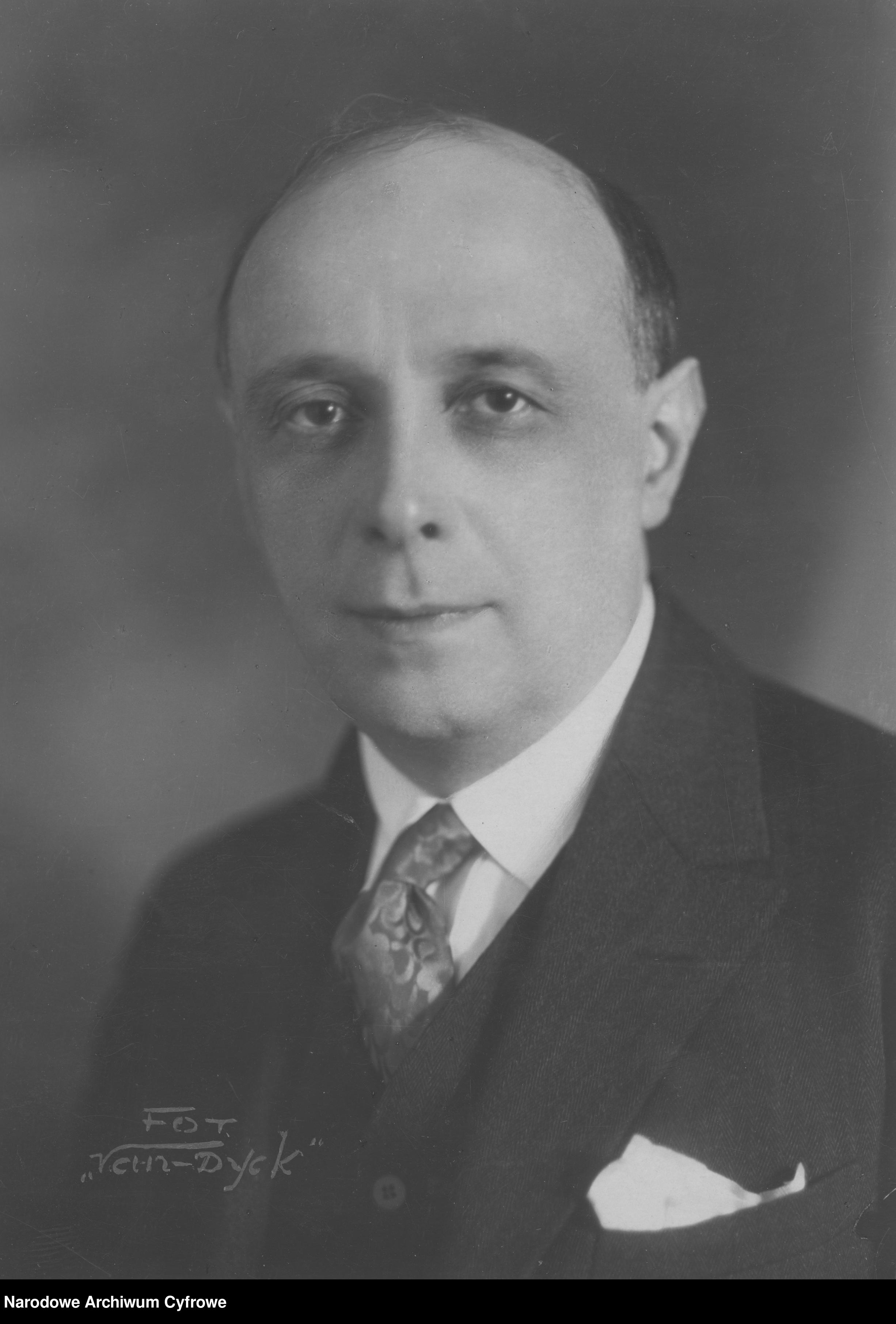
Wertheim in 1920.

Juliusz Edward Wertheim (24 September 1880 – 6 May 1928), sometimes known as Julius or Jules Wertheim, was a Polish pianist, conductor and composer, a member of a prominent family, who had a significant influence on the career of Arthur Rubinstein.

== Origins, training, career ==
Juliusz was born into a prominent Warsaw family of Jewish origin which had converted to Lutheranism. The father of Juliusz, Piotr or Pierre Wertheim (1850-1922), was a stepbrother of Carl Tausig and, like his father Julian Jakub Wertheim (1817−1901), a successful banker in Warsaw. The mother, Aleksandra Klementyna, was the daughter of Ferdinand Leo, editor of the Gazeta Polska, and she was a singer of some accomplishment. In 1893 Juliusz began to take piano lessons from Rudolf Strobl, who sent him to Berlin to study composition with Heinrich Urban, and piano with Moritz Moszkowski and Karl Heinrich Barth (with whom Rubinstein later studied). Juliusz then returned to the Warsaw Conservatory to study theory under Zygmunt Noskowski, and graduated with a gold medal in 1901. He also received piano instruction from Józef Śliwiński. From 1915 - 1916, he was assistant conductor of the Warsaw Philharmonic. For some years he became professor of instrumentation at the Warsaw Conservatory, and later lived independently as a composer in Berlin. By 1924 he had written and published 4 symphonies, many piano works including sonatas and variations, and many songs (N. Simrock).

== Association with Arthur Rubinstein ==
The Wertheims maintained an important salon in Warsaw, and the young Arthur Rubinstein became drawn into it during the first decade of the 20th century, as were Josef Hofmann and Paweł Kochański. Rubinstein made numerous sexual conquests among women who had initially set their sights on the homosexual (and thus unattainable) Wertheim. Rubinstein was drawn into the individual lives of the Wertheim family, and described these complicated relationships in his earlier autobiography, My Young Years, using the pseudonyms 'Paul and Magdalena Harman' for Piotr and Aleksandra Wertheim.

Rubinstein was deeply influenced by Wertheim's approach to the playing of Chopin's music, and stated later that he had largely drawn his own inspiration for playing Chopin from Wertheim's 'deep and intuitive understanding of his genius.' Considering the importance of Chopin's music in Rubinstein's career, and of Rubinstein in the modern understanding of Chopin, that is a very large tribute. He performed Wertheim's Fantasy and Brahms's First Piano Concerto, Wertheim himself conducting the Warsaw Philharmonic Orchestra, in February 1904. Despite his musical understanding, Wertheim possessed a flawed and unreliable piano technique (as Zbigniew Drzewiecki, among others, observed): however he was able to encourage several young pianists, including Roman Jasiński, Bolesław Kon and Aleksander Kagan.

Juliusz Wertheim died of a heart attack while conducting Wagner's Meistersinger Prelude with the Warsaw Philharmonic Orchestra in a broadcast concert, on 6 May 1928. He is buried at the Lutheran cemetery in Warsaw in the family tomb.

== Discography ==
- 2018 : Piano Works - Acte Préalable AP0428 - Elżbieta Tyszecka, piano

== See also ==
- List of LGBT classical composers

== Sources ==
- Arthur Eaglefield Hull, A Dictionary of Modern Music and Musicians (Dent, London 1924).
- J. Methuen-Campbell, Chopin Playing from the Composer to the Present Day (Gollancz, London 1981).
- Harvey Sachs, Arthur Rubinstein - A Life (Phoenix Paperback, London 1997), 57-66.
- A. Rubinstein, My Young Years (Jonathan Cape, London 1973).
