= Martin Peudargent =

- Born: 1510; Huy
- Died: 1570s
- Occupation: Composer

Martin Peudargent (or Peu d'argent, also Martin von Huy; Huy, c. 1510-1570s) was a Flemish composer and chapel master of William, Duke of Jülich-Cleves-Berg in Düsseldorf.

Mainly motets survive from Peudargents hand. His motetcollection from 1555 is known as the first music to ever be printed in Düsseldorf. Peudargents musical style is typical for the Flemish school and closely resembles that of composers such as Clemens non Papa, even though Peudargent sticks less to Gregorian modes and strives towards a stronger textual expression.

== Works (selection) ==
- Sacrarum Cantionum I, 12 motets for 5 voices, J. Bathen, Düsseldorf 1555
- Sacrarum Cantionum II, 14 motets, of which 1 for 6 voices and 13 for 5 voices, J. Bathen, Düsseldorf 1555
- Novi prorsus et elegantis libri musici, in quo continentur partim suavissima ... Moteta ... latinae & gallicae 4-, 5-, 6-voiced Motets, Oridryus & Buysius, Düsseldorf 1561. Aside of works by Peudargent also music by Josquin Baston, Pierre de Manchicourt, Jean de Latre and Clemens non Papa. This publication has disappeared during the Second World War.
- Misit me vivens pater 4 voices, Irrogat omnipotens 6 voices in: Sacrarum Cantionum diversorum autorum III, J. Bathen, Düsseldorf 1556
- Te Deum Patrem, 4 voices, in: Ecclesiasticarum cantionum quatuor vocum II, Susato Antwerpen 1553
