= Henryk Opieński =

Polish composer, violinist and musicologist (1870 - 1942)

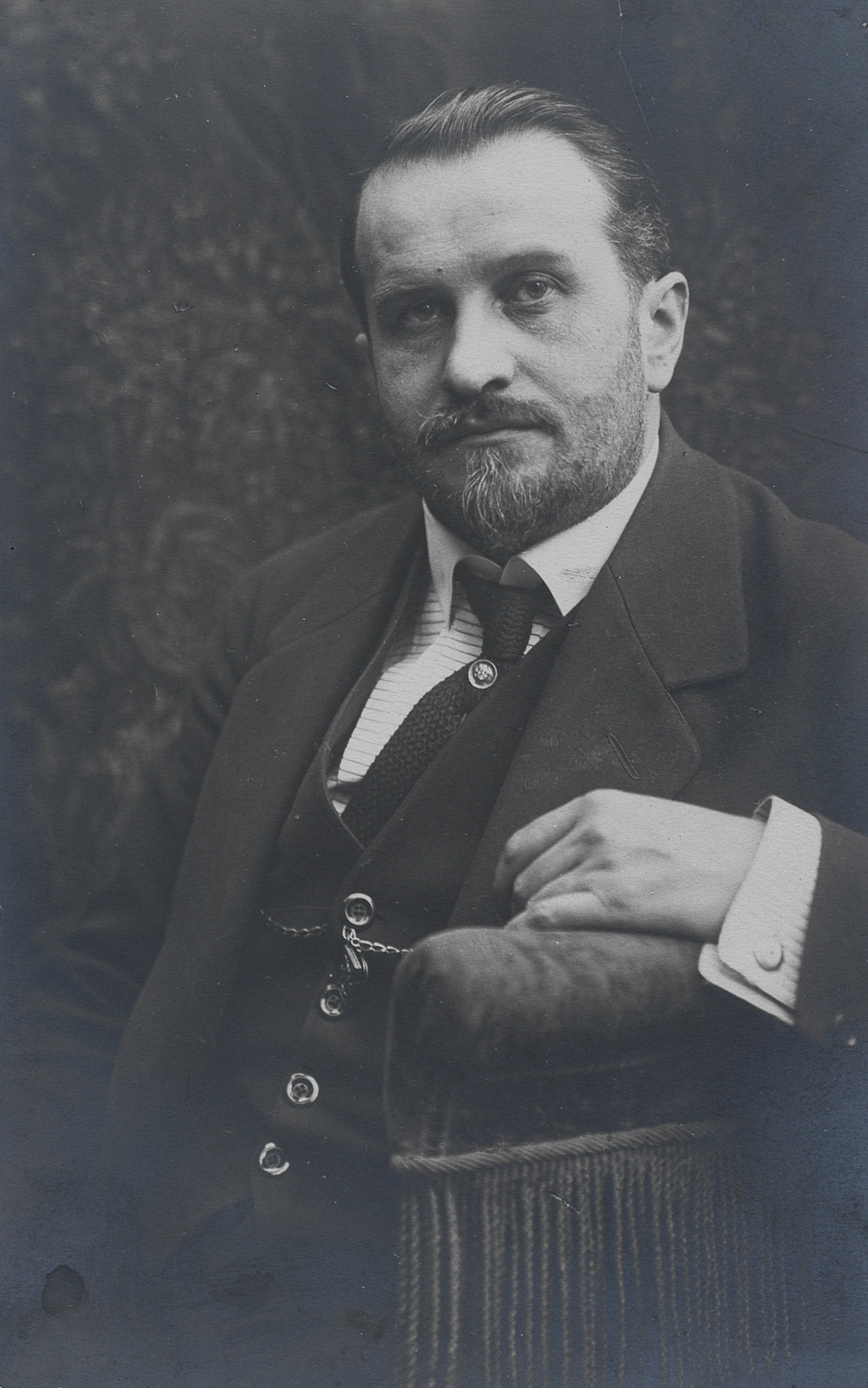
Henryk Opieński in 1915

Henryk Opieński (13 January 1870 – 21 January 1942) was a Polish composer, violinist, teacher, administrator and musicologist. His writings on, and collected letters by, Frédéric Chopin, were considered of paramount importance in Chopin studies of the time.

== Biography ==
Opieński was born in Kraków in 1870, and he commenced his study of the violin with Vincent Singer there. When aged 12 in 1882, he participated in a juvenile prank with three other boys Stanisław Wyspiański, Józef Mehoffer, Stanisław Estreicher by tolling the Sigismund Bell.

Between 1888 and 1892 he studied chemistry at university in Prague to please his parents, while continuing his violin studies with Ferdinand Lachner. From 1892 to 1894 he returned to Kraków and worked in the chemical industry, being appointed controller of distilleries at Żółkiew and Rzeszów. He then resumed his study of composition with Władysław Żeleński.

In 1895 he went to Paris, where he had further violin studies with Wladyslaw Gorski, and further composition studies with Zygmunt Stojowski and Ignacy Jan Paderewski, who became a close lifelong friend. In 1897 and 1898 he had composition studies with Heinrich Urban in Berlin, while working as a violinist. In 1898 he returned to Paris to study with Vincent d'Indy at the Schola Cantorum de Paris. He also played violin with the orchestra of Édouard Colonne 1899–1901.

Back in Poland from 1901, he continued his life as a violinist and also founded the choir of the Warsaw Philharmonic Orchestra.

From 1904 to 1906 he worked with Arthur Nikisch (conducting) and Hugo Riemann (musicology) in Leipzig. In 1906 he made his debut as an operatic conductor at the Municipal Theatre in Lviv.

From 1908 to 1911 Henryk Opieński worked as a conductor in a theatre orchestra in Warsaw and was assistant conductor to Grzegorz Fitelberg at the Warsaw Philharmonic. From 1909, he taught at the Warsaw Musical Society. In January 1910, to mark the centenary year of the birth of Frédéric Chopin, he conducted the Polish premiere of Paderewski's Symphony in B minor "Polonia" (1908).

In 1911 he founded the first Polish magazine devoted to musicology, Musical Quarterly (Kwartalnik musyczny), editing it until 1914. He was also editor of Echo muzyczne. In 1913–14 he was musical director of the newly opened Polish Theatre in Warsaw.

In 1914 he graduated as a Doctor of Music from the University of Leipzig, with a dissertation on the Hungarian lutenist Bálint Bakfark.

Opieński lived in Switzerland during World War I. In 1917 he founded a mixed choir in Lausanne, called "Motet et Madrigal", specializing in performances of the works of composers of the sixteenth and seventeenth centuries.

After returning to Poland, Opieński directed the National Conservatory of Music in Poznań 1920–26, while continuing in numerous administrative roles in other music organisations. His students there included Stanislas Niedzielski and Stefan Bolesław Poradowski.

He moved permanently to Morges, Switzerland in 1926 when he married his second wife, Lydia Barblan, later known as Lydia Barblan-Opieńska (1890–1983), a singing teacher and composer of a cantata, piano pieces, choral works and songs. He resumed directing "Motet et Madrigal", and led them on tours of Switzerland, France, Austria, the Netherlands, Czechoslovakia, Germany and his native Poland. He was invited to join the jury of the 1927 International Chopin Piano Competition but was unable to accept.

His collected letters of Chopin, edited and translated by E. L. Voynich, were published in 1931.

From 1932 to 1936 he served as president of the Société de Musique Vaudois in Lausanne.

Henryk Opieński died in Morges in 1942, aged 72. Allée Henryk Opieński in Morges was later named in his honour.

== Compositions ==
Opieński's compositions are little-known now. They include:

=== Opera ===
- Daniel, unfinished and unpublished
- Maria, 3 acts (Poznań, 27 April 1923)
- Jacob the Lutenist, 2 acts and an epilogue (Poznan, 21 December 1927)

=== Orchestra ===
- Lilla Weneda, Op. 12, symphonic poem (1908)
- Zygmunt August and Barbara, Op. 13, symphonic poem (1911; also called Love and Destiny)
- Meditations on a Kashubian Theme, symphonic poem (1920)

=== Instrumental ===
- Berceuse, Op. 1, violin and piano
- Krakowiak, Op. 7, violin and piano
- Scènes lyriques en forme de quatuor, Op. 10, string quartet
- Theme Varié, Op. 11, piano (1906)

=== Voice and piano ===
- Sechs Lieder, Op. 8
- Three Songs
- Trois melodies, Op. 9
- Song of the May
- Seven Preludes, Op. 4
- Sometimes (Czasem)
- 30 Polish folk songs (2 albums)
- Les larmes, Op 5, 6 songs
- Printemps triste
- Prélude

=== Choral ===
- La Fuite de l'Hiver, four male voices a cappella
- The eternal spring, mixed choir a cappella
- Six national songs, mixed choir a cappella
- Six national songs, mixed choir a cappella
- Four songs, male choir a cappella
- Dance the night mists, choir and orchestra
- Cantata in honor of Mickiewicz, choir and orchestra (1908)
- Veni Creator, cantata for chorus and orchestra (1927)
- L'enfant prodigue, solo voices, chorus and orchestra (1930)

== Writings ==
- Jacob polonais et Jacobus Reys (1909)
- Chopin (1910)
- Paderewski (1910)
- Chopin's Works (1911)
- Chopin as Creator (1912)
- Outlines of the History of Music (1912)
- La Musique polonaise (1918)
- Moniuszko (1924)
- Collected letters of Chopin, 1932 (ed. and trans. E. L. Voynich)
- I. J. Paderewski: Esquisse de sa vie et de son oeuvre (with Gabriel Hanotaux, Gustave Doret and Alfred Cortot)
