= Dominique Phinot =

Franco-Flemish composer

Dominique Phinot (c. 1510 – c. 1556) was a Franco-Flemish composer of the Renaissance, active in Italy and southern France. He was highly regarded at the time for his motets, which anticipate the style of Palestrina, and in addition he was an early pioneer of polychoral writing.

== Life ==
He may have been French in origin, since Girolamo Cardano, writing about him in his Theonoston (1560) called him "Gallus", and French was evidently his native language. Few details of his life are known with certainty, but some inferences can be made. Much of his career he spent in Italy, and he worked at both the court and cathedral in Urbino in 1544 and 1545. Some of his life he also probably spent in Lyon, as evidenced by several publications there, the music of which contains items of local interest; in addition the dedications are to citizens of Lyon. While stylistically some of his music seems likely to have been connected with Venice, there is no evidence of his activity there; however he published two books of psalm settings in Venice in 1554.

According to Cardano he was executed for "homosexual practices", probably in Lyon in 1556. Cardano relates that 'Jacob Bonfadius, a man otherwise not in the last place among the erudite, because of copulation with boys (a most vile and sordid thing), was beheaded in prison and publicly burned ... the French Dominique Phinot, a distinguished musician, was also killed in the same way for a very similar folly'.

== Music ==
Phinot's music was widely distributed, and he was highly praised by writers of the time, including Heinrich Finck and Pietro Cerone. Cerone called Phinot "one of the first and best composers of the time" and also said "had there been no Phinot, ... Palestrina's music would not have been possible." Heinrich Finck ranked him with Crecquillon, Clemens non Papa and Gombert, three contemporary composers who wrote similar music; indeed Phinot's style strongly resembles Gombert's. Likewise, Cardano singles him out for praise as 'among the most distinguished, excellent, and subtle composers.

More motets by Phinot survive than any other type of composition. A total of 2 masses, 4 magnificats, 2 madrigals, more than 60 chansons and approximately 90 motets have been attributed to him. Most of the motets are for five voices, and like those of Gombert, use pervasive imitation with all the voices being equal; there are few rests, so there is little contrast between groups of high and groups of low voices, or groups of few versus groups of many voices, contrasts which were popular with composers of the previous generation (for example Josquin).

Phinot seems to have been most highly regarded by the next generation of composers, including Palestrina and Lassus who both admired his music, for his polychoral works. The polychoral motets, including a setting of the Lamentations of Jeremiah, foreshadow the work of Willaert and the Venetian school. The Lamentations are for eight voices in two groups of four, who answer each other antiphonally and then gradually build to a climax as the groups increasingly overlap, eventually singing together in eight independent contrapuntal parts. These polychoral motets are considered by some scholars to be the earliest examples of mature polychoral writing (for example, A. F. Carver). They were reprinted time and again during the 16th century, indicating their popularity and influence.

Phinot's chansons use most of the techniques current at the time, and contain a variety of textures and approaches to setting text. Subjects range from satirical attacks on clerical abuses to love songs, some in the manner of Catullus and Ovid. They were published in two separate collections in Lyon in 1548.

== See also ==
- List of LGBT classical composers
- List of people executed for homosexuality
- List of Renaissance composers
