= Petrus Phalesius the Elder =

Flemish bookseller, printer and publisher

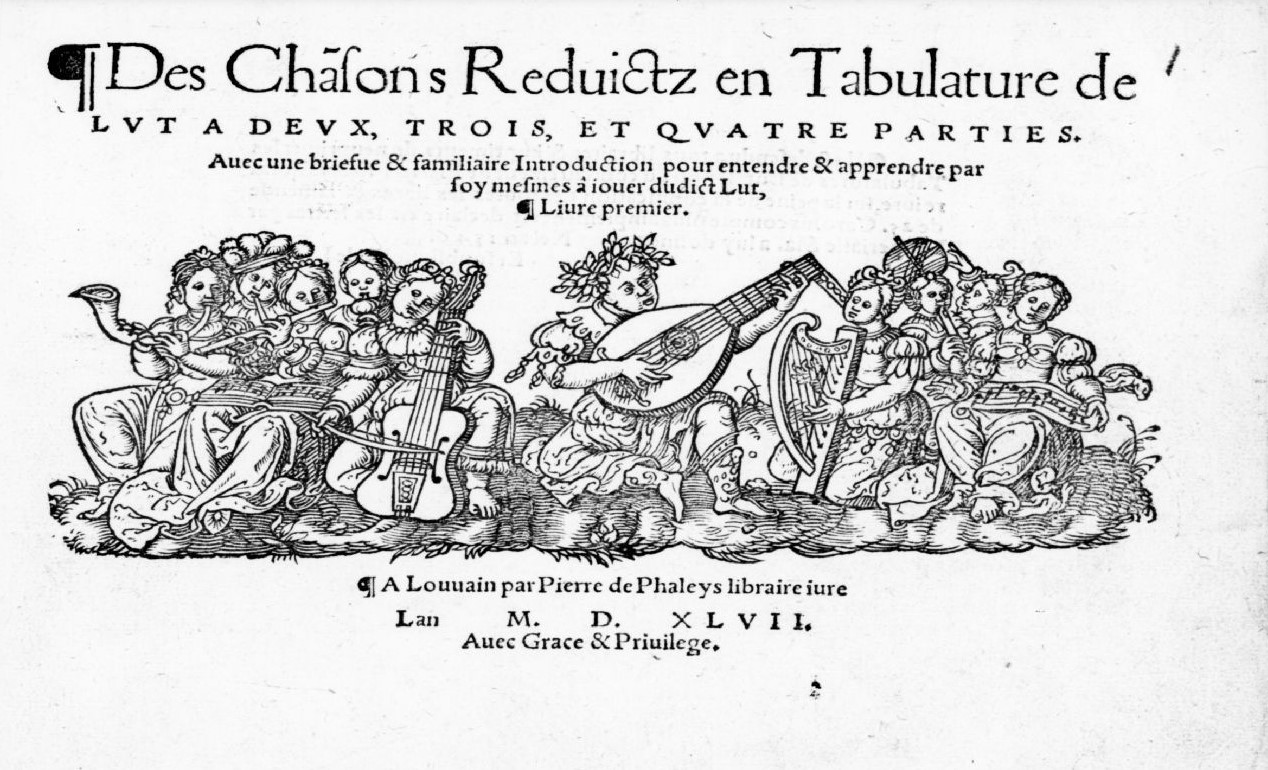
Title page of Des chansons reduictz en tabulature de lut... published by Phalesius in 1547

Peeter van der Phaliesen, Latinised as Petrus Phalesius, French versions of name Pierre Phalèse and Pierre de Phaleys (c. 1510 – c. 1575) was a Flemish bookseller, printer and publisher. Aside from a number of literary and scientific works, his printing press is mainly known for its publications of music. Phalesius was the principal publisher of music active in the sixteenth-century Low Countries.

== Life ==
Petrus Phalesius was born in Leuven about 1510. His original name was Peeter (or Pieter) van der Phaliesen. Phalesius started a bookseller business in 1545 and soon set up a publishing house.

Phalesius at first outsourced the printing of his books to other printers such as Jacob Bathen, Servaas van Sassen and Reynier Velpen. After obtaining a printing patent in 1552, he established himself as an independent printer in Leuven. By 1553 his press was printing his own high-quality output from movable type. In 1570 he entered into a partnership with Johannes Bellerus, a printer based in Antwerp, enabling him to reach a wider clientele.

Phalesius died in Leuven in 1575. His sons Cornelis (Cornelius) and Petrus Phalesius the Younger continued the family firm. The latter moved the business in 1581 to premises in Antwerp. In Antwerp the publishing house flourished into the seventeenth century under the direction of Petrus the Younger's daughters Maria and Magdalena.

== Publications ==
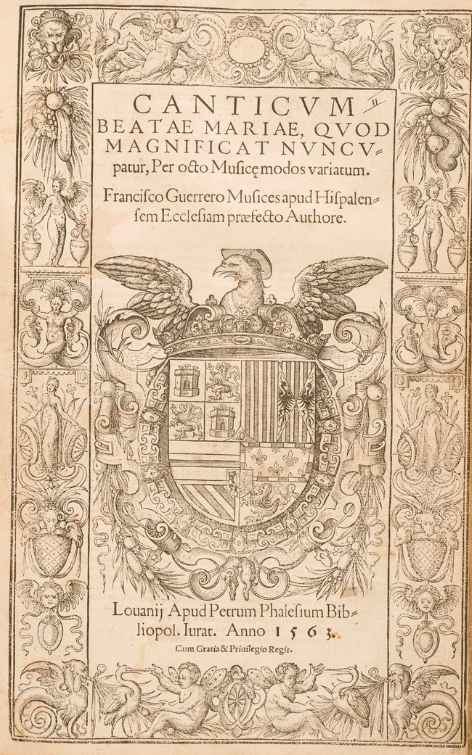
Frontispiece of Canticum Beatae Mariae, published by Phalesius in 1563. The convolute is recognized as masterpiece by the Flemish Community.

While the Phalesius press published a number of literary and scientific works such as Gemma Frisius' De radio Astronomico & Geometrico liber, it is mainly known for its publications of music. By 1575 the Phalesius press had published about 180 music books.

The majority of Phalesius's output is dedicated to sacred music—masses, motets and magnificats—the rest being a mix of French chansons, Italian madrigals, Flemish songs and instrumental works. Vocal and instrumental works are both represented. Because Phalesius put out a number of lute publications during the early years of his activity, some music historians believe that he may himself have played the lute.

Phalesius borrowed from many composers and did not hesitate to include works from collections of other publishers. For instance Phalesius' Een Duytsch musyck boeck (A Dutch music book) of 1572 copies no less than half of the songs from Niewe Duytsche Liedekens, met III. IIII. V. VI. ende VIII. partyen (New Dutch songs in 3, 4, 5, 6 and 8 parts) published by Jacob Bathen in Maastricht in 1554.

Many pieces are by Clemens non Papa and other Flemish composers such as Lassus and Rore, while some of his instrumental pieces are obviously borrowed from the Parisian publishers Le Roy and Ballard. Notable among these is Selectissima... in guiterna ludenda carmina (Leuven, 1570), a collection containing instructions (in Latin) for amateurs wishing to play the guitar, together with 115 pieces for that instrument. In the same year Phalesius published a collection of music for cittern under the title Hortulus cytherae.

Other publications include:

- Des chansons reduictz en tabulature de lut a deux, trois et quatre parties … (French and Dutch language songs transcribed for lute), Leuven, 1547
- Hortus musarum (over 100 pieces for lute), Leuven, 1552.
- Tiers livre des chansons, Leuven, 1560.
- Hadriani Willaert musici excellentissimi moteta, Leuven, 1561.
- Theatrum musicum (for lute), Leuven, 1563
- Luculentum theatrum musicum (for lute), Leuven, 1568.
- Recueil des fleurs produictes de la divine musique, Leuven, 1569.
- Canticvm beatæ Mariæ qvod magnificat nvncvpatur, per octo musice modos variatum, Leuven, 1563.
- Liber Primus Leviorum Carminum (Premier Livre de Danseries), Leuven, 1571.
- Liber leviorum Carminum, Antwerp, 1572.
- Een Duytsch musyck boeck (Dutch language songs of various composers including Servaes van der Meulen, Jan van Wintelroy, Clemens non Papa, Jean de Latre, Geert van Turnhout, Adrianus Stockaert, Ludovicus Episcopius, Jan Belle, Lupus Hellinck, Noë Faignient, Theodor Evertz and possibly Joannes Zacheus), Leuven and Antwerp, 1572.
- Selectissima carmina ludenda in Quinterna, Leuven, 1573.
- La Fleur des chansons a trois parties, Leuven, 1574.
