= Conrad Rupsch =

German composer

Conrad Rupsch or Konrad Rupff (c. 1475-1530, (fl. 1520s) was a German composer. He was kapellmeister to Frederick the Wise and later collaborated with Johann Walter and Martin Luther on the music for the Deutsche Messe.
