= Tielman Susato =

Flemish Renaissance composer

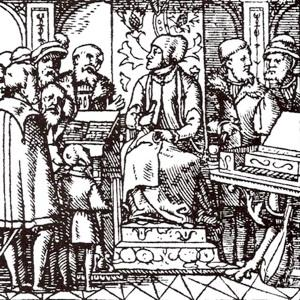
Tielman Susato offers his Chanson book to Maria of Hungary, governess of the Netherlands.

Tielman (or Tylman) Susato (c. 1510/15 – after 1570) was a Renaissance composer, instrumentalist and publisher of music in Antwerp.

== Biography ==
While Susato's exact place of birth is unknown, some scholars believe that because of his name—Susato meaning de Soest, of the town of Soest — he may be from the town of that name in Westphalia, or the town of Soest in The Netherlands.

Not much is known about his early life, but he begins appearing in various Antwerp archives of around 1530 working as a calligrapher as well as an instrumentalist: trumpet, flute and tenor pipe are listed as instruments that he owned.

In 1543, he founded the first music publishing house using movable music type in the Low Countries. He could be found in Antwerp, "At the Sign of the Crumhorn." Until Susato set up his press in Antwerp, music printing had been done mainly in Italy, France and Germany. Soon afterwards, Susato was joined by Petrus Phalesius the Elder in Leuven and Christopher Plantin, also in Antwerp, and the Low Countries became a regional center of music publishing. It is possible that Susato also ran a musical instrument business, and he attempted several times to form partnerships with other publishers but none was successful. In 1561 his son Jacob Susato, who died in 1564, took over his publishing business. Tielman Susato first moved to Alkmaar, North Holland, and later to Sweden. The last known record of him dates from 1570.

Susato was also an accomplished composer. He wrote (and published) several books of masses and motets which are in the typical imitative polyphonic style of the time. He also wrote two books of chansons which were specifically designed to be sung by young, inexperienced singers: they are for only two or three voices. Most important of his publications in terms of distribution and influence were the Souterliedekens of Clemens non Papa, which were metrical psalm settings in Dutch, using the tunes of popular songs. They were hugely popular in the Netherlands in the 16th century.

Susato was also a prolific composer of instrumental music, and much of it is still recorded and performed today. He produced one book of dance music in 1551, Het derde musyck boexken ... alderhande danserye, composed of pieces in simple but artistic arrangement. Most of these pieces are dance forms (allemandes, galliards, and so forth).

Often Susato dedicated his publications to prominent citizens of the town. Sometimes he devoted an entire volume to the works of one composer (for example Manchicourt and Crecquillon). Not surprisingly, he seems to have favored other Flemish composers as subjects for publication. He was also one of the first to publish music of the acclaimed late Renaissance composer Orlande de Lassus.

Susato is the namesake of the Belgium based Susato Trio and of the Susato line of woodwind instruments from the Kelischek Workshop for Historical Instruments.

== Sources ==
- Keith Polk (ed.), Tielman Susato and the Music of His Time. Print Culture, Compositional Technique and Instrumental Music in the Renaissance. Hillsdale/N.Y., Pendragon Press 2005, ISBN 1-57647-106-3 (partly online)
- Gustave Reese, Music in the Renaissance. New York, W.W. Norton & Co., 1954. (ISBN 0-393-09530-4)
- Articles "Printing and publishing of music," "Tielman Susato," in The New Grove Dictionary of Music and Musicians, ed. Stanley Sadie. 20 vol. London, Macmillan Publishers Ltd., 1980. (ISBN 1-56159-174-2)
- Dansereye 1551, performed by the New London Consort, Philip Pickett, conducting. Decca Record Company, London, 1993.
- Kristine K. Forney, "New Documents on the Life of Tielman Susato, Sixteenth-Century Music Printer and Musician," Revue belge de Musicologie/Belgisch Tijdschrift voor Muziekwetenschap, Vol. 36/38, (1982 - 1984), pp. 18–52. Published by: Societe Belge de Musicologie.
