= Stefan Bolesław Poradowski =

Polish composer (1902–1967)

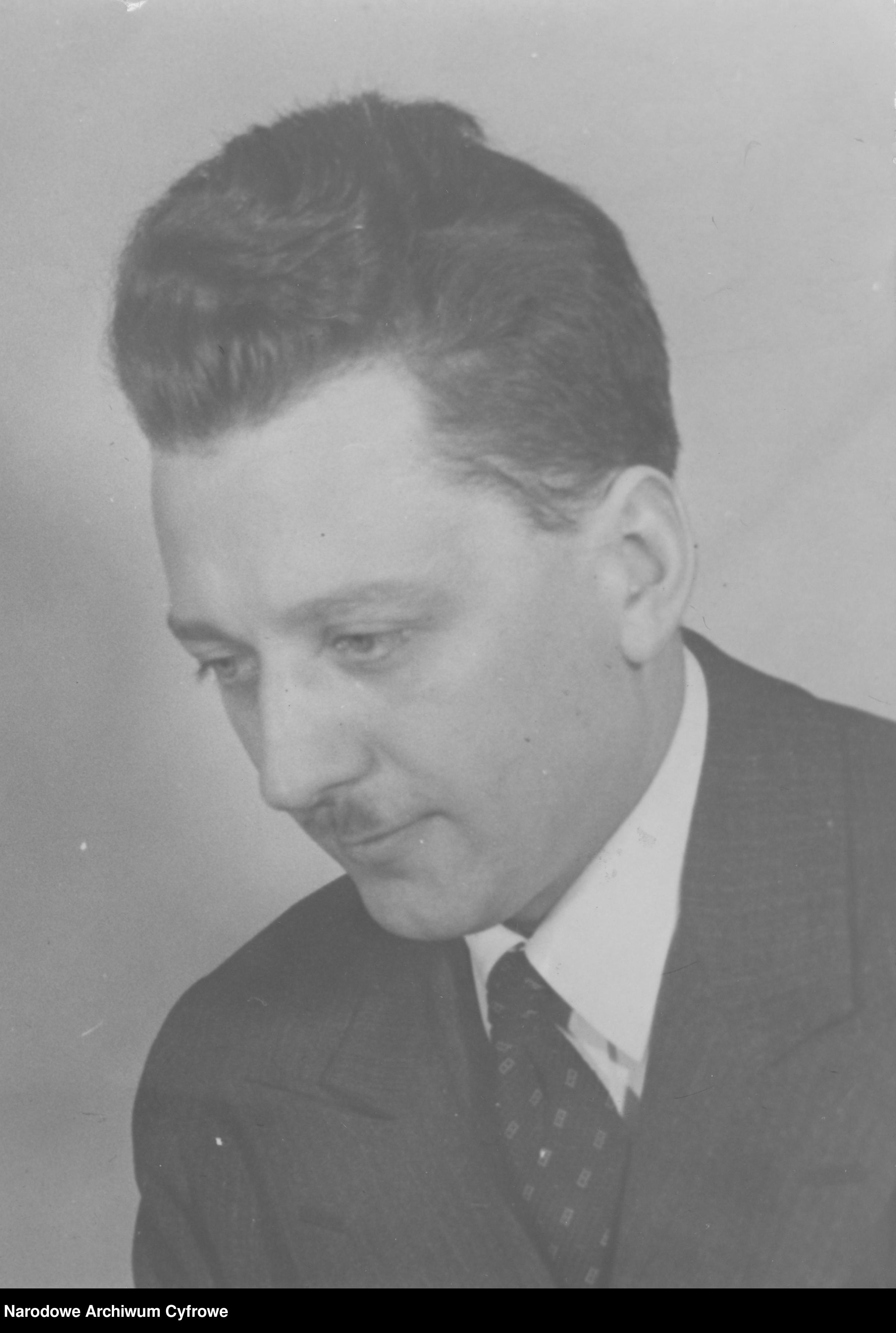
- Born: 16 August 1902; Włocławek, Congress Poland
- Died: 9 July 1967 (aged 64); Poznań, Poland

Stefan Bolesław Poradowski (16 August 1902 – 9 July 1967) was a Polish composer.

== Life ==
Poradowski was born on 16 August 1902 in Włocławek. He received his musical education in Włocławek at P. Bojakowskiego, then at the Conservatory of Music in Bydgoszcz Winterfeld. From 1922 to 1926 he studied in Poznań at the National Conservatory of Music where he studied composition and theory (Henryk Opieński) and the University (the right and musicology). Complementary studies in composition took place in Berlin with Emil Reznicek. He worked as a teacher of violin playing and lecturing on theoretical subjects in Poznań and Leszno, and in 1930 he became professor of theory and composition, as well as a special chamber orchestra director in the Poznań Conservatory. Before the war, he also lectured at the Municipal Conservatory of Music in Bydgoszcz (1935–1939), conducted the chamber orchestra and choir of the Society of Music "Harmony" in Poznań (1930–1939) and operated recenzencką. In 1939, he was arrested by the Germans and then taken to Opatów, Poland, where he worked as an organist and choral conductor.

In 1945, he again taught a special class of theory and composition at the State Music Academy in Poznań, where he was also Vice-rector and Dean of the Faculty of Composition, Theory and Conducting. In 1958, he became associate professor. At the same time, he led the composition class at the State Higher School of Music in Wrocław (in 1955), discussed the Poznań Philharmonic concert programs (1946–1956), and organized festivals and competitions nationwide. He was also a well-known artist, photographer, and longtime president of the Poznań branch of the Union of Polish Art Photographers.

The composer's wife was Wanda Lewandowska, the daughter of well-known druggist Louis Lewandowski.

Stefan Bolesław Poradowski died on 9 July 1967 in Poznań. He lies in the Crypt of the Meritorious Wielkopolska in the Church of St. Adalbert.

== Awards ==
He received many awards, including: Artistic Award of Poznań (1947), the Gold Cross of Merit (1955), Knight's Cross of the Order of Polish Rebirth (1964), Medal of Honour of the City of Poznań (1964) and Award of Degree of the Ministry of Culture and Arts ( 1966).

== Literary contributions ==
He wrote several textbooks on the theory of music, including Harmony Science (1931), Musical Instruments (1938), Diatonic-Harmonic Modulations (1939), The Fugue (1962), Acoustics for Musicians (1964), The Art of Writing canons (1965).

== Discography ==
Poradowski has over 130 works, including:

Symphonic Music
Symphonies (I - VIII)
Poznan City Hall symphonic poem, Op. 52 No. 1
Suites for popular topics: Dyngus Kuyavia and Wedding Scenes
Violin Concerto, Op. 70
Contrabass concerto, Op. 26
Concerto for flute, harp and strings, Op. 59 No. 1

Chamber Music
Antique Suite for String Orchestra, Op. 6
String quartets
String trio

Instrumental solo pieces
Piano:

Prelude and Fugue, Op. 8, No. 1
Memories Sonata, Op. 41
Classical Sonatina No. I and II

Violin:

Sonata, Op. 5
Nocturne, Op. 57
Preludium and Toccata, Op. 68

Mazurka for viola, Op. 24
Romance for Double Bass
Prelude for organ

Works for the stage
Flames opera, Op. 66 No. 1

Vocal Music
Cantata: The Triumph, Song of the spring, Horse Światowida, Poznan Rhapsody, Song of the Vistula
Redemption Oratorio
Choral works for mixed choir and male choir

Solo songs
Courtship
Lament of the Virgin Mary
Song of the Night
Song of Our Lady of Loretto
