= Pierre-Francisque Caroubel =

French violinist and composer

Pierre-Francisque Caroubel (1556 – summer 1611 or 1615) was a French violinist and composer. He is known for his dance music, bransles (he composed "Le Branle De Montirande") and galliards.

Caroubel was born in Cremona. He lived in Paris from 1576 and later collaborated with Michael Praetorius at the court of the Duke of Brunswick at Wolfenbüttel. He died in Paris.

== Publications ==
Some of his music was published after his death in the anthology Secret des muses (Amsterdam, 1615). Some of the music arranged by Praetorius in Terpsichore Musarum (1612) was also by Caroubel.
