= David Abell (composer) =

Danish-German composer and organist

David Abell or Abel Ebel (died c. 1576) was a Danish-German composer and organist. He worked in the Kantoriet (the choir and orchestra of the Danish king) of Christian III.

From 1555 to 1572 he was employed by the Marienkirche in Lübeck, after which he returned to Copenhagen on Frederick II's insistence. In the Kantoriet's records from 1541, there are four choral works by him.
