= Agnes Elisabeth Overbeck =

Anglo-Russian composer and pianist

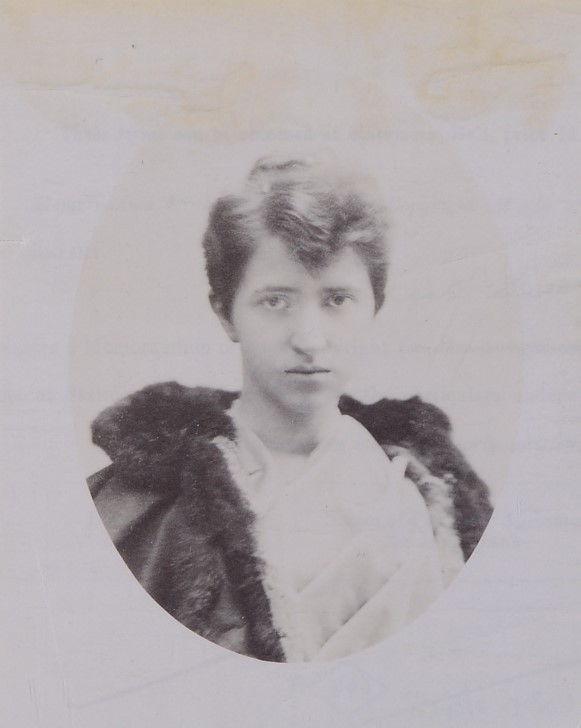
1894 Image of A E OVERBECK

Ella Overbeck, pseudonym Baroness Ella Overbeck or Overbach, also Agnes Elisabeth Overbeck, Elizabeth von Overbe(c)k, or Baroness Jo Overbeck (nicknamed Jimmy) (10 October 1870 – 12 November 1919) was an Anglo-Russian composer and pianist.

== Life and career ==
Born in Russia, Overbeck was brought to England as a young child by her parents, both Russians. Following their deaths, she was adopted by an English woman, and educated at the Royal College of Music. She was piano accompanist to Clara Butt and students of Manuel Patricio Rodríguez García in London. In the 1890s she made friends with Edith Craig (1869-1947) and her brother Edward, son and daughter of leading British actress Ellen Terry, and wrote the stage music for Edward's adaptation of Alfred de Musset's On ne badine pas avec l'amour (as No Trifling with Love), which was performed in Uxbridge in 1894. Overbeck's music was praised by the Musical Times; other early works, such as a violin sonata and various songs, were also positively reviewed by the musical press. A survey of women composers active in 1896 described Overbeck, though a 'baby' song-writer by comparison with the older Cecile Chaminade and Guy d'Hardelot, as possessing "a unique talent", demonstrated through "a boldness, a carelessness, sometimes an almost Eastern flavouring running through her songs —melodies and harmonies—that seem to me to be quite unlike any other woman I know of."

In 1898 Overbeck, visiting Taormina (a resort in Sicily, and at the time a popular gay tourist destination) was introduced to Zinaida Hippius. Hippius was married to a writer, Merezhkovsky, but was bisexual, and she and Overbeck began an affair. Overbeck later travelled to join Hippius in Saint Petersburg. In the winter of 1902-3 Merezhkovsky's translations of Euripides' Hippolytus and Sophocles' Antigone were performed with Overbeck's incidental music at the Alexandrinsky Theatre in Saint Petersburg. Overbeck later returned to Britain, basing herself in South West England. Her orchestral music became a regular feature of Frank Winterbottom's "Symphony Concerts" in Plymouth, including a performance of her Petersburg stage music in East Stonehouse at Plymouth on 21 February 1904, which Baroness Overbeck conducted herself. During the First World War she may have based herself in Bexhill-on-Sea, East Sussex.

Overbeck died in Stuttgart at age 49.

== Work ==
- Eleanore. Song, words by E. Mackay. London: C. Woolhouse, [1893]
- [Two Songs.] London : R. Cocks & Co, 1894.

I've wept in Dreams. Words by Heine.
A Slave Girl's Song. Words by C. Kingsley.

- Parted. Song, words by T. Hood. London: C. Woolhouse, [1893]
- Since my Love now loves me not. [Song.] Words by Heine, translated by F. Johnson. London: C. Woolhouse, [1893]
- Toi. Old French poetry. [Song.] London: C. Woolhouse, [1893]
- The Voice of the Beloved. [Song.] Poetry ... from Marie Corelli's "Soul of Lilith". London: C. Woolhouse, [1893]
- Four Lyrics. London: J. Williams 1903.

1. Les Sanglots longs. With long-drawn Sobs. French words P. Verlaine, English words M. C. Gillington.
2. Peu de Chose. Life's a Bubble. French words L. de Montenaeken, English words M. C. Gillington.
3. Butterflies, from J. Davidson's adaptation of F. Coppée's "Pour la Couronne".
4. Chanson d'Aspiration. Song of Aspiration. French words by E. Overbeck ... English words by M. C. Gillington.

- Sonate pour piano et violon. London: Charles Woolhouse [o. J.]
- A Russian Love Song. Premiered at the BBC Proms in 1911.
