= Cornelis Boscoop =

Dutch organist, singer, and composer

Cornelis Symonszoon Boscoop (or Buschop, Boskop) (died 1573) was a Dutch organist, singer, and composer. He was organist at the Oude Kerk in Amsterdam in the middle of the 16th century and was one of the predecessors of Jan Pieterszoon Sweelinck in this position.

== Works ==
Little is known about Boscoop's life. The only surviving work of Boscoop's is the Fifty Psalms of David (1562). It was published in a new edition in 1568 in Düsseldorf and was dedicated to the Duke of Brunswick and Lüneburg, Erich II (Calenberg-Göttingen). The title page of the tenor part bears the following text: "Psalmen Dauid/ Vyfftich/ mit vier partyen/ zeer zuet ende lustich om singen en speelen op verscheiden instrumenten/ gecomponeert door M. Cornelius Buschop". the dedication is dated January 1568 and bears the words "tho Delft", though it is not clear whether Boscoop only briefly stayed there or whether he might have lived or worked in Delft at this time.

For his texts, Boscoop used the Souterliedekens widespread in the Netherlands. However, he did not use the melodies common to the Souterliedekens, but instead composed entirely new material for them.

Many of the motets are in tripartite formal structure, ABC and ABA', with the opening and closing parts often repeated with a different text in the repeat. Some of the psalm settings have melodic and harmonic progressions which are characteristic of late Renaissance innovations.
