= Ars Musici =

German classic music record label

Coordinates: 47.9867°N 7.9043°E

Ars Musici is a German classical music record label founded in Freiburg im Breisgau in 1993 by Rudolf Ruby after his retirement from Deutsche Harmonia Mundi. "The ARS MUSICI label was founded in Freiburg (Breisgau) in 1993. The label was soon very much in demand and went on to become one of Germanyʼs ... The label was purchased in 2008 by Membran.
