= Jan van Wintelroy =

Franco-Flemish composer and choirmaster

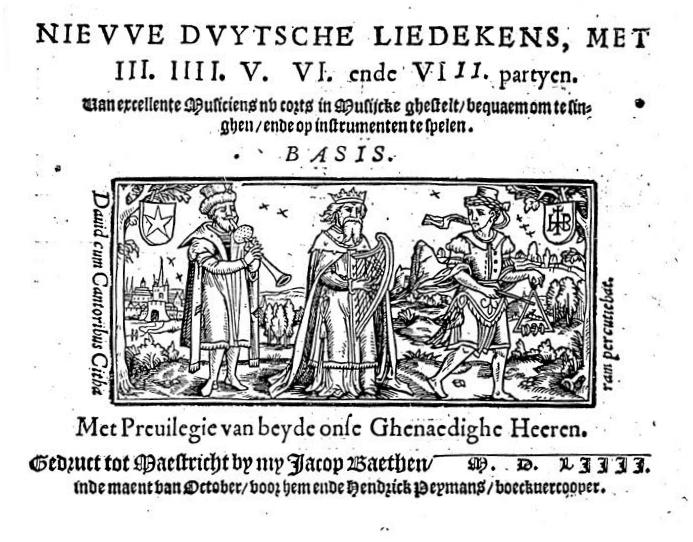
Title page of Dat ierste boeck vanden nieuwe Duijtsche liedekens, published by Jacob Bathen in Maastricht in 1554

Jan van Wintelroy or Joannes Wintelroy (fl. 1520–1576) was a Franco-Flemish composer and choirmaster.

== Life and work ==
From 1529 onwards, Wintelroy was connected to the Illustrious Brotherhood of Our Blessed Lady, or in Dutch Illustre Onze Lieve Vrouwe Broederschap, in 's-Hertogenbosch, as a singer and priest. He was appointed choirmaster on 19 July 1551 and maintained this job until 30 June 1574, whereupon he still remained the person responsible for intonation at the chapel of the brotherhood. In the anthology of Dutch songs, Dat ierste boeck vanden nieuwe Duijtsche liedekens, published by Jacob Bathen in Maastricht in 1554 (no complete copy survived; the soprano is lacking) one song for four voices by Wintelroy is included:

- Al is den tijd nu doloreus

Petrus Phalesius reedited this song in his Duijtsch musijck boeck, an anthology of Dutch, songs published in Leuven in 1572.

== Sources ==
- M.A. Vente, De Illustre Lieve Vrouwe Broederschap te 's-Hertogenbosch 1541–1620. II in Tijdschrift van de Vereniging voor Nederlandse Muziekgeschiedenis, D. 19de, Afl. 3de/4de (1962–1963), p. 163–172
- Jan Willem Bonda, De meerstemmige Nederlandse liederen van de vijftiende en zestiende eeuw. Hilversum, Verloren, 1996. ISBN 90-6550-545-8
