= Jean de Latre =

Flemish Renaissance composer and choirmaster

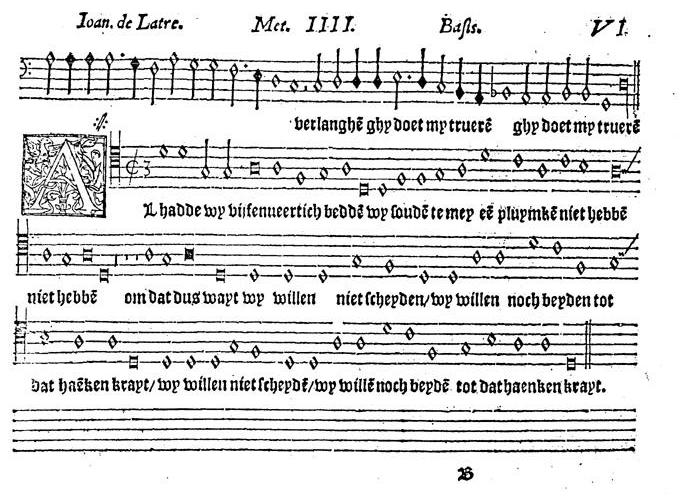
A Flemish chanson by Petit Jean De Latre, taken from the anthology Dat ierste boeck vanden Niewe Duytsche Liedekens published by Jacob Bathen (Maastricht, 1554)

Petit Jean De Latre (c. 1505 or 1510 – 31 August 1569) or Joannes de Latre (his surname is also recorded as Delattre, Delatre, De Lattre and Laetrius) was a Flemish Renaissance composer and choirmaster who worked in Liège and Utrecht. He is no longer believed to be the same person as Claude Petit Jehan who died in 1589.

== Life ==
The earliest record of his employment is for 1538 to 1539 when he was maître de chant at church of St John the Evangelist in Liège. Subsequently, De Latre was employed at St Martin, Liège. From about 1550 he was also chapel master to George of Austria, Prince-Bishop of Liège (1544–1557), to whom De Latre dedicated his first volume of secular songs or chansons of 1552.

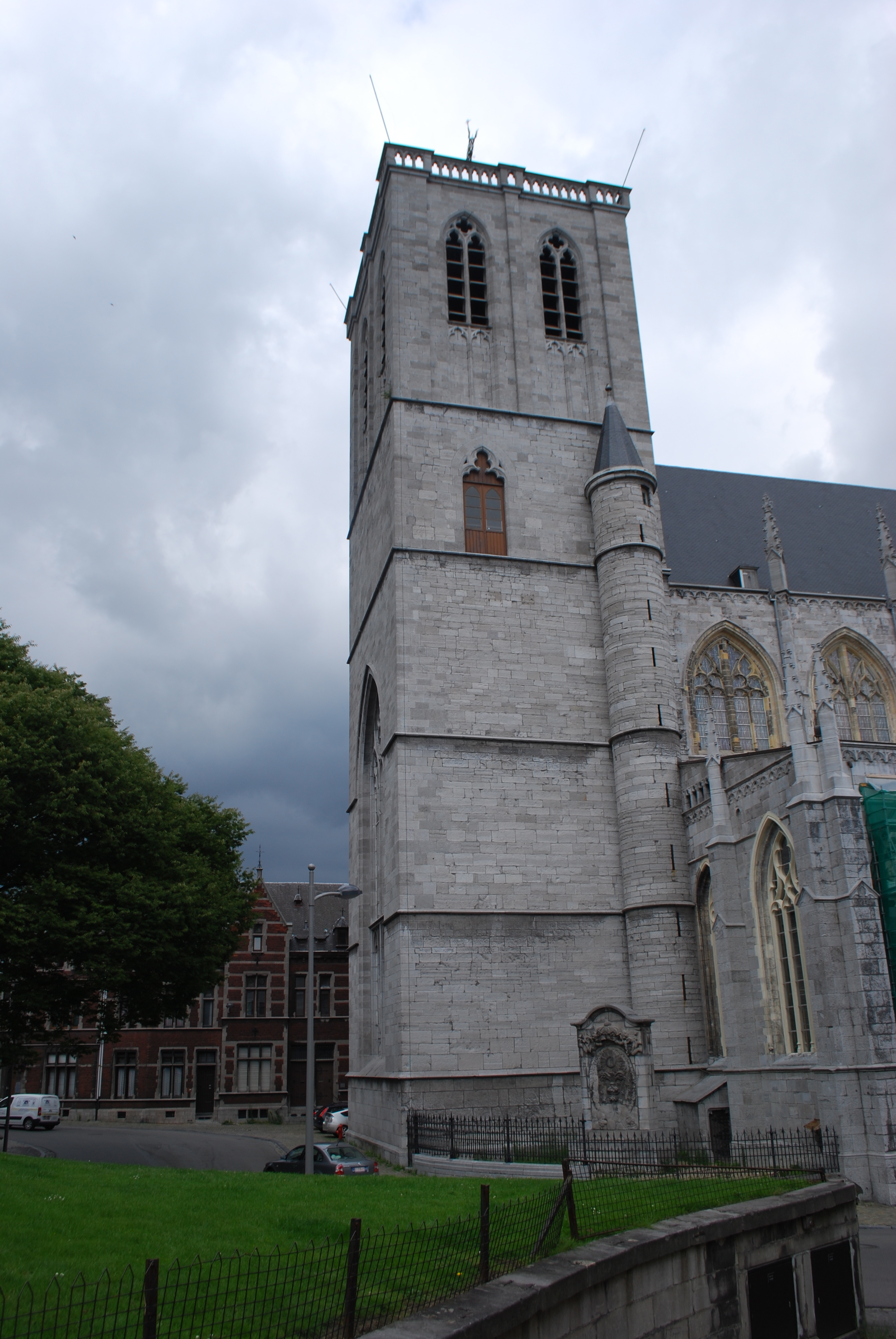
Saint-Martin, Liège

During his time in Liège notable pupils included Gerard de Villers and Johannes Mangon.

After George of Austria's death in 1557 De Latre continued to work at St Martin, but in 1563 took up a post for a short period in Amersfoort (within the province of Utrecht). Around this time the former rector of the Latin school in Amersfoort, Johannes Oridryus, together with Albertus Buysius, undertook the publication of a collection De Latre's chansons, Cantionum musicarum, in Düsseldorf. De Latre returned to Liège as succentor at St Martin, but was dismissed for debt in 1564.

By 1565 De Latre was employed at the Janskerk in Utrecht where he is described as a Magister and Cantor. He may later have been employed at the Buurkerk there. He was buried at the Buurkerk in Utrecht in 1569, where his epitaph described him as a musici excellentissimi.

The best attested of his works are his published chansons and the set of Lamentations, which was published in 1554 in Maastricht by the Flemish printer Jacob Bathen. The work entitled Lamentationes aliquot Jeremiae was dedicated to Anton of Schauenburg, at that time the dean of the Saint Servatius chapter in Maastricht, and later archbishop of Cologne. In addition a number of works survive in manuscript, but some may be by other composers.

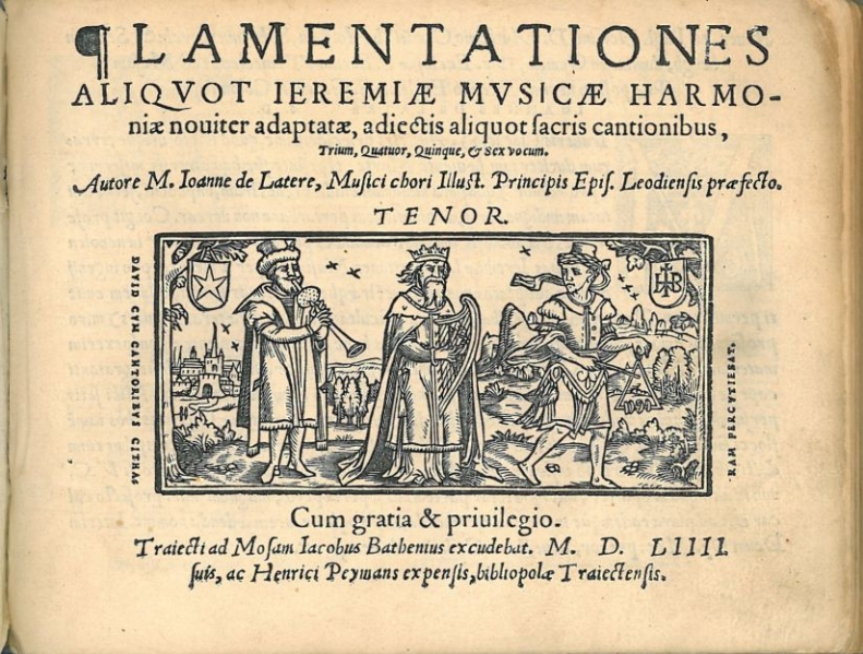
Title page of Jean de Latre's 'Lamentationes aliquot Ieremiae', part for tenor, published by Jacob Bathen in 1554

== Works ==
- Lamentationes aliquot Jeremiae for 3 voices (Jacob Bathen, Maastricht, 1554)
- Sacred motets, at least 16 of which have been identified (1547–1564)
- 29 secular chansons in his first book, Chansons à quatre parties (Leuven, 1552)
- 24 French and Flemish chansons or songs in Cantionum musicarum quae diversis vocibus (Düsseldorf, 1563)
- Further chansons including Livre septiesme (Leuven, 1564)

== Recordings ==
- Renaissance am Rhein, Singer Pur, Oehms Classics, 2011 - includes the motet Qualis est dilecta mea and the chansons Comme la rose and Si seule estois.
- Maastrichts Liedboek / Maastricht songbook (Nieuwe Duytsche Liedkens - Jacob Bathen, 1554), Camerata Trajectina, Globe Records GLO 6046, recorded 1999 - includes the Flemish chanson Al hadden wij vijfenveertich bedden.
