= Oehms Classics =

German classical music label

- Founded: 2003
- Founder: Dieter Oehms
- Genre: classical music
- Country of origin: Germany
- Location: Poing, Bavaria
- Official website: www.oehmsclassics.de

Oehms Classics is a German classical music label founded in 2003 by Dieter Oehms (born in Manderscheid, Bernkastel-Wittlich in 1941), a former manager for 35 years with DGG/Polygram and Arte Nova/BMG.
