= Jacobus Clemens non Papa =

16th-century Flemish composer

Jacobus Clemens non Papa (also Jacques Clément or Jacob Clemens non Papa) (c. 1510 to 1515 – 1555 or 1556) was a Netherlandish composer of the Renaissance based for most of his life in Flanders. He was a prolific composer in many of the current styles, and was especially famous for his polyphonic settings of the psalms in Dutch known as the Souterliedekens.

== Life ==
Nothing is known of Clemens's early life, and even the details of the years of his artistic maturity are sketchy. He may have been born in Middelburg, Zeeland, though the evidence is contradictory; certainly he was from somewhere in modern Belgium or the Netherlands. The first unambiguous reference to him is from the late 1530s, when Pierre Attaingnant published a collection of his chansons in Paris. Between March 1544 and June 1545 he worked as succentor at the cathedral of Bruges, and shortly thereafter he began a business relationship with Tielman Susato, the publisher in Antwerp, which was to last for the rest of his life. From 1545 until 1549 he was probably choirmaster to Philippe de Croÿ, Duke of Aerschot, one of Charles V's greatest generals, where he preceded Nicolas Gombert. In 1550 he was employed as sanger ende componist ("singer and composer") by the Illustrious Brotherhood of Our Blessed Lady in 's-Hertogenbosch. There is also evidence that he lived and worked in Ypres and Leiden. It is speculated on slender evidence that he also worked in Dordrecht.

There are several theories regarding the origin of the epithet "non Papa". One holds that it was jokingly added by his publisher, Susato, to distinguish him from Pope Clement VII—"Jacob Clemens—but not the Pope." Another states that it is to distinguish him from Jacobus Papa, a poet also from Ypres. However, considering that Pope Clement VII died in 1534, before any of Clemens's music was published, and that the confusion with the poet is unlikely in that the surnames were quite distinct, it is likely that the nickname was merely created in jest rather than for practical reasons. Nonetheless, the suffix has remained throughout the ages.

Details about his death are not known, but he probably died in 1555 or 1556. The 1558 text in Jacobus Vaet's Continuo lacrimas, his déploration on Clemens's death, suggests that he met a violent end, though if true, the circumstances are not given. According to a 1644 source, Clemens was buried at Diksmuide near Ypres in present-day Belgium.

== Works and influence ==
Unlike many of his contemporaries, Clemens seems never to have traveled to Italy, with the result that Italian influence is absent in his music. He represents the northern European dialect of the Franco-Flemish style.

Clemens was one of the chief representatives of the generation after Josquin and before that of Palestrina and Orlandus Lassus. He was primarily a composer of sacred music; roughly 80 percent of his compositions were sacred music, either for liturgical or private use. Only three of his approximately 233 motets use secular texts; all three are hymns of praise of music. However, he composed over 100 secular works that encompass the whole gamut of poetic genres used by composers of his generation. Considering that his career as a composer lasted for barely two decades, Clemens was an extremely prolific composer. His output includes :

- 15 masses, including 14 parody masses and a requiem mass (most of which were published from 1555 to 1570 by Petrus Phalesius the Elder in Leuven); two mass sections (a Kyrie and a Credo)
- 15 Magnificats
- c. 233 motets
- Just over 100 secular pieces, including: 89 chansons (only 77 of which are considered authentic and are included in the complete edition of his works), 8 Dutch songs, 8 textless pieces, 2 intabulated chansons, and 1 instrumental canon (doubtful)
- 159 Souterliedekens, i.e., Dutch settings of the psalms, using popular song melodies as cantus firmus.

Of all these works, the Souterliedekens were perhaps the most widely known and influential. The Souterliedekens were published in 1556–1557 by Susato in his Musyck Boexken ("Music Books"), IV-VII and comprised the only Protestant part-music in Dutch during the Renaissance. Based on a preceding volume of Souterliedekens printed by Symon Cock that contained monophonic settings of the psalms in Dutch, Clemens's Souterliedekens became the first complete polyphonic setting of all 150 psalms in Dutch. Presumably, the original verse translation of the Psalter into the Dutch language was completed by Willem van Nievelt from Wittenberg. Clemens's part-settings are generally simple, and designed to be sung by people at home. They use the well-known secular tunes that were printed in the Cock edition, including drinking songs, love songs, ballads, and other popular songs of the time, as a cantus firmus. Most of them were set for 3 parts, and there are 26 different combinations of these voices. Some of the Souterliedekens are based on dance-songs and are frankly homophonic and homorhythmic, while others use imitation. It is notable that these pieces of music survived the ban in 1569 when the government under the Duke of Alba censured all books that were deemed heretical.

After Clemens's death, his works were distributed to Germany, France, Spain, and even among various circles in England. The influence of Clemens was especially prominent in Germany. Franco-Flemish composer Lassus in particular knew his music well and incorporated elements of his style.

== Memorial year ==
In 2012, Clemens's supposed 500th anniversary is celebrated in several of the towns where he is thought to have worked as a singer and composer.

== Recording ==
- Clemens non Papa, Priest And Bon-vivant, Capilla Flamenca together with La Caccia, Joris Verdin and Jan Van Outryve, 2005 (KTC 1287)

== References and further reading ==
=== Bibliography ===
- Atlas, Allan W. Renaissance Music: Music in Western Europe, 1400–1600. New York: W.W. Norton & Company, 1998. ISBN 978-0-393-97169-9
- Elders, Willem; Forney, Kristine; Planchart, Alejandro. L. Macy (ed.). Jacobus Clemens non Papa. Grove Music Online. (subscription required)
- Brown, Howard M. and Louise K. Stein. Music in the Renaissance, 2nd ed. Upper Saddle River, NJ: Prentice Hall, 1999. ISBN 978-0-13-400045-9
- Knighton, Tess and David Fallows, eds. Companion to Medieval and Renaissance Music. Berkeley: University of California Press, 1992. ISBN 978-0-520-21081-3
- Perkins, Leeman L. Music in the Age of the Renaissance. New York: W.W. Norton & Co., 1999. ISBN 978-0-393-04608-3
- Raeburn, Michael and Alan Kendall, eds. Heritage of Music, Vol 1. Oxford: Oxford University Press, 1990. ISBN 978-0-19-520493-3
- Reese, Gustave. Music in the Renaissance. New York: W.W. Norton & Co., 1954. ISBN 0-393-09530-4
- Taruskin, Richard. The Oxford History of Western Music, Vol. 1: The Earliest Notations to the Sixteenth Century. Oxford: Oxford University Press, 2005. ISBN 978-0-19-516979-9
- Jas, Eric, ed. Beyond Contemporary Fame. Reassessing the Art of Clemens non Papa and Thomas Crecquillon. Turnhout: Brepols, 2005. ISBN 2-503-51884-2
