= Penning =

Penning may refer to:

== Currency ==
- Norwegian penning
- Swedish penning

== People ==
- Jared Penning (born 2000), American football player
- Mike Penning (born 1957), British politician
- Frans Michel Penning (1894–1953), Dutch physicist
- Edmund Penning-Rowsell (1913–2002), British journalist
- Louwrens Penning (1854-1927), Dutch novelist

== Other uses ==
- Penning trap, energy storage device
- Penning gauge, vacuum gauge
- Penning ionization, form of ionization
- Penning mixture, a gas mixture
- Pony penning, annual pony roundup on Chincoteague island
- Team penning, western equestrian sport
- another word for writing
- confining animals in an enclosure (pen)

== See also ==
- Pennings, a surname
