= Joseph Braat =

Dutch optics engineer and professor

Joseph J.M. Braat (born 5 November 1946) is a Dutch optics engineer and scientist. Between 1973 and 1998 he worked at Philips Research Laboratories. He was professor of optics at Delft University of Technology between 1998 and 2008.

== Career ==
Braat was born in Breda on 5 November 1946. He studied physics at Delft University of Technology. After his graduation he moved to France to work at the coherent optics group of Serge Lowenthal at the Institut d'Optique in Orsay. His PhD thesis was on holography using spatially incoherent light. In 1973 Braat returned to the Netherlands to work at Philips Research Laboratories. There he contributed to early research on optical disc systems. During this period he developed a theory together with Harold Hopkins and Gijs Bouwhuis on the read-out of optical discs through diffraction of light by the information carrying disc structure. He also contributed to the design of light paths for optical disc systems. At Philips Research Laboratories Braat contributed to lens and system design for early photolithographic systems by Philips and ASML.

In 1988 Braat became a part-time professor of geometrical optics at Delft University of Technology. In 1998 he became a full professor of optics. During this time he performed research on extreme ultraviolet lithography, optical aperture synthesis for astronomy, high density optical recording, Extended Nijboer-Zernike theory and Terahertz imaging. In 1991 Braat was one of the founders of the European Optical Society. From 2004 to 2006 he served as its President. Braat retired as professor in 2008.

In 1994 Braat won the Edward Longstreth Medal for Computer and Cognitive Science of the Franklin Institute for "contributions to optical data recording and design of aspherical objective lenses for read-out systems of optical storage". Braat was elected a member of the Royal Netherlands Academy of Arts and Sciences in 2001. He became a Fellow of the European Optical Society in 2012. In 2019 he received the Holst Memorial Lecture Award from Eindhoven University of Technology.

Braat has received 60 US patents.

== Bibliography ==
Braat is the author or co-author of some 150 scientific publications. His main work is the 1000-page textbook Imaging Optics, which also contains contribution from second author Peter Török.

=== Books ===
- G. Bouwhuis, J. Braat, A. Huijser, J. Pasman, G. van Rosmalen, K.A.S. Immink, Principles of Optical Disc Systems, Hilger, Bristol, UK (1985).
- J. Braat, P. Török, Imaging Optics, Cambridge University Press, Cambridge, UK (2019).
