= Gilius van Bergeijk =

Dutch composer

Gilius van Bergeijk (born 7 November 1946 in The Hague) is a Dutch composer.

Taught by Kees van Baaren and Dick Raaymakers (electronic music), Gilius van Bergeijk is a teacher at the Royal Conservatory of The Hague. Van Bergeijk also studied oboe and alto saxophone, playing with Peter Brötzmann in the Instant Composers Pool orchestra.

Many of his works focus on the transformation of familiar materials through deconstructive formal processes. Some of his better known works include:

- 6 Piano installations.
- On Death and Time 1980 (for electronic instruments, piano, organ contralto voice)
- Symphony of a 1000 (alphabetically)
- BAC 1968-1970 for Barrel organ

Notable students include Richard Ayres, Allison Cameron, Kristoffer Zegers, Sinta Wullur, Frank Martinez and many other composition students who have passed through the Royal Conservatory of the Hague. See: List of music students by teacher: T to Z#Gilius van Bergeijk.

Van Bergeijk is also an avid cyclist and speed-skater.
