= Bernard D. H. Tellegen =

Dutch electrical engineer (1900–1990)

Bernard D.H. Tellegen
- Born: 24 June 1900; Winschoten, Netherlands
- Died: 30 August 1990 (aged 90); Eindhoven, Netherlands
- Education: Delft University
- Awards: IEEE Edison Medal (1973)
- Scientific career
- Workplaces: Philips Natuurkundig Laboratorium; Delft University

Bernard D.H. Tellegen (24 June 1900 – 30 August 1990) was a Dutch electrical engineer and inventor of the pentode and the gyrator. He is also known for a theorem in circuit theory, Tellegen's theorem.

He obtained a master's degree in electrical engineering from Delft University in 1923, and joined the Philips Natuurkundig Laboratorium (Philips Physics Laboratory) in Eindhoven. In 1926, he (and Gilles Holst) invented the pentode vacuum tube. The gyrator was invented by him around 1948. The gyrator is useful to simulate the effect of an inductor without using a coil. For example, it is used in hi-fi graphic equalizers. He held 41 US patents.

In the period 1946–1966, Tellegen was an adjunct professor of circuit theory at the University of Delft. From 1942 to 1952, he was president and honorary member of the Netherlands Electronics and Radio Society.

The Australian Institute of Radio Engineers appointed Tellegen an honorary life member in 1953. He was Fellow of the IEEE, and he won the IEEE Edison Medal in 1973 "For a creative career of significant achievement in electrical circuit theory, including the gyrator". Tellegen was elected a member of the Royal Netherlands Academy of Arts and Sciences in 1960. In 1970, the University of Delft conferred him a doctor honoris causa degree.
