= Kees Vuik =

Dutch mathematician

Cornelis (Kees) Vuik (Capelle aan den IJssel, Jan. 25, 1959) is a Dutch mathematician and emeritus professor. In 1982 he received his master's degree in applied mathematics from Delft University of Technology in Netherlands. He worked at Philips Natuurkundig Laboratorium for six months. He completed his Ph.D. at Utrecht University in 1988. His research focused on moving-boundary problems (Stefan problems) and he was supervised by Prof. dr. E.M.J. Bertin and Prof. dr. A. van der Sluis. Vuik then worked at TU Delft, successively as assistant professor, associate professor, and eventually full professor of Numerical Analysis (2007-2026) in the Faculty of Electrical Engineering, Mathematics and Computer Science. From 2022-2025, he served as chair of the Delft Institute of Applied Mathematics (DIAM) department.

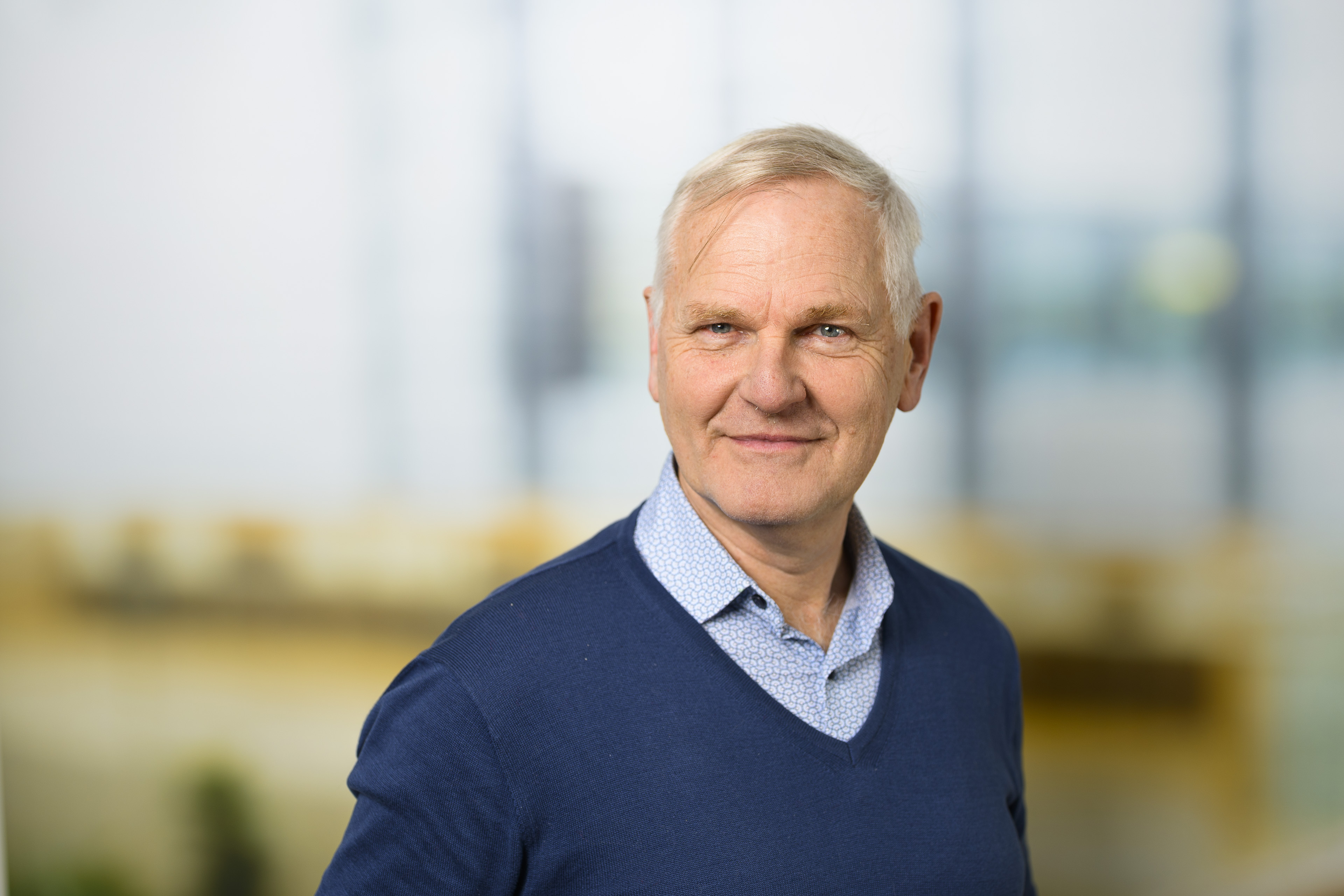
Kees Vuik

== Research ==
Vuik's primary research interests are in numerical linear algebra. He also works on simulators for energy networks and high-performance computing. Several dozen Ph.D. students have been supervised by Vuik. His research has led to many publications in international journals. He was the founder of the TU Delft Institute for Computational Science and Engineering (DCSE), of which he has been the director from 2007 to 2025. The institute connects TU Delft researchers from various disciplines that make use of computational methods. Thanks to his efforts, a High-Performance Computing facility was created within TU Delft, to which he has been a scientific director from 2020 to 2023. From 2012 to 2019, Vuik also served as scientific director of the 4TU.Applied Mathematics Institute (4TU.AMI) of TU Delft, TU Eindhoven, the University of Twente and Wageningen University & Research. Under his leadership, the institute has grown into an important player within the Dutch mathematical community, with connections to similar institutes such as Matheon in Berlin. 4TU.AMI has also contributed to the innovation of mathematics education. In 2013, Vuik participated in a Flemish-Dutch economic mission to Texas as a representative of (at the time) the 3TU federation.

== Teaching ==
Vuik is active in developing mathematical courses, BSc. and MSc. curricula, and educational innovations. He founded the minor Computational Science and Engineering. He is the coordinator of the international program Computer Simulation for Science and Engineering (COSSE), established in cooperation with TU Berlin and KTH Royal Institute of Technology Sweden. Vuik was also closely involved in the Massive Open Online Course (MOOC) Mathematical Modeling Basics. Tens of thousands of students have already participated in this online course. Vuik is a faculty advisor of the SIAM Student Chapter Delft of the Society for Industrial and Applied Mathematics (SIAM). He is further involved in the development and application of Multi-Media Math Education (MUMIE), an open-source e-learning platform in mathematics.

== Awards ==
Vuik has won several awards throughout his career, including:

- 2026: SIAM Fellow;

- 2022: Professor of Excellence Award of the Delft University Fund;

- 2021: Officer in the Order of Orange Nassau;

- 2017: Bronze medal of the TU Delft.

== Ancillary positions ==
Some of Vuik's ancillary positions are:

- Jury member of the ASML graduation prize for mathematics at the Royal Holland Society of Sciences and Humanities (KHMW);

- Participant in the mathematics council of the Dutch Platform for Mathematics (PWN);

- President-director of the Batavian Society of Experimental Philosophy;

- Treasurer at EU-Maths-IN;

- Chairman of the local organizing committee of ICIAM 2027;

- Member of the organizing committee of the SIAM Conference on Computational Science and Engineering in 2021 and 2023.
