= Frans Michel Penning =

Dutch physicist (1894–1953)

- Born: 12 September 1894; Gorinchem, Netherlands
- Died: 6 December 1953 (aged 59); Utrecht, Netherlands
- Education: University of Leiden
- Known for: Penning ionization Penning trap Penning vacuum gauge
- Scientific career
- Fields: Physics, gas phase ion chemistry
- Workplaces: Philips Natuurkundig Laboratorium
- Doctoral advisor: Heike Kamerlingh Onnes

Frans Michel Penning (12 September 1894 – 6 December 1953) was a Dutch experimental physicist. He received his PhD from the University of Leiden in 1923, and studied low pressure gas discharges at the Philips Laboratory in Eindhoven, developing new electron tubes during World War II. Many detailed observations of gas ionization were done with colleagues, finding notable results for helium and magnetic fields. He made precise measurements of Townsend discharge coefficients and cathode voltage fall. Penning made important contributions to the advancement of high resolution mass spectrometry.

== Biography ==
=== Early life and education ===
Penning was born in west Netherlands in the town of Gorinchem on 12 September 1894. Penning attended the University of Leiden. He studied mathematics and physics as a graduate student under Heike Kamerlingh Onnes. Penning's doctoral work involved measuring thermodynamic properties of various gases at extremely low temperatures. Penning received his PhD on June 25, 1923, with a dissertation entitled Metingen over isopyknen van gassen bij lage temperaturen (Measurements on isometric density lines of gases at low temperatures).

=== Family ===
His father Louwrens Penning, was a popular novelist in the Dutch literary community; most known for romanticizing the Anglo-Boer War. His mother was Adriana Jenneke Machelina Heijmans. Penning married Margje Dercksen in 1921 and they had six children named Lourens, Hendricus, Paul, Ad, Nellie and Else

== Philips Natuurkundig Laboratorium ==
=== Early career ===
In 1924, Penning was hired as an experimental physicist at the Dutch section of the Philips research department located in the Strijp district of Eindhoven. Gilles Holst, former assistant to Heike Kamerlingh Onnes, and head of the Philips Natuurkundig Laboratorium (NatLab), tasked Penning with continuing research on gas discharge phenomena to develop new lamps. Penning investigated breakdown energy potentials of low pressure inert gas discharges. In 1926, Penning observed that electrons under direct voltage current in low-pressure mercury discharges reach high velocities due to high-frequency oscillations in the gas. This observations challenged Irving Langmuir's observations. Penning also investigated the impact gas density and electrode distance have on the voltage and stability of noble gas mixture discharges by measuring Paschen curves.

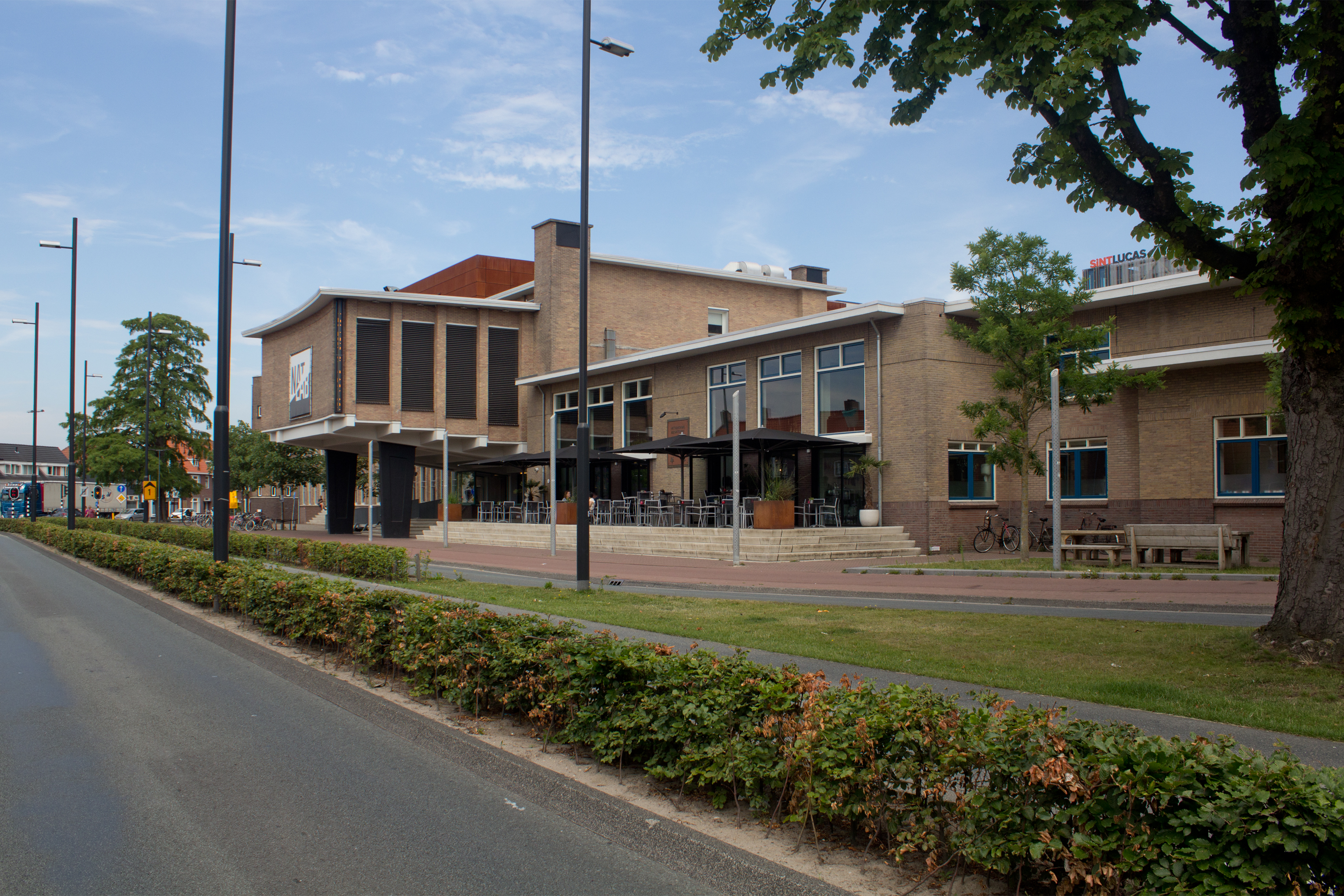
Philips Natuurkundig Labarotorium (NatLab) located in the Strijp district of Eindhoven, Netherlands

=== Penning ionization ===
Penning ionization is a form of chemi-ionization, an ionization process involving reactions between neutral atoms or molecules. The Penning effect, as it is often called, describes an ionization chain reaction caused by high energy collision between excited inert gas (i.g. argon) metastable atoms and trace gas impurities whose ionization potential is less than the stored potential of the meta-stable molecule. These collisions cause the release of electrons; which can interact with other stable noble gas molecules to create more meta-stables, resulting in more ionizing reactions. Penning first reported the effect in 1927. The Penning effect is used in gas-discharge neon lamps and fluorescent lamps, where the lamp is filled with a Penning mixture to improve the electrical characteristics.

=== Penning gauge ===
Penning invented a type of cold cathode vacuum gauge known as the Penning gauge, which Philips commercialized.

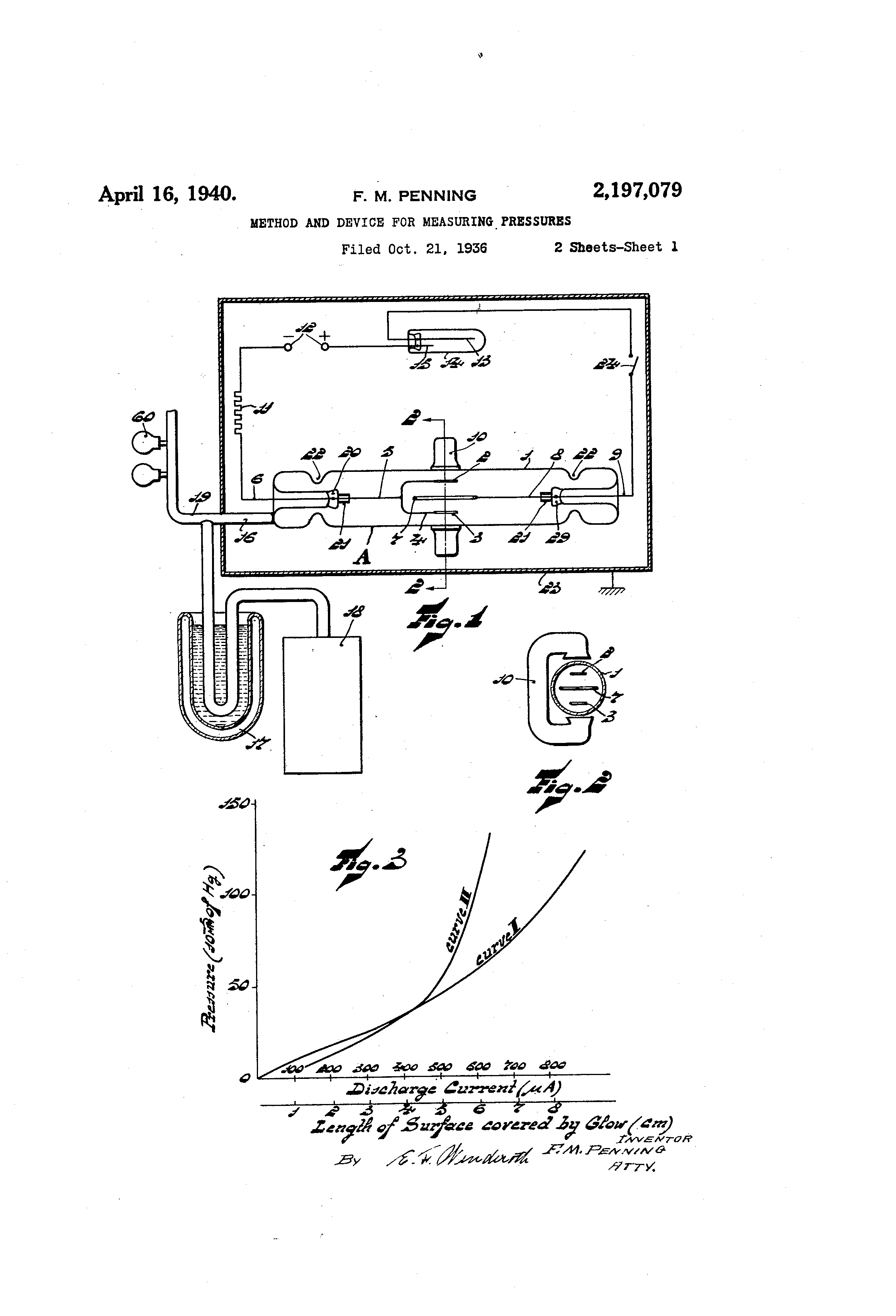
1936 patent schematic of the method and device used to measure low pressure gases by cold cathode, developed by Penning while working at the NatLab

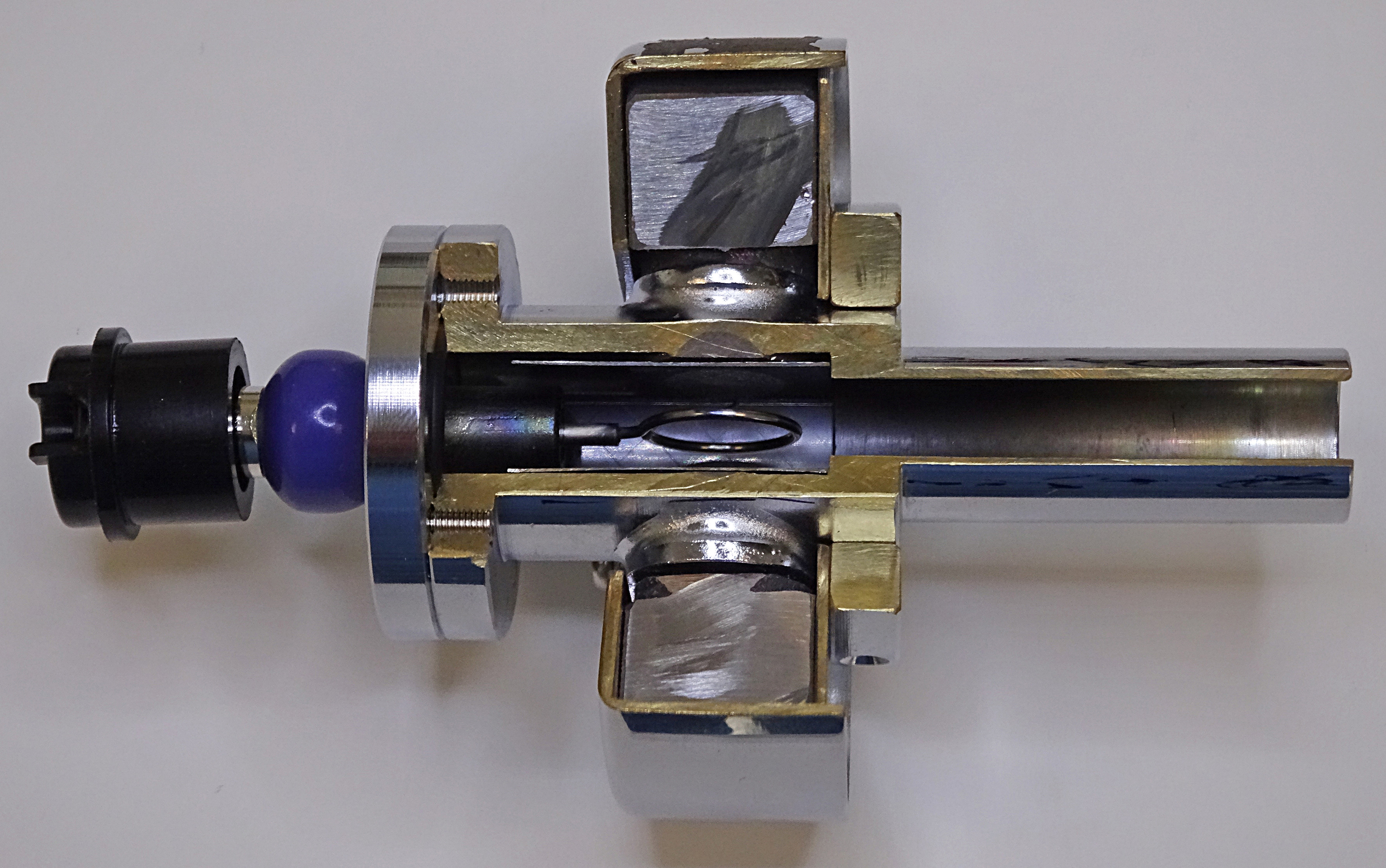
Penning vacuum gauge (open)

Penning investigated the effect of magnetic fields on low pressure gas discharges. He determined that the energy current through a discharge tube in a magnetic field could be used to reliably measure the pressure. In his first attempt to measure the energy current, Penning used a triode ion gauge system with a linear electron flight path. This method worked, but was fragile and ineffective at very low pressures. In his second attempt, he equipped his vacuum tube with a ring shaped cathode and two anode plates above and below in a magnetic field. Electrons now traveled a longer flight path out of the ring, between electrodes in a spiral orbit. Increasing the electron flight path allowed for more collisions with meta-stable atoms. This amplified the electron signal, which was sufficient to measure gas pressure. The Penning manometer (vacuum gauge) emerged as a practical application.

=== Penning trap ===
The Penning trap stores charged particles by magnetic and electric fields. It was named after Penning by Hans Georg Dehmelt who built the first trap. Dehmelt got inspiration from the vacuum gauge built by Penning where a current through a discharge tube in a magnetic field is proportional to the pressure. Penning traps are currently used for magnetic measurements and are an active research topic. The introduction of this trap has led to new approaches in high resolution mass spectrometry with mass spectrometers such as the ion cyclotron, resonance spectrometer, or ion trap.

=== Late career ===
For a short period during World War Two Penning worked at the Philips Tube Factory developing high frequency electron tubes. Penning, with M. J. Druyveseyn, wrote a review of his work on gas discharges that was published in 1940 in the American journal Reviews of Modern Physics. Due to the German occupation of the Netherlands, Penning did not see the published text until 1946. After the war he focused on the phenomena of cathode fall during glow-discharge reactions. Penning created a cathode tube with a more stable voltage by removing the oxide layer from the cathode; this allowed for consistent measurement of cathode fall. In the 1950s Penning’s health began to deteriorate. He died on December 6, 1953, at Utrecht.

== Selected patents ==
- Magnetic field controlled gas filled discharge device, US2543702A, 1941-04-11
- Device comprising a glow discharge tube, US2577352A, 1948-01-14
- Coating by cathode disintegration, US2146025A, 1935-12-28
- Electronic device, US2211668A, 1937-01-23

== Selected publications ==
- Penning, F. M., Metingen over isopyknen van gassen bij lage temperature. Ph.D. dissertation. Leiden, 1923.
- Penning, F. M., "Scattering of electrons in ionized gas", Nature, Philips Natuurkundig Laboratorium 118: 301. doi:10.1038/118301a01926. Eindhoven, Holland, 1926.
- Druyvesteyn, M. J., and Penning F. M., "The Mechanism of Electrical Discharges in Gases of Low Pressure". Reviews of Modern Physics, Philips Natuurkundig Laboratorium 12(2): 87–174. doi:10.1103/RevModPhys.12.87. Eindhoven, Holland, 1940.
- Penning, F. M., "Electrical discharges in gases". Translation of "Electrische gasontladingen". Philips Technical Library, Macmillan. New York, 1957.
- Penning, F. M., "The contraction phenomenon in a neon glow discharge with molybdenum". Philips Technical Library Eindhoven, Holland, 1945

== See also ==
- Timeline of low-temperature technology
