= ESPRIT project =

ESPRIT, or the Elite Sport Performance Research in Training is a UK EPSRC and UK Sport funded research project aiming to develop pervasive sensing technologies for better the understanding of the physiology and biomechanics of athletes in training, and apply the technologies to enhance the well being and healthcare of general public.

== Key research themes ==
- Generalised Body Sensor Networks - Imperial College London
- Optimised Sensor Design and Embodiment - Queen Mary University of London
- Learning, Data Modelling and Performance Optimisation - UK Sport, Imperial College London
- Device and Technology Innovation (GOLD) in elite sports - Loughborough University

== Proof of concept projects ==
- Application of a solid-state saliva-based system to monitoring circadian rhythms in elite athletes - Swansea University
- Real-time wireless localisation for team sports using body-centric communications - Queen's University Belfast
- Optimized athlete body sensor networks for simulation-based performance analysis - Southampton University

== Showcase/secondment projects ==
- Monitor the effects of a warm-up on power production and wheelchair performance - Loughborough University
- Using interleukin-6 (IL-6) as a measurement of exercise-induced inflammation - Loughborough University
- Improvement of Powerwheel for racing wheelchairs - Frazer-Nash Consultancy Ltd.
- Ankle and Foot Modelling in Elite Cycling - Paul Francis

== Sports exemplars ==
A number of sports exemplars have been selected in the ESPRIT Programme to demonstrate and validate the application of pervasive sensing technology in elite sport performance monitoring

ESPRIT Sports Exemplars
Sports	Short Description
Rowing	The physiology and biomechanics of rowers and rowing techniques have been widely studied, but most of the studies were conducted in laboratory settings, as measuring equipment is often laborary based and can not be used on the boat. To enable real-time monitoring of athletes' physiology and capturing biomechanical indices, a number of pervasive sensing devices have been developed under the ESPRIT programme.
Swimming	To understand the biomechanics of a swim is often difficult, as tradition measuring tools cannot be used under water. In most cases, the biomechanic indices can only be captured by swimmers simulating the swimming movements in dry land. Under the ESPRIT programme, a number of wireless sensing technologies have been developed aiming to provide a real-time unobtrusive monitoring system for elite swimmers.
Cycling	To facilitate the training of cyclist, a cycling ergometer is developed in the ESPRIT programme. Despite integrated with sensors to capture the force profile of the cyclist, the new ergometer can emulate different cycling conditions.
Rugby	
Sprinting	
Wheelchair basketball/rugby	
Basketball	
Weightlifting	

== Healthcare exemplars ==
One of the main objectives of the ESPRIT project is to extend the developed sensing technology for wellbeing and healthcare applications. To demonstrate the application of the technology, a number of healthcare exemplars have been selected.

- Fall detection
- Post-operative care
- Rehabilitation after knee-replacement surgery
- COPD patient monitoring
- Elderly care

== Key Partners ==
Imperial College London	Loughborough University
Queen Mary, University of London	UK Sport
British Olympic Association	Paralympics GB
Lawn Tennis Association	England Rugby
England Cricket	England Football
Adidas	Association of British Healthcare Industries
BAE Systems	British Telecom
DSTL - Defence Science and Technology Laboratory	Help the Aged
IMEC Holst Centre	LGC - Laboratory of the Government Chemist
Live-Work	NPL - National Physical Laboratory

== See also ==
- Wireless sensor networks
