= Song of the Second Moon =

Studio album by Dick Raaijmakers and Tom Dissevelt
- Released: 1968
- Recorded: 1957–1961
- Studio: Philips Research Laboratories
- Genre: Electronic music
- Length: 32:35
- Label: Limelight Records

Song of the Second Moon is a 1968 album of electronic music by Dutch composers Dick Raaijmakers (Kid Baltan) and Tom Dissevelt.

Kid Baltan and Tom Dissevelt are considered pioneers in electronic and electroacoustic music, and Song of the Second Moon popularized the genre. It follows their 1962 album, The Fascinating World of Electronic Music.

Song of the Second Moon was produced in the years 1957–1961 in the Philips Research Laboratories in Eindhoven.

== Track listing ==
No.	Title	Writer(s)	Length
1.	"Song of the Second Moon"	Kid Baltan	2:49
2.	"Moon Maid"	Tom Dissevelt	3:12
3.	"The Ray Makers"	Kid Baltan	7:22
4.	"The Visitor from Inner Space"	Tom Dissevelt	3:07
5.	"Sonik Re-Entry"	Tom Dissevelt	2:35
6.	"Orbit Aurora"	Tom Dissevelt	3:00
7.	"Twilight Ozone"	Tom Dissevelt	5:25
8.	"Pianoforte"	Kid Baltan	5:05
Total length:			32:35

== Interest ==
The song "Song of the Second Moon" was the theme song of the scientific magazine program "Delta" on Hungarian Television for decades.
