= Jan Boerman =

Dutch composer (1923–2020)

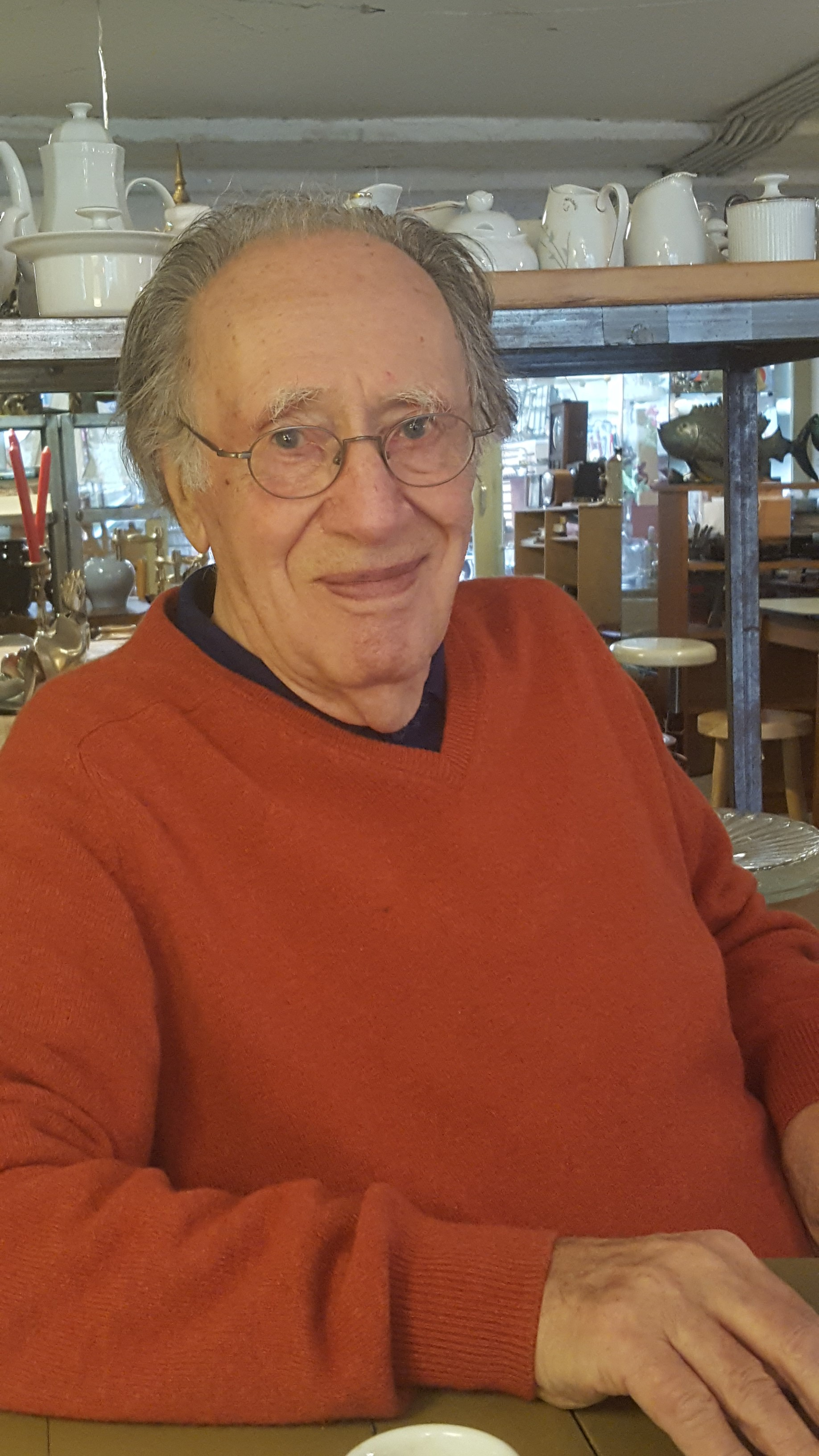
- Jan Boerman in his later years.
- Born: 30 June 1923; The Hague, Netherlands
- Died: 25 October 2020 (aged 97)
- Occupation: Composer
- Known for: Vocalise (1994)

Jan Boerman (The Hague, 30 June 1923 – 25 October 2020) was a Dutch composer who specialised in electronic music from 1959.

== Life and career ==
Boerman was trained in the traditional manner as a pianist and composer, and his initial exposure to the electronic music studio was both a shock and a revelation. There was relatively little "repertoire" in this new domain, so, while he had been struggling with serialism and "finding his voice", Boerman intuited that here was a vast new terrain to explore, free from the stylistic pressures (i.e., the triumvirate of Paris, Darmstadt, and Cologne) that were so powerfully felt at that time in Europe.

Boerman studied at the Royal Conservatory of Music in his home town, with Léon Orthel (piano) and, from 1945, with Hendrik Andriessen (composition). From 1956 onwards, Boerman worked in the electronic studios of Delft Polytechnic, Utrecht State University and of The Hague Royal Conservatory of Music, where he has also taught electronic composition (after 1974) and piano. From the 1970s, he integrated live electronic music with instrumental and vocal music. Boerman also composed theatre and ballet music, "music for the listening museum" and, in collaboration with architect Jan Hoogstad, "music as architectonic space". From 1974, as Professor of Electronic Composition at the Royal Conservatory in the Hague, he assisted many young composers in finding their way forward. Notable students include Sinta Wullur.

The Delft Polytechnic in Utrecht, from which the Institute of Sonology was developed, housed the first electronic music studio in the Netherlands after the Philips laboratory in Eindhoven, which was not generally open to composers. A select few composers were invited to work at Eindhoven, including Edgard Varèse (who created his Poème électronique there in 1958) but, by 1960, Philips decided to close the facilities. It passed its equipment on to the Delft Polytechnic, which became the primary site for electronic music in the Netherlands. Administrative problems, however, caused both Boerman and Dick Raaijmakers to leave Utrecht in 1963, whereupon they began setting up a private studio in the Hague. Raaijmakers had been studying broadcasting, recording, and applied electronics at Philips, so was more drawn into the world of studio composition. Their facility eventually became incorporated into the Royal Conservatory of The Hague, and both men became members of the faculty. Years later, in 1986, the Institute of Sonology echoed their move by transferring from Utrecht to the Royal Conservatory in the Hague.

Boerman wrote his last major work, Ruïne, in 1997. He died in October 2020 at the age of 97. The complete tape music of Jan Boerman has been published on CD by the NEAR / Donemus label.

== Prizes ==
Boerman received the Matthijs Vermeulen Award Prize for his entire body of work in 1981 and the Willem Pijper Prize for his composition Vocalise 1994 in 1997. The Complete Tape Music of Jan Boerman appeared in 1998 on CD (CV-NEAR 04/05/06/07/08), and won the Edison award for Dutch recorded music.

== Compositions ==
Boerman has composed a number of orchestral and chamber music works; the main part of his oeuvre, however, consists of electronic music. He is one of the few composers who persisted in composing for tape. It was not until 1976, that Boerman ventured to include "live" sounds in his work: the result was Vocalise - Voorstudie (Preparatory study for a Vocalise). It was followed by an "orthodox" tape: Kompositie 1979. For the ensemble Het Nieuwe Leven, he composed "Weerstand" ("Resistance", 1982) for tape and percussion, and later "Ontketening" ("Unchainment", 1983), for tape and metal instruments. Boerman has also written electronic ballet music, including "De touwen van de tijd" ("The ropes of time") and "Monument voor een gestorven jongen" ("Monument for a dead boy"). "Muziek voor slagwerk en orkest" ("Music for percussion and orchestra", 1991) was performed during the Holland Festival of 1991.

- no date Adagio, for orchestra no date Scherzo, for orchestra
- no date Symfonisch rondo, for orchestra
- no date Muziek tegen 2 dansers, balletmusic for piano
- 1950 4 Stukken voor piano (Four Pieces for Piano) 30'
- 1955 Kleine toccate, for piano (published by Alsbach, Amsterdam)
- 1956 Prelude, Rondo, Fantasia, Finale, for 2 pianos* 30'
- 1959 Musique concrète, electronic music
- 1960 Alliage, electronic music 10'
- 1960 Rhinoceros (text: Ionesco), electronic theatermusic
- 1961 Etude sonore, electronic music
- 1961 Alchemie 1961, electronic music 13'
- 1963 Illusie, balletmusic
- 1964 Een groot dood dier (text: B. Schierbeek), electronic theatermusic
- 1964 De bouwers van het rijk (text: B. Vian), electronic theatermusic
- 1965 Monument voor een gestorven jongen, electronic balletmusic
- 1965 De zee I, electronic music* 26'
- 1966 De zee II, electronic music* 18'
- 1968 Zonnesteen (tekst: O. Paz), for speaking voice and electronic music* 35'
- 1970 The ropes of time, electronic balletmusic
- 1970 Negen varianten, electronic music
- 1970 Kompositie voor twee pianos, for two pianos
- 1972 Kompositie 1972, electronic music* 13'
- 1974 Kompositie 1974, electronic music 12'
- 1976 Vocalise-voorstudie, electronic music
- 1979 Kompositie 1979, electronic music* 18'
- 1980 3 Stukken voor 2 pianos 45'
- 1981 Weerstand, music for el. guitar and tapes* 22'
- 1983 Ontketening I, for 3 aluminium plates and tapes 28'
- 1984 Ontketening II, for percussion, electronics and tape* 30'
- 1988 Maasproject, for brass, Fairlight computer-synthesizer and 16 track tape
- 1988 Vlechtwerk, electronic music* 13'
- 1989 Kompositie 1989, (het evenwicht), electronic music* 19'
- 1989 Die Vögel, for choir, brass quartet and 2 tapes* 40'
- 1990 Voor de Fabriek, electronic music
- 1991 Tellurisch, electronic music* 32'
- 1991 Muziek voor slagwerk en orkest*, for percussion and orchestra 22'
- 1992 Cortège, for 2 pianos* 17'
- 1993 Scherzo, for 2 pianos* 15'
- 1993 Vocalise, electronic music 32'
- 1994 Vocalise 1994, electronic music*
- 1994 Fuga, for 2 pianos
- 1994 Maasproject (Klank-Kleur-Beweging), electronic music* 36'
- 1994 Kringloop I-II-III, electronic music* 40'
- 1995 Muziek voor het Maasproject I-II, electronic music*
- 1995 Kringloop I-II, electronic music*
- 1996 Introductie en fuga, for 2 pianos* 11'
- 1997 Ruïne, electronic music* 16'

* score published by Donemus, Amsterdam.
