= Kees Schouhamer Immink =

Dutch engineer, inventor, and entrepreneur (born 1946)

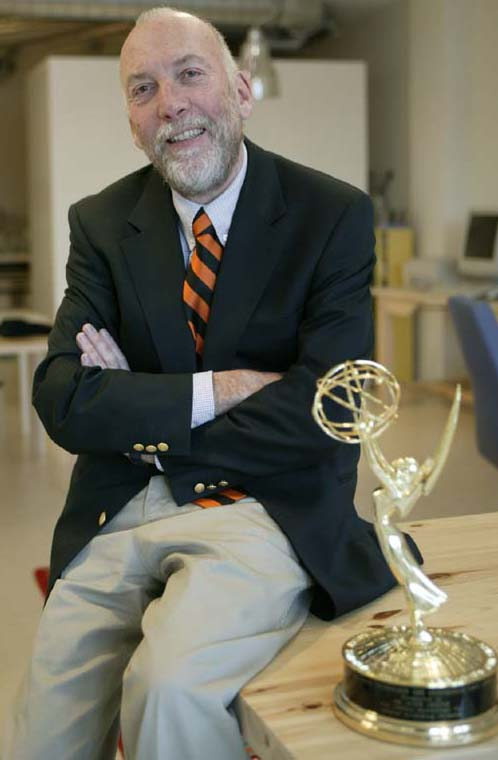
- Kees Schouhamer Immink in 2004 with his Emmy Award
- Born: Kornelis Antonie Schouhamer Immink; 18 December 1946 (age 79); Rotterdam, Netherlands
- Education: Eindhoven University of Technology
- Known for: Compact disc; DVD; Blu-ray
- Awards: Edison Medal (1999); AES Gold Medal (1999); Emmy Award (2003); SMPTE Progress Medal (2004); Faraday Medal (2015); IEEE Medal of Honor (2017)
- Scientific career
- Fields: Electronics; Information Theory
- Workplaces: Turing Machines Inc; Philips Research Laboratories; Institute for Experimental Mathematics; National University of Singapore

Kornelis Antonie "Kees" Schouhamer Immink (Dutch pronunciation: [kɔrˈneːlɪs ɑnˈtoːni keːs ˈsxʌuɦaːmər ˈɪmɪŋk]; born 18 December 1946) is a Dutch engineer, inventor, and entrepreneur who pioneered and advanced the era of digital audio, video, and data recording, including popular digital media such as the compact disc (CD), DVD and Blu-ray disc. He has been a prolific and influential engineer, who holds more than 1,100 United States and international patents. A large portion of the commonly used audio and video playback and recording devices use technologies based on his work. His contributions to coding systems assisted the digital video and audio revolution, by enabling reliable data storage at information densities previously unattainable.

Immink received several tributes that summarize the impact of his contributions to the digital audio and video revolution. Among the accolades received are the IEEE Medal of Honor "for pioneering contributions to video, audio, and data recording technology, including compact disc, DVD, and Blu-ray", the Edison Medal and an individual Technology Emmy award by the National Academy of Television Arts and Sciences (NATAS). Beatrix, Queen of the Netherlands, knighted him in 2000. He was elected a member of the National Academy of Engineering in 2007 for pioneering and advancing the era of digital audio, video, and data recording. Royal Holland Society of Arts and Sciences introduced the Kees Schouhamer Immink Prize in 2019 as a means to encourage research on information science and tele-communications. He was elected a Fellow of the International Core Academy of Sciences and Humanities (CORE Academy) in 2025.

Currently, Immink holds the position of president of Turing Machines Inc, which was founded in 2001. During his career, Immink, in addition to his practical contributions, has contributed to information theory. He has written over 300 articles and 11 books, including Codes for Mass Data Storage Media. He has been an adjunct professor at the Institute for Experimental Mathematics, University of Duisburg and Essen, Germany, since 1994, as well as affiliated with the National University of Singapore (NUS) and Singapore University of Technology and Design (SUTD) as a visiting professor.

== Education ==
Immink obtained an Engineer's degree (Ir.) in electrical engineering (1974, cum laude) and a PhD degree (1985) from Eindhoven University of Technology on a thesis entitled Properties and Constructions of Binary Channel Codes.

== Early years at Philips Research ==
Fresh from engineering school, in 1967, he joined Philips Research Labs in Eindhoven, where he spent thirty years in a fruitful association. The renowned physicist Hendrik Casimir was director of Philips Research till 1972. Immink described the atmosphere at that time: "We were able to conduct whatever research we found relevant, and had no pre-determined tasks; instead, we received full freedom and support of autonomous research. We went to work, not knowing that we would do that day. This view – or rather ambiguous view – on how research should be conducted, led to amazing inventions as a result. It was an innovation heaven". Immink worked in various groups, and in 1974, he joined the research group Optics, where pioneering work was done on optical laserdisc systems. He contributed mainly to the electronics and servo technology of the video disc. In a joint effort, MCA and Philips brought the laserdisc system to the market. Laserdisc was first available in Atlanta in 1978, two years after the VHS and four years before the CD. The Laserdisc never managed a significant presence in market share. The Philips/MCA Laserdisc operation was not successful and discontinued in 1981.

== Compact Disc ==
Around 1976, Philips and Sony showed prototypes of digital audio disc players, which were based on optical videodisc technology. In the interview by Tekla Perry for the IEEE Spectrum, May 2017, Immink explains that he got involved in the CD project at the end of 1979 when Sony and Philips had decided to jointly settle on one design. Both Philips and Sony had shown prototype CD players to the press in 1978. The team at Philips, he says, "needed someone to do measurements of the two competing systems, the quality, how they coped with scratches, how they coped with imperfections of the disc. My job with the LaserDisc was finished, so I said, 'Sure, I could do it.'" Both Philips and Sony had come up with different rules for translating digital audio data to sequences of pits and lands. The protoypes were not yet ready for market launch. Its maximum playing time of less than an hour and 14-bit audio quality did not meet the required marketing specifications. In addition, the discs were susceptible to scratches causing track loss. These limitations had to be overcome before the CD player could be introduced to the market. After a lot of experimentation, Immink improved the playing time by thirty percent by inventing a code that could better cope with the servo systems. The encoding system Immink devised came to be called eight-to-fourteen modulation (EFM).

Immink took part in the joint Sony–Philips task force, which developed the Compact Disc standard, the Red Book. He contributed to the EFM and CIRC coding schemes.

In the article, "Shannon, Beethoven, and the Compact Disc", Immink presents a historical review of the years leading up to the launch of the CD, and the various crucial decisions made. He refutes the urban legend that the compact disc's diameter was increased from 115 to 120 mm solely to hold the 74 minutes playing time of Beethoven's Ninth Symphony conducted by Wilhelm Furtwängler. Commercial disputes also played a part.

After the CD standard was set in 1980, Immink and his co-workers conducted pioneering experiments with magneto-optical audio recording on pre-grooved discs. They also found a simple method to extend the analog videodisc standard with digital sound. The new systems were brought to market as MiniDisc and CD Video. Laserdiscs fabricated after 1984 have digitally encoded sound signals.

== DVD and Blu-ray Disc ==
In 1993, Toshiba engineers developed the Super Density Disc, the successor of the Compact Disc. Immink was a member of the Philips and Sony task force, which developed a competing disc format, called MultiMedia CD. Immink created EFMPlus, a more efficient successor of EFM used in CD. The electronics industry feared a repeat of the format war between VHS and Betamax in the 1980s. IBM's president, Lou Gerstner, urged them to adopt Immink's EFMPlus coding scheme as EFM has a proven record. In September 1995, an agreement was made among the major industries: Philips/Sony surrendered to Toshiba's SuperDensity Disc and Toshiba accepted the EFMPlus modulation. The DVD encompasses the sound-only Super Audio CD (SACD) and DVD-audio formats, developed independently by Sony and Toshiba, which are incompatible formats for delivering very high-fidelity audio content. SACD is in a format war with DVD-Audio, but neither has yet managed to replace audio CDs.

Immediately after the DVD standard was settled in 1996, Philips and Sony, disappointed after the DVD failure, decided to develop a next-generation blue-laser-based digital video recorder (DVR), which would be positioned as DVD's high-density successor. Philips and Sony set up a joint task force, where Immink and his co-workers developed DVRs, later called Blu-ray's, code design. In 2005, seven years after its design, the Blu-ray Disc was brought to market. In 2002, the DVD forum adopted an alternative format, the HD DVD. The two resulting standards had significant differences that made each incompatible with the other. The blue-laser format war with Toshiba's HD DVD was settled in early 2008 when Toshiba withdrew their system effectively ending the high definition optical disc format war.

== DV and DCC ==
In 1985, Immink joined Philips's magnetic recording group, where he contributed to the design of coding technologies of the digital video tape recorder, DV and the Digital Compact Cassette (DCC). The DCC was short-lived: introduced in 1992 and discontinued in 1996. The DV, launched in 1994, has become a popular tape standard for home and semi-professional video production.

== Turing Machines ==
In 1994, Immink was named a Philips' Research Fellow, the company’s pre-eminent technical distinction. He left Philips Research in 1998 after 30 years of service. In 1999-2000, he was a distinguished visiting professor at Princeton University and the National University of Singapore. In 2001 he founded Turing Machines Inc., where he currently serves as its president. The small research institute has been successful in creating new coding technology, and has been granted around ten US patents after a joint cooperation with the Korean electronics company LG in 2002-2004.

== Service to engineering society ==
Immink has served in officer and board positions for a number of technical societies, government and academic organizations, including the Audio Engineering Society, IEEE, Society of Motion Picture and Television Engineers, and several universities. He is a trustee of the Shannon Foundation, and was a governor of the IEEE Consumer Electronics and Information Theory Societies. He was on the governors board of the Audio Engineering Society for over 10 years, and was its president in 2002–2003.

== Awards and honours ==
- IEEE Medal of Honor, for pioneering contributions to video, audio, and data recording technology, including compact disc, DVD, and Blu-ray, 2017
- Faraday Medal IET, 2015
- Lifetime achievement finalist, European Inventor Award, 2015
- Eduard Rhein Technology Award, for contributions to the theory and practice of channel codes that enable efficient and reliable optical recording, and creative contributions to digital recording technology awarded by the Eduard Rhein Foundation (Germany, 2014)
- Honorary doctorate (dr.h.c.) from the University of Johannesburg, in recognition of the remarkable contributions he has made to intellectual and public life (South Africa, 2014)
- Member Koninklijke Hollandsche Maatschappij der Wetenschappen, Haarlem, 2012
- IEEE Chester Sall Consumer Electronics Award, For DC-free Multimode Code Design Using Novel Selection Criteria for Optical Recording Systems, (co-recipient with Jun Lee), 2011
- Foreign Associate of the National Academy of Engineering (USA, 2007)
- SMPTE Progress Medal awarded by the Society of Motion Picture and Television Engineers, for the central role played in research and development of audio and video recording products (USA, 2004)
- IEEE Consumer Electronics Engineering Excellence Award (USA, 2004)
- Heyser Memorial lecturer awarded by the Audio Engineering Society (USA, May 2004)
- Technology and Engineering Emmy Award awarded by the National Television Academy, for coding technology for optical recording formats (USA, 2003)
- Inducted into the Consumer Electronics Hall of Fame (USA, 2003)
- Knight of the Order of Orange-Nassau (Netherlands, 2000)
- Honorary Member of the Netherlands Electronics and Radio Society (Netherlands, 2000)
- Millennium Medal awarded by the Institute of Electrical and Electronics Engineers (USA, 2000)
- AES Gold Medal awarded by the Audio Engineering Society, for significant contributions to the advancement of consumer audio technology (USA, 1999)
- IEEE Edison Medal, for a career of creative contributions to the technologies of digital video, audio, and data recording. (USA, 1999)
- Golden Jubilee Award for Technological Innovation awarded by the IEEE Information Theory Society, for the invention of constrained codes for commercial recording systems (USA, 1998)
- AES 50th Anniversary Commemorative Medal awarded by the Audio Engineering Society (USA, 1998)
- Member of the Royal Netherlands Academy of Arts and Sciences (Netherlands, 1996)
- Fellow of the Society of Motion Picture and Television Engineers (USA, 1996)
- IEEE Masaru Ibuka Consumer Electronics Award for pioneering contributions to consumer digital audio and video recording products (USA, 1996)
- Alexander M. Poniatoff Gold Medal Award for Technical Excellence awarded by the Society of Motion Picture and Television Engineers, for outstanding contributions to the development of new techniques and/or equipment that have contributed to the advancement of audio or video magnetic recording and reproduction (USA, 1994)
- Sir J.J. Thomson Medal awarded by the Institution of Electrical Engineers (IEE), 1993, for distinguished contributions to electronics.
- Fellow of the Institution of Electrical Engineers (FIEE) (United Kingdom, 1993)
- Chartered Engineer (CEng) (United Kingdom, 1993)
- AES Silver Medal awarded by the Audio Engineering Society, for major contributions to the development of digital audio recording systems (1992, USA)
- Fellow of the Institute of Electrical and Electronics Engineers, for contributions to optical laser recording and compact disc digital audio systems (1990, USA)
- Fellow of the Audio Engineering Society (1986, USA)

His papers have received several awards:

- 2009 Chester Sall Award for ‘’DC-free Multimode Code Design Using Novel Selection Criteria for Optical Recording Systems,’’ IEEE Transactions on Consumer Electronics (Co-recipient with Jun Lee).
- 2008 Best Paper Award for ‘’A general construction of constrained parity-check codes for optical recording,’’ 2008 IEEE Communications Society, Data Storage Technical Committee in Signal Processing and Coding for Data Storage (Co-recipient with Kui Cai) ).

== Selected literature ==
- Codes for mass data storage systems, Shannon Foundation Publishers, 2004 (three editions)
- Efficient balanced and maximum homopolymer-run restricted block codes for DNA-based data storage, IEEE Commun. Letters, 2019 (with Kui Cai) )
- Very efficient balanced codes, IEEE Journal Sel. Areas on Communications, 2010 (with Jos Weber).
- How we made the compact disc, Nature, 2018.
- Minimum Pearson Distance Detection for Multilevel Channels With Gain and/or Offset Mismatch, IEEE Trans. Information Theory, 2014 (with Jos Weber).
- A Survey of Coding Techniques for Optical Disc Recording, IEEE Journal Sel. Areas on Communications, 2001)
- Codes for Digital Recorders, IEEE Trans. Inform. Theory, 1998 (with Paul Siegel and Jack Wolf)
- Runlength-Limited Sequences, Proceedings IEEE, 1990)
- The Digital Versatile Disc (DVD): System Requirements and Channel Coding, SMPTE Journal, 1996.
- Experiments Toward an Erasable Compact Disc, (with J. Braat), J. Audio Eng. Soc., 1984.

== KHMW Schouhamer Immink Prijs ==
The Royal Holland Society of Arts and Sciences established the Kees Schouhamer Immink Prize in 2019 as a means to encourage research on information science and telecommunications, two basic pillars of our information society. The prize, consisting of an honorarium and a diploma, is bestowed in recognition of a distinguished PhD thesis defended in the Netherlands.

== Sources ==
- Codes for Mass Data Storage Systems, Second fully revised edition, Shannon Foundation Publishers, Eindhoven, The Netherlands, Nov. 2004. ISBN 90-74249-27-2
- The Compact Disc Story, AES Journal, pp. 458–465, May 1998 .
- The future of digital audio recording, AES Journal., pp. 171–172, 1999 .
- U.S. patent 4,501,000, EFM Patent, base code applied in Compact Disc, CD-R, MiniDisc
- U.S. patent 5,696,505, EFMPlus Patent, base code applied in DVD, DVD-RW, SACD
