= Kristoffer Zegers =

Dutch composer (born 1973)

- Born: 27 December 1973 (age 52); Netherlands
- Genres: Contemporary, Classical
- Occupation: Composer
- Instruments: Piano, Harpsichord
- Years active: 1997–present
- Label: BVhaast

Kristoffer Zegers (born 27 December 1973) is a Dutch composer.

== Life ==
Zegers was born in Breda, and was taught by Gilius van Bergeijk, Jan Boerman, Martijn Padding, Clarence Barlow, Diderik Wagenaar at the Royal Conservatory of The Hague.

== Career ==
In Zegers' music microtonal clusters are the main object. His music is about slow developments in clusters via glissandi. Because of that: his motto "Glissandéz mes enfants, Glissandéz toujours!" after César Franck: "Moduléz mes enfants, Moduléz toujours!".

Zegers most important work is Pianophasing, composition for 20 to 60 pianos. This work is played in the United Kingdom, Australia and several places in The Netherlands.

== Important works ==
- Pianophasing (2004) (Novembermusic the Netherlands)
- Pianophasing II (2009) (Huddersfield Contemporary Music Festival, England)
- Pianophasing III (2012) (the Soundstream Festival in Adelaide Australia)
