= Kees Teer =

Dutch electrical engineer (1925–2021)

Kees Teer (6 June 1925 – 18 January 2021) was a Dutch electrical engineer. He was director of the Philips Natuurkundig Laboratorium from 1968 until 1985.

== Career ==
Teer was born in Haarlem on 6 June 1925. He studied electrical engineering at Delft University of Technology and obtained his degree in 1949. On 1 September 1950 he started working for the Philips Natuurkundig Laboratorium as a scientific employee in the television division under dr. Haantjes. In 1959 he obtained his doctorate at Delft University of Technology with a thesis titled: "Some investigations on redundancy and possible bandwidth compression in television transmission". The same year he became research group leader of electroacoustics and magnetic registration at the Philips Natuurkundig Laboratorium.

In 1966 Teer was named deputy director of the Philips Natuurkundig Laboratorium and he became director in 1968. In this capacity he was responsible for all electronical systems. During his time as director there were major developments in the field of consumer electronics such as Video Cassette Recording and the compact disc, in which Philips played a large role. From 1982 to 1985 Teer was chief executive officer. He retired in 1985.

After his retirement Teer subsequently became member of the Scientific Council for Government Policy. In 1988 he was appointed professor in extraordinary service for research management at Delft University of Technology. At the privatization of the Koninklijke PTT Nederland in 1989 Teer became commissioner on the supervisory board.

In 1974 Teer was elected a Fellow of the Institute of Electrical and Electronics Engineers. He was elected a member of the Royal Netherlands Academy of Arts and Sciences in 1977.

Teer died in Amstelveen on 18 January 2021, aged 95.
