= Sinta Wullur =

- Born: 16 November 1958; Bandung, West Java, Indonesia
- Education: Conservatorium van Amsterdam; Royal Conservatory of The Hague
- Occupations: composer; gamelan musician; pianist; singer
- Notable work: Sita's Liberation (opera)
- Musical career
- Genres: classical music
- Instruments: gamelan; piano; vocal
- Years active: c. 1980th – present
- Formerly of: Irama, Multifoon, Tirta, Widosari

Sinta Wullur (born 16 November 1958) is an Indonesian-Dutch gamelan musician, pianist, singer, and classical composer.

== Biography ==
Sinta Wullur was born in Bandung, Indonesia, and emigrated to the Netherlands in 1968. Wullur studied music at the Sweelinck Conservatory with Willem Brons and received a degree in piano. She also studied composition with Ton de Leeuw at the same conservatory, and continued her studies in 1988 at the Royal Conservatory of The Hague with the composers Theo Loevendie and Louis Andriessen. She studied electronic music with Gilius van Bergeijk and Jan Boerman, and gamelan and singing with several teachers in Bali and Java. She received her degree in composition in 1991.

Wullur founded several gamelan groups in the Netherlands, including Tirta and Irama, and since 1992 has worked with the gamelan ensemble Widosari as a Javanese singer. She uses chromatically tuned gamelan instruments in her compositions and with her own gamelan ensemble Multifoon. Wullur has issued recordings on CD, including most recently Gong and Strings.

== Works ==
Wullur integrates Eastern and Western music in her compositions. Selected works include:

- Dreams and Fairy Tales
- Khayal, for piano and western chamber orchestra (written for the Indonesian pianist and composer Ananda Sukarlan), structures and ideas from gamelan and Indian music
- Ganatara, written for the Gamelan group Gending
- Kaleidoscope, written for the Gamelan group Gending
- 10 Bulls for gamelan instruments, Western percussion and song.
- Scenes from the Ramayana
- Sita Lost
- Mendung Indonesian
- Ramayana through Flashbacks, opera, libretto by Paul Goodman
- Sita's Liberation, gamelan opera for singers, narrator, dancers, wayang kulit, gamelan ensemble, string quartet, bass clarinet and full chorus
