= Pennings =

Pennings is a surname. Notable people with the surname include:

- Jeannette Pennings (born 1977), Dutch bobsledder, sister of Wilbert
- Steven Pennings, American biologist and biochemist
- Wilbert Pennings (born 1975), Dutch high-jumper

== See also ==
- Penning (disambiguation)
