= Pianophasing =

Pianophasing or Piano Phasing is a music work based on a vision of the work's composer, Kristoffer Zegers. Pianophasing is a work written for 30 to 100 pianos. This composition is going around the world and has been played in the United Kingdom, Huddersfield festival, Australia, Adelaide, the Soundstream festival, Seattle United States.

== Development ==
As a child, Zegers was fascinated by the rhythmic phases of church-bells, which never ring in time. When he began to compose, he noticed that even pieces of music with minimal rhythmical differences are sometimes subject to these phases. It is this 'weakness' (which often appears just by playing) that is the strongest element of Pianophasing, making rhythmical variations possible despite the piece being fully composed and notated. 50 pianists and 25 pianos come together in this large-scale performance. Pianophasing II has been played in the Huddersfield Contemporary Music Festival in England. Before this concert Pianophasing was played in the Novembermusic festival in the Netherlands. In March 2010 Pianophasing was shortlisted for the Royal Philharmonic Society Music Awards.
