= Gilles Holst =

Dutch physicist (1886–1968)

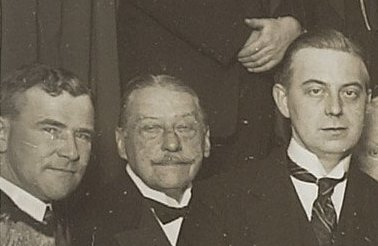
Gilles Holst (left), P. Teding van Berkhout and Balthasar van der Pol in 1925

Gilles Holst (20 March 1886 – 11 October 1968) was a Dutch physicist, known worldwide for his invention of the low-pressure sodium lamp in 1932.

== Early life ==
His father was a manager of a shipyard. In 1904 he went to ETH Zurich to study mechanical engineering, switching to mathematics and physics after a year.

== Career ==
He worked with Balthasar van der Pol, known for the Van der Pol oscillator, and Frans Michel Penning, known for Penning ionization and the Penning mixture. In 1908 he became a geprüfter Fachlehrer, or qualified teacher. And most important, he became the science director of the Philips Physics Laboratory in Eindhoven.

In 1909 he became an assistant to Heike Kamerlingh Onnes at Leiden University. At Leiden, it is believed that he was the first to witness the phenomenon of superconductivity. In 1926 he became a member of the Royal Netherlands Academy of Arts and Sciences.

The Gilles Holst Award was first awarded in 1939.

== Personal life ==
He died in the Netherlands at the age of 82.
