= Tom Dissevelt =

Dutch composer and musician

Thomas Dissevelt (4 March 1921 – 1989) was a Dutch composer and musician. He is known as a pioneer in the merging of electronic music and jazz. He married Rina Reys, sister of Rita Reys, in 1946.

Tom Dissevelt was also known as bassist/arranger of the Skymasters, and contributed to recordings by Rita Reys.

Between 1939 and 1944 Dissevelt studied at the Royal Conservatory of The Hague. He studied trombone for over three years, then went on to study clarinet, music theory and piano. Owing to schedule conflicts he discontinued his clarinet studies but later studied bass under the tutelage of Herman Stotijn of the Residentie Orchestra.

After World War II Dissevelt moved to Indonesia with the Jos Cleber Orchestra to work. In 1947 he went on an international tour with Wessel Ilcken, the husband of Rita Reys, and the orchestra of Piet van Dijk. This tour lasted three years and was particularly focussed on Spain and North Africa.

In 1955 Bep Rowold, leader of the Skymasters, hired Dissevelt as a bassist and arranger. Dissevelt became interested in twelve-tone serialism, listened to the many German radio stations, and heard works by Karlheinz Stockhausen and Anton Webern. Recommended by Philips in 1958, he was invited to Natlab, where together with Dick Raaijmakers, aka Kid Baltan, he composed and recorded electronic music. In 1957 Dissevelt and Raaijmakers released The Elektrosoniks: Electronic Music; in 1959 they released The Fascinating World of Electronic Music (Philips), which in 2003 David Bowie would deem one of his 25 all-time favorite albums. More of Dissevelt's compositions may be heard on the anthology album Popular Electronics: Early Dutch Electronic Music from Philips Research Laboratories, 1956–1963 (2004, Basta).

The emergence of pop music, along with such constitutional changes in the music industry as the disbandment of radio orchestras, compelled Dissevelt to give up orchestra work altogether. He then resolved to become an assistant to renowned Dutch entertainers such as Wim Sonneveld and Toon Hermans.
