= Dick Raaijmakers =

Dutch composer

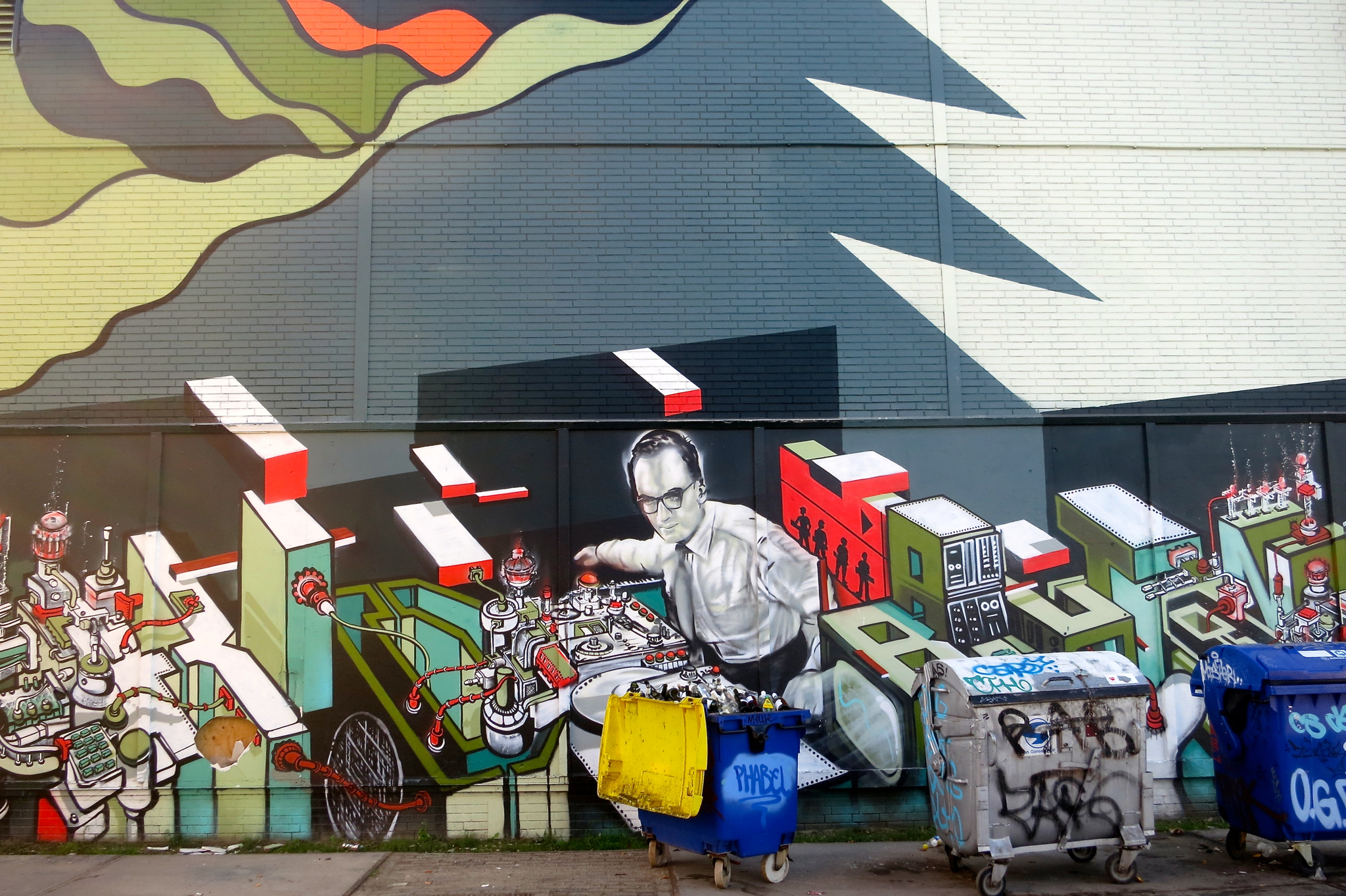
A mural of Raaijmakers in Eindhoven, Netherlands

Dick Raaijmakers (Maastricht, 1 September 1930 – The Hague, 4 September 2013), also known as Dick Raaymakers or Kid Baltan, was a Dutch composer, theater maker and theorist. He is considered a pioneer in the field of electronic music and tape music, but has also produced numerous musical theater pieces and theoretical publications.

Raaijmakers studied piano at the Royal Conservatory of The Hague. From 1954 to 1960, he worked at Koninklijke Philips Electronics N.V. in Eindhoven in the electro-acoustic field. Under the pseudonym Kid Baltan, a anadrome of "Dik Natlab" – Raaijmakers' nickname, he realized three tests of popular music with the help of electronic means. This work has been collected and re-released under the name Popular Electronics. Early Dutch electronic music from Philips Research Laboratories, 1956-1963. From 1960 to 1962, he was affiliated with the University of Utrecht as a researcher. From 1963 to 1966, he worked with Jan Boerman in a self-established studio for electronic music in The Hague. From 1966 until his retirement in 1995, he worked as a teacher of Electronic and Contemporary Music at the Royal Conservatory (The Hague) and from 1991 as a teacher of music theater at the interfaculty Image and Sound (later renamed to ArtScience, and at the Royal Academy of Fine Arts (Antwerp).

== Biography and works ==
Raaijmakers was born as Bernardus Franciscus Raaijmakers in Maastricht and studied the piano at the Royal Conservatory of The Hague. From 1954 to 1960, he worked in the field of electro-acoustic research at the NatLab of Royal Philips Electronics Ltd. in Eindhoven. Using the alias Kid Baltan (Dik NatLab reversed), he and Tom Dissevelt formed Electrosoniks and produced some of the first electronic pop music. The most important LP of these two artists is The Fascinating World Of Electronic Music published in Netherlands in 1959. Two years before, one of the tracks on the album (Song of the 2nd Moon) was published separately. Nine years later was the launch of the US version of the LP entitled Song Of The Second Moon. Jean-Jacques Perrey visited them at the time and cited them as an inspiration.

From 1960 to 1962, he held an appointment as scientific staff member at the University of Utrecht.

From 1963 to 1966, he collaborated with Jan Boerman in his own studio for electronic music in the Hague. He was one of the co-founders of STEIM, the STudio for Electro-Instrumental Music.

In 1966, he founded the electronic music studio at the Royal Conservatory of the Hague and lectured on electronic and contemporary music until his retirement in 1995.

From 1991, he taught music theatre at the Image and Sound Interfaculty at the same conservatory.

He died on 3 September 2013.

His archives are preserved at the Netherlands Music Institute. Raaijmakers studied at the Koninklijk Conservatorium The Hague until 1953. From 1954 to 1960, he worked at Philips in the field of electroacoustics, after which he was a research assistant at the Rijksuniversiteit te Utrecht until 1962.

From 1963 to 1966, he ran a studio for electroacoustic music in The Hague with Jan Boerman.

Until 1995, he taught electronic music, from 1991 electronic music for musical theater at the Koninklijk Conservatorium in The Hague.

In the early 1960s, Raaijmakers composed a number of electroacoustic works such as Vijf canons, Flux and Plumes.

Between 1967 and 1972, he created "photokinetic objects", which were exhibited in the Stedelijk Museum in Amsterdam in 1971 and in the Gemeentemuseum The Hague in 1972. De grafische methode tractor was created in 1976 and De grafische methode fiets in 1979, two pieces based on the work of film pioneer Etienne-Jules Marey.

In 1977, the audiovisual production Mao leve! Was born. Between 1981 and 1984 Raaijmakers created a series of productions for tape, film, theater and percussion ensemble that revolved around the film Night Owls by Laurel and Hardy (Shhh !, The Microman, The Soundman, The Soundwall, Ow! And Come on!) . The series for which Raaijmakers composed the music was performed at the 1984 Holland Festival.

In 1983, Ping-Pong was created, a stereo radio production about a table tennis game between Louis Andriessen and Cornelis de Bondt. The following year, Ecstasy (in memoriam Josine van Droffelaar) was performed, for which Raaijmakers received the Matthijs Vermeulenprijs.

In 1985, he designed a neon sculpture for the new building of the Groningen City Conservatory.

In the 1990s, a series of works for music theater was created: Intona (1991), Dépons / Der Fall (1992), The happy hand / open (1993), Der Fall / Dépons (1993), De promenoir van Mondriaan, (1994 ), De val van Mussolini (1995) and Scheuer im Haag (1995). Raaijmakers' oeuvre covers a wide variety of genres and styles, varying from sound animations for films to extremely abstract pulse structures, from "action music" to infinite voice patterns, from electro-acoustic tableaux vivants to extracts of music theatre. He is considered as someone who combines disciplines such as visual art, film, literature and theatre with the world of music. Raaijmakers has created numerous electronic compositions, "instructional pieces" for string ensembles, phono-kinetic objects, "graphic methods" for tractor and bicycle, "operations" for tape, film, theatre, percussion ensemble, museum and performance, artworks for offices and conservatory, and many soundscape compositions and music theatre productions, including some for the Holland Festival and for theatre company Hollandia. His theoretical essays are evidence of his profound interest in special inter-media connections. For instance, in his latest publication Cahier M (2000) Raaijmakers elaborated upon the connections he saw between the 19th-century French physiologist Étienne-Jules Marey, composer Pierre Boulez, architect Iannis Xenakis and the musical views of Piet Mondrian. One of his most important books is The Method (1985), in which he describes in an exact but also poetic way how motion, cause and effect and their perception are interrelated.After obtaining a diploma in radio technique, he decided to deepen his theoretical knowledge and was particularly interested in mathematics, physics and acoustics. Under the name Kid Baltan, he released several records considered to be the first Dutch electronic music, pioneering popular electronic music, in particular the LP the Kid Baltan from 1957. He never stopped exploring the links between scientific research and artistic creativity. Founder of Dutch electronic music, he built bridges between contemporary music and the work of the French physiologist Étienne-Jules Marey. For example, he is the designer of a mechanism called De grafische methode fiets ( The Graphic Method: Bicyclette The Graphic Method is the name of a work by Marey.), composed of a kind of bicycle accompanied by a complex system of sensors placed on its actuator, and which aims to reproduce in sound form, on the scale of the auditorium, the efforts of the latter (tension muscle, shortness of breath, heartbeat etc.). Designed in 1979, the instrument was exhibited throughout the month of November 2008 at the Huddersfield Contemporary Music Festival, UK. He created other similar instruments but of much larger size, in particular in the context of the play De val van Mussolini (La Chute de Mussolini , 1995).

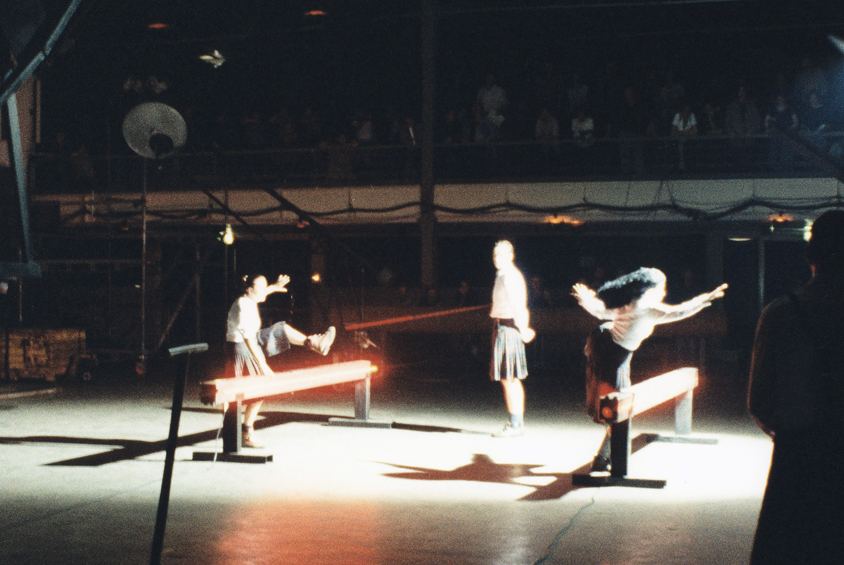
Performance of The Fall of Mussolini, Westergasfabriek, Amsterdam, May–June 1995

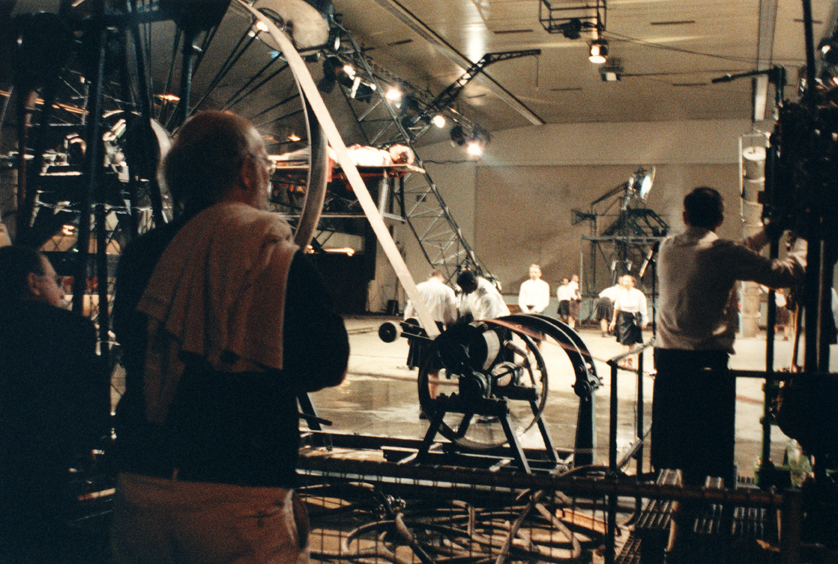
Performance of The Fall of Mussolini, Westergasfabriek, Amsterdam, May–June 1995

== Awards ==
Raaijmakers received several awards for his contribution to the development of visual arts and music in the Netherlands:

- In 1992, from the Foundation for Lifetime Achievement Awards for Visual Arts, Design and Architecture (BKBV).
- In 1985 and 1994, the Matthijs Vermeulen Award.
- In 1995, the Ouborg Award for his lifetime achievements from the City of The Hague.
- In late 1995, the biennial "Festival in de Branding" was dedicated exclusively to Raaijmakers' musical and visual work. The 2014–2015 season of the festival will once again be dedicated to him.
- In 2004, he received a lifetime achievement award from the Johan Wagenaar Foundation and an honorary doctorate from the University of Leiden.
- In November 2011, Raaymakers received the Witteveen+Bos Award for Art+Technology for his entire oeuvre.

== Oeuvre ==
=== Music theatre productions and works of art ===
- The Art of Opening an Exhibition (1966)
- Radioproject (1966–1967) Radio Project
- Balade Erlkönig (1967) Erlkönig Ballad
- Grafisch kwartet (1968) Graphic Quartet
- Kwartet (1971) Quartet
- Kwartet heiliger Dankgesang (2000) Quartett heiliger Dankgesang
- Nachtmuziek (1969) Night Music
- Schaakmuziek (1969) Chess Music
- Ideofoon 1 (1970–1973) Ideophone 1
- Ideofoon 2 (1970–1973) Ideophone 2
- Ideofoon 3 (1970–1973) Ideophone 3
- Chairman Mao Is Our Guide (1970)
- De lange mars (1971) The Long March
- Mao leve! (1977) May Mao Live!
- Kwintet (1972–1976) Quintet
- Actio in distans (1977)
- De grafische methode tractor (1976) The Graphic Method Tractor
- De grafische methode fiets (1979) The Graphic Method Bicycle
- De kunst van het machinelezen (1978) The Art of Reading Machines
- Shhh! (1981)
- The Microman (1982)
- Ow! (1983–1984)
- Soundmen (1984)
- Come On! (1984)
- The Soundwall (1982–1984)
- Hey-hey! (1990) Hey-Hey!
- Ping-pong (1983–1996) Ping Pong
- Extase (1984) Extacy
- Acht labielen (1984–1985) Eight Labiles
- Scheuermachine (1985) Scheuer Machine
- Der Stein (1995)
- Scheuer im Haag (1995)
- Tombeau de Glenn Gould (1989)
- Der Fall Leiermann (1991)
- Dépons/Der Fall (1992)
- Der Fall/Dépons (1993)
- Intona (1991)
- Fort-klank (1993) Fort Sound
- Probe (1993)
- De val van Mussolini (1995) The Fall of Mussolini
- Hermans hand (1995) Hermans Hand
- Volta (1995)
- Konzert für ... (1997–2000) Concert for ...
- Proefneming met een tabakspijp (1998–1999) Experiment with a Tobacco Pipe
- De weergave (2000) The Rendition
- Ritueel moment (2005) Ritual Moment

=== Compositions ===
- Song of the Second Moon (1957)
- Tweeklank (1959) Contrast
- Pianoforte (1960)
- Vijf Plastieken (1961) Five Sculptures
- Canon-1, super augere (1964)
- Canon-2, super imprimere (1964)
- Canon-3, super addere (1965)
- Canon-4, super sub-trahere (1965/66)
- Canon-5, super ‘dis-moi …’ (1967)
- Ballade Erlkönig voor Luidsprekers (1967) Erlkönig Ballad for Loudspeakers
- Filmmuziek-1: Mechanical Motions (1960)
- Filmmuziek-2: Bekaert (1966)
- Filmmuziek-3: Sidmar (1969)
- Chairman Mao Is Our Guide (1970)
- De lange mars (1971) The Long March
- Mao Leve! (1977) May Mao Live!
- Ach! Ach! (1987) My! My!
- Plumes (1967)
- Flux (1967)
- Lied van de Arbeid (1976) Ode to Labor
- Kwartet (1971) Quartet
- Ping-pong (1983) Ping Pong
- Der Fall Leiermann (1991)
- Du Armer! (1993)
- Vier Fanfares (1995) Four Fanfares

=== Selected publications ===
- Raaijmakers, Dick (2000). Cahier 'M': A Brief Morphology of Electric Sound. Collected Writings of the Orpheus Institute Series. Leuven University Press. ISBN 9789058670762.
- Raaijmakers, Dick (2009). Method. Edited and translated by Vincent W.J. van Gerven Oei. Eindhoven: Onomatopee. ISBN 978-90-78454-35-9.
- Raaijmakers, Dick (2010). The Destructive Character. Edited and translated by Vincent W.J. van Gerven Oei. Eindhoven: Onomatopee. ISBN 9789078454663.

=== Discography ===
Much of his early work has been re-issued on the Basta label:

- The Fascinating World of Electronic Music by Kid Baltan and Tom Dissevelt (1959)
- Song of the Second Moon: The Sonic Vibrations of Tom Dissevelt & Kid Baltan (1968)
- Dick Raaijmakers - Complete Tape Music - 3 CD box, Basta #3091 562
- Tom Dissevelt, Kid Baltan, Henk Badings and Dick Raaijmakers - Popular Electronics. Early Dutch Electronic Music from Philips Research Laboratories 1956-1963 - 4 CD box, Basta #3091 412
