= Penning ionization =

Ionization process

Penning ionization is a form of chemi-ionization, an ionization process involving reactions between neutral atoms or molecules. The Penning effect is put to practical use in applications such as gas-discharge neon lamps and fluorescent lamps, where the lamp is filled with a Penning mixture to improve the electrical characteristics of the lamps.

== History ==
The process is named after the Dutch physicist Frans Michel Penning who first reported it in 1927. Penning started to work at the Philips Natuurkundig Laboratorium at Eindhoven to continue the investigation of electric discharge on rare gases. Later, he started measurements on the liberation of electrons from metal surfaces by positive ions and metastable atoms, and especially on the effects related to ionization by metastable atoms.

== Reaction ==
Penning ionization refers to the interaction between an electronically excited gas-phase atom G^{*} and a target molecule M. The collision results in the ionization of the molecule yielding a cation M^{+●}, an electron e^{−}, and a neutral gas molecule, G, in the ground state. Penning ionization occurs via formation of a high energy collision complex, evolving toward the formation of a cationic species, by ejecting a high energy electron.

$$\ce{G^\ast{} + M{} \longrightarrow M^{+\bullet}{} + {e^-} + G{}}$$

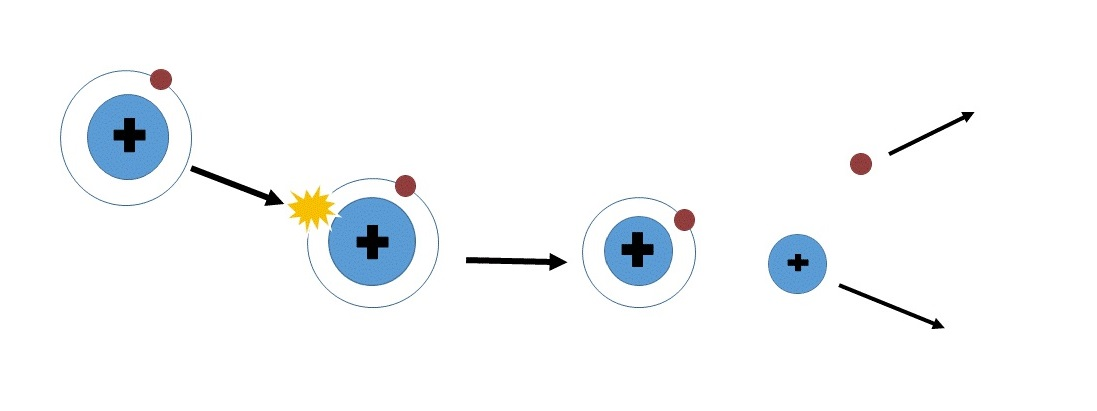
The process of ionization interaction between excited molecule and target molecule.

Penning ionization occurs when the target molecule has an ionization potential lower than the excited energy of the excited-state atom or molecule.

== Variants ==
When the total electron excitation energy of colliding particles is sufficient, then the bonding energy of two particles that bonded together can also be contributed into the associative penning ionization act. Associative Penning ionization can also occur:

$$\ce{G^\ast{} + M{} \longrightarrow MG^{+\bullet}{} + e^-{}}$$

Surface Penning ionization (Auger Deexcitation) refers to the interaction of the excited-state gas with a surface S, resulting in the release of an electron:

$$\ce{G^\ast{} + S{} \longrightarrow G{} + S{} + e^-{}}$$

The positive charge symbol $\ce{S+}$ that would appear to be required for charge conservation is omitted, because S is a macroscopic surface and the loss of one electron has a negligible effect.

== Applications ==
=== Electron spectroscopy ===
Penning ionization has been applied to Penning ionization electron spectroscopy (PIES) for gas chromatography detector in glow discharge by using the reaction for He^{*} or Ne^{*}. The kinetic energy of electron ejected is analyzed by the collisions between target (gas or solid) and metastable atoms by scanning the retarding field in a flight tube of the analyzer in the presence of a weak magnetic field. The electron produced by reaction has a kinetic energy E determined by:

$$E = E_\text{m} + IE$$

The Penning ionization electron energy does not depend on the conditions of the experiments or any other species since both E_{m} and IE are atomic or molecular constants of the energy of He^{*} and the ionization energy for the species. Penning ionization electron spectroscopy applied to organic solids. It enables the study of local electron distribution of individual molecular orbitals, which exposes to the outside of the outermost surface layers.

=== Mass spectrometry ===
Multiple mass spectrometric techniques, including glow discharge mass spectrometry and direct analysis in real time mass spectrometry rely on Penning ionization.

Glow discharge mass spectrometry is the direct determination of trace element in solid samples. It occurs with two ionization mechanisms: the direct electron impact ionization and Penning ionization. Processes inherent to the glow discharge, namely cathodic sputtering coupled with Penning ionization, yield an ion population from which semi-quantitative results can be directly obtained.

== See also ==
- Chemical ionization
