= Super Density Disc =

The SD logo for the Super Density Disc. This logo was later repurposed for the SD memory card, but with the design retaining its optical disc origins.

Super Density Disc (abbreviated as SD) was a digital video optical disc format (a precursor to DVD) proposed in 1995. Its logo, which contained an image of an optical disc, remained of interest in the late 2010s as it was "paradoxically" reused for SD memory card.

== Development ==
Seven companies — Toshiba, Time Warner, Matsushita Electric (now Panasonic), Hitachi, Pioneer, Thomson (now Vantiva), and JVC — initially joined together to develop the Super Density Disc. They were set to potentially enter into a format war with Sony and Philips, who were developing the competing MultiMedia Compact Disc (MMCD) at that time. However, on 3 May 1995 an ad hoc industry group comprising IBM, Apple, Compaq, Hewlett-Packard, and Microsoft stated that it would only accept one video disc standard going forward. This pressure convinced both sides to agree to integrate some of the technologies from the MMCD and SD standards to ultimately create the DVD.

== Characteristics ==
The format was double sided and consisted of two layers, each of 0.6mm in thickness, laminated together with each side having a 5 GB capacity. The specification for the SD disc's single layer was ultimately adopted as part of the DVD specification, but combined with the MMCD's single-sided, dual layer arrangement.

Toshiba announced a prototype SD-ROM drive in November of 1995. The drive had an advertised 1.35 MB/sec. sustained data transfer rate, similar to that of the later DVD standard, and burst rates of up to 11.1 MB/sec. via Parallel ATA or 5 MB/sec. under SCSI synchronous mode or 4 MB/sec in asynchronous mode.

== Logo Reuse ==
The SD logo was later repurposed by Phillips and Toshiba for the Secure Digital memory card which they were jointly developing. While the SD memory card is a flash memory device, the logo still references its optical disc origins.

== Sources ==
- Volmar, Axel; Jancovic, Marek; Schneider, Alexandra (2019). "Format Matters: An Introduction to Format Studies". In Jancovic, Marek; Volmar, Axel; Schneider, Alexandra (eds.). Format Matters: Standards, Practices, and Politics in Media Cultures. Lüneburg: meson press. p. 13. doi:10.14619/1556. ISBN 978-3-95796-155-6.
