= Chemi-ionization =

Ionization from excited state bonding

Chemi-ionization is the formation of an ion through the reaction of a gas phase atom or molecule with another atom or molecule when the collision energy is below the energy required to ionize the reagents. The reaction may involve a reagent in an excited state or may result in the formation of a new chemical bond. Chemi-ionization can proceed through the Penning, associative, dissociative or rearrangement ionization reactions. Includes reactions that produce a free electron or a pair of ions (positive and negative).

This process is helpful in mass spectrometry because it creates unique bands that can be used to identify molecules. This process is extremely common in nature as it is considered the primary initial reaction in flames.

== Definitions ==
In the literature, the term "chemi-ionization" is used inconsistently. Berry broadly defined chemi-ionization as "processes that lead to the formation of free charges, electrons and ions under the conditions of chemical reactions". Fontijn defined chemi-ionization more narrowly as reactions "in which the number of elementary charge carriers is increased as a direct result of the formation of new chemical bonds". Fontijn explicitly specified that the number of charge carriers increases, but Berry's definition includes the Penning ionization. In the 1977 review of ionization in collisions of atomic particles at low kinetic energies, Leonas and Kalinin stated that the ionization processes in which collisional energies are below the ionization potentials are called chemi-ionization processes.

The IUPAC defined chemi-ionization in the context of mass spectrometry as "ionization of an atom or molecule by interaction with another internally excited atom or molecule". The IUPAC definition includes only reactions that involve an atom or a molecule in an excited state. Also, IUPAC mentioned that chemi-ionization includes reactions in which chemical bonds are not changed. The older IUPAC definition (1973) didn't require the interaction to be with an atom or a molecule in an excited state, but mentioned that it is generally excited. Also, the older definition stated that the ionization is the result of a collision, while the new definition refers to the ionization of one of the interacting species.

== Energy requirements ==
A certain amount of energy, which may be large enough, is required to remove an electron from an atom or a molecule in its ground state. In chemi-ionization processes, the energy consumed by the ionization must be stored in atoms or molecules in a form of potencial energy or can be obtained from an accompanying exothermic chemical change (for example, from a formation of a new chemical bond). In atoms or molecules, the energy can be stored in the form of an excited state. In molecules, it can alternatively be stored in the form of vibrational excitation. In exothermic chemical reactions, the released energy can be acquired by the molecule in the form of internal vibrational excitation and then cause ionization if the released energy is large enough.

== Reactions ==
Chemi-ionization reactions include:

$$\ce{A^\ast{} + B{} -> A{} + B^{+}{} + e^{-}{} (Penning\ ionization)}$$
$$\ce{A{} + B{} -> AB^{+}{} + e^{-}{} (associative\ ionization)}$$
$$\ce{A{} + B{} -> A^{+}{} + B^{-}{} (ionization\ by\ electron\ transfer)}$$
$$\ce{A{} + BC{} -> AB^{+}{} + C{} + e^{-}{} (rearrangement\ ionization)}$$
$$\ce{A{} + BC{} -> A{} + B{} + C^{+}{} + e^{-}{} (dissociative\ ionization)}$$

=== Reactions involving a reagent in an excited state ===
Chemi-ionization can be represented by

$$\ce{G^\ast{} + M -> M^{+\bullet}{} + e^-{} + G}$$

where G is the excited state species (indicated by the super-scripted asterisk), and M is the species that is ionized by the loss of an electron to form the radical cation (indicated by the super-scripted "plus-dot").

== Astrophysical implications ==
Chemi-ionization has been postulated to occur in the hydrogen rich atmospheres surrounding stars. This type of reaction would lead to many more excited hydrogen atoms than some models account for. This affects our ability to determine the proper optical qualities of solar atmospheres with modeling.

== In flames ==
The most common example of chemi-ionization occurs in hydrocarbon flame. The reaction can be represented as

$\ce{O + CH -> HCO+ + e^-}$

This reaction is present in any hydrocarbon flame and can account for deviation in the amount of expected ions from thermodynamic equilibrium.

== History ==
The term chemi-ionization was coined by Hartwell F. Calcote in 1948 in the Third Symposium on Combustion and Flame, and Explosion Phenomena. The Symposium performed much of the early investigation into this phenomenon in the 1950s. The majority of the research on this topic was performed in the 1960s and '70s. It is currently seen in many different ionization techniques used for mass spectrometry.

== See also ==
- Penning ionization
- Associative ionization
- Charge-exchange ionization
- Auger effect

== Bibliography ==
- V. B. Leonas; A. P. Kalinin (April 1977). "Study of ionization in slow collisions of atomic particles". Soviet Physics Uspekhi. 20 (4): 561–592. doi:10.1070/PU1977V020N04ABEH005382. Wikidata Q125875406.
- A. N. Klucharev (30 June 1993). "Chemi-ionization processes". Physics-Uspekhi. 36 (6): 486–512. doi:10.1070/PU1993V036N06ABEH002162. ISSN 1063-7869. Wikidata Q56226700.
