= Penning mixture =

Mixture of gases used in electric lighting

A Penning mixture is a mixture of gases that is used in electric gas-discharge lamps, consisting of one inert gas with a minute amount of another gas that has lower ionization voltage than the main constituent. It is named after Frans Michel Penning.

The neon lighting and neon lamps and displays are filled not with pure neon, but with a Penning mixture.

== Explanation ==
The other gas, called a quenching gas, has to have a lower ionization energy than the first excited state of the noble gas. The energy of the excited, but neutral, noble gas atoms then can ionize the quench gas particles by energy transfer via collisions; known as the Penning effect.

A very common Penning mixture of about 98–99.5% of neon with 0.5–2% argon is used in some neon lamps, especially those rated for 120 volts. The mixture is easier to ionize than either neon or argon alone, and lowers the breakdown voltage at which the tube becomes conductive and starts producing light. The optimal level of argon is about 0.25%, but some of it gets adsorbed onto the borosilicate glass used for the tubes, so higher concentrations are used to take the losses into account; higher argon content is used in higher-power tubes, as hotter glass adsorbs more argon. The argon changes the color of the "neon light", making it slightly more yellowish. The neon gas used in some nixie tubes includes a small amount of mercury vapor (for various reasons), which glows blue.

A Penning mixture of neon and argon is also used as a starter gas in sodium vapor lamps, where it is responsible for the faint pinkish glow before the sodium emission begins.

The Penning mixture used in plasma displays is usually helium or neon with small percentage of xenon, at several hundred torr.

Penning mixtures with the formulas of argon–xenon, neon–argon, argon–acetylene, and xenon–TMA are used as filler gases in gaseous ionization detectors.

Other kinds of Penning mixture include helium–xenon.

== See also ==
- Geiger–Müller tube
- Paschen's law
