= Philips Natuurkundig Laboratorium =

Research laboratory of Philips (NatLab)

Coordinates: 51°24′38″N 5°27′25″E

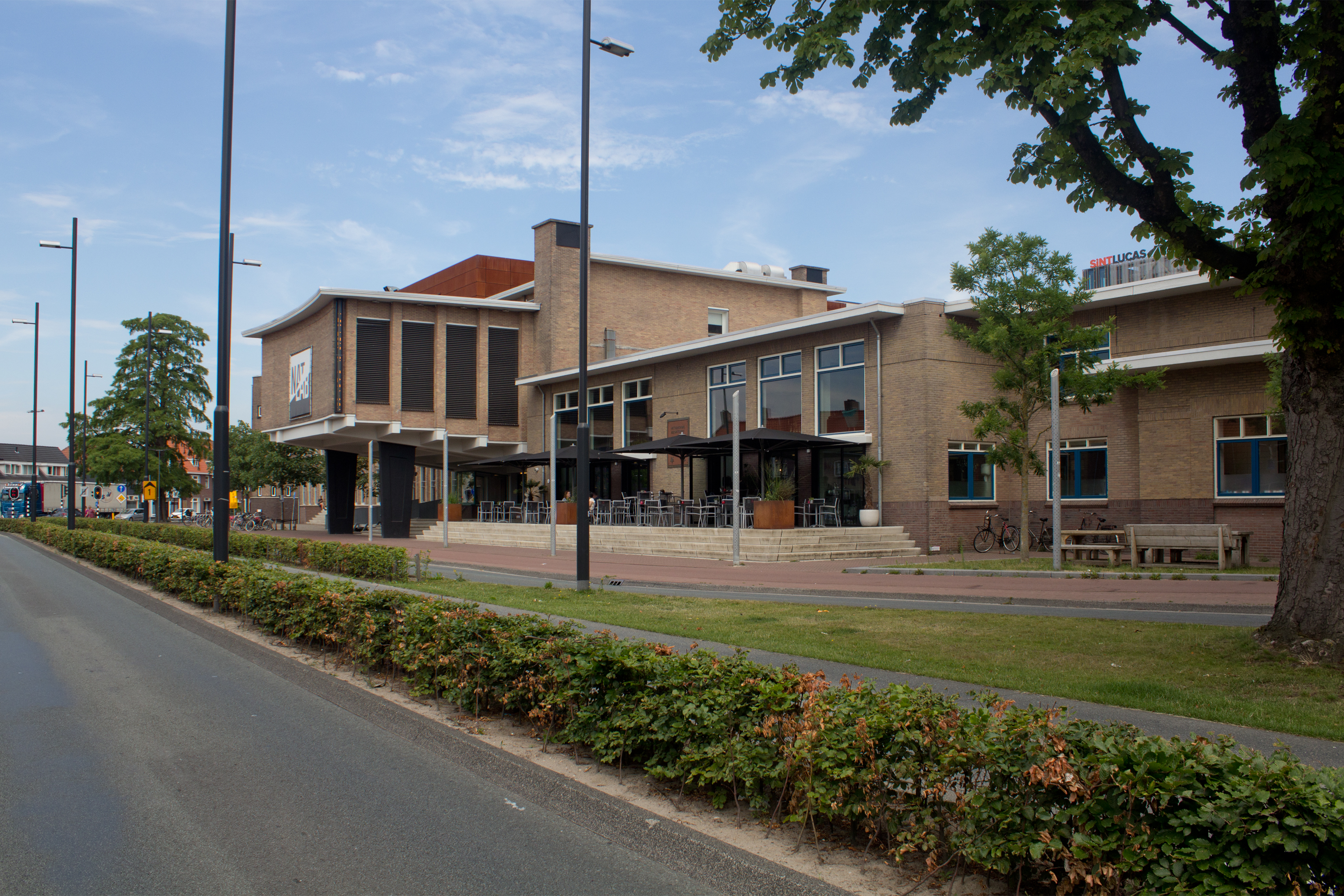
Philips Natuurkundig Laboratorium, NatLab, Eindhoven, converted to a film theater and café-restaurant in 2013.

The Philips Natuurkundig Laboratorium (English translation: Philips Physics Laboratory) or NatLab was the Dutch section of the Philips research department, which did research for the product divisions of that company.

In 1975, the NatLab employed some 2000 people, including 600 researchers with university degrees. Research done at the NatLab has ranged from product-specific to fundamental research into electronics, physics and chemistry, as well as computing science and information technology.

Originally located in the Strijp district of Eindhoven, the facility moved to Waalre in the early 1960s. A 1972 municipal rezoning meant the area became part of the Eindhoven municipality again, which was followed some years later by Eindhoven renaming the campus' main street into the Prof. Holstlaan, after the first director.

The NatLab facility was disbanded in 2001 and the area has been transformed into the commercial High Tech Campus Eindhoven, which is open to researchers from many different companies. Philips Research is after many reorganizations one of the smaller tenants. Philips Research also had branches in Germany, the United Kingdom, United States, India and China.

== History ==
The history of the NatLab spans roughly three periods: 1914–1946, 1946–1972 and 1972–2001.

=== The start: 1914-1946 ===
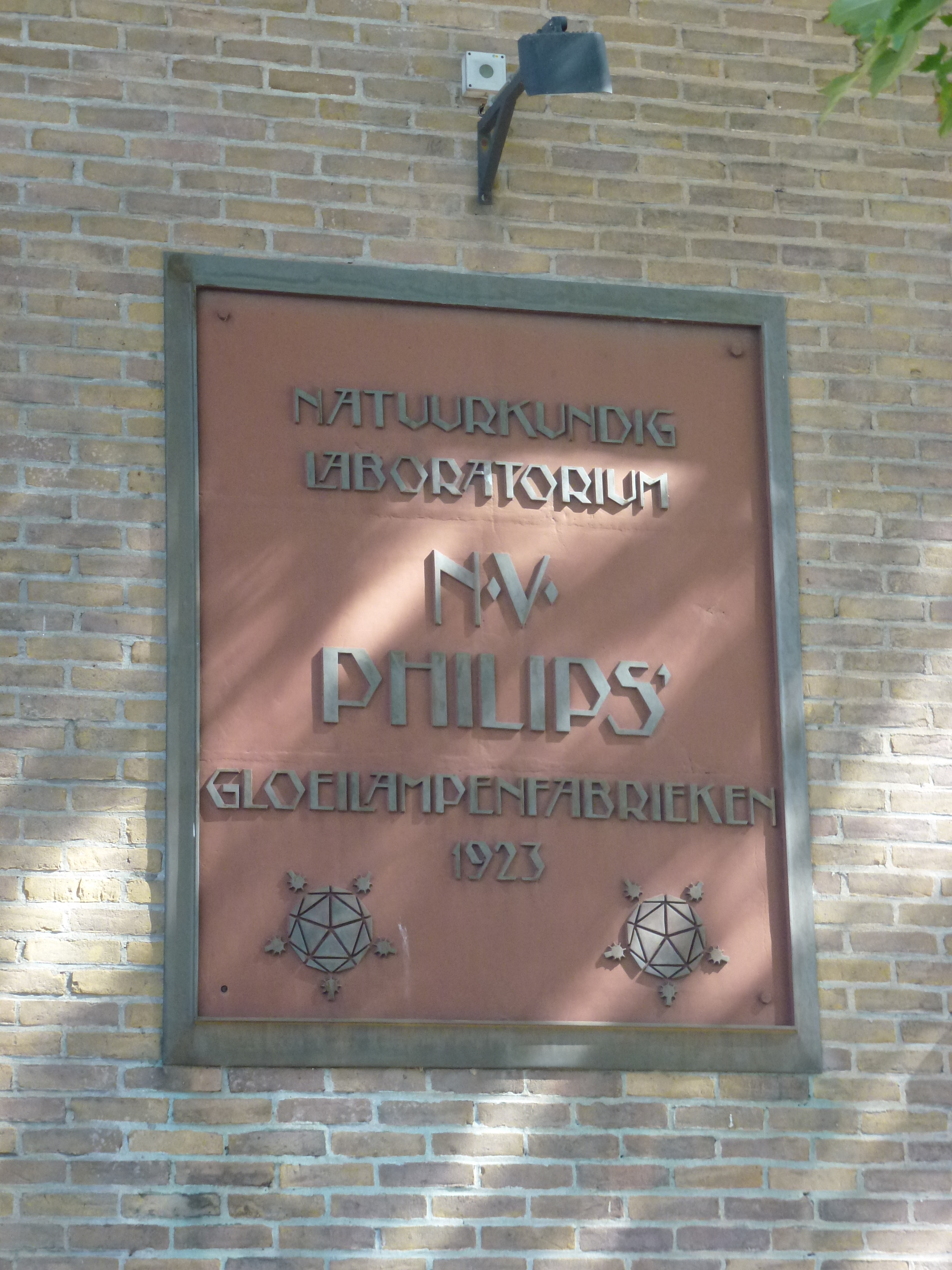
NatLab gevelplaquette

The NatLab was founded in 1914 after a direct decision of Gerard and Anton Philips. At the time Philips was branching out into different areas of electronics and they felt the need to do in-house research to support product development, as well as create a company patent portfolio and reduce the company dependence on patents held by third parties. They hired physicist Gilles Holst (the first director) who assembled a staff consisting of Ekko Oosterhuis and a small number of research assistants; this was the entire scientific staff of the facility for the first decade. Holst held the director's position until 1946 and spent his tenure creating and maintaining an academic atmosphere at the facility in which researchers had intellectual freedom and access to external research and resources. The external access also included colloquia by some of the great physicists of the day (including Albert Einstein in 1923).

This managerial philosophy was unique to NatLab, compared to other Philips facilities and laboratories. Unlike the other Philips labs, NatLab similar to AT&T Bell Laboratories in the United States. The research was also not limited to industrial research; a good deal of fundamental research was also performed at NatLab, such as that of Bernard D. H. Tellegen and Balthasar van der Pol. Van der Pol was hired in 1922 to start a research program into radio technology. This research program resulted in publishable results in the areas of propagation of radio waves, electrical circuit theory, harmonics and a number of related, mathematical problems. Van der Pol also studied the effect of the curvature of the Earth on radio wave propagation.

Van der Pol's senior assistant (hired in 1923) was Bernard Tellegen. He started working on triodes and invented (with his director Gilles Holst) the penthode in 1926. The penthode was the centerpiece of the famous Philips radio and it soon found its way into every radio and amplifier in the market. Tellegen also did pioneering research in the area of electrical networks. In 1925 Van der Pol took on a junior student from Delft, Johan Numans. Numans designed and built a short wave crystal controlled telephony transmitter for his required period of practical work, with call sign PCJJ. This transmitter made world headlines on March 11, 1927 when it transmitted practically undistorted music and voice across the entire globe. As a result of this, the Philips Omroep Holland-Indië (PHOHI, the Philips Holland-Indonesia station) was founded.

=== Growth and success: 1946-1972 ===
In 1946 Holst was succeeded by a triumvirate: physicist Hendrik Casimir (who would later become the primarily responsible of the three and member of the Board of Directors), chemist Evert Verwey and engineer Herre Rinia. The NatLab saw its heyday under this triumvirate.

For the Philips company as a whole, the era of Frits Philips had made the company part of the world's electronics giants with 350.000 employees in 1970. NatLab grew right along with the company and became a world class research facility. By 1963 a new campus was designed for the facility in Waalre, with space for 3.000 employees (more than any Dutch university). NatLab never grew to quite those numbers though, 2.400 was the record – and that included the foreign branches which had been added in the meantime. The NatLab became a superuniversity where the "best of the best" could do research in practically perfect circumstances (full academic freedom, no time devoted to teaching classes, nearly unlimited budgets and so on). Kees Schouhamer Immink, digital pioneer and one of NatLab's top-scientists, formulated the atmosphere at that time: "We were able to conduct whatever research we found relevant, and had no pre-determined tasks; instead, we received full freedom and support of autonomous research. We went to work, not knowing what we would do that day. This view -or rather ambiguous view- on how research should be conducted, led to amazing inventions as a result. It was an innovation heaven". In 1968 Kees Teer became director.

The result was a slew of commercial and fundamental results, including the Plumbicon camera tube and the Video Long Play disc, which was the technological basis for the 1980 compact disc. Results were also achieved in the area of integrated circuitry: Else Kooi invented the LOCOS technology and Kees Hart and Arie Slob developed the I²L (Integrated Injection Logic) in the early 1970s.

Dick Raaijmakers (under the alias "Kid Baltan", "Baltan" being "Natlab" spelled backwards) and Tom Dissevelt's work at the Natlab studios resulted in internationally acclaimed electronic music and jazz music.

=== The end: 1972-2012 ===
The period under Casimir was a time of great success and achievement for the NatLab. But the time after his retirement in 1972 was one of decline and loss.

In 1973, starting with the oil crisis, the long period of economic growth came to an end and companies could no longer afford expensive research departments. With that economic reality, the belief in the stimulating value of fundamental research also seemed to disappear. On top of that, a number of bad decisions by the NatLab management did little to ingratiate the facility to the Philips Board of Directors (such bad decisions including the development of the flopped videodisc and the initial lack of support for the compact disc).

The compact disc had been initiated and pushed by the audio department, although NatLab researcher Kees Schouhamer Immink played an instrumental role in its design. For the industry group 'Audio' and the NatLab the development of a small optical audio disc started early in 1974. The sound quality of this disc had to be superior to that of the large and vulnerable vinyl record. To realize this, Lou Ottens, technical director of 'Audio', formed a seven-person project group. Vries and Diepeveen were members of this project group. In March 1974, during an Audio-VLP meeting Peek and Vries recommended a digital audio registration because an error-correcting code could be included. Vries and Diepeveen built an error-correcting coder-decoder that was delivered in the summer of 1978. The decoder was included in the CD prototype player that was presented to the international press. The protoype was not yet ready for market launch. Its maximum playing time of 60 minutes and 14-bit audio quality did not meet the required marketing specifications. In addition, the discs were susceptible to scratches causing track loss. These limitations had to be overcome before the CD player could be introduced to the market. The error-correcting coder-decoder was abandoned in 1979 in favor of Sony’s superior CIRC code, which became the adopted CD's standard. After a lot of experimentation, Kees Schouhamer Immink improved the playing time by thirty percent by inventing a code that could better cope with the servo systems. The encoding system Immink devised came to be called eight-to-fourteen modulation (EFM). To commemorate this breakthrough, Philips received an IEEE Milestone Award on March 6, 2009. This breakthrough was also appreciated by Sony and they started a cooperation with Philips that resulted in June 1980 in a common CD system standard.

In 1985 Kees Teer retired as director. Philips as a whole took a turn for the worse and by the end of the 1980s bankruptcy seemed a very real possibility. Under research director Kees Bulthuis the position of long-term fundamental research at NatLab came under more and more pressure, especially after Philips introduced decentralized financing. Bulthuis reduced research budgets by the equivalent of 60 million euro in three years' time. Hundreds of NatLab employees were fired and departments were closed, including the entire mathematics department in Brussels. By 1989 the NatLab, which had formerly been on the Board of Directors budget, drew two-thirds of its income from contracts with the product divisions. This made the role of the NatLab far more limited than before: it became a source of expertise rather than a source of innovation. In 1998, when Arie Huijser became general research director, top researchers Joseph Braat, Rudy van de Plassche, Kees Schouhamer Immink, and Dieter Kasperkovitz resigned, further accelerating NatLabs's decline. Kees Schouhamer Immink, in a newspaper interview, told that the research management was a chaos which spoiled the atmosphere. As a result, academic freedom was far gone. Fundamental research, research driven purely by curiosity, was strictly reined in and priority was given to the short-term interests of the product divisions.

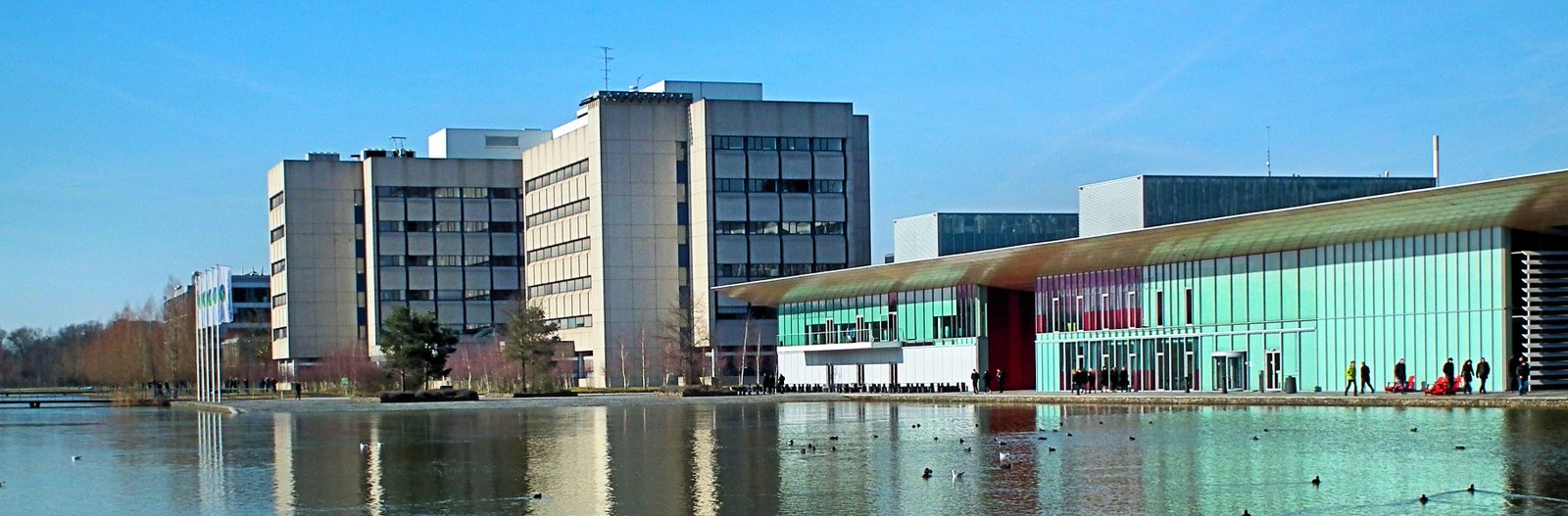
High Tech Campus, Eindhoven

In 2000, Philips decided on a new direction for the NatLab and the grounds it was housed on: The decision was made to transform and sell the whole of it into an open innovation facility for technology companies, of which Philips Research was only a small one. The new name is the High Tech Campus Eindhoven, which has by now completely subsumed the old NatLab. This decision by Philips also fit with the new direction chosen by the company, "Health and Lifestyle".

Philips has divested itself of branches like the Lighting and semiconductors branches (now the independent NXP), which has reduced the on-site size of Philips Research to 200 as of 2016.

=== After 2012 ===
In March 2012 High Tech Campus Eindhoven was sold by Philips to Ramphastos Investments, a private consortium of investors. Philips remained as tenant, but its status changed from owner/manager to resident.

== Academic appointments and personal honors ==
The Natlab had a great impact on science in The Netherlands. The list of appointments and honors compiled by Henk Hagenbeuk, shows the close cooperation between the Dutch universities and Philips Research until the 1990s. The cooperation worked both ways: researchers were appointed as (part-time) professor at the universities, and vice versa graduates joined the Philips Research. Philips researchers received prestigious awards in technical fields.

=== Personal honors received ===
- 1976 US National Academy of Engineering Membership - Hendrik Casimir Leadership in research and development of electron tubes, solid-state devices, glass and metal products
- 2003 US National Academy of Engineering Membership - Kees Schouhamer Immink For pioneering and advancing the era of digital audio, video, and data recording
- 1970 US National Academy of Sciences Membership - Hendrik Casimir
- 1935 IEEE Medal of Honor - Balthasar van der Pol For his fundamental studies and contributions in the field of circuit theory and electromagnetic wave propagation phenomena
- 2017 IEEE Medal of Honor - Kees Schouhamer Immink For pioneering contributions to video, audio, and data recording technology, including compact disc, DVD, and Blu-ray
- 1973 IEEE Edison Medal - Bernard D. H. Tellegen For a creative career of significant achievement in electrical circuit theory, including the gyrator
- 1999 IEEE Edison Medal - Kees Schouhamer Immink For a career of creative contributions to the technologies of digital video, audio, and data recording
- 2003 Personal Emmy Award - Kees Schouhamer Immink For coding technology for optical recording formats

== Notable alumni ==
Alumni	Notes
Hendrik Casimir	was a Dutch physicist best known for his research on the two-fluid model of superconductors (together with C. J. Gorter) in 1934 and the Casimir effect (together with D. Polder) in 1948. Was the head of NatLab from 1946 until 1972.
Balthasar van der Pol	main interests were in radio wave propagation, theory of electrical circuits, and mathematical physics. The Van der Pol oscillator, one of the most widely used models of nonlinear self-oscillation, is named after him. He was awarded the Institute of Radio Engineers (now the IEEE) Medal of Honor in 1935.
Kees Schouhamer Immink	pioneered and advanced the era of digital audio, video, and data recording, including popular digital media such as Compact Disc, DVD and Blu-ray Disc. He has been a prolific and influential engineer, who holds more than 1100 US and international patents. He was awarded both the 2017 IEEE Medal of Honor "for pioneering contributions to video, audio, and data recording technology, including compact disc, DVD, and Blu-ray", and the 1999 IEEE Edison Medal, and a personal Emmy award in 2004.
Bernard Tellegen	was a Dutch electrical engineer and inventor of the pentode and the gyrator. He is also known for a theorem in circuit theory, Tellegen's theorem. He won the IEEE Edison Medal in 1973 "For a creative career of significant achievement in electrical circuit theory, including the gyrator"
Dick Raaymakers	was a Dutch composer, theater maker and theorist. He was known as a pioneer in the field of electronic music and tape music.
Carlo Beenakker	is a Dutch physicist. He is known for his contributions to mesoscopic physics and is currently a professor at Leiden university.
Amar Bose	stayed one year at NatLab. He was an American academic and entrepreneur, and a professor at MIT and the founder and chairman of Bose corporation

== See also ==
- Central Research Laboratories, EMI, west London
- Philips Research Laboratories, Redhill, Surrey
