= Shunske Sato =

Japanese-born violinist

- Born: 10 June 1984 (age 41); Tokyo, Japan
- Genres: Classical music
- Occupation: Violinist
- Instrument: Violin
- Website: shunskesato.com

Shunske Sato (Japanese: 佐藤 俊介, Hepburn: Satō Shunsuke; born 10 June 1984 in Tokyo) is a Japanese-born violinist. He was the concertmaster and artistic director of the Netherlands Bach Society from 2018 to 2023.

== Early life and education ==
Sato was born in Tokyo, Japan. When he was two years old, on a family outing to a shrine, Sato was intrigued by sounds from a Suzuki violin studio, which led him to begin playing the violin. He moved to the United States when he was three years old. Sato attended Central High School in Philadelphia.

Sato was mentored by Chin Kim and Dorothy DeLay and trained and educated by Masao Kawasaki at the Juilliard School, Jaime Laredo at the Curtis Institute, Gérard Poulet at the École Normale de Musique de Paris, and Mary Utiger at Hochschule für Musik und Theater München.

== Career ==
Sato started his concert career in the United States at age 12 by winning the Young Concert Artists first prize in 1997, becoming the youngest winner. He then performed throughout North America, Europe, and Japan as a soloist with orchestras such as Baltimore Symphony, Seattle Symphony, National Symphony Orchestra (United States), Minnesota Orchestra, NHK Symphony Orchestra, State Academic Symphony Orchestra of the Russian Federation, Mariinsky Theatre Orchestra, Omsk Academy Symphony Orchestra, Bavarian Radio Symphony Orchestra, Orchestre philharmonique de Radio France, Gulbenkian Orchestra, and Copenhagen Philharmonic.

Writing for The New York Times, Allan Kozinn praised Sato in his New York recital debut in 2000 as having "developed an astonishing level of poise and musicality".

In 2001, Sato became the youngest artist to perform Beethoven's violin concerto at the Beethoven Festival in Bonn, Germany, which was broadcast through Deutsche Welle.

He was the recipient of a loan by Nippon Music Foundation and a winner of Idemitsu Music Award in 2005 sponsored by Idemitsu Kosan, one of the leading oil companies in Japan.

In 2007, as a violist, Sato recorded viola solo sonatas written for Sato by Akira Nishimura for Camerata Tokyo.

As a baroque violinist, he won the Second Prize and the Audience Award at the 17th International Johann Sebastian Bach Competition in Leipzig, Germany in July, 2010. The Agency for Cultural Affairs of Japan chose Sato to be a recipient of the New Face Prize in the Music Division at its 65th Arts Festival based on his Baroque recital which took place in Tokyo on 29 October 2010.

In October 2011, Sato made his UK debut in Cambridge and London with the Academy of Ancient Music under the direction of Richard Egarr, performing Niccolò Paganini's Violin Concerto No. 2 with gut strings on a period instrument.

In January 2013, Sato was appointed concertmaster of the Netherlands Bach Society Orchestra, succeeding Johannes Leertouwer, as well as the Concerto Köln. That same month, Sato also received a baroque violin made by Giovanni Grancino around 1695 on loan from the Jumpstart Jr. Foundation in Amsterdam, Netherlands. In November, the Amsterdam School of the Arts announced its appointment of Sato as a guest teacher to the Early Music Department. In December, Sato performed duo recitals of Mozart's sonatas at the Izumi Hall in Osaka and the Toppan Hall in Tokyo, Japan along with German pianist and harpsichordist Andreas Staier.

In August 2015, Sato made his Canadian debut in Montreal with the Montreal Symphony Orchestra under the direction of Kent Nagano, performing Johann Sebastian Bach's Violin Concerto No.1 with a period instrument.

In September 2016, Sato made his Australian debut in Sydney and Melbourne with the Australian Brandenburg Orchestra under direction of Paul Dyer, performing Niccolò Paganini's Violin Concerto No. 4, playing with gut strings. In the tour, Sato directed Felix Mendelssohn's String Symphony No. 3 and Edvard Grieg's Holberg Suite Op. 40. The live concert in Melbourne was recorded and broadcast by ABC Classic FM, and in February 2017 it was released in CD from ABC Classics. In November 2016, Sato performed Antonio Vivaldi's The Four Seasons with Concerto Köln, which was recorded live in Kempen, Germany, and released by Berlin Classics.

On 11 May 2017, Sato was appointed the 6th artistic director of the Netherlands Bach Society (Nederlandse Bachvereniging) beginning on 1 June 2018, succeeding Jos van Veldhoven.

In April 2019, Sato received the 31st Music Award in Classical Music/Solo Performance by the Japan Music Pen Club. From 28 September to 6 October 2019, as the 6th artistic director of the Netherlands Bach Society, Sato led a concert tour with the ensemble in Kyoto, Kanagawa, Hiroshima, and Tokyo Japan.

On 1 January 2020, Mainichi Shimbun published the 61st Arts Awards recipients, including Sato, based on his leadership of The Netherlands Bach Society's Japan tour and his J. S. Bach unaccompanied Sonatas and Partitas recitals in Tokyo, Kyoto, Yokohama, Saitama, Hiroshima. Later that month, the Record Geijutsu Journal awarded Sato the 57th Record Academy Award Silver Prize, the highest prize as a soloist, highly evaluating his unaccompanied solo works by J. S. Bach, released the year prior. In March, the Agency for Cultural Affairs announced the 76th Ministry of Education, Culture, Sports, Science and Technology Awards in Arts, which recognized Sato as a recipient of the Newcomer Award in Arts. On 11 December 2020, Sato officially debuted as a conductor at the AVRO TV live televised concert of Netherlands Bach Society at TivoliVredenburg in Utrecht, Netherlands.

In April 2022, Sato conducted St Matthew Passion, leading the Netherlands Bach Society as the first tour after COVID-19 pandemic in the Netherlands lockdown.

In January, February and June 2023, Sato, Clive Brown, and Concerto Köln participated in "Historical Performance Practice of the 19th Century – Romanticism". In March, Sato conducted the Tokyo Symphony Orchestra for works in the Classical and Romantic Periods, and also performed Violin Concerto No. 8 by Louis Spohr. On 30 May 2023, Sato resigned as the concertmaster, soloist, and artistic director of the Netherlands Bach Society after a farewell concert. He said he wanted to play other kinds of music but was hindered by his obligations to the Bach Society.

== Discography ==
Title	Details
Eugène Ysaÿe: Six Sonatas for Solo Violin	Recorded: August 2004; Released: January 2005; Label: Live Notes; Formats: CD; Track list: 1. Sonata in G minor Op.27 No.1; 2. Sonata in A minor Op.27 No.2; 3. Sonata in D minor "Ballade" Op.27 No.3; 4. Sonata in E minor Op.27 No.4; 5. Sonata in G major Op.27 No.5; 6. Sonata in E major Op.27 No.6; Daily Yomiuri The Best New CD of the Month (February 2005); The Asahi Shimbun The Critics' Recommendation (February 2005); Mainichi Daily News The Critics' Choice (February 2005)
Preludes: Favorite Miniatures	Recorded: November 2005; Released: March 2006; Label: Live Notes; Formats: CD; Pianist: Takashi Sato; Track list: 1. Three Preludes (comp. George Gershwin, arr. Jascha Heifetz); 2. Nocturne (comp. Lili Boulanger); 3. À la Valse (comp. Victor Herbert); 4. Lensky's Aria (comp. Pyotr Ilyich Tchaikovsky, arr. Leopold Auer); 5. Molly on the Shore (comp. Percy Grainger, arr. Fritz Kreisler); 6. Songs My Mother Taught Me (comp. Antonín Dvořák, arr. Kreisler); 7. Serenade (comp. Alfredo D'Ambrosio, arr. Mischa Elman); 8. Estrellita (comp. Manuel Ponce, arr. Heifetz); 9. Le petit âne blanc (comp. Jacques Ibert, arr. Heifetz); 10. Abendlied (comp. Robert Schumann, arr. Nathan Milstein); 11. Sérénade espagnole (comp. Cécile Chaminade, arr. Kreisler); 12. Guitarre (comp. Moritz Moszkowski, arr. Pablo de Sarasate); 13. Chanson arabe (comp. Nikolai Rimsky-Korsakov, arr. Kreisler); 14. Dance of the Marionette (comp. Felix Winternitz, arr. Kreisler); 15. La plus que lente (comp. Claude Debussy, arr. Roque); 16. Caprice in E-flat (comp. Henryk Wieniawski, arr. Kreisler); 17. Polonaise Brillante (comp. Henryk Wieniawski)
Edvard Grieg: Complete Sonatas for Violin and Piano	Recorded: June 2007; Released: October 2007; Label: Live Notes; Format: CD; Pianist: Takashi Sato; Track list: 1. Sonata no.1 in F major, op.8 2. Sonata no.2 in G major, op.13 3. Sonata no.3 in C minor, op.45; Grand Prize awarded by the Agency for Cultural Affairs, 62nd National Arts Festival 2007
Shunske Sato Plays: Violin and Viola Solo Sonatas by Akira Nishimura	Recorded: March 2007; Released: March 2008; Label: Camerata; Format: CD; Composer: Akira Nishimura; Track list: 1. Sonata No. 1 for violin ('Incantation') (2005); 2. Sonata No. 2 for violin ('Trance Medium') (2005); 3. Sonata No. 3 for violin ('Characters of flame') (2007); 4. Monologue for solo violin (1995); 5. Sonata No. 1 for viola ('Whirl dance') (2005); 6. Sonata No. 2 for viola ('Mantra on the C string') (2007); 7. Fantasia on 'Song of the Birds', for viola (2005); 8. Threnody, for viola (1999)
Paganini: 24 Caprices	Recorded: January 2009; Released: April 2009; Label: UCJ Japan; Format: CD; Track list: 1. Caprice no.1 in E major 2. Caprice no.2 in B minor 3. Caprice no.3 in E minor 4. Caprice no.4 in C minor 5. Caprice no.5 in A minor 6. Caprice no.6 in G minor 7. Caprice no.7 in A minor 8. Caprice no.8 in E♭ major 9. Caprice no.9 in E major 10. Caprice no.10 in G minor 11. Caprice no.11 in C major 12. Caprice no.12 in A♭ major 13. Caprice no.13 in B♭ major 14. Caprice no.14 in E♭ major 15. Caprice no.15 in E minor 16. Caprice no.16 in G minor 17. Caprice no.17 in E♭ major 18. Caprice no.18 in C major 19. Caprice no.19 in E♭ major 20. Caprice no.20 in D major 21. Caprice no.21 in A major 22. Caprice no.22 in F major 23. Caprice no.23 in E♭ major 24. Caprice no.24 in A minor; Daily Yomiuri The Best New CD of the Month (May 2009); Mainichi Daily News The Critics' Choice (May 2009); CD Journal The Choice of the Month (May 2009); Record Geijutsu The best album of the month (June 2009); Early Music America Magazine (Volume 17, Number 4, Winter 2011): IN CONCLUSION Hats Off, Gentle People! Is the Revolution Over? (by Anthony Martin)
Joseph Haydn: Oxford, Violin Concerto No. 1, Ludwig van Beethoven: Symphony No. 2 Hidemi Suzuki & Orchestra Libera Classica, Shunske Sato	Recorded: 24 October 2010; Released: 26 May 2011; Label: Arte Dell'arco Japan; Format: CD; Track list: 1. Haydn: Violin Concerto No.1 in C Major Hob.VIIa:1; 2. Haydn: Symphony No.92 in G Major Hob.I:92 "Oxford"; 3. Beethoven: Symphony No.2 in D Major op.36; Daily Yomiuri The Recommended New CD of the Month (June 2011)
Georg Philipp Telemann: 12 Fantasias for Violin without Bass	Recorded: December 2011; Released: 31 July 2012; Label: Live Notes; Format: CD; Track list: 1. Fantasia no.1 in B-flat major TWV; 2. Fantasia no.2 in G major TWV; 3. Fantasia no.3 in F minor TWV; 4. Fantasia no.4 in D major TWV; 5. Fantasia no.5 in A major TWV; 6. Fantasia no.6 in E minor TWV; 7. Fantasia no.7 in E-flat major TWV; 8. Fantasia no.8 in E major TWV; 9. Fantasia no.9 in B minor TWV; 10. Fantasia no.10 in D major TWV; 11. Fantasia no.11 in F major TWV; 12. Fantasia no.12 in A minor TWV; The Record Geijutsu: The Editor's Choice (October 2012); The Ongakuno Tomo: The Best New Cd of the Month (September 2012); Daily Yomiuri The Best New CD of the Month (August 2012); The Asahi Shimbun The Critics' Recommendation (August 2012); CD Journal: Editor's Choice (September 2012) Reissued edition: Released: 20 December 2020; Label: Live Notes
Joseph Haydn, Wolfgang Amadeus Mozart, Ludwig van Beethoven: Haydn Symphony No. 67, Mozart Violin Concerto No.1, Beethoven Symphony No.4 Hidemi Suzuki & Orchestra Libera Classica, Shunske Sato	Released: 20 October 2014; Label: Arte Dell'arco Japan; Format: CD; Track list: 1. Mozart: Violin Concerto No. 1 in B flat Major K.207; 2. Haydn: Symphony No.67 in F Major Hob.I-67; 3. Beethoven: Symphony No.4 in B flat Major op.60
Antonio Vivaldi: The Four Seasons Concerto Köln & Shunske Sato	Released: 18 November 2016; Label: Berlin Classics Germany; Track list: 1. Concerto No. 1 in E major The Four Seasons: Spring Op. 8, No.1 RV 269; 2. Concerto No. 2 in G minor The Four Seasons: Summer Op. 8, No.2 RV 315; 3. Concerto No. 3 in F major The Four Seasons: Autumn Op. 8, No.3 RV 293; 4. Concerto No. 4 in F minor The Four Seasons: Winter Op. 8, No.4 RV 297; The Best Classical Music Album of the year by Deutschlandradio; The Best Classical Album of the year by Junge Weld
The Romantics - Grieg | Mendelssohn | Paganini Australian Brandenburg Orchestra & Shunske Sato	Released: 3 February 2017; Label: ABC Classics Australia; Track list: 1. EDVARD GRIEG: From Holberg's Time – Suite in the Olden Style; 2. FELIX MENDELSSOHN: String Symphony No. 3 in E minor 3. NICCOLÒ PAGANINI: Violin Concerto No. 4 in D minor
Bach: Violin Concertos Shunske Sato, Il Pomo d'Oro (orchestra), Zefira Valova	Released: 26 October 2018; Label: Rhino Warner Classics; Track list: 1. J. S. Bach: Violin Concerto No. 1 in A minor BWV 1041; 2. J. S. Bach: Violin Concerto No. 2 in E Major BWV 1042; 3. J. S. Bach: Concerto for Two Violins in D minor BWV 1043; 4. J. S. Bach: Violin Concerto No. 5 in G minor (arr. Forkel) BWV 1056R; The Record Geijutsu: The Editor's Choice The best album of the month (December 2018); Gramophone: Editor's Choice (January 2019)
Étienne Méhul, Ludwig van Beethoven, Joseph Haydn: Méhul Opera "Stratonice" Overture, Beethoven Violin Concerto, Haydn Symphony No.94 Hob.I:94 "Surprise" Hidemi Suzuki & Orchestra Libera Classica, Shunske Sato	Released: 7 May 2019; Label: Arte Dell'arco Japan; Track list: 1. Méhul: Opera "Stratonice" Overture; 2. Beethoven: Violin Concerto in D Major op.61 3. Haydn: Symphony No.94 in G Major Hob.I-94 "Surprise"; The Record Geijutsu: The Editor's Choice (August 2019); The Asahi Shimbun The Critics' Recommendation (July 2019)
Johann Sebastian Bach: J.S.Bach: Sonatas and Partitas for solo violin / Shunsuke Sato	Recorded: 1–4, 31, May, 2 June 2017; Released: 1 August 2019; Label: ACOUSTIC REVIVE; Track list: 1. Sonata no.1 in G minor BWV 1001; 2. Partita no.1 in B minor BWV 1002; 3. Sonata no.2 in A minor BWV 1003; 4. Partita no.2 in D minor BWV 1004; 5. Sonata no.3 in C major BWV 1005; 6. Partita no.3 in E major BWV 1006; The Record Geijutsu: The Editor's Choice The best album of the month (November 2019); The Ongakuno Tomo: The Best New Cd of the Month (November 2012); The Asahi Shimbun For Your Collection Classic The Best Disc (17 October 2019); Daily Yomiuri The Best New CD of the Month (17 October 2019); CD Journal: The Choice of the Month (27 August 2019)
Concertos 4 Violins Concerto Köln, Shunske Sato, Mayumi Hirasaki, Evgeny Sviridov, Jesús Merino-Ruiz.	Released: 28 August 2020; Label: Berlin Classics Germany; Track list: 1. Vivaldi: Violin Concerto in B minor Op.3-10 RV580; 2. Bonporti: Violin Concerto in E major Op.11-9; 3. Vivaldi: Violin Concerto in D major Op.3-1 RV549; 4. Valentini: Violin Concerto in A minor Op.7-11; 5. Castrucci: Violin Concerto in G minor Op.3-6; 6. Locatelli: Violin Concerto in F major Op.4-12
