= Servaes de Koninck =

Flemish composer

Servaes de Koninck, or Servaes de Konink, Servaas de Koninck or Servaas de Konink, or Servaes de Coninck (1653/54 – c.1701) was a Flemish baroque composer of motets, Dutch songs, chamber and incidental music, French airs and Italian cantatas. After training and starting his career in Flanders he moved to Amsterdam in the Dutch Republic, where he was active in circles connected to the Amsterdam Theatre.

== Life and work ==
=== Youth and education in the Southern Low Countries ===
De Koninck (Coninck) was born at Dendermonde (Flanders) in 1653. From 1663 to 1665, he was a boy chorister at St. James Church in Ghent. In 1675, he became a student at the University of Leuven. Around 1680, he lived in Brussels.

=== Career in the Republic ===
About 1685, he took up residence in Amsterdam in the Dutch Republic, where he had been preceded by another composer from the Southern Netherlands, Carolus Hacquart. He operated in circles connected to the Amsterdam Theatre and he probably worked later on as an independent musician in Amsterdam. He was a music teacher at the Lucie Quarter's French girls’ school.

Between 1696 and 1699, he issued seven opus numbers, published by Estienne Roger in Amsterdam: two volumes of sonatas for one and two flutes with and without basso continuo, the tragedy Athalie by Jean Racine of which De Koninck set the choirs to music (1697), two volumes of trios, the Hollandsche Minne- en Drinkliederen (also from 1697) and a volume of motets (1699). The short time in which Roger published the opus numbers suggests that a number of compositions might have been completed previously and had only been waiting for a publisher. Apart from this collection, a number of compositions are kept in manuscript and print. De Koninck died in Amsterdam around 1701.

=== The circle around Cornelis Sweerts ===
De Koninck was one of a group of four Amsterdam composers of foreign origin who, in the period around 1700, contributed to the temporary flowering of Dutch vocal music and whose names are linked to the bookseller Cornelis Sweerts and the poet Abraham Alewijn. In addition to De Koninck, the circle comprised:

- David Petersen (ca. 1651-after 1709) from Lübeck
- Nicholas Ferdinand le Grand (ca. 1655–1710), from France or the Southern Netherlands and
- Hendrik Anders (1657–1714) from Oberweißbach, Thuringia

Songs by Anders and De Koninck appeared in the Verscheide Nieuwe Zangen (Several New Songs), issued by Cornelis Sweerts in 1697, while Ferdinand le Grand had already set texts to music by Sweerts in the Tweede deel der Mengelzangen (The Second Part of Mixed Songs) in 1695. In 1705 Alewijn and Sweerts were the poets in the Boertige en ernstige minnezangen, set to music by Petersen, Anders, and De Koninck.

In his introduction to the art of singing and playing, Sweerts listed almost all composers (Hendrik Anders, David Petersen, Johannes Schenck, Carl Rosier and Servaes de Koninck) who played a part in the temporary blossoming of music using Dutch texts in the late 17th century:

Cornelis Sweerts on the Dutch composers of his time:	Approximate English translation:
”Heel stip heeft ANDERS daar in ‘t Neerduits op gelet, Dat die naar de Italjaanse en Franschen trant gezet Kan werden: en het blijkt, dat hij in beide taalen Niet zo veel glorie als in ‘t Neerduits zou behalen: Ook doen ons PETERZEN en SCHENK op ‘t klaarste zien, Dat elk zijn eigen spraak meer eere hoort te bien: Zoo zijn ‘er van ROZIER en KONING braave stukken, Die opgezongen naar de kunst, elkeen verrukken.”	”In a very accurate way, ANDERS made possible Dutch lyrics, To be adapted to the French and Italian style And it seems as if he would not reach in both languages As much glory as in the Dutch language: Also, PETERZEN and SCHENK make us understand, That each one should honour his own language even more: Thus, there are nice pieces by ROZIER and KONING Which, elevated to become art, are a delight to all of us.”

=== Lyrical theatre ===
De Koninck, as well as Anders and Petersen, were active in a genre of the lyrical theatre pretty near to opera, the Zangspel, in which machinery, instrumental music, and theatre songs had an important share. The texts of these songs came from Sweerts, Abraham Alewijn and Dirck Buysero. In 1688, De Koninck's pastoral De Vryadje van Cloris en Roosje (The Flirtation of Cloris and Rosette), of which the libretto is attributed to Buysero, became a resounding success. The short farce became a piece of repertoire. It soon became a tradition to offer it as a supplement after the annual performance of Vondel’s Gijsbrecht van Aemstel. This tradition continued into the 20th century, but without De Koninck's music, as his score disappeared in 1772 in the fire that destroyed the theatre; new theatre music was composed by Bartholomeus Ruloffs.

It is noteworthy to remark that nothing from this musical comedy was printed, while other theatre pieces with music by De Koninck, or selected songs were published. It is not excluded that part of the music is included in the series De Hollantsche Schouburgh, of which De Koninck was the first editor for Estienne Roger; a series of which were issued in seven volumes between 1697 and 1716 in Amsterdam.

=== Love and Drinking Songs ===
A special edition within the series of seven, published by De Koninck at Estienne Roger's editing house, was the volume with Hollandse Minne- en Drinkliederen (Dutch Love and Drinking Songs), of which the poet is not known by name and which are meant for a middle class public. In order to sell them better, it had emphatically been stated they were composed in the French and Italian manner; These indications on the style fit into Roger's publishing policy, as he wanted to give an international hallmark to his fund.

The French manner refers to Jean-Baptiste Lully, a French composer of Italian birth, who stood for a sophisticated and reserved style, an idiom that De Koninck controlled in minute detail. The Italian style is more expressive and also more extroverted, but is not that prominently present in this volume. This hybrid style, however, illustrates undoubtedly the international, eclectic musical environment in Amsterdam at the end of the 17th century.

In this volume, De Koninck also experiments with larger and more elaborate occupations which – not surprisingly – are reminiscent of the theatre; seven songs in his collection are combined to make a dialogue of Coridon and Climene, which ends with a duet in the Italian manner.

=== Other volumes ===
Another volume by De Koninck, issued by Roger, and which deserves special attention, is his opus 7, Sacrarum armoniarum (1699), in which the impact of the recent Italian musical developments is best reflected in the motet to the Blessed Virgin Mary, Mortales Sperate, especially in the two small da capo arias for tenor and alto and in the increased share of instruments in continuous dialogue with the singers. The Latin motets recall the composer's Catholic background.

De Koninck's sonatas demonstrate the influence of Corelli, while his violin compositions are influenced by Petersen and Schenck. In his incidental music for Athalie, Lully nor Charpentier ever seem far away. Like Couperin and Clérambault, De Koninck saw himself as an advocate of the so-called goûts réünis.

== Discography ==
Pieces by Servaes de Koninck are rarely recorded on compact disc. As of 2009, the only compact disc solely devoted to his music is:

- Servaas de Koninck. Ah! I wish I were a little dog! Love and Drinking Songs of the Netherlands, by Dopo Emilio, Emergo Classics EC 3961–2, 1993.

A number of other compact discs include music by De Koninck:

- Saints & Sinners, by Cappella Figuralis, led by Jos van Veldhoven, Channel Classics, 1998 (De Koninck's motet Venite ad me (De Elevatione))
- Four Dutch Composers of the Golden Age, Ensemble Bouzignac Utrecht, led by Erik Van Nevel, Vanguard Classics, 1995 (De Koninck's motet Mortales sperate)
- Musica Neerlandica, Apollo Ensemble & Max van Egmond, 1995 (De Koninck's Dutch drinking song In het glaasjen, In the little glass)

== References and sources ==
- Rasch, Rudolf A. (2001). "Konink [Coninck, Koning, Koninck etc.], Servaas [Servaes, Servatius] de". Grove Music Online (8th ed.). Oxford University Press. ISBN 978-1-56159-263-0.
- Pieter Dirksen, Zingen in een kleine taal rond 1700 (Singing in a small language around 1700), in Een muziekgeschiedenis der Nederlanden (A Music History of the Netherlands), Ed. Louis Peter Grijp, Amsterdam University Press - Salomé – Ed. Pelckmans – Meertens Institute - Koninklijke Vereniging voor Nederlandse Muziekgeschiedenis, Amsterdam, 2001, ISBN 90-5356-488-8 (for Belgium Ed. Pelckmans ISBN 90-2893-000-0)
- Frits Noske, Nederlandse liedkunst in de zeventiende eeuw: Remigius Schrijver en Servaas de Koninck in Tijdschrift van de Vereniging voor Nederlandse Muziekgeschiedenis, Vol. 34, No. 1 (1984), pp. 49–67, JSTOR 939049.
- Anthony Zielhorst, Nederlandse liedkunst in Amsterdam rond 1700 (The Art of Dutch Song in Amsterdam about 1700), Part 3, Utrecht, 1991
- Rudolf Rasch, Servaes de Koninck in Het HonderdComponistenBoek (The Hundred Composers Book). Nederlandse muziek van Albicastro tot Zweers (Dutch Music from Albicastro to Zweers), Pay-Uun Hiu and Jolande van der Klis (ed.), Haarlem, 1997
