= Camerata Trajectina =

Dutch music ensemble

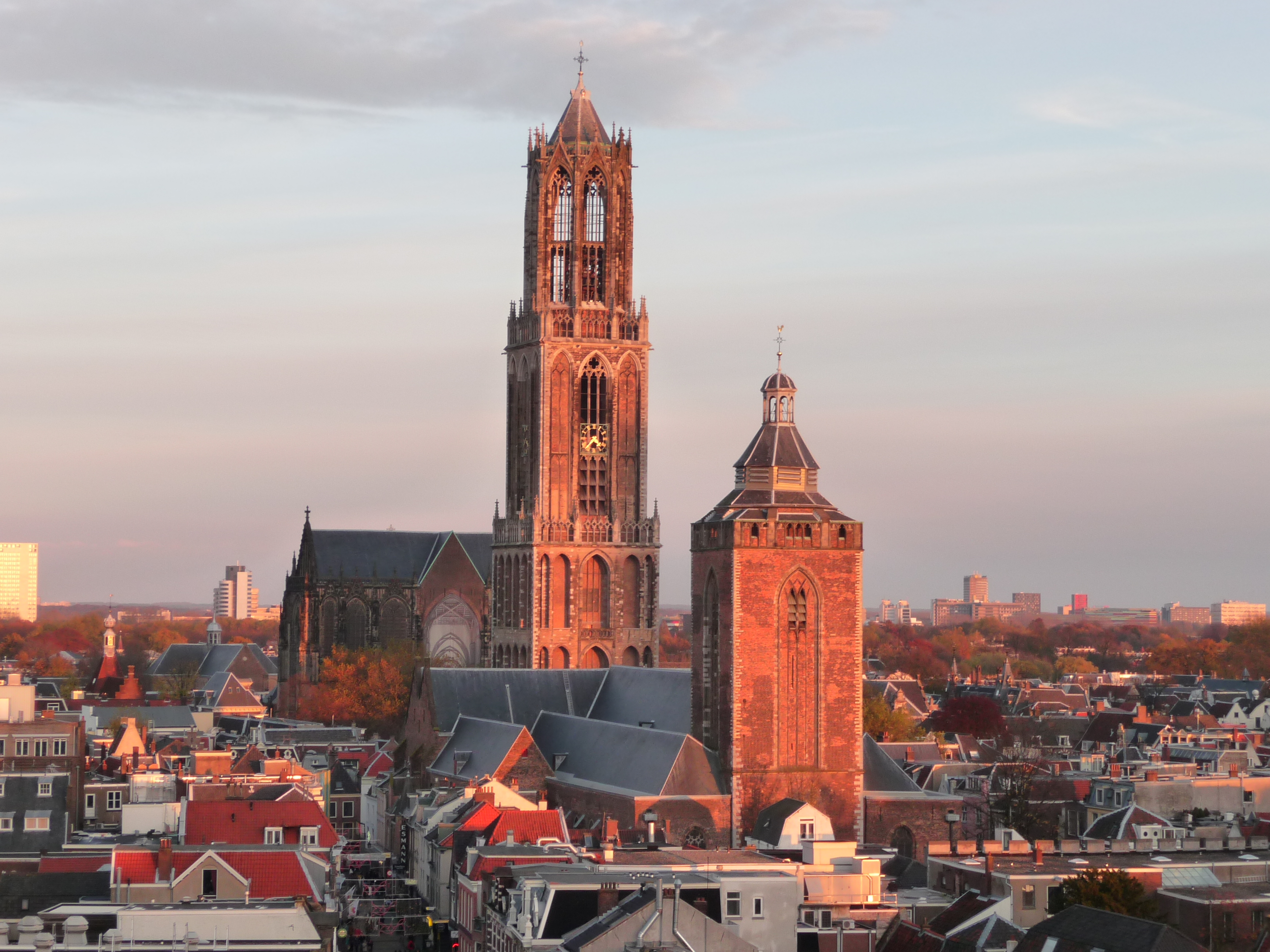

Camerata Trajectina is a Dutch early music ensemble (in English, the word, "camerata," generally means a choir or small chamber orchestra).

The ensemble was founded in Utrecht (hence Latin trajectina; of Utrecht) in 1974 by Jos van Veldhoven and Jan Nuchelmans. Following the departure of Veldhoven in 1976 to lead the Utrechts Barok Consort, leadership of the ensemble passed to the current director, the musicologist Louis Peter Grijp (b. 1954).

The ensemble has specialised in recovering and sometimes reconstructing Dutch vocal music from the Dutch Golden Age, and much of its discography are of Dutch-language songs which have not been recorded. The ensemble has particularly concentrated on domestic, middle-class, and Dutch-language church music which—unlike the Latin language church music of the Spanish Netherlands—is little known and little researched. The lyrics of the recovered songs often illustrate cultural history, as in the case of the ensemble's two recordings of Dutch sea shanties.

They have cooperated twice with the poet Gerrit Komrij; the first time in reconstruction of Jacob Obrecht's secular works. The original texts to Obrecht's Dutch songs had been lost, leaving only Dutch incipits as titles of instrumental versions. Komrij wrote new texts in the style of lyrics of Obrecht's time. A second project based on The Seven Deadly Sins and the Four Last Things of Hieronymus Bosch set new Dutch texts to 16th Century melodies.

== Selected publications and discography ==
- Muziek uit de Gouden Eeuw – Music of the Golden Age. LP 1986 and 1987, CD 1992 (GLO 6013)
- Pacxken van minnen – Middeleeuwse muziek uit de Nederlanden - medieval Dutch music. 1992 (GLO 6016)
- Souterliedekens 1540 – Clemens non Papa. 1994 (Globe 6020)
- Muziek uit de Muiderkring – Music of the Muiden Circle, songs of and for Maria Tesselschade 1994 (GLO 6026)
- Jacob van Eyck, painter and storyteller 1994 Rijksmuseum, Amsterdam. 2007 (Philips)
- Bavianen en slijkgeuzen – Baboons and Mud Beggars, Songs of Remonstrants and Counter-Remonstrants. 1995 (GLO 6031)
- Cantiones natalitiae – Christmas Songs from the time of Rubens. 1995 (Globe)
- Genade ende Vrede (2CD set) – Grace and peace; Mennonite songs. 1996 (GLO 6038)
- The Musical World of Jan Steen 1996 (Globe 6040)
- Hollandse Madrigalen – Dutch-language Madrigals by Cornelis Schuyt, Cornelis Tymanszoon Padbrué and Joan Albert Ban 1996 (GLO 6042) 1996
- Maastrichts Liedboek – Polyphonic songs from the Niewe Duytsche Liedekens (Maastricht 1554). Clemens non Papa, Ludovicus Episcopius (+ sampler CD) (GLO 6046)
- De Vrede van Munster – The Peace of Münster 1648, Dutch music from the Reformation. 1997 (GLO 6048)
- Japix Gysbert 1603–1666 – Frisian Songs to tunes by Goudimel, Bourgeois, Pierre Guédron. (GLO 6055)
- Zingende Zwanen – Heiligenliederen uit de Gouden Eeuw Singing Swans - Sacred songs of the Golden Age, contrafacta to Dutch texts of Johannes Stalpaert van der Wiele and Guillelmus de Swaen. (GLO 6053)
- Liederen van varen en vechten – Songs of sailing and fighting; Songs of the Dutch East India Company (GLO 6054)
- Peeckelharing – Pickled herring; Music around the painter Frans Hals. (Globe 6056)
- De Kist van Pierlala – The coffin of Pierlala; Dutch street songs from the broadside ballads collection of the Koniklijke Biliotheek in Den Haag and the Meertens Instituut in Amsterdam (18-20C). (GLO 6057)
- Het Antwerps Liedboek 1544 – The Antwerp songbook (2CD) 2004 (GLO 6058) Edison Klassiek award 2006 in the category Middle Ages and Renaissance.
- Obrecht - Secular songs with reconstructed texts by Gerrit Komrij (Globe 6059)
- Jacob Cats 1577-1660 – Mourning Maidens and other songs to moral texts (Globe 6063)
- Theatermuziek uit de Gouden Eeuw – Theatre music from the Golden Age - to plays by Pieter Corneliszoon Hooft, Jan Harmenszoon Krul, Vondel, and Jan Janszoon Starter. (Globe 6062)
- Johan Schenck: Bacchus, Ceres en Venus – The first Dutch opera reconstructed. (Globe)
- Calvijn in de Gouden Eeuw – Psalm settings of Sweelinck, Claude Le Jeune and Goudimel 2009 (Globe 6064)
- De Zeven Zonden van Jeroen Bosch – texts by Gerrit Komrij 2010 (Globe 6065)
- Cornelis Schuyt – Madrigali, Padovane & Gagliarde 2011 (Globe 6068)
- Carolus Hacquart - The Triumph of Love Camerata Trajectina 2013

With books

- Dirk Coigneau. Een zoet akkoord. (CD to accompany book). In series of the Meertens Instituut
