= David Petersen (composer) =

Dutch composer (1651–1737)

David Petersen (born Lübeck ca. 1650 or 1651 – died Amsterdam, before 5 May 1737) was a violinist and composer of north German origin active in the Dutch Republic. His last name is also spelled Pietersen.

In the 1670s he travelled to Lund, Sweden where he was an employee of the newly founded University. By 1680, however, he had moved to Amsterdam where he remained for the rest of his career.

He is notable for a collection of twelve sonatas for violin and basso continuo published in 1683 entitled Speelstukken. It is the only Dutch publication of its type in this period. There are similar collections of pieces for violin and bass by German composers such as Westhoff and Biber; however the sonatas are closest in style to Johann Jakob Walther's Scherzi da Violino solo con il basso continuo published in 1676. It is possible that Walther had connections to Amsterdam and may have taught Petersen.

Petersen's other compositions include a large number of song settings with continuo in Dutch. They were published in Amsterdam in collaboration with the Dutch poets Abraham Alewijn and Cornelis Sweerts. Petersen is also closely associated with a number of composers such as Servaes de Koninck and Hendrik Anders. Along with Johannes Schenck, Carolus Hacquart and Carl Rosier they contributed to a revival of Dutch music and arts in the period before 1710.

== Published works ==
- Speelstukken, Amsterdam, 1683
- Zede- en Harpgezangen met Zangkunst verrykt door David Petersen (24 songs to words by Abraham Alewijn), Amsterdam, 1694
- Vermeerderde Zede- en Harpgezangen (words by Alewijn), Amsterdam, 1711
- Zede- en Harpgezangen (words by Alewijn), Amsterdam, 1713
- Zede- en Harpgezangen (words by Alewijn), Amsterdam, 1715
- Boertige en Ernstige Minnezangen (music by Petersen and Hendrik Anders; words by Cornelis Sweerts), Amsterdam, 1705
- Boertige en Ernstige Minnezangen (music by Petersen and De Koninck, words by Alewijn), Amsterdam, 1705
- Boertige en Ernstige Minnezangen (music by Petersen and De Koninck, words by Alewijn), Amsterdam, 1709
- Incidental music for the play Andromeda, Amsterdam, 1730
