= Opera in Dutch =

Opera in Dutch is a minor tradition in the opera history of the Netherlands. Since the earliest operas were staged in the Netherlands in the 17th century, the preference has always been for original Italian, French and German versions, or occasionally French translations of Italian and German works.

The 1680s saw the first pastoral semi-operas in Dutch, De triomfeerende Min (1678) and Bacchus, Ceres en Venus (1686). The 18th century saw development of the zangspel (singspiel), such as Zemire en Azor (1784), but these failed to establish a vernacular opera tradition. Another example from this period is Johann August Just’s De koopman van Smyrna (1774), a comic opera in one act that was performed in The Hague and Amsterdam, showing early attempts to shape a Dutch-language operatic repertoire. With a few notable exceptions – such as the 1834 Dutch-language opera Saffo by Johannes Bernardus van Bree to a libretto by Jacob van Lennep (1802–1868), the 19th century saw no major Dutch-language operas. While there continued to be a tradition of art song and choral compositions in Dutch, in the 20th and 21st century original Dutch language opera compositions were to remain rare, and such as in the case of Willem Pijper's Halewijn (1932–34, after the tale of Heer Halewijn) not always well received.

Dutch-language translations of Italian standards were produced from 1886 by the Dutch Opera Company of Johannes George de Groot starting a minor strand in opera performance which persisted, with closures and openings of various opera companies, until World War I, and again in the inter-war years. A revived attempt to produce operas sung in Dutch was made by Dutch National Opera in the years following World War II.

Similarly in Belgium the Vlaamse Opera sang French and Italian works in Dutch till the 1980s. Peter Benoit produced his first opera in Flemish, Het dorp in't gebergte (A Mountain Village) in Brussels in 1856.

Dutch composer Louis Andriessen's De Materie (Matter) is a four-part vocal and orchestral work completed in 1988. Peter-Jan Wagemans' 2006 opera Legende premiered in 2011 at Dutch National Opera.
