= De triomfeerende Min =

1678 pastoral semi-opera by Carolus Hacquart

De triomfeerende Min (Love Triumphant) is a 1678 pastoral semi-opera by Carolus Hacquart to celebrate the Peace of Nijmegen.

It is one of the earliest surviving attempts at Dutch-language opera, 8 years before Bacchus, Ceres en Venus, a 1686 Dutch-language pastoral opera by Johan Schenck. A reconstruction was the basis for a recording by Camerata Trajectina in 2012.
