= Anthon van der Horst =

Dutch organist (1899–1965

Van der Horst in 1956

Anthon van der Horst (20 June 1899 ― 7 March 1965) was a Dutch organist, conductor, composer and academic teacher. He directed the Nederlandse Bachvereniging from 1931 to 1965.

== Life and career ==
Van der Horst was born in Amsterdam on 20 June 1899. He received his musical training with Jean-Baptiste de Pauw for organ and Bernhard Zweers for composition, among others. He was a cofounder of the Musiklyzeum in Amsterdam in 1921, where he lectured from 1922 to 1927. He then directed the Musiklyzeum in Hilversum. In 1935 he became leading professor of organ at the Conservatorium van Amsterdam, where he at times also was professor of conducting and choral conducting. He influenced Dutch organists including Bernard Bartelink, Jan J. van den Berg, Piet Kee, Albert de Klerk, Gert Oost, Piet Post, and Charles de Wolff.

In 1931 Van der Horst succeeded Evert Cornelis, who was ill, as director of the Nederlandse Bachvereniging. He led the annual performances of Bach's St Matthew Passion as well as performances of his Mass in B minor until his death. The performances at the Grote Kerk in Naarden, where he was the organist, drew an international audience. He was also conductor of the Royal Choral Association in Amsterdam, the Excelsior choir in The Hague, the Sursum Corda choir in Leiden and the Christian Oratorio Association in Utrecht. He made several recordings, including with the Concertgebouw Orchestra and the Amsterdam Chamber Orchestra.

Van der Horst died in Hilversum on 7 March 1965, at the age of 65.

== Awards ==
In 1919 Van der Horst was the first in the Netherlands to receive the Prix d'Excellence for organ. As a notable scholar of Bach's church music, he received an honorary doctorate in theology from the University of Groningen in 1948.

== Compositions ==
Van der Horst composed more than 100 works, especially for organ, piano, and choir, but also art songs, three symphonies, two organ concertos and a violin concerto.
