= Netherlands Bach Society =

Dutch ensemble specialising in Baroque music

- Nederlandse Bachvereniging
- English-language logo of the Netherlands Bach Society

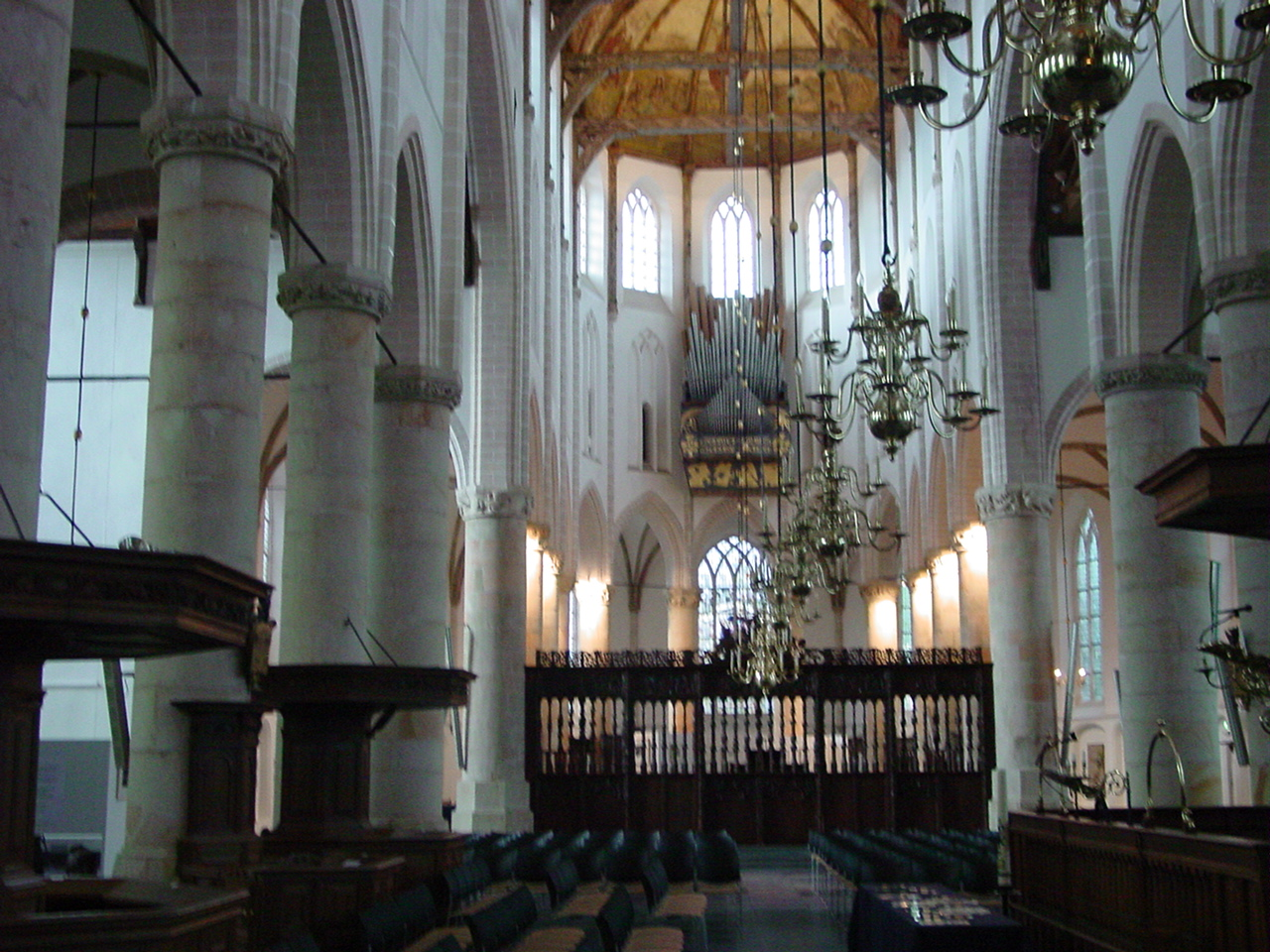
- Grote of Sint-Vituskerk, where the ensemble has performed traditionally
- Established: 1921
- Location: Naarden, Netherlands
- Field: Baroque music performance
- Website: www.bachvereniging.nl/en

The Netherlands Bach Society (Dutch: Nederlandse Bachvereniging) is the oldest ensemble for Baroque music in the Netherlands. The ensemble was founded in 1921 in Naarden to perform Bach's St Matthew Passion on Good Friday and has performed the work annually since then in the Grote of Sint-Vituskerk (Great Church or St Vitus Church).

The ensemble reached its 100th anniversary in 2021. In honor of the milestone, the Society started publishing a new and freely accessible recording every two weeks, including HD video of all 1080 works of Johann Sebastian Bach on YouTube, performed by members of the ensemble and guest musicians under the title All of Bach.

== History ==
De Nederlandse Bachvereniging was officially founded on 13 September 1921. Johan Schoonderbeek was one of the founding members and the first conductor. He had already conducted the St Matthew Passion with the Koninklijke Oratorium Vereniging Excelsior (Royal Oratorio Society Excelsior) in The Hague. The Netherlands Bach Society first performed the St Matthew Passion on Good Friday, 14 April 1922. Following the praxis of the period, the complete work was not performed. Performances of the work became a tradition which has since been retained.

After Schoonderbeek's death in 1927, Evert Cornelis, conductor of the Utrechts Symfonie Orkest, took over and was the first to conduct the complete work. He died in 1931.

His successor was Anthon van der Horst, who was also the organist of the church. He established regular performances of the St Matthew Passion and the Mass in B minor from 1931 until shortly before his death in 1965, attracting listeners from the Netherlands and abroad. He studied facsimiles and tried to keep close to the composer's intentions. In contrast Willem Mengelberg conducted a shortened version of the St Matthew Passion regularly on Palm Sunday in the Concertgebouw, taking a romantic approach with choirs of 450 singers. Nevertheless the performances in Naarden and Amsterdam were initially similar, because orchestra players of the Concertgebouworkest and soloists were the same.

Charles de Wolff succeeded Van der Horst in 1965. During this period the Concertgebouw tradition was continued by Eugen Jochum. The historically informed performance, initiated by Nikolaus Harnoncourt among others, won friends within the Netherlands Bach Society, who pursued performances with smaller ensembles on period instruments. Therefore De Wolff left the Bach Society in 1983, to work with the Bachkoor Holland.

From 1983 until 2018, Jos van Veldhoven was the artistic director and conductor.

Shunsuke Sato became artistic director in June 2018 and resigned from the position in June 2023.

== Program ==
Since 1983 the Netherlands Bach Society has a group of instrumentalists and singers specialized on music of the 17th and 18th century. The Bach Society performs about 50 concerts a year, concentrating on works of Bach and his family, his contemporaries and predecessors, such as Buxtehude, Carissimi, Charpentier, Grandi, Handel, De Koninck, Kuhnau, Mazzocchi, Monteverdi, Padbrué, Ritter, Scheidt, Schein, Schütz, Sweelinck, Telemann and Weckmann.

The artistic director from 1983 to 2018 was Jos van Veldhoven, who conducts about half of the concerts. Guest conductors have included Gustav Leonhardt, Paul McCreesh, Philippe Herreweghe, Frans Brüggen, Iván Fischer and Masaaki Suzuki. To keep the experience of the St Matthew Passion "fresh not only for himself but also for the players and for audiences", guest conductors have been invited every other year. Some of them conducted the work for the first time in Naarden, such as Ton Koopman and René Jacobs. Atzo Nicolai, minister of the Netherlands who regularly attends, stated: "St. Matthew’ during Holy Week is bigger in the Netherlands than Messiah at Christmas anywhere else".

== List of conductors of The Passion ==
- 1922–1925: Johan Schoonderbeek
- 1926–1927: Siegfried Ochs
- 1929–1930: Evert Cornelis
- 1931–1959: Anthon van der Horst
- 1958: Felix de Nobel
- 1959–1964: Anthon van der Horst
- 1965-1983: Charles de Wolff
- 1984: Jos van Immerseel
- 1985: Ton Koopman
- 1990: René Jacobs
- 1991: Philippe Herreweghe
- 1992: Ton Koopman
- 1993: Jos van Veldhoven
- 1994: Iván Fischer
- 1995: Gustav Leonhardt
- 1996: René Jacobs
- 1997: Jos van Veldhoven
- 1998: Sigiswald Kuijken
- 1999: Hans-Christoph Rademann
- 2000-2001: Jos van Veldhoven
- 2002: Gustav Leonhardt
- 2003: Marcus Creed
- 2004: Jos van Veldhoven
- 2005: Masaaki Suzuki
- 2006: Jos van Veldhoven
- 2007: Richard Egarr
- 2008: Jos van Veldhoven
- 2009: Lars Ulrik Mortensen
- 2010: Jos van Veldhoven
- 2011:
- 2012:
- 2013:
- 2014: Jos van Veldhoven
- 2015: Stephan MacLeod
- 2016: Jos van Veldhoven

== Recordings ==
The ensemble recorded, among others, in 1998 Bach's St Matthew Passion, conducted by Jos van Veldhoven, with Gerd Türk as the Evangelist, Geert Smits as Vox Christi, Johannette Zomer, Andreas Scholl, Hans Jörg Mammel and Peter Kooy, released on Channel Classics Records.
