= Carel Anton Fodor =

Dutch pianist, conductor, and composer

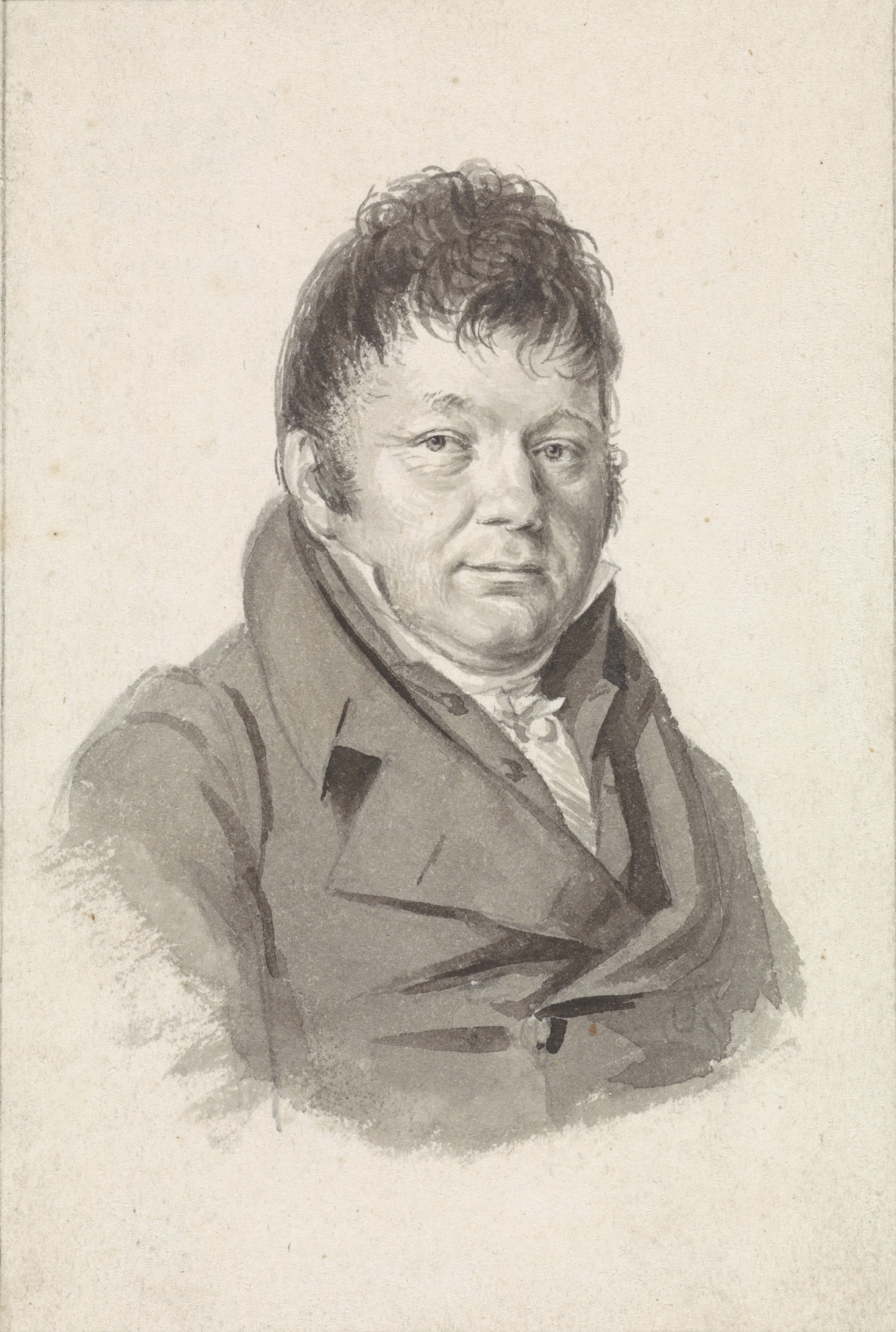
Antoine Fodor

Carel Anton Fodor or Carolus Antonius Fodor (12 April 1768 – 22 February 1846) was a Dutch pianist, conductor, and the most prominent composer of his generation in the Netherlands, writing in the manner of Joseph Haydn.

He was born in Venlo. He accompanied his older brother, Carolus Emanuel, to Paris at the age of thirteen, to complete his musical studies, perhaps visiting Russia, but returning to Amsterdam in 1790. Concertising in Amsterdam and The Hague, he built a solid reputation in Dutch musical circles as a pianistic virtuoso.

In 1798 he married Geertruida Tersteeg. At the death of Bartholomeus Ruloffs in 1801 he was named conductor of the orchestra of Felix Meritis, which he was to lead for twenty-five years. In the following year he was nominated to the position of the orchestra Eruditio Musica. In 1808 Louis Bonaparte appointed him to head the Instituut voor Wetenschappen, Literatuur en Schone Kunsten, precursor of the Koninklijke Nederlandse Academie van Wetenschappen, the Royal Netherlands Academy of Arts and Sciences. In 1811 he established, with Johann Wilhelm Wilms and some others the series of Tuesday concerts. He died, aged 77, in Amsterdam.

Anton Fodor published three symphonies (Opp. 5, 12 and 19), eight piano concertos, and a considerable output of chamber music in which the piano plays the leading role, as well as songs on Dutch texts. His opera, Numa Pompilius, has been lost.
