= Christopher Moulds =

English conductor

Christopher Moulds is an English conductor of classical and baroque operas.

== Biography ==
=== Early life and first operas ===
Moulds was born in Halifax, England where he studied piano with Fanny Waterman. From 1991 to 1995, he was an English National Opera member and then from 1994 to 1998, he became chorus master at the Glyndebourne Festival Opera where he conducted The Marriage of Figaro . Later, at the Glyndebourne Touring Opera he conducted such operas as Harrison Birtwistle's The Last Supper, La Clemenza di Tito, and Carmen.

=== 2002-2007 ===
On 5 March 2002, Christopher Moulds at the Bavarian State Opera conducted Claudio Monteverdi's Il ritorno d'Ulisse in patria and in 2003, he made his first appearance at the Netherlands Opera in Amsterdam, conducting Handel's Samson with Concerto Köln. In 2004, he recorded Glück's L'Innocenza Guistificata with Cappella Coloniensis which was released on the Deutsche Harmonia Mundi label. In 2006, he conducted Ulisse and the same year worked along with Vienna Philharmonic to conduct La Clemenza di Tito which was presented at the Salzburg Festival. The next year, he became a conductor of George Frideric Handel's Alcina which was performed at the Bayerische Staatsoper and also conducted Hercules at the Dutch National Opera.

=== 2011-2013 ===
In 2011, Moulds conducted such operas as Tamerlano of George Frideric Handel and Francesco Cavalli's La Calisto which he did for the second time since 2005. He did both works along with the Bavarian State Opera, and then performed Henry Purcell's Dido and Aeneas which he did along with Akamus and choreographer Sasha Waltz. The same year he also performed Handel Festival in Halle and then performed Don Giovanni at the Opéra National de Lyon. He also produced Mozart's The Magic Flute in collaboration with the Bolshoi Theatre of Moscow. He also conducted Akademie für Alte Musik Berlin at the Konzerthaus Berlin. He also became known for his conducting of Handel's Orlando which he did in collaboration with The Musica Viva Chamber Orchestra in Moscow and then did another of Mozart's works Così fan tutte with the Cologne Opera

In 2012, he took on Johann Sebastian Bach's Magnificat with Ballett Zürich and the same year performed Mozart's Die Entführung aus dem Serail and Cosi fan tutte at the Staatsoper Berlin. Later on, he produced Ariodante with the Musica Viva Orchestra and became involved in the Young Artists Program in the Bolshoi Theatre. Also in 2012 he conducted his first scenic oratorio The Seasons and performed a concert called The Creation which was featured at the Bregenzer Festspiele by the Wiener Symphoniker.

In 2013, Christopher Moulds conducted Dido and Aeneas and Die Entführung aus dem Serail in collaboration with the Berlin State Opera. He also conducted a new production of Mozart's La finta giardiniera in Berlin with direction by Hans Neuenfels. He collaborated with the Junge Deutsche Philharmonie on a tour to Mexico. He also planned to re-conduct 2011 operas such as The Magic Flute and Don Giovanni which he will make with the Bolshoi Opera. Also he planned to take on Georg Philipp Telemann's work Der geduldige Socrates which will be performed at the International Opera Studio Zurich and will collaborate with both Tatarstan Symphony Orchestra and Musica Viva Chamber Orchestra.

=== 2015-2018 ===
In 2015, Moulds made his successful US debut in New York performing Handel’s Semele with the Canadian Opera Company. He appeared with the Royal Opera House of Monteverdi’s Orfeo. He made his debut at the Teatro Real, Madrid with productions of Handel's Alcina. During 2015-2016, Moulds conducted a series of performances of Handel's Rodelinda in Russia at the Bolshoi Theatre.

Moulds appeared at the Teatro Colón in Buenos Aires (June 2016) and at the Rome Opera House (September 2016) conducting Sasha Waltz' production of Handel's Dido & Aeneas. In 2017, he conducted a series of performances at the Semperoper, Dresden of Mozart's Die Entführung aus dem Serail.

Recent performances have included opera La Calisto by Francesco Cavalli at the Bavarian State Opera in Munich (March–April 2018) and Mozart's Don Giovanni at Den Norske Opera in Oslo (May–June 2018). In one of his latest projects, he was working with a youth choir and the symphony orchestra of Basel (oratorio 'Elija' by Mendelssohn Bartholdy, October 2018).
