= Legende (opera) =

Legende is a Dutch-language 2006 opera in 3 acts by Peter-Jan Wagemans which premiered in 2011 at Dutch National Opera. The opera is based on the illustrated book Histoire de Mr. Vieux Bois (known in Dutch as Meester Prikkebeen and in English as “The Adventures of Mr. Obadiah Oldbuck”) written and drawn by the Swiss author Rodolphe Töpffer (1799-1846). The book combines comic stories about the titular butterfly-collector with more serious stories.

The opera was hailed by reviewers as a rare success for a Dutch-language opera.

== Recording ==
Wagemans: Legende - Marieke Steenhoek (soprano), Caroline Cartens (soprano), Corinne Romijn (mezzo), Helena Rasker (contralto), Yves Saelens (tenor), Thomas Oliemans (baritone), Elzbieta Szmytka (soprano), André Morsch (baritone), Martijn Cornet (baritone), Huub Claessens (baritone), Marcel Beekman (tenor) De Nederlandse Opera, the Chorus of De Nederlandse Opera, the Netherlands & Radio Philharmonic Orchestra. Reinbert de Leeuw Etcetera 2CD 2013 - shortened version, Act 1 complete except for 1 aria, Acts 2 and 3 considerably shortened.
