= Bacchus, Ceres en Venus =

1686 Dutch opera by Johann Schenck

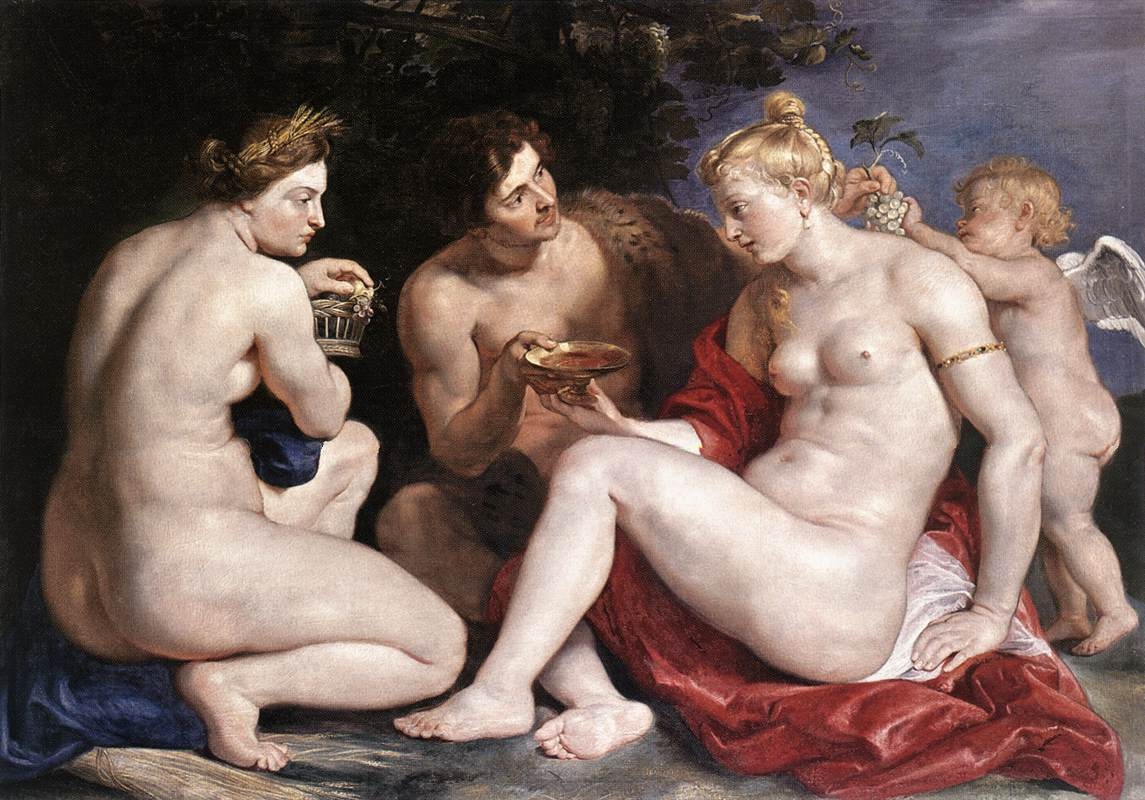
Sine Baccho et Cerere friget Venus (Ceres, Bacchus, Venus, Cupid) Rubens (1612)

Bacchus, Ceres en Venus is a 1686 Dutch-language pastoral opera by Johan Schenck around the theme Sine Cerere et Baccho friget Venus – "without Ceres and Bacchus, Venus remains cold", a theme popular with many Dutch painters of the time.

It is one of the earliest surviving Dutch-language operas, 8 years after with Carolus Hacquart's De triomfeerende Min (1678). The libretto was by Govert Bidloo an Amsterdam physician and poet. A large number of selections from the opera were published as Schenk's Op. 1 in 1687 enabling a reconstruction as the basis for a recording by Camerata Trajectina in 2006.

The opera had its (rather late) premiere at the Festival Oude Muziek Utrecht in 2011. The production was directed by Marc Krone and featured Bernard Loonen as Mercurius, Hieke Meppelink as Cerus, Jasper Schweppe as Bacchus, and Renate Arends as Venus.
