= Obrecht =

Obrecht is a patronymic surname. Obrecht was a Germanic given name derived from Od-brecht, meaning "famed for his heritage". Notable people with the surname include:

- Jacob Obrecht (c. 1457/58 – 1505), Flemish Renaissance composer
- Hermann Obrecht (1882–1940), Swiss politician
- André Obrecht (1899–1985), French executioner

== See also ==
- Obrecht Pyramid
