= Céline Scheen =

21st-century Belgian singer

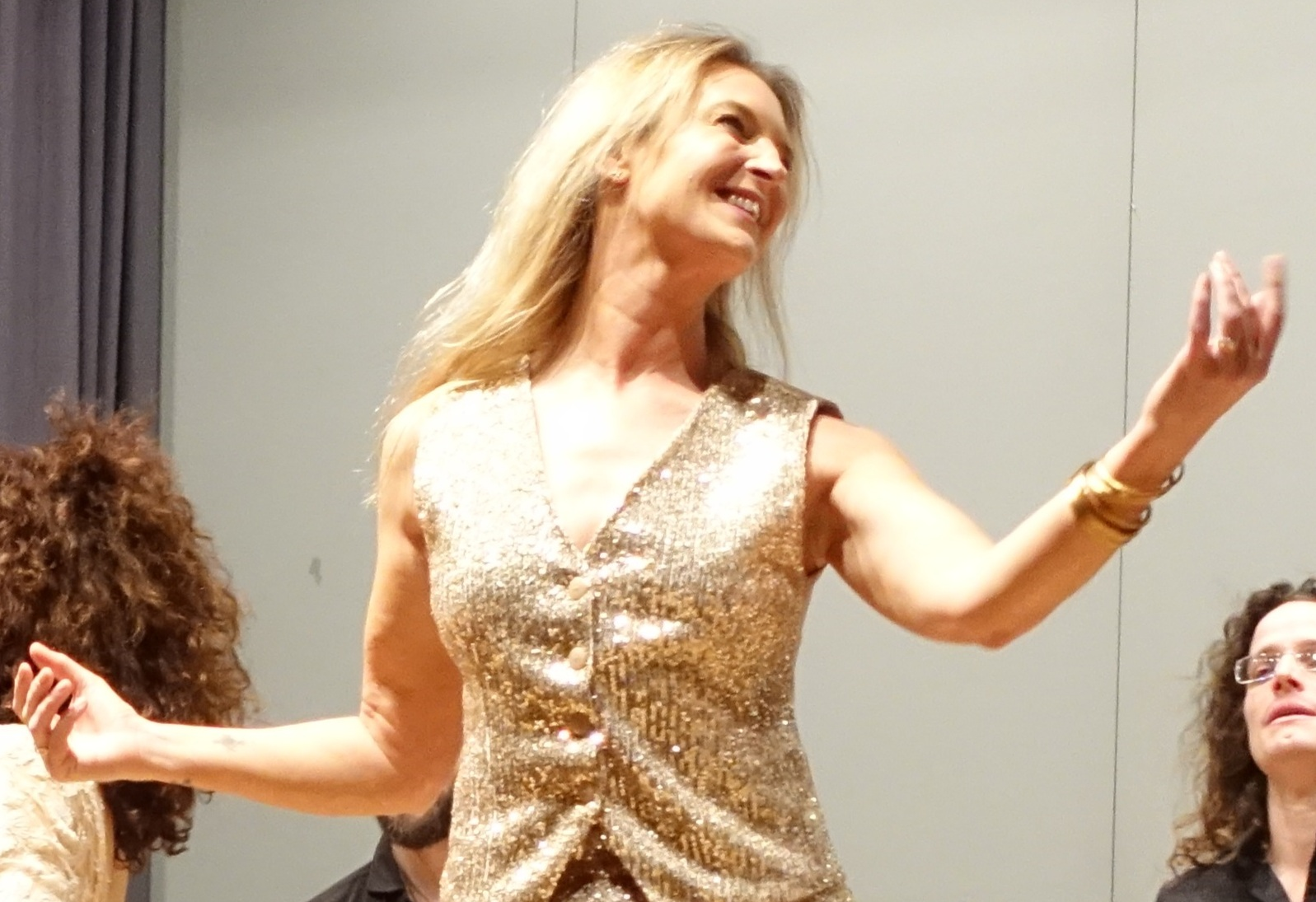

Background information
- Born: 15 March 1976 (age 50); Verviers, Belgium
- Genres: Classical
- Occupation: Opera singer (soprano)
- Instrument: Vocals

Céline Scheen (born 1976 in Verviers, Belgium) is a Belgian classical soprano.

Scheen began her vocal studies with Annie Frantz. In 1996, she entered the Royal Academy of Mons and obtained a First Prize in the class of Marcel Vanaud. She then received a degree in song and methodology of song at the Royal Academy of Brussels. In 1998, she obtained the Nany Philippart's grant with Chapelle musicale Reine Élisabeth. For two years, she worked in the class of Vera Rózsa at the Guildhall School of Music in London, where she obtained an advanced degree in vocal performance. She also takes masterclasses with Jean-Paul Fouchécourt, Monique Zanetti and Helmut Deutsch.

Scheen has sung the roles of Lucy in The Telephone, or L'Amour à trois by Gian Carlo Menotti, Thérèse in the Les mamelles de Tirésias by Francis Poulenc, the First Lady and Papagena in Wolfgang Amadeus Mozart's Die Zauberflöte, Frasquita in Carmen, Vespetta in Pimpinone by Georg Philipp Telemann, Grilletta in Lo Speziale by Joseph Haydn, and Zerlina in Mozart's Don Giovanni. She appeared with La Monnaie in Christoph Willibald Gluck's Alceste, Francesco Cavalli's Eliogabalo, and Mozart's Die Zauberflöte under the direction of René Jacobs. She sang in concerts in the Petite Messe Solennelle of Gioachino Rossini, Carl Orff's Carmina Burana, the Requiem of Gabriel Fauré, the Coronation Mass and the Great Mass in C minor by Mozart, and Johann Sebastian Bach's Johannes Passion with the groups Il Fondamento, Ricercar Consort, Café Zimmermann, La Fénice, La Cetra d'Orfeo and Musica Antiqua Köln.

Scheen was a member of the World Youth Choir from 1994 to 1996, which enabled her to make rounds in Latin America, Canada, Estonia, Latvia, Finland and Sweden. Scheen was among the soloists invited to perform at the Abbaye aux Dames during the Festival de Saintes.

== Recordings ==
- Cyril Auvity, Orphée, Céline Scheen, Eurydice, Floriane Hasler, Proserpine, Etienne Bazola, Pluton, Ensemble Desmarest, conducted by Ronan Khalil (Glossa, 2018)

In 1999, Scheen recorded the music of Gérard Corbiau's film Le Roi Danse for Deutsche Grammophon with the ensemble Musica Antiqua Köln under the direction of Reinhard Goebel. Her performance in Nicolaus à Kempis: Symphoniæ continued her trend in baroque music. In 2006, she sang for Carolus Hacquart: Cantiones & Sonate, alongside two songs Stephan Van Dyck and Dirk Snellings. Later that year, she featured in two songs from Paolo Pandolfo's CD, Improvisando. In 2018, she is Euridice in Charpentier's La Descente d'Orphée aux enfers H.488 with the Ensemble Desmarest conducted by Ronan Khalil (CD Glossa).

== Sources ==
- Brussel Nieuws, "Céline Scheen, een hart voor oude muziek", 29 March 2010 (interview in Dutch)
- Holland, Bernard, "The Flute Is Awfully Nice, Tamino, but Check Out That Astral Sketchbook", New York Times, 11 April 2007
