= Venus, Cupid, Bacchus and Ceres, 1612 =

Painting by Peter Paul Rubens

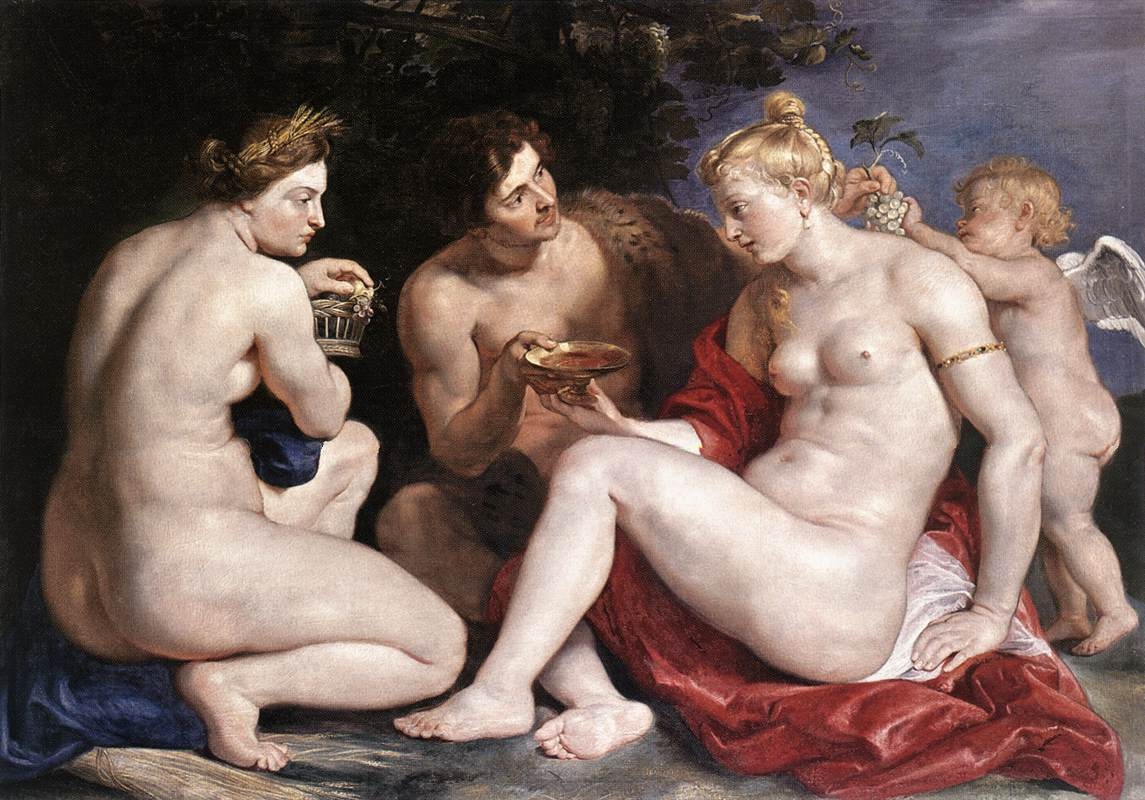
Venus, Cupid, Bacchus, and Ceres

Venus, Cupid, Bacchus, and Ceres is a painting that was completed by Peter Paul Rubens between 1612–1613. It is a depiction of four figures from Roman Mythology. The painting is currently residing at the Staatliche Museen in Berlin.

The painting was inspired from the phrase "without Ceres and Bacchus, Venus would freeze" and was completed after his 8 year tenure at Duke Vincenzo Gonzaga of Mantua' court in northern italy, which gave him a familiarity with Roman mythological themes.

== See also ==
- Minerva Protecting Peace from Mars
