= Evgeny Sviridov (violinist) =

Russian violinist (b. 1989)

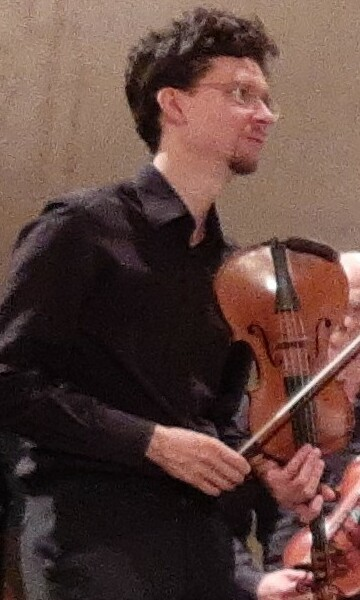
- Sviridov at the 2022 Rheingau Musik Festival at Eberbach Abbey
- Born: 1989 (age 36–37); Saint Petersburg, Soviet Union
- Education: Saint Petersburg Conservatory; Musikhochschule Köln
- Occupations: Classical violinist; Academic teacher
- Organizations: Concerto Köln; Hochschule für Künste Bremen
- Awards: Yehudi-Menuhin Competition; Leipzig Bach Competition
- Website: www.evgeny-sviridov.com

Evgeny Sviridov (born 1989) is a Russian violinist and academic teacher based in Germany who turned from the Russian romantic style to the Baroque violin which he studied in Cologne. He has been concertmaster for the ensemble Concerto Köln beginning in 2015, and has lectured Baroque violin at the Hochschule für Künste Bremen from 2018.

== Life and career ==
Born in Saint Petersburg in 1989, Sviridov received early musical training first at the piano, then the violin. He studied violin at the Saint Petersburg Conservatory. As a student, he won violin competitions including the Yehudi-Menuhin in Cardiff, the Jascha Heifetz Competition in Vilnius, and the Premio Paganini in Genova. He won in 2010, still with the modern violin, the Leipzig Bach Competition.

The award motivated him to study the Baroque violin, pursued at the Musikhochschule Köln from 2015 to 2017. In 2016 and 2017, he achieved first prizes and the audience prize at the Concours Corneille Rouen and Musica Antiqua Bruges in Bruges. In 2018, he received the prize of North Rhine-Westphalia for young artists.

At the same time, he has been concertmaster for Concerto Köln beginning in 2015. He has also collaborated with Ensemble 1700 and the Bremer Barockorchester, among others. He founded and has led the ensemble Ludus Instrumentalis. He played as soloist and ensemble player at festivals including Bachfest Leipzig, Thüringer Bachwochen and in Potsdam, Cremona and Brussels, in halls such as the Concertgebouw, Kölner Philharmonie and Konzerthaus Berlin.

He recorded sonatas by Johann Sebastian Bach and Heinrich Ignaz Franz Biber in 2011, sonatas by Antonio Vivaldi, and sonatas by Giuseppe Tartini and his five violin concertos. The 2018 Tartini Sonatas recording, with cellist Davit Melkonyan and harpsichordist Stanislav Gres, was awarded the Preis der Deutschen Schallplattenkritik. A reviewer summarised:

Evgeny Sviridov is a representative of a young generation of violinists, playing on period instruments and combining musicianship with musicological research ... These are strongly rhetorical and gestural performances of music which not only requires great technical skills, but also a thorough understanding of the aesthetic ideals of Tartini.

Sviridov has lectured Baroque violin at the Hochschule für Künste Bremen from 2018.

He has played a violin built by Gennaro Gagliano in Naples in 1732. It was given to him on loan in 2015 by the Amsterdam foundation Jumpstart.
