= Obrecht Pyramid =

Mountain in Antarctica

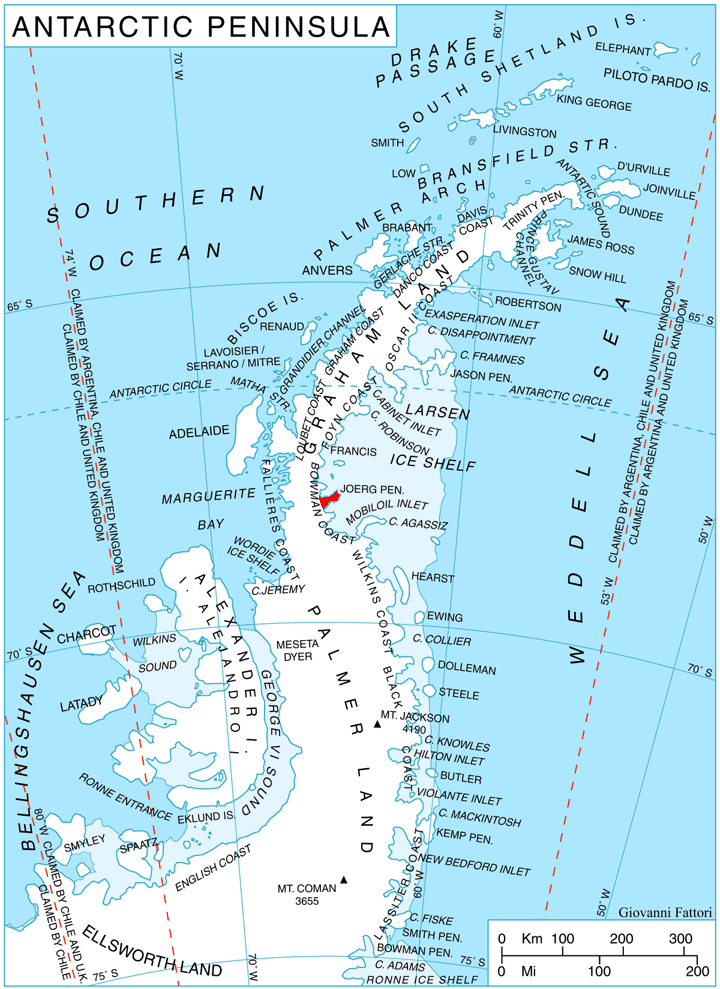
Location of Joerg Peninsula in Graham Land, Antarctic Peninsula.

Obrecht Pyramid (68°9′S 65°32′W) is a pyramidal peak (about 600 m) on the north shore of Joerg Peninsula, Bowman Coast. The peak was photographed from the air by the United States Antarctic Service (USAS), 1940, and was surveyed by Falkland Islands Dependencies Survey (FIDS), 1946–48. The name "Punta Alberto Obrecht" after Alberto Obrecht, former Director of the Chilean Astronomical Observatory and a member of the Comision Antartica Chilena of 1906, was applied to this feature on a Chilean hydrographic chart of 1947. An amended form of the original name has been approved.
