= Akira Nishimura =

Japanese composer (1953–2023)

- 西村 朗
- Born: 8 September 1953; Osaka, Japan
- Died: 7 September 2023 (aged 69)
- Occupation: Composer

Akira Nishimura (西村 朗, Nishimura Akira; 8 September 1953 – 7 September 2023) was a Japanese composer from Osaka.

== Biography ==
Nishimura studied composition and musical theory on a graduate course at Tokyo National University of Fine Arts and Music. He also studied Asian traditional music, religion, aesthetics, cosmology and the heterophonic concepts, all of which had a lasting influence on his music.

Nishimura won several national and international awards, including the 36th Suntory Music Award (2004), and was commissioned by many overseas music festivals. His style consistently relied on a modal sense. When Heterophony for String Quartet was performed for the first time, he felt strongly that the tone selection at the beginning of the piece was strange, so much so that he immediately rewrote it into a modal version. Along with Joe Kondo, Nishimura has a wealth of recordings of his own works, but Nishimura also has many important works that are not included in his discography, such as Guren and From the Edge of Manra. In his later years, he wrote new works for the world of wind instruments.

Nishimura was the judge at the 2007 Tōru Takemitsu composition award.

Akira Nishimura died from jaw cancer on 7 September 2023, one day short of his 70th birthday.

== Works ==
=== Operas ===
- Asters (premiered February 2019)
- Hot Rain in August, television opera (1986).

=== Works with orchestra ===
- Mantra of the Light, for female choir and orchestra
- Prelude (1974);
- 2 symphonies (1976, 1979);
- Mutazioni (1977);
- 2 piano concertos (1979; 1982);
- Nostalgia (1983);
- Heterophony for 2 Pianos and Orch. (1987);
- Navel of the Sun for Hichiriki and Orch. (1989);
- Cello Concerto (1990);
- Into the Light of the Eternal Chaos (1990);
- Tapas, concerto for Bassoon, Percussion, and Strings (1990);
- A Ring of Lights, double concerto for Violin, Piano, and Orch. (1991);
- Music of Dawn for Japanese Instruments and Orch. (1991);
- Hoshi-Mandala (1992);
- Astral Concerto: A Mirror of Lights for Ondes Martenot and Orch. (1992);
- Birds Heterophony (1993);
- Birds in Light (1994);
- Fugaku (1994);
- A Mirror of Mist for Violin and String Ensemble (1995);
- Melos Aura (1995);
- Vision in Twilight (1995);
- Canticle of Light (1996);
- Flame and Shadow, viola concerto (1996);
- Monody (1996);
- Padma Incarnation (1997);
- A Stream—After Dark for Piano and Chamber Orch. (1997);
- River of Karuna I for Violin and Strings (1997) and II for Clarinet and Chamber Orch. (1997);
- After Glow, violin concerto (1998);
- Corps d'arc-en-ciel for chamber orch.(2008);
- Serpent in the Sky for Yokobue and Orch.;
- Vision and Mantra for orch.;
- Kavira for clarinet and orch.

== Chamber works ==
- 3 string quartets (Heterophony, 1975, rev. 1987; Pulse of the Lights, 1992; Avian, 1997);
- Kecak for 6 Percussionists (1979);
- Tāla for 6 Percussionists (1982);
- Khyal for Flute and Piano (1985);
- Mãtra for Marimba, Timpani, and 5 Percussionists (1985);
- Gaka I: Concrete of Heterophony for Shakuhachi, Flute, Koto, and Cello (1987), III: Generalize of Heterophony for Violin and 2 Pianos (1987), and IV: Heterophonyon Drone for Violin and Cello (1988);
- Padma in Meditation for 6 Percussionists (1988);
- Timpani Concerto for Timpani and 5 Percussionists (1988);
- Kāla for Marimba and 6 Percussionists (1989);
- Organums for Flute, Clarinet, Violin, Piano, and Vibraphone (1989);
- Pipa for 3 Guitars (1989);
- Honey of Lights for Nonet (1990);
- Voice of the Sun for Marimba, Oboe, Soprano Saxophone, and 2 Percussionists (1991);
- Ektāl for 3 Marimba Players and 2 Percussionists (1992);
- Silver Cord for Ondes Martenot and Cello (1993);
- Mirror of the Moon for Yokobue and 6 Percussionists (1995);
- Fragment and Echo for Piano Trio (1996);
- Aquatic Aura for Clarinet and Piano (1996);
- Light of Padma for Violin and Organ (1996);
- Duologue for Timpani and Piano (1996);
- Concerto for Flute, Winds, and Percussion (1997);
- Lamento for Saxophone and Piano (1997);
- Halos for Trumpet and Piano (1998);
- Utpala for clarinet (2009);
- Bardo I, quintet for clarinet and strings.

== Piano works ==
- Sonata (1972);
- Tritrope (1978);
- Penguin Suite (1983; rev. 1989);
- Vibrancy Mirrors for 2 Pianos (1985);
- Because (1991);
- Mirror of the Stars (1992).

== Vocal works ==
- Ceremony for 2 Sopranos and Orch. (1973);
- Gaka II: Abstraction of Heterophony for Soprano, Clarinet, Violin, and 2 Pianos (1987);
- Mana II for Mezzo-soprano and 5 Percussionists (1989);
- Mantra of the Light for Women's Chorus and Orch. (1993);
- 5 Lyrics from The Blue Cat for Women's Chorus, Clarinet, Violin, Cello, and Piano (1996).

== Other activities ==
- Tokyo College of Music: professor (composition)

== See also ==
- Music of Japan
