= Cornelis Schuyt =

Dutch organist and composer

- Born: Cornelis Floriszoon Schuyt; 1557; Leiden, Seventeen Provinces
- Died: 9 June 1616 (aged 58–59); Leiden, Dutch Republic
- Resting place: Pieterskerk
- Occupations: Composer; Organist
- Notable work: Works

Cornelis Floriszoon Schuyt (1557 – 9 June 1616) was a Dutch organist and Renaissance composer.

== Life ==
Cornelis Floriszoon Schuyt was born in Leiden in 1557. He was the son of Floris Corneliszoon Schuyt (1529/30–1601), the organist of two churches in Leiden, the Pieterskerk and the Hooglandse Kerk.

Schuyt was introduced to Renaissance music. on a study trip to Italy.

In 1593, alongside his father, Schuyt became an organist in the Pieterskerk and the Hooglandse Kerk, . After his father's death in 1601, he became the Pieterskerk's main organist.

Schuyt published four volumes with compositions, with three volumes of madrigals. None of his organ music has survived.

Schuyt died on 9 June 1616 and was buried in the Pieterskerk, a church in Leiden.

== Remembrance ==
His name is written in the main hall of the Concertgebouw in Amsterdam, Netherlands and the Cornelis Schuytstraat (52.355215°N 4.87123°E) in Amsterdam-Zuid is named after him.

== Works ==
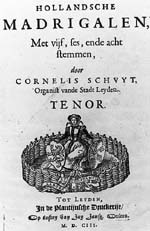
Title page of Hollandsche madrigalen met vijf, ses, ende acht stemmen (1603)

- Il primo libro de madrigali a cinque voci (1600)
- Hollandsche madrigalen met vijf, ses, ende acht stemmen (1603)
- Hymeneo, overo Madrigali nuptiali et altri amorosi (1611)
- Dodeci Padovane, et altretante Gagliarde Composte nelli dodeci modi (1611)
