= Zemire en Azor =

Semi-opera by Bartholomeus Ruloffs

Zemire en Azor (Zémire and Azor) is a 1784 semi-opera, a musical play "with spectacles and a ballet" by Bartholomeus Ruloffs. It is one of the most successful attempts to create a Dutch-language opera in the 18th century. Zemire en Azor was, for its time, a box-office success, with thirteen performances. Ruloffs composed new music to a Dutch libretto, which had been translated from French, based on Marmontel's La Belle et la bête (Beauty and the Beast).
