= Charles de Wolff =

Dutch organist and conductor

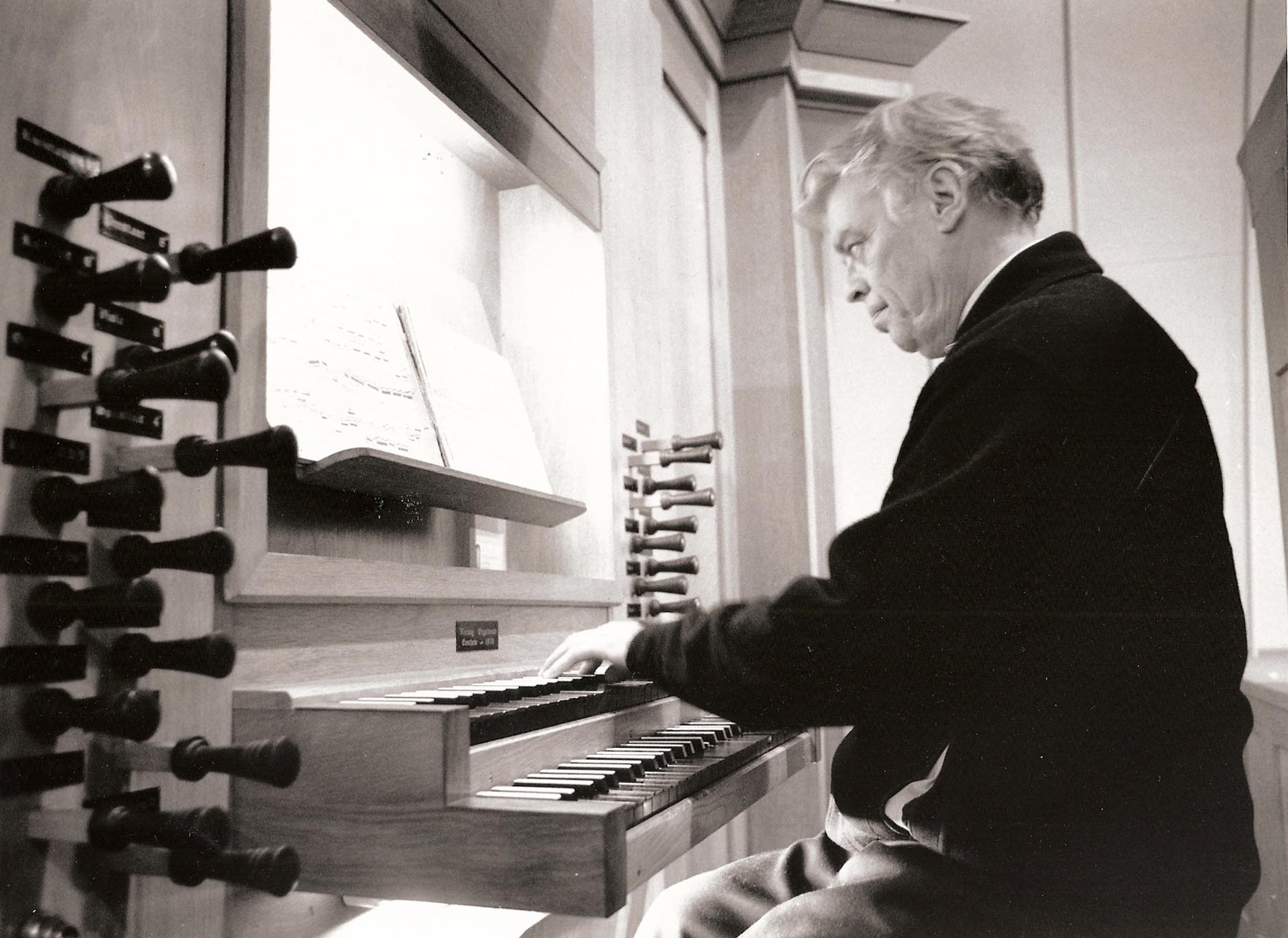
Charles de Wolff

Charles de Wolff (19 June 1932 – 23 November 2011) was a Dutch organist and conductor. He conducted the Netherlands Bach Society from 1965 until 1983. After 1983 he worked with the Bachkoor Holland.
