= Concerto Köln =

Musical ensemble specialising 18th and 19th century music

- Orchestra
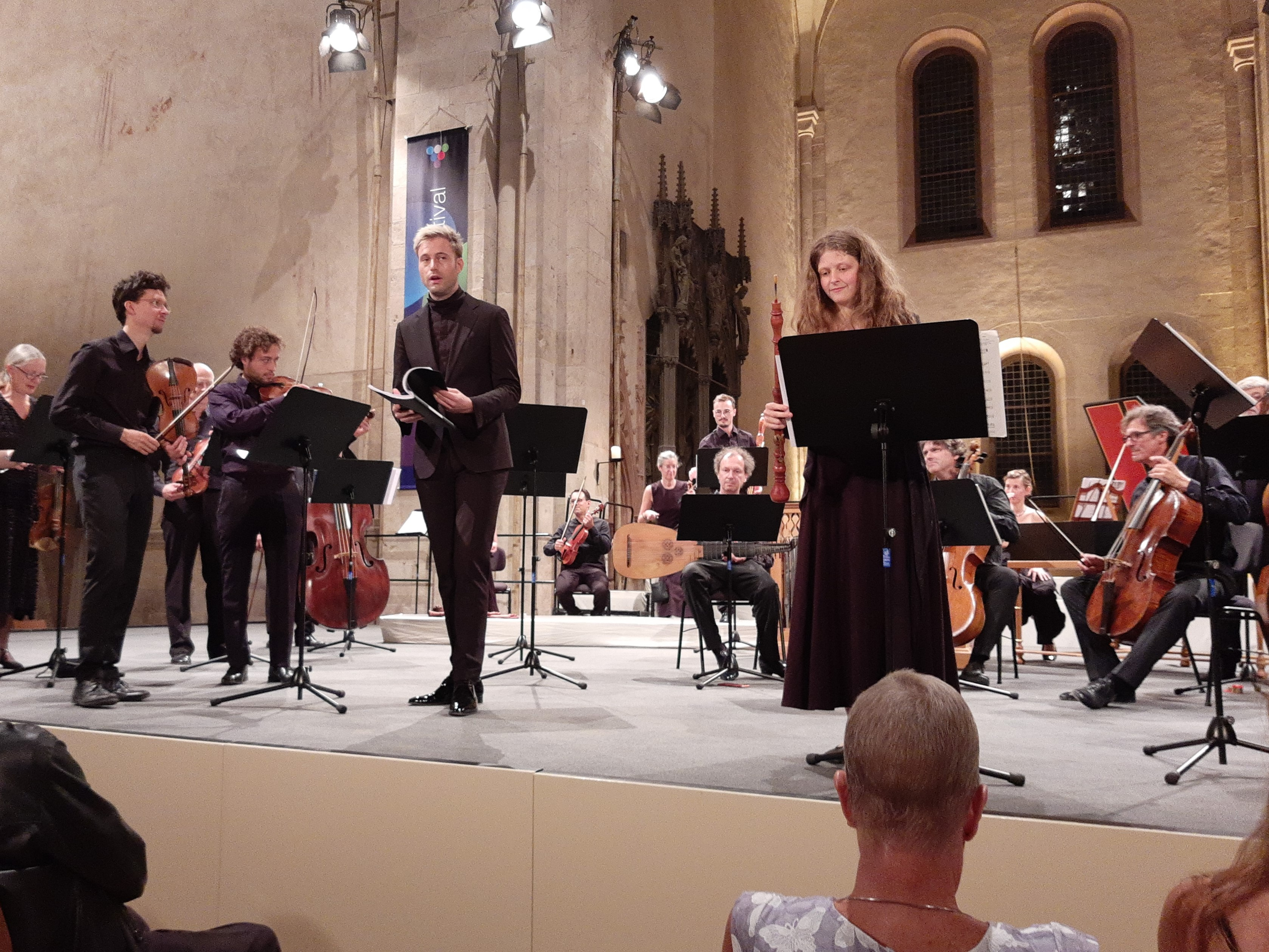
- In concert at the 2022 Rheingau Musik Festival at Eberbach Abbey
- Founded: 1985
- Location: Cologne
- Principal conductor: Evgeny Sviridov
- Website: www.concerto-koeln.de/1733.html

Concerto Köln is an ensemble specialising in music of the eighteenth and nineteenth centuries.

The group formed in 1985, one of many groups associated with the surging interest in period instruments in that decade. Its members consisted mainly of recent graduates of conservatories from across Europe. They began touring the Continent, often making appearances at major festivals. In 1992, they founded the Cologne Festival of Early Music with the aid of Deutschland Radio. They receive no government subsidies, and do not have a permanent conductor, though the group has an artistic director, Martin Sandhoff. Among the concert masters is Evgeny Sviridov.

Their repertory stretches from early Baroque on through the Classical Era and as far into the nineteenth century as Wagner. They have also done a number of collaborative works, such as a disc juxtaposing Turkish folk music with pieces in a Turkish style by composers such as Mozart. They have recorded frequently with, among others, René Jacobs, Daniel Harding, Louis Langrée, David Stern, Ivor Bolton, Marcus Creed, Christopher Moulds, and Evelino Pidò.

== Discography ==
The ensemble has released more than 50 recordings, including the following:

- 1987: Antonio Vivaldi; Giovanni Battista Sammartini; Pietro Antonio Locatelli - Six Concerti Venetiens
- 1987: Gluck - Echo et Narcisse (Harmonia Mundi France)
- 1990: Bach - Auf schmetternde Töne, BWV 207a, Schleicht, spielende Wellen, BWV 206
- 1991: Handel - Giulio Cesare
- 1992: Francesco Durante - Concerti
- 1994: Gaetano Brunetti - Sinfonien
- 1998: Carl Heinrich Graun - Cleopatra & Cesare
- 1999: John Field - Piano Concertos Nos. 2 & 3, with Andreas Staier
- 1999: Mozart - Così fan tutte
- 2002: Uri Caine - Diabelli Variations (Winter & Winter)
- 2003: Dream of the Orient. Concerto Köln & Ensemble Sarband (Archiv Produktion/Deutsche Grammophon)
- 2004: Mozart - Le nozze di Figaro (Grammy Award, Choc du Monde de la Musique; Edison Classical Music Award; Gramophone Record of the Year 2004; Preis der deutschen Schallplattenkritik)
- 2005: The Waltz. Concerto Köln & Ensemble Sarband (Echo Klassik)
- 2009: Henri-Joseph Rigel - Symphonies. (Echo Klassik)
- 2010: Antonio Caldara - Arias with Philippe Jaroussky (Virgin Classics/EMI)
- 2010: Bach - Orchestral Suites
- 2012: Vinci - Artaserse
- 2013: Karneval anno dazumal (live)
