= Henricus Rosaeus =

Henricus Rosaeus (1577–1637) was a Dutch minister. He was a leading Counter-Remonstrant preacher, serving in the Hague, though he was banned from preaching there, and his followers would walk to Rijswijk to hear him each Sunday: they were called "mud beggars". H. J. Meijerink describes him as having a "warm, choleric character" and showing himself to be a "zealous Counter-Remonstrant and a defender of the old faith".
