= Bartholomeus Ruloffs =

Dutch conductor and composer

Bartholomeus Ruloffs (October 1741 – 13 May 1801) was a Dutch conductor and composer.

Ruloffs was born and died in Amsterdam. His duties as conductor included conducting the city's Felix Meritis concerts. His new music for Zemire en Azor, a Singspiel with scenery and ballets, for Pieter Pijpers' 1784 Dutch version of the play by Jean-François Marmontel was a significant early step towards producing an opera in Dutch.

== Selected works ==
- Les décréations d'Apollon on les trois symphonies a deux violons, taille et basse obligé, deux flutes et deux corni de chasse tiré des nouveaux opéras français. printed by J.J. Hummel in Amsterdam.
- Music for Zemire en Azor (1784), one of the earliest operas in the Netherlands
- Six sonatas for keyboard (Markordt, 1769)
- Derde stukje der muzikale verlustiging (Smit, 1772)
- Cantate historique (1777)
- Jephta (Kruyff, 1779) a theatrical Singspiel
- Marsch-retraite, for the burger company of watch district 40, Hieronimus van Slingelandt
- Beurtgezangen, Elk zyn beurt is niet te veel (1785)
- Proeve van kleine gedichten voor kinderen; text Hieronymus van Alphen (Gerbrand Roos, 1790)
- Tot middernacht (List of tegenlist), Singspiel (Helders en Mars, 1791)
- Willem Tell (1791)
- In triomf (1795)
- De bruiloft van Kloris en Roosje
