= Abraham Alewijn =

Dutch jurist and poet

- Born: 16 November 1664; Amsterdam
- Died: 4 October 1721 (aged 56); Batavia
- Occupations: Jurist; Poet; Playwright
- Spouse: Sophia Beukers (m. 1704)

Abraham Alewijn (16 October 1664, in Amsterdam – 4 October 1721, in Batavia, Dutch East Indies) was a jurist and in his time a well-respected poet, who distinguished himself above his contemporary poets, as evidenced from his Zede- en Harpzangen, which had its third printing in quarto in 1713. But he made himself especially valuable as a writer of comedies. His play poetry exists of:

- Amarillis, play with a happy ending, Amsterdam, 1693.
- Hardersspel. Amsterdam, 1699.
- Hardersspel honouring Corn. Pruimer. Amsterdam, 1702.
- De bedrooge woekeraar, comedy. Amsterdam, 1702.
- Latona, of de verandering der Boeren in kikvorschen. Amsterdam, 1703, illustrated.
- Philippyn, Mr. Koppelaar, comedy. Amsterdam, 1707.
- Beslikte Swaantje en drooge Fobert, of de Boere rechtbank, comedy. Amsterdam, 1715.
- De Puiterveensche Helleveeg, of beslikte Swaantje aan den tap, comedy. Amsterdam, 1720.
- Jan Los, of den bedroogen Oostindievaer, comedy. Amsterdam, 1721.
- Orpheus Hellevaart om Euridice, musical play. Amsterdam. illustrated.

The style in all these plays is natural, loose and flowing, but some of the expressions are a bit rude, which caused them to no longer being played. He also knew, when needed by the subject, to express himself forcefully. Furthermore, he has left us a work in manuscript form which was, together with the drawings for the illustrations, completely ready for publishing; it was found in the rich collection of books by Lower Dutch poets owned by C.P.E. Robidé van der Aa, and is titled: A. Alewyns Simmebeelden, bestaande in 22 prenten, door den schrijver uitgevonden, wijders door denselven met vaarzen en zedekundige redeneeringen op yder prent toepasselijk verrijkt, en verders gestoffeerd met veele aanmerkelijke en gedenkwaardige aloude geschiedenissen en zinspreuken, uit aanzienlijke geloofwaardige schrijvers en zedeleeraars getrokken, zijnde de prenten in koper gesneden door Pieter van Bergen. (A. Alewyns Simmebeelden, with 22 illustrations, invented by the author, further enriched with verse and decency reasonings on every illustration, and further filled with many remarkable and memorable ancient histories and sayings, culled from famous trustworthy writers and preachers, with the illustrations engraved in copper by Pieter van Bergen.) The last sentence seems to indicate that only the death of Alewijn prevented the publication, as he had even already hired an engraver. The prose in this work shows the writer's great knowledge of literature, fun and ingeniosity, while the verses beneath each illustration, each time figuring monkeys as the protagonists, are not unworthy witnesses of his poetic capabilities. Furthermore, with J. Collé he adapted Tesóuro dos Vocábulos das dúas Linguas, Portuguéza e Flamenga. Woordenschat der twee Taalen, Portug. et Nederd. Amsterdam 1718. 8o. (Dictionary of the two languages, Portuguese and Dutch).
