= Carolus Hacquart =

Flemish composer and musician

Carolus Hacquart (the latinised form of his original name: Carel Hacquart) (c. 1640 - after 1686) was a Flemish composer and musician. He became one of the most important 17th-century composers in the Dutch Republic and possibly also worked in England.

== Life ==
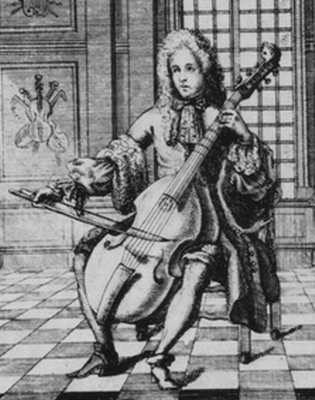
Carolus Hacquart, as represented in one of the editions of his music

Hacquart was born in Bruges around 1640. He received his education, comprising Latin and composition as well as viola da gamba, lute and organ, most probably in his native town. Records referring to a 'Charges Akkert' who is accepted in September 1650 as a choirboy in the St. Salvator's Church in Bruges suggest he may have been born later than 1640. His brother Philips is accepted the same year as a choirboy in another church in Bruges. At the end of the 1650s both brothers are recorded in Ghent where they are choirboys in different churches.

Attracted by the growth of musical life of the rich citizens of the Dutch Republic, his brother Philips moved to Amsterdam around 1670 where he was joined by Carolus a few years later. It seems the brothers never held official positions and both gained a living as free-lance musicians. In Calvinist Holland there was little interest in church music and the aristocracy generally was not supportive of the arts. The brothers therefore became musicians and music teachers to the well-off Dutch burghers.

Carolus moved in 1679 to The Hague, where he taught and organized concerts with the support of the elderly Constantijn Huygens, who was the chief councillor of William III, the stadtholder and future king of England. Thanks to Huygens' recommendation of Hacquart to John Maurice of Nassau, Hacquart could organise weekly concerts in the famous Mauritshuis. Hacquart was also an organist at the Old-Catholic church of The Hague.

To earn a living, Hacquart gave music classes to many wealthy patricians such as lawyers and other notables who made music in their spare time. One of his students was Willem Hoogendorp, the future mayor of Rotterdam to whom he dedicated his sonatas Harmonia Parnassia Sonatarum. In 1686 Hacquart composed 12 suites under the title Chelys which he dedicated to two of his students, the lawyers Pittenius and Kuysten. The words 'Chelys' is Greek for 'lyre'. In the 17th century it became the Latin term for any stringed instrument but in particular the viola da gamba.

Little is known about his life after 1686 and there is no trace of his life in the Dutch Republic after that date. Based on the possible identification with a person with a similar name (Charles Hakert) who was identified as a native of Holland in a document dated 16 July 1697, it is believed that he had then moved to England. The fact that the composer Gottfried Finger who worked at the English court owned a copy of Hacquart's Chelys suggests that the two composers may have worked together in England.

Hacquart died possibly in 1701.

== Work ==
Hacquart is the composer of the first opera in the Dutch language with the title De triomfeerende Min (Triumphant Love). The opera was based on a text by Dirk Buysero which he wrote on the occasion of the Treaty of Nijmegen of 1678. The opera was not performed during Hacquart's lifetime. The first known performance dates to 1920 when the piece was performed in Arnhem. Unfortunately most of the music of this opera has to be considered lost.

Three other publications of his music have survived. His first published work is the Cantiones Sacrae, which consists of religious pieces for vocal soloists, choir and instrumentalists which could be sung by both Catholics and Protestants (1674). His second published work is the Harmonia Parnassia Sonatarum', which is a collection of 10 sonatas for two or three violins and basso continuo (1686).

His third published work: Chelys (1686). The work Chelys consists of 12 suites that can be performed by one viol, two viols or one viol with a basso continuo accompaniment. Only one copy of the gamba part of Chelys survives. The bass part is lost.

The work of Hacquart belongs to the best music composed in the 17th century Netherlands. In particular the instrumental sonatas from his opus 2, Harmonia Parnassia Sonatarum stand out.

Copies of Hacquart's works are kept in the library of Durham Cathedral, England.

== Selected discography ==
- Carolus Hacquart, Chelys – Guido Balestracci and others, CD Symphonía (2004)
- Carolus Hacquart, Cantiones & Sonate, Ensemble Clématis, with the soprano Céline Scheen, CD Musica Ficta (2006)
- The Galaxy Recordings Dutch Music for viola da gamba from the 17th century: Johann Schenk, Christiaen Herwich en Ph. Hacquart, The Spirit of Gambo (2006)
- Carolus Hacquart, Le maistre de musique, Ricercar Consort, CD Flora 0705 (2007)
- Carolus Hacquart, The Triumph of Love / De Triomfeerende Min, Camerata Trajectina, CD Globe 6069 (2012)
