= Johannes Schenck =

Dutch musician and composer

Sonata IV for Unaccompanied Viola da Gamba from the Vienna Manuscript, Österreichische Nationalbibliothek Wien, Codex Mus.Hs.16598 (ca.1695)
Performed by Phillip W. Serna, Viol

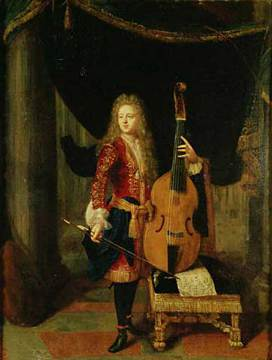
Portrait of Johann Schenck by Constantijn Netscher.jpg

Johannes Schenck (or Johan Schenk, 3 June 1660–after 1712) was a Dutch musician and composer.

Schenck was born in Amsterdam and baptized in a Catholic hidden church. He became a renowned virtuoso viola da gamba player.

His compositions included music for a Dutch Singspiel, Bacchus, Ceres en Venus, which can claim to be the first opera in Dutch, and from which songs were published in 1687, as well as works for the viola da gamba. Around 1696 he accepted an appointment to the court of Johann Wilhelm, Elector Palatine in Düsseldorf. After Johann Wilhelm's death in 1716, the electoral court moved to Mannheim.

There is some uncertainty about the date of Schenck's death as there is no mention found in the Düsseldorf Protestant church records or parish and cemetery records in Amsterdam. His last known published work appeared in 1712. He is no longer mentioned in the list of court musicians compiled in 1717.

== Works ==
- op. 1 Eenige gezangen, uit de opera von Bacchus, Ceres en Venus, Amsterdam, heirs of Paul Matthys, Author, 1687. (27 arias for voice and b.c.)
- op. 2 Tyd en Konst-Oeffeningen, Amsterdam, Pierre Pickaert, 1688. (15 sonatas for viola da gamba and b.c.)
- op. 3 Il Giardino Armonico, Amsterdam, Le Chevalier, 1691. (12 sonatas for 2 violins, viola da gamba and b.c.)
- op. 4 C. van Eekes koninklyke harpliederen, Amsterdam, Author, circa 1694. (150 psalms for 1 or 2 voices, 2 viols ad libitum and b.c.). Incomplete
- op. 5 Zang-wyze op M: Gargons uitbreiding over 't Hooglied Salomons, Amsterdam, 1696. (63 arias for 1 voice and bc)
- op. 6 Scherzi musicali, Amsterdam, Roger, n.d. [circa 1698]. (Suites for viola da gamba and b.c. ad libitum)
- op. 7 Suonate a violino e violone o cimbalo, Amsterdam, n.d. [1699]
- op. 8 Le Nymphe di Rheno, Amsterdam, Roger, n.d. [circa 1702]. (12 sonata-suites for 2 viola da gamba)
- op. 9 L'Echo du Danube, Amsterdam, Roger, n.d. [circa 1704]. (4 sonatas for viola da gamba and b.c., 2 sonatas for viola da gamba solo)
- op. 10 Les fantaisies bisarres de la goutte, Amsterdam, Roger, Le Cène, n.d. [1711/2]. (Suites for viola da gamba and b.c). Viola da gamba part lost
- 2 sonatas for viola da gamba solo, manuscript, Austria, Vienna, National Library, ms. 16598.
- 9 movements in tablature for 2 viole da gamba, manuscript, Norway, Trondheim University Library, XA HA Mus 1:1 e 1:2

These and further manuscripts (in GB-DRc, GB-Ob, D-Wd, S-Ska) contain also copies of the aforesaid printed editions.

== Recordings ==
- Le Nymphe di Rheno, Wieland Kuijken & François Joubert-Caillet (Ricercar RIC336)
- Nymphs of the Rhine, Vol. 1 (Naxos CD 8.554414)
- Nymphs of the Rhine, Vol. 2 (Naxos CD 8.554415)
- Bacchus, Ceres en Venus Camerata Trajectina, Globe.
- Tyd en Konst-Oeffeningen, Op.2, Recondita Armonia Ensemble (Brilliant Classics 94635)
- Il Giardino Armonico Opus III (world premiere recording), La Suave Melodia (Etcetera KTC 1356, May 2007)
