= Jos van Veldhoven =

Dutch choral conductor (born 1952)

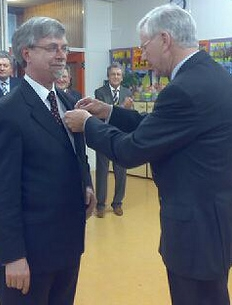
- Jos van Veldhoven (left) receiving a golden pin by the Bach Committee in 2008
- Born: 1952 (age 72–73); Den Bosch, The Netherlands
- Occupations: Conductor; Academic teacher
- Organizations: The Netherlands Bach Society; Amsterdam Conservatory; Royal Conservatory of The Hague
- Awards: Order of the Netherlands Lion
- Website: josvanveldhoven.nl

Josephus Maria Martinus van Veldhoven (born 1952 in Den Bosch) is a Dutch choral conductor. He studied musicology at the Rijksuniversiteit of Utrecht, and choral and orchestral conducting at the Royal Conservatory, the Hague. He was artistic director of the Netherlands Bach Society (Nederlandse Bachvereniging) from 1983 to 2018. In this capacity, he regularly gave performances at home and abroad of the major works of Johann Sebastian Bach and his predecessors and contemporaries. In addition, he has been the director since 1976 of the Utrechts Barok Consort, which he founded. He has made a great number of radio, television, and CD recordings with his ensembles, and he has appeared in festivals in the Netherlands, many countries in Western Europe, the United States, and Japan.

The New York Times stated that "Mr. van Veldhoven elicits readings in the best current style, lithe and lithing but also muscular, imaginative and spontaneous". He has been described by NRC Handelsblad as "the top ranking Netherlands choral director", and by Trouw as "one of the few Netherlands early music performers...[with] all-important pioneering zeal".

Jos van Veldhoven is a regular guest artist with international orchestras including Das Orchester der Beethovenhalle Bonn, The Tokyo Philharmonic Orchestra, the Telemann Chamber Orchestra, and the Essener Philharmoniker. Together with director Dietrich Hilsdorf, Jos van Veldhoven has been working since 2001 on a cycle of staged Handel oratorios at the Bonn Opera. Van Veldhoven also appears in his native country as a guest conductor, including appearances with Holland Symfonia and Opera Zuid.

In previous years, Jos van Veldhoven has attracted frequent attention with performances of "new" repertoire within the realm of early music. Noteworthy among them were performances of oratorios by Telemann and Graun, Vespers by Gastoldi, Netherlands repertoire of the Golden Age, reconstructions of Bach's St Mark Passion as well as the so-called Köthener Trauermusik and many unknown 17th century musical dialogues. He also conducted a great many contemporary premieres of baroque operas by composers including Mattheson, Keiser, Andrea and Giovanni Bononcini, Legrenzi, Conti, and Scarlatti. In 2008, he celebrated his 25th anniversary as artistic director of The Netherlands Bach Society, conducting Joseph Haydn's The Creation.

Jos van Veldhoven is professor of choral conducting at the Amsterdam Conservatory and the Royal Conservatory of The Hague.

In 2007, van Veldhoven was made a member of the Order of the Netherlands Lion.
