= Rotterdam School =

Group of composers

The term Rotterdam School is used to refer to a group of composers related to the city of Rotterdam.

What started in the final decade of the twentieth century within a small circle of composition students at the Rotterdam Conservatory with a manifesto by Rotterdam composer Oscar van Dillen, has been taken more seriously now in larger musical circles. Many Rotterdam composers have made successful careers in contemporary or theatre music.

It is impossible to accommodate all Rotterdam composers together in one kind of style or musical æsthetic. Therefore, one could not really speak of a school in the traditional meaning of the word.

The colloquium (called "practicums") at the Rotterdam Conservatoire, led by composition teachers Peter-Jan Wagemans and Klaas de Vries, played an important, unifying role.

== Composers ==
- Thorkell Atlason
- Erik de Clerq
- Nuno Corte-Real
- Oscar van Dillen
- Rocco Havelaar
- Bart de Kemp
- Hans Koolmees
- Astrid Kruisselbrink
- Andreas Kunstein
- Marcel Minderhoud
- Philemon Mukarno
- Florian Magnus Maier
- Christina Viola Oorebeek
- Joey Roukens
- Felipe Pérez Santiago
- Edward Top
- Marc Verhoeven
- Klaas de Vries
- Peter-Jan Wagemans
- Juan Felipe Waller
- Evrim Demirel
- Dimitris Andrikopoulos
