= Wiesemann =

Wiesemann is a German surname. Notable people with the surname include:

- Bernd Wiesemann (1938–2015), German pianist, composer, music educator and conceptual artist
- Claudia Wiesemann (born 1958), German medical ethicist and medical historian
- Karl-Heinz Wiesemann (born 1960), 96th Bishop of Speyer
- Mirjam Wiesemann (born 1964), German actress and author

== See also ==
- Wesemann, people named Wesemann
