= Klaas de Vries (composer) =

Dutch composer

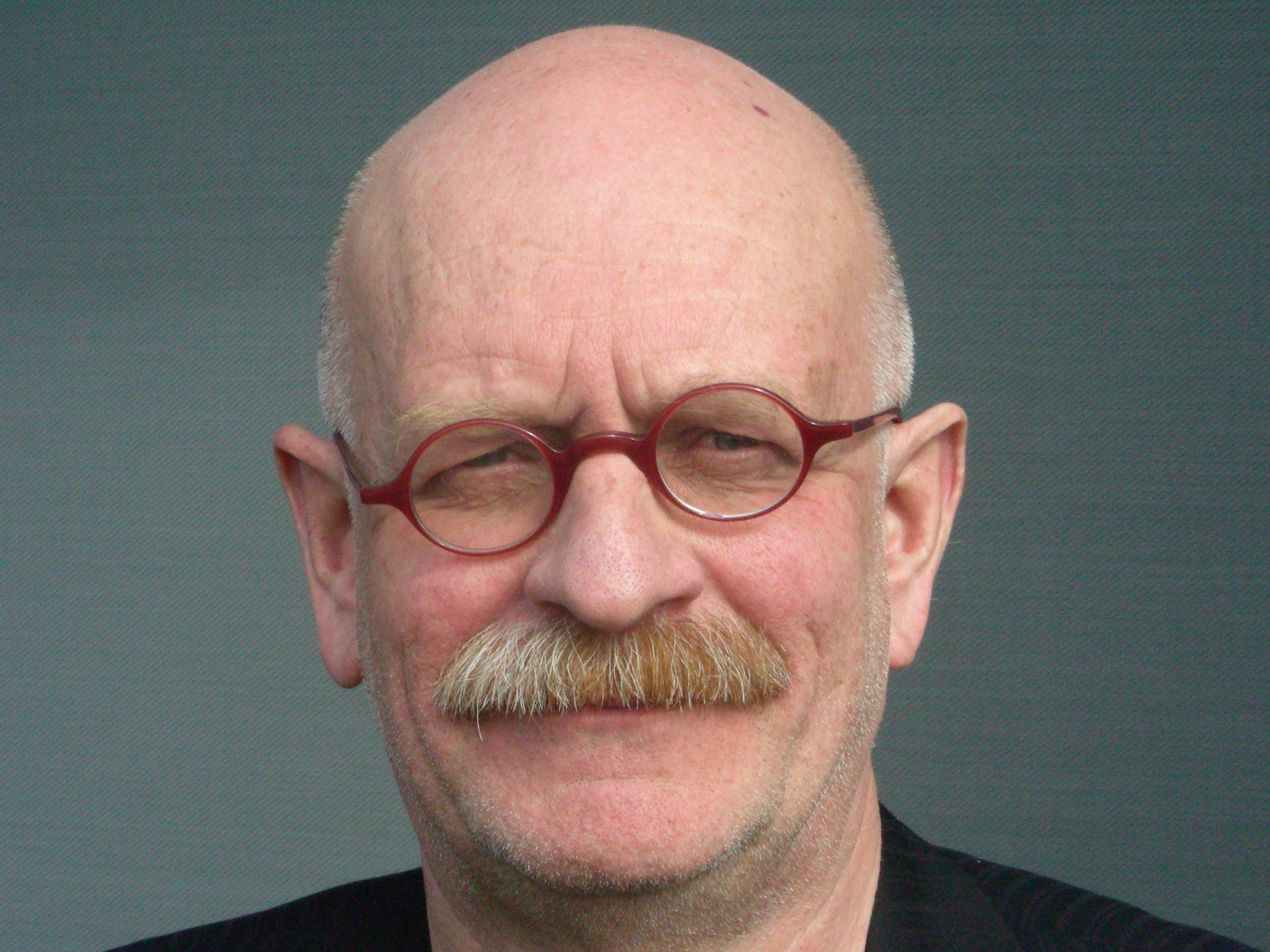
Klaas de Vries in 2006

Klaas de Vries (Dutch pronunciation: [ˈklaːz də ˈvris]; born 15 July 1944) is a Dutch composer. De Vries taught composition at the Rotterdam Conservatory until his retirement in 2009.

== Biography ==
Klaas de Vries was born on 15 July 1944 in Terneuzen, in the province of Zeeland in the Netherlands. From 1965 to 1972 he studied piano, theory and composition on the conservatory of Rotterdam. He continued studying composition from 1972 at the conservatory of The Hague with the Dutch composer Otto Ketting, winning the composition prize there in 1974. After winning this prize de Vries studied with the Croatian composer Milko Kelemen in Stuttgart, Germany. De Vries won the Matthijs Vermeulen Award twice: in 1984 for his work discantus (1982) and in 1998 for his opera A King, Riding and the Interludium for string orchestra (1996).

From 1972 to 1981 de Vries started to teach theory at the former conservatory of Twente, and he was appointed as a lecturer in theory, instrumentation, and composition at the conservatory of Rotterdam in 1979. Among his many students at this school, today also known as the Rotterdam School, are Thorkell Atlason, Antonio Pinho Vargas, António Chagas Rosa, Oscar van Dillen, Andreas Kunstein, Sergio Luque, César de Oliveira, Juan Felipe Waller, Philemon Mukarno, Astrid Kruisselbrink, Florian Magnus Maier, Felipe Perez Santiago, Joey Roukens, Edward Top, Jian-Hua Zhuang, Evrim Demirel, Gerda Geertens and Rob Zuidam.

In the 1970s de Vries got involved in the organization of the STAMP-concerts, in cooperation with Theo Loevendie. Since the 1980s de Vries got involved in the organization of the STAMP-concerts, in cooperation with Theo Loevendie. Since the 1980s de Vries has also been active, together with the composer Peter-Jan Wagemans, in the organization of the Unanswered Question foundation.

== Compositional style ==
=== Early influences ===
From his studies with Otto Ketting De Vries developed a fascination for Stravinsky, Bartók and Berg. Stravinsky is the largest influence for The Hague school of composers: The Hague school can be characterized by the usage of collage-like harmonic blocks, a way of composing associated with composers as Louis Andriessen. Although getting to compositional maturity in this surrounding, it did not take long for de Vries to realize the limitations of this style. Nevertheless, de Vries continued to use an anti-romantic approach to musical writing, shared with The Hague school (Oskamp 11-29).

Another technique learned from Otto Ketting is serialism, though this never really fascinated him (Schneeweisz 8). Apart from one work, namely Refrains (1968) for two piano's and orchestra, he never felt comfortable using serialistic techniques. He was to abandon this approach quickly (Oskamp 123).

De Vries' further influences came from the music of Varèse, Charles Ives and improvised music (Schneeweisz 8-9). From these composers he learned an open-mindedness towards musical composition, which made him able to follow his own musical path.

=== Mature style ===
De Vries' compositions can be described as a search for an own musical identity, the main goal being the creation of a style of writing in which he can be freed from given compositional necessities. The music of Berio influenced him to abandon The Hague school style and its static harmonic blocks. In his work bewegingen (English: movements) (1979) he experimented with the usage of fluent transitions and continuity (Oskamp 124).

De Vries puts more focus on his own notes to be convincing themselves, instead of the notes being the result of pre-compositional systems (Schneeweisz 10, 11). In this sense he is highly aware of the fact that it is not possible to entirely envision what effect the written notes will have on a listener. His approach towards composition can be described as speculative (Klis 388-389). To be able to give meaning to his written notes, De Vries turned for instance to the symbolism of Baroque techniques, such as the falling motive to illustrate the idea of death. De Vries also turned his attention towards the re-usage of music of the past (Wenekes 30), as exemplified by his Organum (1971), in which he re-introduced Perotinus' style in a modern setting.

In his works de Vries tries to create a balance between structure and expression. One thing evolves from the other. Not just individual elements or sequences, but whole works (Schneeweisz 11-12).

=== Literary influences ===
In his quest for finding new ways of expression in his music de Vries also turned to literature. In his chamber opera Eréndira (1984) he uses the novel of Gabriel García Márquez. Together with the usage of instruments as the mandolin and guitar, this music evokes an exotic atmosphere (Wennekes 28).

De Vries' sonata (1987) for piano solo marks a turning-point which led to an even more important role of extra-musical influences (Schneeweisz 12). The 'sonata' itself is based on the novel Dr. Faustus by Thomas Mann. De Vries is also greatly inspired by the novels of Latin-American authors, especially by the works the Argentine author Jorge Luis Borges. In his works Borges creates a large variety of mysterious repeats form a constantly recurring theme. We can see a similar trend in de Vries' compositional philosophy. As it is not possible to envision entirely the effect of written music on a listener, he or she will discover new facets in a work when subsequently listening to it. It is with this that de Vries tries to play by introducing repetition and variations on musical elements, bringing him close to the philosophy of the Argentine author (Klis 390).

Borges' idea to create alternative histories in his novels highly fascinates de Vries. In his trilogy De profundis, ...sub nocte per umbras..., Diafonía (1988–1991), de Vries reconstructs the past. The ...Sub nocte per umbras... (1989) deals with an alternative reconstruction of music from the antiquity. Diafonía (1988–1989) deals with a re-invention of folk music. The last work of the three, De profundis (1991) de Vries combines musical material from the first two works (Oskamp 122).

A further source of inspiration is the Portuguese author Fernando Pessoa, whose poems de Vries uses regularly. Pessoa's poem Abdicaçao de Vries is used by de Vries for his work Abdicaçao (1996) for a cappella choir. This and other poems return in his opera A King, Riding (1996) (Wenekes 28).

De Vries' also works closely together with authors. His opera Wake (2010) is based on the Enschede fireworks disaster in 2000, when a firework storage facility exploded and devastated an entire part of the city. The libretto is written by the English author David Mitchell in close cooperation with de Vries. The title of the opera is an allusion to Finnegans Wake by the Irish novelist James Joyce (NPSpodium, Wind).

== The opera A King, Riding ==
=== Multiple identities ===
The opera A King, Riding (1996) can be seen as one of de Vries' largest and most successful works until now. The opera is based on the book The Waves by the English author Virginia Woolf. The title refers to a passage form the book. De Vries also uses three poems by Pessoa. The Waves is made out of monologues by six different personages and deals with their individual, intellectual and emotional world. There is a seventh personage, called Percival who never speaks. He is only referred to by the six speaking personages who speak about him in a subjective way. Although Percival never speaks, he is the connecting figure among the six personages. His true identity remains a mystery. The poems of Pessoa form a moment of reflection on the Woolf story.

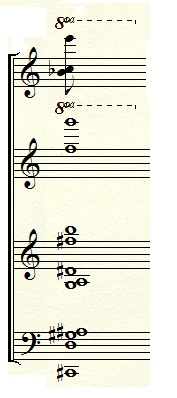
figure 1. The fundamental chord used in A King, Riding

The idea of multiple identities, to be found in the book, is the largest source of inspiration for de Vries. 'There is not one stable identity but many in which the reader moves from the one to the other' (Deurzen 215). The opera is based on the question about the essence of identity (Oskamp 125).

In A King, Riding the six personages are depicted by six singing voices accompanied by six instruments. Percival, the seventh character, also has a solo instrument, but no singing voice as he never speaks. This led to de Vries' concept of double personages; the symbiosis of the singing part and the solo instrument forms the personage as a whole (Deurzen 216). The solo instruments are accompanied by electronic sounds. These electronically created sounds have both the singing voices as the solo instruments as their source. A multi-layered idea of identity is then created. The first layer is formed by the singing voices. The second layer is formed by the solo-instrumental shadow, it has the same characteristics but is more vague and flexible than the voice. The third layer is formed by the electronics, the solo instruments are still recognizable, but get distorted (Deurzen 218).

=== Compositional techniques ===
The work has a fundamental chord which works as a building block in harmonic sense for the entire work. All other chords and harmonies are derived from this chord. The chord, depicted as figure 1, is made out of combinations of dominant seventh chords, combined with each other. The result is a harmonic language which sounds chromatic and dissonant, but still gives a feeling of movement (Zuidam 40).

In melodic sense A King, Riding works with a basic melodic curve, and gets altered throughout the piece. This process happens partially through the use of electronics. It is split up in smaller entities, mirrored and changes are added. In rhythmic sense we can find a lot of proportional values (Zuidam 40).

Another important aspect is the use of Baroque rhetoric. The solo instruments accentuate the emotional state of the singing voices using special intervals and special rhythmic patterns. Also the work as a whole is built as a modern passion: solo arias are being varied with instrumental and ensemble parts. These parts, among which the Pessoa poems, are built as baroque chorals and madrigals using polyphonic techniques. The poems are presented as "heterophonies" (Deurzen 217).

The work was premiered 21 May 1996, at the Royal Circus in Brussels. The work was performed by the joined forces of ASKO and Schönberg Ensemble, conducted by Reinbert de Leeuw.

== Works ==
- Three pieces for wind quintet (1968)
- Chain of changes for piano solo (1968)
- Refrains, for orchestra and 2 piano's (1970)
- Five-part fantasy, for flute ensemble or other instrumentation (1971)
- Organum, for 4 trombones and 3 piano's (amplified) (1971)
- Mars, for tenor saxophone and piano (1972)
- Follia, for brass, percussion, electronic instruments and five solo string instruments (1972-'73)
- Kwartet, for low string instruments (1973)
- Kadens, for wind orchestra (1973)
- Tegenzangen, for four-part mixed choir and orchestra with choir and percussion ensemble (1973)
- Twee koralen, for 4 saxophones (1974)
- Quasi una fantasia, for wind instruments, percussion, electronic organ and string quintet (1975)
- Moeilijkheden, for wind instruments and piano (1977)
- Impromptu, for flute and percussion (1978)
- Bewegingen, for 15 instruments (1979)
- Kotz, suite for 11 instruments(1979)
- Rondo, for horn and piano (1979)
- Drie harpisten, 3 pieces for 3 small harps (1979)
- Das Lebewohl? oder ... das Wiedersehn, two small pieces for string quartet (1979)
- Areas, for large choir and orchestra (1980)
- Tombeau, for string orchestra (1980)
- Discantus, for orchestra (1982)
- Eréndira, opera for 5 instrumental soloists, small choir and ensemble, libretto of Peter te Nuyl (1984)
- Instrumental music from Eréndira, for ensemble (1984, rev. 1992)
- 4 tango's, for voice and 4 accordions (1985)
- Murder in the dark, 5 microtonal works for harpsichord (1985)
- Phrases, for solo soprano, mixed choir, 6 instrumental soloists and orchestra (1986)
- Sonata for piano (1987)
- Diafonía - la Creación, for two sopranos and ensemble (1988-‘89)
- Diafonía - la Creación, for two sopranos and two pianos (1988-‘89)
- Songs and dances, for violin and piano (1989)
- ...sub nocte per umbras..., for large ensemble (1989)
- Berceuse, for bass-clarinet and percussion (1990)
- De profundis, for large wind orchestra (1991)
- Umbrae, for alto-recorder, bass-recorder and piano (1992)
- Eclips (Hommage à Alexandre Scriabine), for ensemble (1992)
- Strijkkwartet nr.1 String quartet (1993)
- Déploration sur la mort de Johan Ockeghem, for ensemble
- A King, Riding, scenic oratorium in 3 parts: (1995)
- Abdicaçao, for mixed a cappella choir (1996)
- Tegen de tijd, elegie for viola-solo (1998)
- Concert voor piano en orkest, concerto for piano and orchestra (1998)
- Concert voor piano en orkest, version for piano and 6 instrumentalists (1998, rev. 2003)
- Aleph, for mixed orchestra and choir (1999)
- Litanie, for mezzo-soprano and 8 cellos (1999)
- Antagonistische ode, for orchestra (2000, rev. 2005)
- Preludium - Interludium – Postludium, for 23 string players (1996-2000)
- Ghaf, for ensemble (2003)
- Versus, for brass ensemble (2004)
- Concert voor viool en orkest, concerto for violin and orchestra (2005)
- Stimmen-Engführung, for a cappella choir (2006)
- Pa pa pa Vrouw vrouw vrouw, music-theatre piece for baritone, mezzo-soprano, recorder, percussion and cimbalom (2007)
- Just Numbers, Dancing, for orchestra (2007)
- Wake, opera in 4 acts. Libretto by David Mitchell and electronics by René Uijlenhoet (2010)
- Providence, for symphonic orchestra (2011)
- Spiegelpaleis, for ensemble and electronics (by René Uijlenhoet) (2012)
- Tweede Pianoconcert, for piano and ensemble (2013)
- Honderd nachten, honderd jaren, music-theatre piece for female dancer, mezzo-soprano, male choir, small ensemble and organ (2013)
- All that we love is bound for the past, for piano trio and mezzo-soprano (2013)

== Bibliography ==
- Deurzen, Patrick van. On Random Water: "A King, Riding" by Klaas de Vries, Mens en melodie, li (1996), 214–18.
- Klis, Jolanda van der. Klaas de Vries, The Essential Guide to Dutch Music. Amsterdam: Amsterdam University Press, 2000, 388-391.
- Oskamp, Jacqueline ed. Radicaal gewoon. Amsterdam: Mets &Schilt, 2003.
- Schönberger, Elmer. Klaas de Vries, The New Grove online.
- Schneeweisz, Oswin. K. de Vries: Music must seduce the ear, Key Notes, xxvi (1992), 8-12.
- Wenekes, Emile and Mark Delaere ed. Klaas de Vries, Zeitgenössische Musik in den Niederlanden und Flandern. Brugge: Die Keure, 2006, 28-31.
- Wind, Thiemo. Opera "Wake" schept ruimte, De Telegraaf, 17.05.2010, 13.
- Zuidam, Rob. A King, Riding, Klaas de Vries: A King, Riding. Brussel: Bernard Foccroulle, 1996, 38-41.

== Discography ==
- A King Riding (Composers' Voice)
- Areas, Bewegingen, Follia, Discantus, Phrases (Composers' Voice)
- Diafonía, Sub nocte per umbras, De Profundis (Composers' Voice)
- Bart Berman, piano: Vriend, Hekster, Loevendie, De Vries, Kleinbussink (Golf)
- The contemporary harpsichord (NM Classics)
- Osiris trio and guests (NM Classics)
- Cappella Amsterdam (Q disc)
