= Andreas Kunstein =

German composer (born 1967)

Andreas Kunstein (born 25 June 1967) is a German composer who was born in Brühl (North Rhine-Westphalia). In his youth, he received piano lessons and wrote his first compositions. After finishing high school, he studied history and philosophy in Düsseldorf.

He also had private composition lessons with David Graham and Ratko Delorko. During 1992–1998 he studied composition at the Folkwang Hochschule in Essen, with Wolfgang Hufschmidt. At the Rotterdam Hogeschool voor Muziek en Dans, he completed his studies in composition with Peter-Jan Wagemans and Klaas de Vries in April 2002. He participated in masterclasses of Manfred Trojahn, Edison Denisov and George Crumb, amongst others.

His 13 Epigrams for Orchestra were nominated for the Dutch Young Composers Prize in 2000. In 1998, Andreas Kunstein received the scholarship of the Otmar Alt Foundation and in 2003 he received a scholarship of the Kulturfonds Foundation for the "Künstlerhaus Lukas".

Andreas Kunstein is counted as one of the Rotterdam School composers.

== Works ==
Works by Kunstein have been published by Donemus, including:

- Toccata for piano (1980/1991)
- Fantasy in G-minor for piano (1991)
- String quartet No. 1 (1992)
- 10 Epigrams for toy piano (1992) (Version for piano: 1996)
- Woodwinds Quintet (1993)
- String quartet No. 2 (1994)
- Mutter denkt nach for mezzo-soprano and piano (text: Hedda Zinner, 1929) (1995)
- 2 Portraits for piano (1995–1997)
- 13 Epigrams for orchestra (1998) (New version: 2000)
- String Trio (1992/1999)
- Szenen aus einem Studentenleben for orchestra (2001–2002) (Version for piano: 2001)
- String quintet (2002)
- Suite for orchestra (2002) (Version for 2 pianos: Suite for 2 pianos)
- Music for 2 Pianos and Percussion (2003)
- Turbulences for big band (2003)

His 10 Epigrams for toy piano appeared in 1994 on CD SST 31112 played by Bernd Wiesemann and his 10 Epigrams for piano appeared on NCC 8007 played by Ratko Delorko.
