= Oscar van Dillen =

Dutch composer, conductor, and instrumentalist (born 1958)

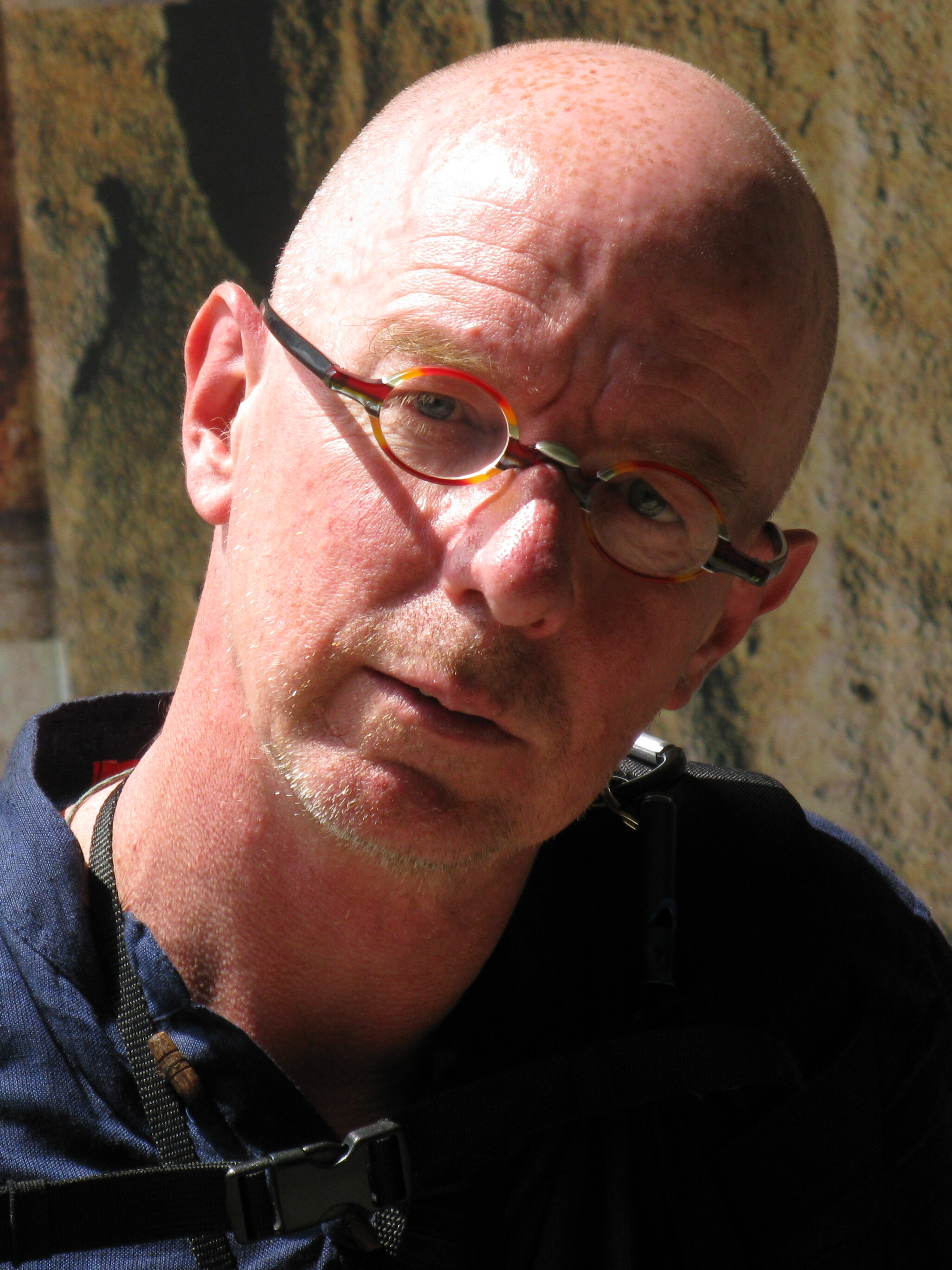
- Van Dillen in August 2009
- Born: Oscar Ignatius Joannes van Dillen; 25 June 1958 (age 68) 's-Hertogenbosch, Netherlands
- Era: 20th century, Contemporary

Oscar Ignatius Joannes van Dillen (born 25 June 1958 in 's-Hertogenbosch) is a Dutch composer, conductor, and instrumentalist.

== Education ==
Van Dillen studied North-Indian classical music (sitar, tabla, vocal) with Jamaluddin Bhartiya at the Tritantri School in Amsterdam and bansuri with Gurbachan Singh Sachdev at the Bansuri School of Music in Berkeley, California from 1977 to 1980, as well as classical and jazz flute at the Sweelinck Conservatory in Amsterdam between 1982 and 1984. Here, he also received composition lessons from Misha Mengelberg.

After studies of medieval and Renaissance music with Paul Van Nevel in Leuven (Belgium), he studied classical composition with, among others, Dick Raaymakers and Gilius van Bergeijk at the Koninklijk Conservatory in The Hague in 1990/1991 and with Klaas de Vries, Peter-Jan Wagemans and René Uijlenhoet at the Rotterdam Conservatory from 1996 to 2002. He also studied composition with Manfred Trojahn at the Robert Schumann College in Düsseldorf in 2001, where he also received lessons in conducting from Lutz Herbig.

== Employment and affiliation ==
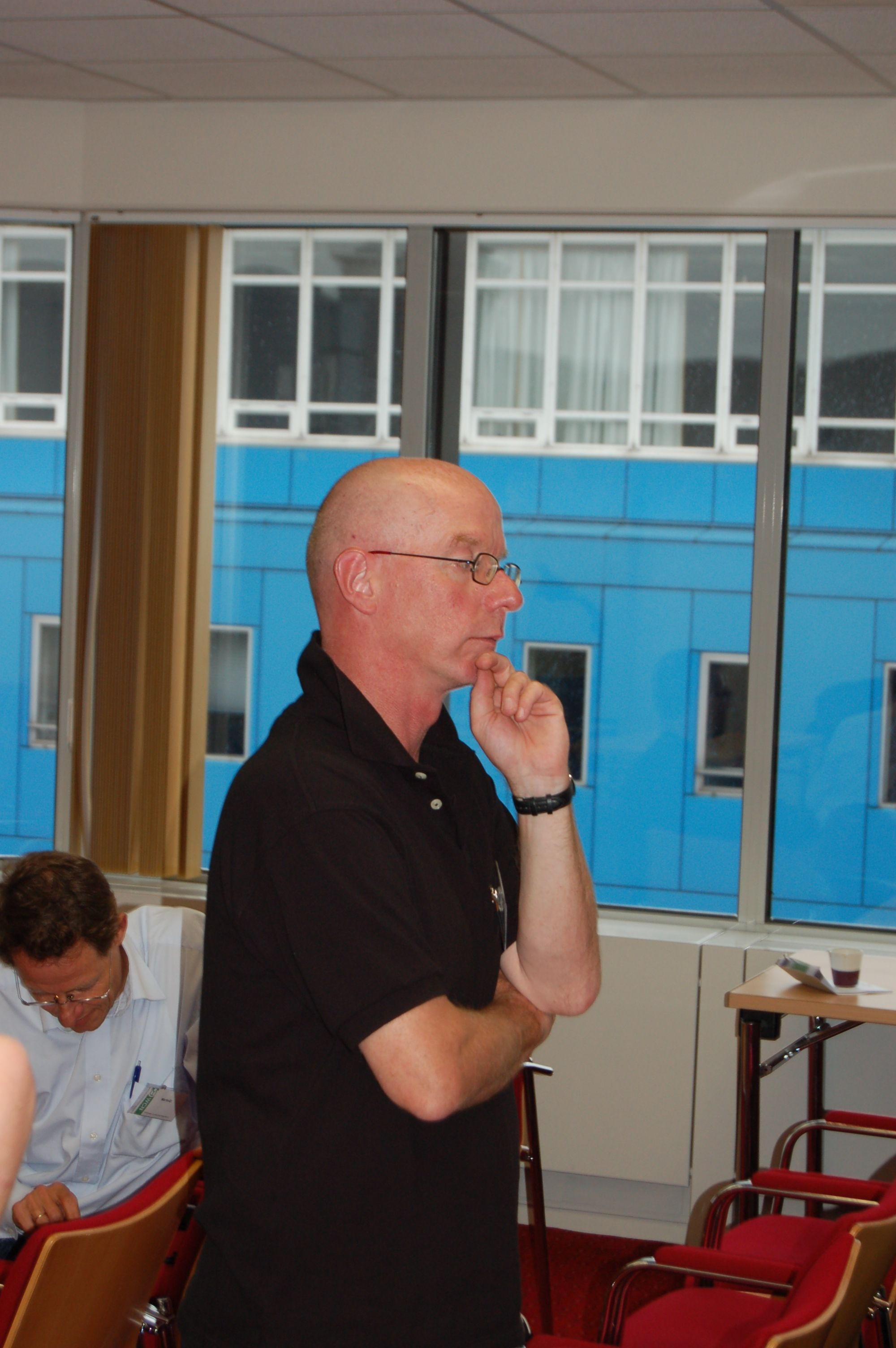
van Dillen at a Dutch Wikipedia meeting (2006)

Van Dillen teaches world music composition as well as music theory in the jazz, pop, and world music department at the Conservatory of Rotterdam, in the city where he lives.

He is a member of Componisten 96, a closely restricted association for the promotion of composing in the Netherlands.

He was the first chairperson of the Dutch chapter of the Wikimedia Foundation and among its founders. From December 2006 to July 2007 he was a member of the Board of Trustees of the Wikimedia Foundation. He is also the vice president of The Netherlands–Turkey Friendship Foundation.

He is a founding member of the Rotterdam School of composers.

== Works and projects ==
On 22 February 2008 his work Paradox – Music for a Sculpture was performed at the Boymans Van Beuningen Museum in Rotterdam.

On 21 November 2008 his *2 Cameras @ Sea (2008) premiered at Muziekgebouw aan 't IJ, Amsterdam during SHIFT, the Canadian and Dutch Arts Festival. Van Dillen composed the music for the Canadian ensemble "Continuum Contemporary Music".

In April 2009 Continuum Contemporary Music of Toronto premiered 2 Cameras @ Sea, a collaboration between Oscar van Dillen and Canadian filmmaker Clive Holden, commissioned by the Canada Council for the Arts. The performance took place at the Images Festival in Toronto, and was repeated in Amsterdam.

Also in 2009, Original Winds from Breda performed his ballet music in an extended series of music and dance performances in Rotterdam.

Van Dillen wrote Objet Privé, for solo cello, and Forecast, for violin, cello and bayan for cellist John Addison who also has one of the string quartets on his repertoire list.

Doelenkwartet premiered both of his string quartets and continue to play them regularly.

== Compositions ==
- Saxophone Quartet No. 1 (1996)
- Conga for one percussionist (1996)
- Toccata Sanguinica for Baroque guitar (1996)
- Zwaar is Mooi for ensemble (1997)
- Ignatia for clarinet solo (1998)
- Tarentula for recorder duo (1998)
- Tijd Speelt Geen Rol for ensemble (1998)
- Summa Scientia for female choir (1999)
- String Quartet No. 1 (1999)
- Objet Privé (das Ding an mich) for violoncello solo (1999)
- Le Panache for piano (2000)
- Méditation for piano (2000)
- Labyrinth for three moving trombone players (2001)
- de Beweging for large orchestra (2001)
- Memos for a New Millennium for Disklavier with Player (2002)
- Roter Damm Verwandelt for solo rapper, ensemble and soundscape (2002)
- de Stad for ensemble (2003)
- mm³ for Toy piano (2004)
- Forecast for violin, violoncello and bayan (2004)
- String Quartet 2 (2007)
- Paradox, Music for a sculpture (2008)
- 2 Cameras @ Sea (2008), a project with Canadian filmmaker Clive Holden and part of the Utopia Suite.

== Recordings ==
- Van Dillen's first CD, de Stad (the City), performed by the Ensemble Gelber Klang, was released on Super Audio CD by Cybele Records (2003) SACD 361.301.
- His work for three toy pianos mm^{3} is included on Bernd Wiesemann's CD Das Untemperierte Klavier: Neue Kompositionen für Kinderklavier, Cybele SACD 160.501.
- The DoelenKwartet has recorded Van Dillen's String Quartet No. 1, Etcetera Records KTC 1339.
- 10 Jahre Cybele Records - Klassik Der Zukunft (2004).

== See also ==
- List of Wikipedia people
