= Bernd Wiesemann =

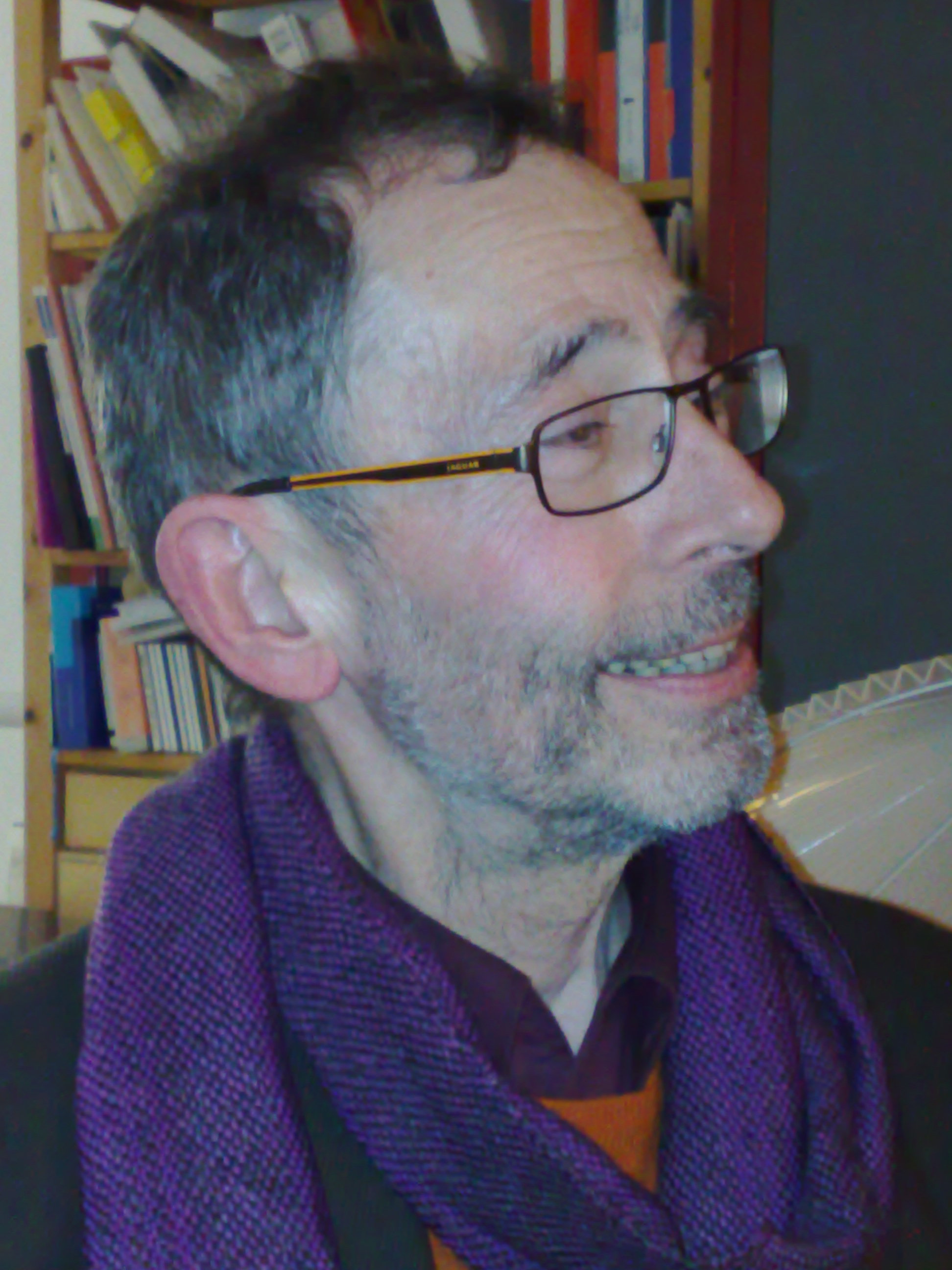
- Wiesemann in 2008
- Born: 4 August 1938; Düsseldorf
- Died: 10 August 2015 (aged 77); Düsseldorf
- Education: Robert Schumann-Institut
- Occupations: Pianist; Composer; Music educator; Conceptual artist
- Website: www.bernd-wiesemann.de

Bernd Wiesemann (4 August 1938 – 10 August 2015) was a German pianist, composer, music educator and conceptual artist.

== Career ==
Born in Düsseldorf, Wiesemann studied piano with Alexander Kaul at the Robert Schumann-Institut in his hometown.

Wiesemann was a pioneer of the kinderklavier (children's piano, also toy piano), which he promoted from the end of the 1970s as a concert instrument on which he performed and for which he composed, for example Sieben Miniaturen (1980), Petite Suite (1987) and Bauhaus-Suite (1994). He played many concerts, even in open places such as stations, in Kneipen and on the street. He organized with René Heinersdorff a concert series, from 1991 to 2000, forum 20 – musik unseres jahrhunderts im spiegel der dezennien (forum 20 – music of our century mirrored in decades), which focused on a fusion of the arts, both informative and entertaining. He played concerts in Germany, France, Ireland and the Netherlands, recorded CDs and made radio productions and documentations. He recorded in 2003 a SACD Neue Musik für Kinderklavier – Das untemperierte Klavier. Colleagues composing for him and his kinderklavier included Christian Banasik, Oskar Gottlieb Blarr, Ratko Delorko, Michael Denhoff, Oscar van Dillen and Andreas Kunstein. Wiesemann's compositions for children's piano were published by Verlag Dohr in Cologne. He died in his hometown. His daughter is the actress Mirjam Wiesemann. A memorial concert for him was played on 22 November 2015 at the Tonhalle Düsseldorf in the series for contemporary music Na hör’n Sie mal.

== Selected compositions ==
- Sieben Miniaturen (1980) for toy piano (children's piano) or other keyboard instrument. Verlag Dohr, ISMN M-2020-0543-9
- Petite Suite (1987) for toy piano (children's piano) or other keyboard instrument. Verlag Dohr, ISMN M-2020-0542-9
- Bauhaus-Suite (1994) for toy piano (children's piano) or other keyboard instrument. Verlag Dohr, ISMN M-2020-0541-5
- Choreographie der Klänge, for piano, trombone, and experimental sounds

== Discography ==
- Choreographie der Klänge. Paul Hubweber, trombone, Johannes Leis, baritone-saxophone, Bernd Wiesemann, piano, live recording of 27 November 2001, Tonhalle Düsseldorf, Verlag Dohr DCD012, 2002
- Das untemperierte Klavier - Neue Musik für Kinderklavier, Cybele Records, 2003
