= Leopold Prize =

The Leopold Prize may refer to one of the following awards:

- Grand Prix Charles-Leopold Mayer (Charles-Léopold Mayer Prize), awarded annually by the Académie des Sciences (French Academy of Sciences) de l'Institut de France (the French Institute)
- Leopold (prize), a biennial German media prize for music for children
- Leopold Griffuel Prize (Prix Leopold Griffuel), sponsored by the French ARC Foundation for Cancer Research
- Richard W. Leopold Prize, awarded biennially by the Organization of American Historians (OAH)
