= Astrid Kruisselbrink =

Dutch composer (born 1972)

- Born: February 9, 1972; Velsen, Netherlands
- Occupation: Composer

Astrid Kruisselbrink (born 9 February 1972) is a Dutch composer. While studying at the Rotterdam Conservatory (1993–99) she won first prize at the European Young Women Composers Contest with the choral work Zijn lippen zijn uw lippen (His Lips are Your Lips). In 1998, her Spin for soprano and ensemble was selected for the international Gaudeamus Music Week for young musicians. Just before graduation, her composition In for orchestra was selected for the Project Jonge Componisten (Project Young Composers) and performed by the Balletorchestra, conducted by Richard Dufallo. She has since composed for various ensembles and choirs. During and after her studies she studied briefly with Luciano Berio, Betsy Jolas, Louis Andriessen and György Kurtag.

== Biography ==
Born in the Dutch town of Velsen, from the age of nine she received piano lessons, both classical and jazz. In 1993, she entered the Rotterdam Conservatory (Codarts) where she studied composition under Klaas de Vries, Peter-Jan Wagemans ánd René Uijlenhoet, graduating cum laude in 1999.

Notable works include String quartet (2000) recorded and performed by the Doelenkwartet. Pra (2003) for orchestra and soprano was performed by Monique Krüs and Het Gelders Orkest conducted by Hans Leenders. Strijklicht (2007) for stringorchestra, was performed by the Het Rotterdams Kamerorkest conducted by Conrad van Alphen. Her piano composition Apen en Beer (Ape and Bear) with a piece for each letter in the alphabet was published in 2009. The work was premiered in Rotterdam in December 2009 when 30 young pianists performed the items on different animals. In 2011, her chamberopera The Reclining Woman, based on sculptures by Henry Moore, was performed by Muziektheater de Helling in cooperation with the ensemble Nieuw Amsterdams Peil. October 2015, the Asko/Schönberg ensemble, conducted by Reinbert de Leeuw, performed Die Klage um Linos, for ensemble and countertenor. In 2017, together with mezzo-soprano Antje Lohse, Stichting Knars and the Kröller-Müller Museum, she created the theatrical concert Menschen-Worte with poems of poet and visual artist Hans Arp.

Over the years, in addition to work commissioned by orchestra, choir, ensembles and individual musicians, she has composed for the theatre and for children. Her children's opera Fietsen (Cycling), based on a book by Gregie de Maeyer, was performed at Antwerp's Het Paleis in 1999. In 2009, young actors/singers of the Bürgerhaus Weserterrassen in Bremen, together with the Lithuanian Youthorchestra, performed Schwarz wie Tinte, based on the book Zwart als inkt (1998) by the Dutch writer and visual artist Wim Hofman.

Astrid Kruisselbrink lives in Gouda with her husband and two sons.

== Externe link ==
- Official website
