= Víctor Varela =

Venezuelan-Swedish composer (b.1955)

Víctor Varela (born 1955) is a Venezuelan-Swedish composer based in Gothenburg. His compositions include works for orchestra, vocal and instrumental chamber music, with electronics and computer devices.

== Education ==
Varela was born in Caracas where he studied musical composition, electronic music and piano at the National Conservatory of Music Juan José Landaeta, obtaining a degree in composition in 1987. Afterwards, he studied composition at the Conservatorium van Amsterdam (Composition Prize in 1993) and electronic music at the Royal Conservatory of The Hague. Among his teachers are Antonio Mastrogiovanni, Eduardo Kusnir, Geert van Keulen, Ton de Leeuw, Louis Andriessen, Theo Loevendie, John Coolidge Adams and Trevor Wishart.

== Career ==
Varela's music has been performed at festivals and events in major cities worldwide, including festivals like ISCM World Music Days, San Juan’s Biennial of Contemporary Music, Caracas Latin American Music Festival, Inter American Music and Dance Festival, Green Umbrella Series, Stockholm New Music, and Gothenburg Art Sounds.

In Venezuela he received the National Composition Award and the Caracas City Municipal Award. In 1996 his Second String Quartet was selected to represent Venezuela at the ISCM Festival in Copenhagen, and in 2005 his Axle-asimétrica II was selected to represent Sweden at the ISCM Festival in Zagreb. He has written works commissioned by the Teresa Carreño Opera Theatre, the Venezuelan Society for Electronic Music, the Swedish Arts Grants Committee, the Swedish Arts Council, Caracas Ensemble, Nova Musica Ensemble, STIM, the Stockholm Saxophone Quartet, Gageego!, Ars Nova, and Concerts Sweden.

Varela taught at the National Conservatory of Music J.J. Landaeta and at IUDEM, both in Caracas. He has also been a lecturer at the Universities Central de Venezuela, Simón Bolívar, Stanford, and Gothenburg.

Varela became a Swedish citizen in 2001.

== Selected works ==
Orchestral

- El Cántico de Khronos for full orchestra (1987)
- Two articulations for chamber orchestra (1992)
- Gemini Delta for full orchestra (2012)

Concertante

- Axle-Asimétrica I for cello soloist and chamber orchestra (1997–98)
- Syntax for flute, oboe soloists and chamber orchestra (2005)

Instrumental solo

- Archipiélago for organ (2002)
- Batacumbele for bass clarinet (2000)
- Crystals for clarinet (2000)
- Luna en refracción for flute (2001)
- Otoño-Occidente for piano (1994–95)
- Jeux de dispersion for piano (2007)
- Sabines Spiralis for piccolo (1995–96)
- Viola pomposa for viola (2006)
- Exit/entrée for double bass (2019)

Chamber music

- Axle-Asimétrica II for harp, vibraphone and marimba (1997)
- Claro/ Obscuro for bass clarinet and harpsichord (1996)
- Equinox for saxophone quartet (2002–03)
- In between silences for trombone and percussion player (2003–04)
- Miró-epsilon for alto recorder and marimba (1996–97)
- Second String Quartet (1994)
- Canciones de solitud y utopía for flute soloist and ensemble (2004)
- à trois for violin, French horn and piano (2005)
- Online for bass clarinet and organ (2005)

Vocal

- Parola lontana for female voice and ensemble (1998–99)
- La fraîcheur de la dernière vêprée for mezzo-soprano and percussion player (2001)
- Calligrammes for soprano and ensemble (2001)
- Canto III for mixed choir a cappella (2006)

Ballet

- Linear Dances for two pianos, two percussions & 4 dancers (2014)

Electronics

- Praeludium I for oboe, live electronics and tape (1988)
- Omaggio a Cortázar for mezzo-soprano & computer (1991–92)
- Logarítmica for percussion player and magnetic tape (1994)
