= Theo Loevendie =

Dutch composer and clarinet player (born 1930)

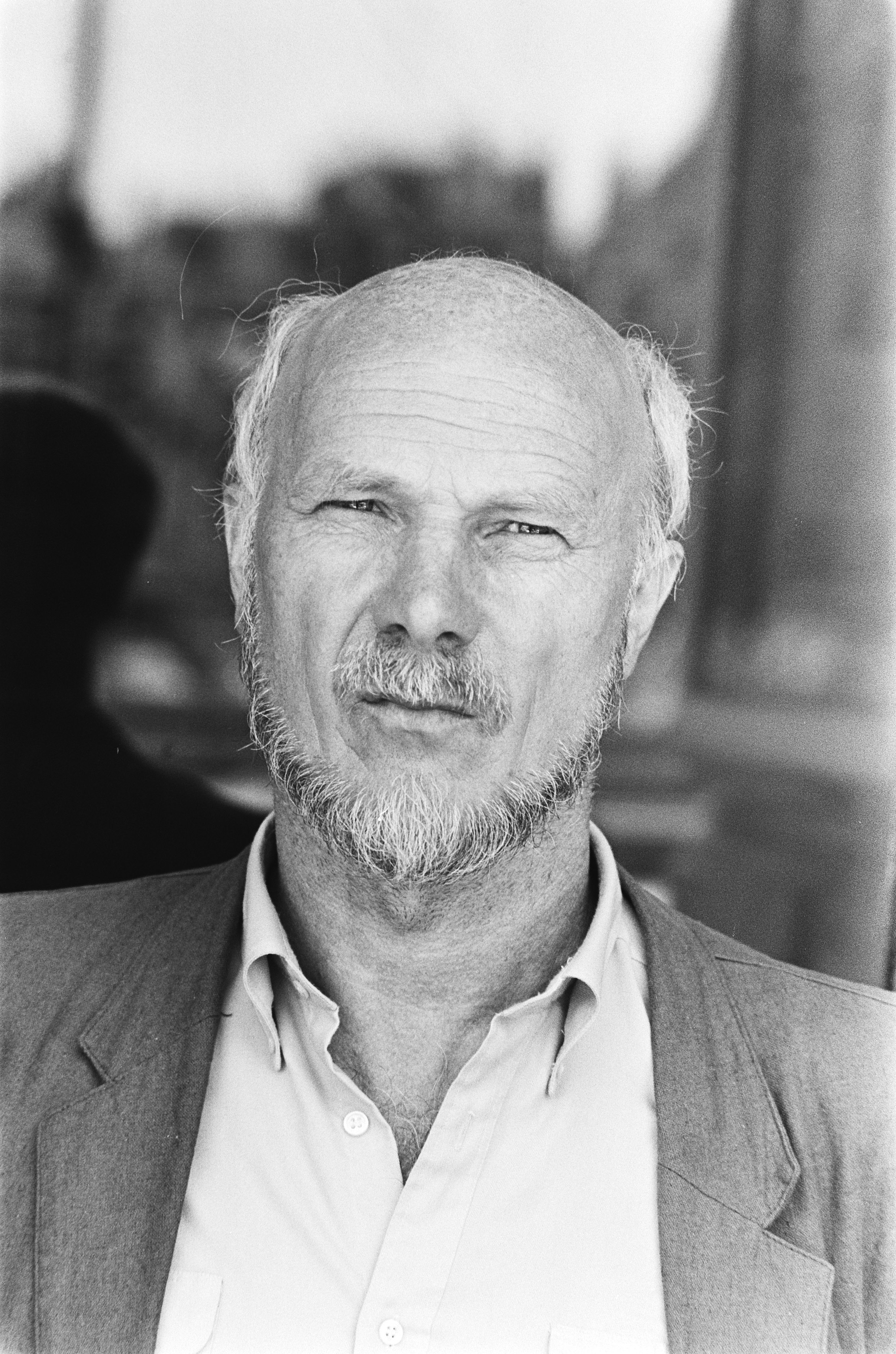
Loevendie in 1985

Johan Theodorus Loevendie (born 17 September 1930) is a Dutch composer and clarinet player.

Loevendie was born in Amsterdam, and studied composition and clarinet at the music academy (Conservatorium) of Amsterdam. Initially he concentrated on jazz music. As off 1968 he also wrote concert music, among which operas, concertos and chamber music. Several of his compositions won prizes.

Starting 1970 Loevendie taught composition at several Dutch conservatoires. Among his many students were Svitlana Azarova, Matthias Kadar, Vanessa Lann, Peter van Onna, Robin de Raaff, Victor Varela, Sinta Wullur and Evrim Demirel.

As a performer, he participated in the ensembles Consort, Brevisand the Theo Loevendie Quintet.

In 2004, he founded a new group: The "Ziggurat Ensemble". It consists of a mix of western and non-western instruments: Er-hu, Viola da Gamba, Qanun, Voice, Duduk, Bass, Pan Pipes and Percussion.

== Works ==
=== Orchestra and large ensemble ===
- 2014 Rise of Spinoza; for chorus and orchestra
- 2008 Jubilation Jump; for Tap Dancer and orchestra.
- 2002 Seyir; for 25 European and non-European instruments.
- 2000 Koraalvariaties “Von der Höhe in der Tiefe”; for 19 instruments.
- 1998 Esmée-suite: “Ondergang”; for orchestra.
- 1997 Vueltas; for strings and percussion.
- 1996 Piano Concerto
- 1986 Naima Suite; for orchestra.
- 1986 Intermezzo; for orchestra, from the opera “Naima” (1985).
- 1983 In Prison; for orchestra, fragment from the opera “Naima” (1985).
- 1983 Music for a Strange Wedding; for orchestra, choreographic scene from the opera “Naima” (1985)
- 1979 Flexio; for orchestra.
- 1971 Bacchanten; stage music for a theatrical piece by Euripides.
- 1966 Confluxus; for jazz-orchestra and symphony-orchestra.

=== Chamber music ===
- 2003 Victoria Regina; for flute, clarinet, violin and violoncello.
- 2001 Per quanti? III; for alto flute, harp and percussion.
- 1999 Sonata Coloniae for viola solo (1999)
- 1998 Two Mediterranean Dances; for 8 violoncellos.
- 1998 Golliwog's other dances; for clarinet, trumpet and bassoon.
- 1997 Ackermusik; for piano trio.
- 1997 Sandsandsnaresandsizzles; for 3 percussionists.
- 1996 ¿Que pasa en la calle?; for 4 trumpets.
- 1996 Fanfare; for 9 brass instruments and percussion.
- 1995 Laps; for ensemble.
- 1994 Two pieces on canons by Guillaume de Machaut; for saxophone quartet.
- 1994 Amsterdam Tango; for violin, bandoneon, viola, violoncello, double bass and piano.
- 1993; arr. 1994 Two pieces on canons by Guillaume de Machaut; for mandoline, guitar, harp and bass clarinet resp.clarinet.
- 1993 Two pieces on canons by Guillaume de Machaut; for flute quartet.
- 1992 Cycles; for clarinet, violin, violoncello and piano.
- 1992 Lerchen-Trio; for clarinet, violoncello and piano, in memoriam Olivier Messiaen
- 1991 Drones, for violin and piano.(Drones, Cycles and the Lerchen-Trio form in this order a trilogy)
- 1990 Passacaglia alla Turca; (1990) for 8 instruments.
- 1988 Plus One; for flute, bass clarinet and piano [1981-1988].
- 1986 Back Bay Bicinium; for 7 instruments.
- 1986 Dance; for violin solo
- 1981 Venus and Adonis suite; for 5 instruments.
- 1980 Nonet; for winds, percussion, piano and double bass.
- 1980 Venus and Adonis; for ensemble, music for a theatre production after a poem by *William Shakespeare.
- 1979 Voor Jan, Piet en Klaas; for 2 pianos 8-hands.
- 1974 Prelude; for 6 percussionists.
- 1974 Timbo; for percussion group (6 players).
- 1974 The Nightingale; for ensemble, music for a theatre version of the tale by Hans Christian Andersen.
- 1971 Music for bass clarinet and piano.
- 1968 Tre Pezzi; for piccolo clarinet (in Eb), clarinet (in b) and bass clarinet (in b)
- 1964 Three Pieces for youth ensemble

== Discography ==
- 1978 Bart Berman, piano: Vriend, Hekster, Loevendie, De Vries, Kleinbussink (Golf)
- 1986 Theo Loevendie Quintet (Varajazz)
- 1998 Esmeé, Opera in two acts conducted by Geoffrey Moull, with Margaret Thompson, William Oberholtzer, Bielefeld Philharmonic Orchestra, Bielefeld Opera Chorus, Donemus CV74/75
- 2005 Cello Octet Conjunto Iberico: Four Winds (Etcetera)
- 2005 Bayram: Theo Loevendie meets Kristina Fuchs Sonic Unit (TryTone)
- 2022 DUO for bass clarinet solo, recorded by Fie Schouten (Trytone)

== Awards ==
- 1969 - Edison for a jazz album
- 1979 - The Wessel Ilcken Award
- 1982 - Edison for De nachtegaal (1979)
- 1984 - Koussevitzky International Record Award (together with Pierre Boulez)
- 1986 - Matthijs Vermeulen Award for Naima
- 1988 - 3M Award
