= Edward Top =

Dutch composer (born 1972)

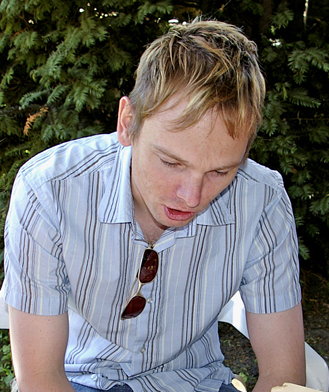
Edward Top

Siemon Edward Top (born 1 January 1972 in Ommen) is a Dutch composer.

Top studied violin and composition with Peter-Jan Wagemans at the Rotterdam Conservatoire. He won the Dutch prize for composition in 1999. He also studied composition with Klaas de Vries. After his graduation he studied music theory and analysis at King's College London.

During the Dutch Music Days of 2004 he won the Henriëtte Bosmans Prize for his orchestra work Marble Sparks. He also won the 2003 Salvatore Martirano Memorial Composition Award at the University of Illinois for his String Quartet Nr. 1.

Most of his music has been published by Donemus in Amsterdam.

== Selected works ==
- Stillpoint (1995)
- Overwhelming Blankness of the Ultimate Meaninglessness of Tragedy (1996)
- String Quartet Nr. 1 (1998)
- Silk Execution (1999)
- Symphony Gouden Draak (2000)
- Sonate for violin and piano (2001)
- Piano Trio "en weende hij bitter" (Dutch: And He Wept Bitterly) (2001)
- String Quartet Nr. 2 "Das Lied der Schwermuth" (2002)
- Most Beautiful Bird of Paradise (2003)
- Marble Sparks (2004)
- 34 - Concerto for electric guitar and wind orchestra (2006)
- Jimmy (2007)
- Concerto for violin and two orchestras (2007)

== Honors and awards ==
- 1999 - Composition Prize, Rotterdam Conservatoire
- 2003 - Martirano Award, University of Illinois, Urbana-Champaign
- 2004 - Bosmans Prize, Netherlands Music Days, Utrecht
- 2006 - Atahualpa Award, National University of Lanús, Buenos Aires
- 2007 - New Millennium Award, Birmingham Conservatoire
- 2008 - Toonzetters
