= Mirjam Wiesemann =

German actress

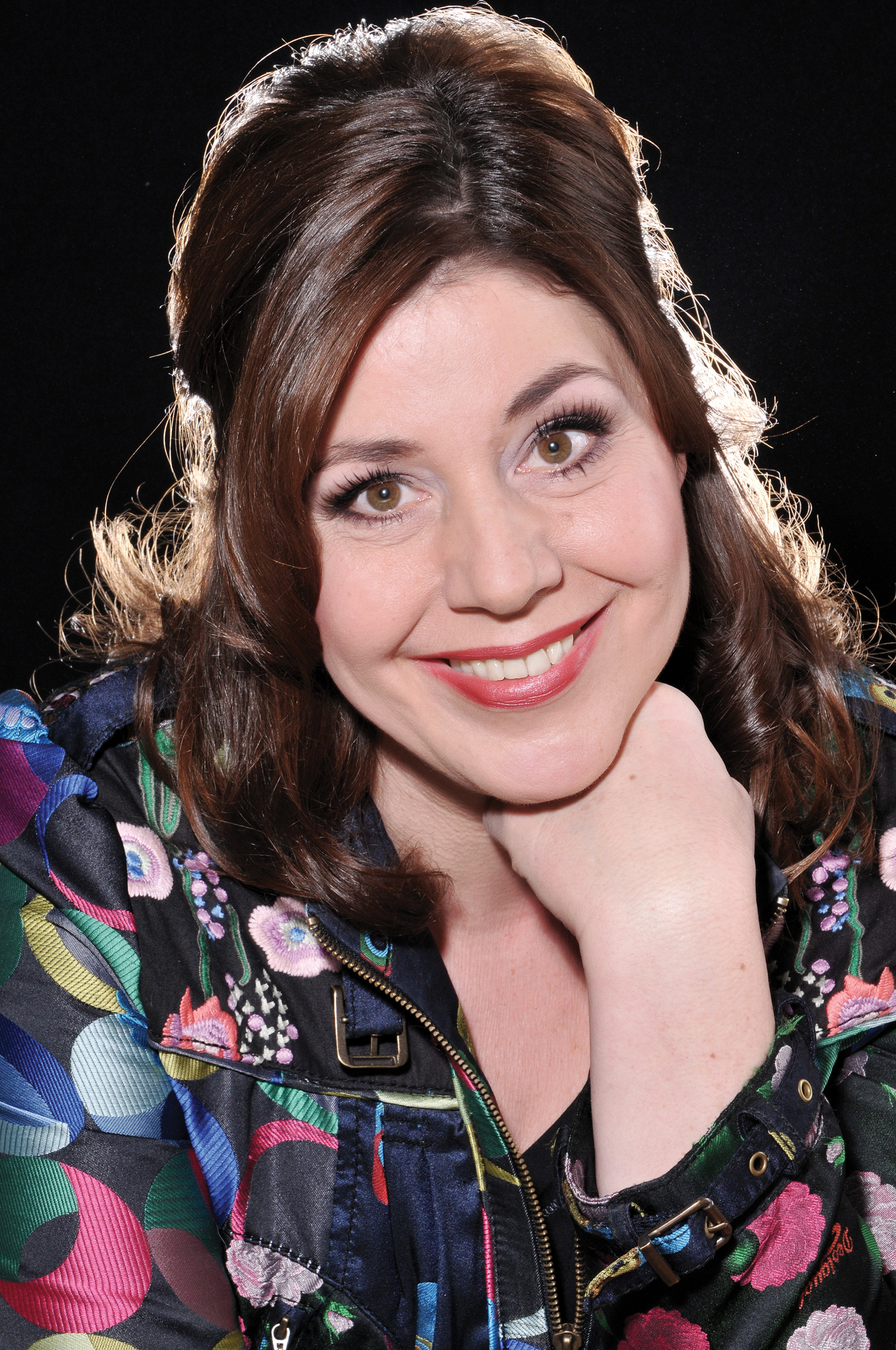
- Wiesemann in 2012
- Born: 1964 (age 61–62); Düsseldorf
- Occupations: Actress; Author
- Organizations: Cybele Records
- Awards: ECHO Klassik; Deutscher Hörbuchpreis; Leopold
- Website: www.mirjam-wiesemann.de

Mirjam Wiesemann (born 1964) is a German actress and author. She is a co-founder of Cybele Records, and the artistic director and speaker of its audiobooks, with a focus on contemporary music.

== Early life and education ==
Wiesemann was born in Düsseldorf the daughter of the pianist and composer Bernd Wiesemann. She studied acting in her hometown.

== Career ==
Wiesemann has appeared on stage in Krefeld, Bochum, Köln, Düsseldorf and Bonn. She has performed in films and television plays, including the series Auf Achse, T.V. Kaiser and Lindenstraße. She played the part of Edelfräulein in Helge Schneider's film Texas – Doc Snyder hält die Welt in Atem.

In 2004 she was a co-founder of Cybele Records, together with her husband Ingo Schmidt-Lucas. She has been the artistic director and speaker of its audiobooks, a series "Wort und Musik" related to music. Titled "Künstler im Gespräch" (Artists in conversation), she introduces the music of contemporary composers in selected examples from their compositions and conversation, for example talking to the son of Karl Amadeus Hartmann, with additional historic sound documents by the composer and his wife. She focused on string quartets by Hans Erich Apostel and Requiem music by Hans Werner Henze in 2010, on piano music by Pierre Boulez, including the first complete recording of his compositions for piano, in 2013, concertos by Jacqueline Fontyn in 2014, and music for ensemble by Juan Allende-Blin in 2016. In 2014 she published an art book with a sound CD, Weht ein Stadtspaziergang durch den Traum, for the 20th anniversary of Cybele Records.

== Awards ==
In 2009, Wiesemann was awarded both the ECHO Klassik and the Leopold media prize for the audiobook "Die Prinzessin – Kindergeschichten, geschrieben und gesprochen von Arnold Schönberg" (The Princess – children's stories written and spoken by Arnold Schoenberg). She received the ECHO Klassik in 2010 for the audiobook about Hartmann. Her edition of audiobooks about composers received in 2011 the prize for "Beste verlegerische Leistung" (best editorial achievement) of the Deutscher Hörbuchpreis.

== Discography ==
- Katrin Dorn: Tangogeschichten (2004)
- Urs Faes: Als hätte die Stille Türen (2005)
- Martin Baltscheit: Vom Mädchen das nicht schlafen wollte (2006)
- Arnold Schoenberg: Die Prinzessin – Kindergeschichten, geschrieben und gesprochen von Arnold Schönberg (2008)
- Karl Amadeus Hartmann und das Streichquartett – Mit historischen und neuen Sprachaufnahmen der Familie Hartmann. 3 SACDs with historic sound recordings by Karl Amadeus Hartmann, Ulrich Dibelius in conversation with Hartmann's wife Elisabeth, Mirjam Wiesemann in conversation with Hartmann's son Richard; Cybele Records, Edition "Künstler im Gespräch", 2009 ISBN 978-3-937794-06-8.
- Hans Erich Apostel und das Streichquartett (2010)
- Hans Werner Henze und das Requiem (2010)
- Mirjam Wiesemann: Auf Flügeln in die Tiefe – Geschichten vom Aufwachsen (2010)
- Pierre Boulez und das Klavier (2013)
- Jacqueline Fontyn und das Konzert (2014)
- Juan Allende-Blin und das Ensemble (2016)
