= Wesemann =

Wesemann is a German surname. Notable people with the surname include:

- Hans Wesemann (1895–1971), German journalist and Gestapo agent
- Martin Wesemann (born 1984), South African racing cyclist
- Moritz Wesemann (born 2002), German diver
- Steffen Wesemann (born 1971), Swiss-German road racing cyclist, son of Wolfgang
- Wolfgang Wesemann (1949–2025), German cyclist
