= Evrim Demirel =

Turkish composer and jazz pianist

- Born: November 17, 1977 (age 48); İzmir, Turkey
- Genres: Contemporary classical music, jazz
- Occupations: Composer, Jazz Pianist
- Label: Kalan Music,
- Website: www.evrimdemirel.net

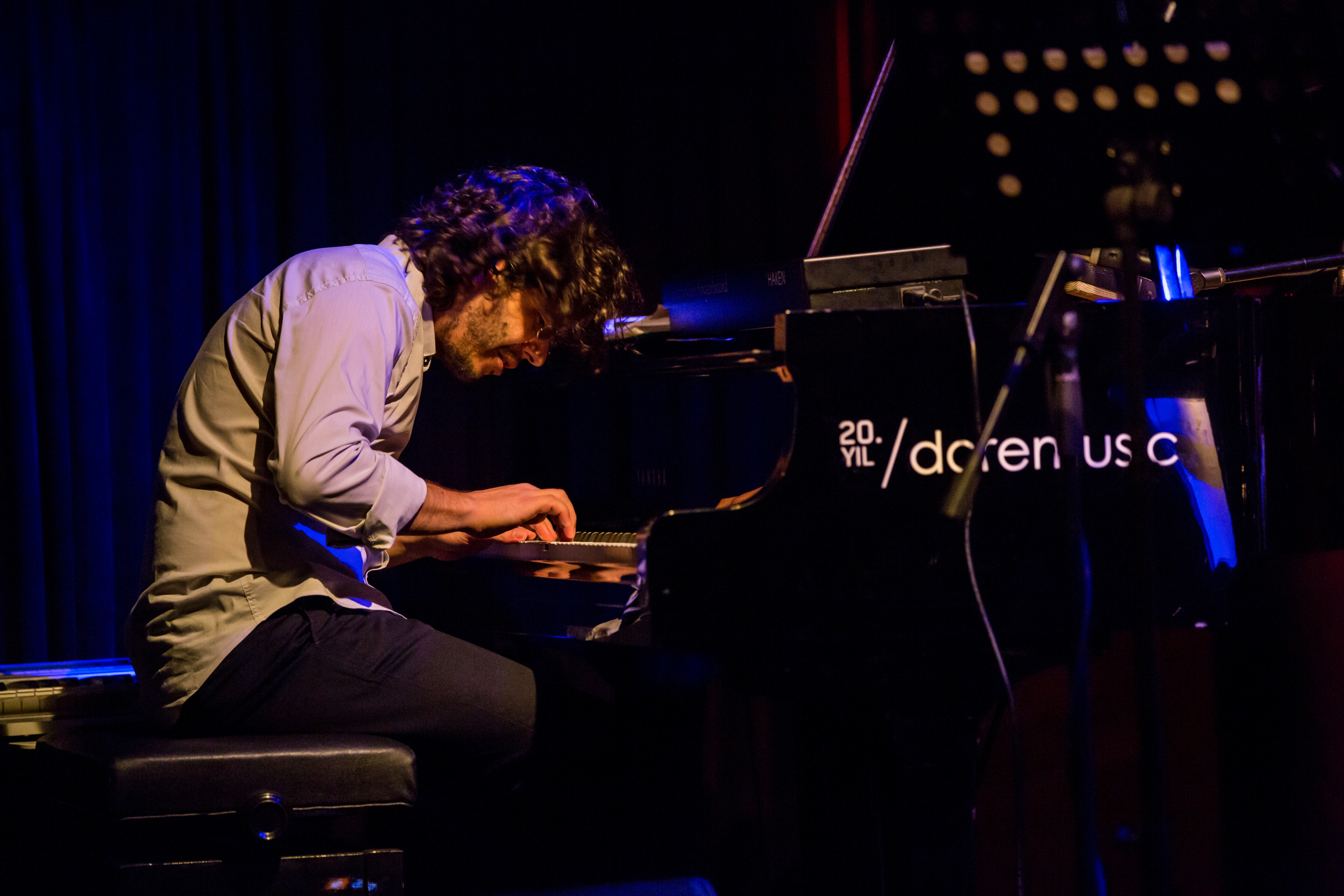
Evrim Demirel

Evrim Demirel (born November 17, 1977) is a Turkish composer and jazz pianist.

Evrim Demirel was educated in Izmir High School of Fine Arts and he studied piano with Nergis Sakirzade. Then he enrolled at Bilkent University in Ankara becoming a student in the Theory-Composition Department of the Music and Performing Arts Faculty. He earned his B.A. from this institution studying composition with Elhan Bakihanov, and went to the Netherlands for further music studies in Rotterdam Conservatory. He studied jazz piano under Rob van Kreeveld, electronic music under Rene Uijlenhoet and composition under Klaas de Vries and graduated from the composition and jazz- piano departments in 2005. Afterwards he has studied composition with Theo Loevendie in Amsterdam Conservatory and obtained his master's degree in 2007.

Demirel is known for his citations of styles and elements which could be called postmodern.

== Works ==
=== Orchestra ===
- 2011 Concerto for Saxophone and Orchestra; for soprano/alto Saxophones and orchestra.
- 2010 Chamber Concerto; for violin, viola, piano and string orchestra.
- 2010 Fasıl No1; for kanun, ney, kemence, ud and orchestra.
- 2009 Symphony of Dialogue; for traditional Qur'an singer, soprano, baritone and orchestra.
- 2007 Five Pieces; for string orchestra.
- 2007 Devinim; for tanbur, kanun and string orchestra.
- 2006 Heterophonic; for orchestra.
- 2004 Ottoman Miniatures; for orchestra.
- 2004 Four Folk Songs From Anatolia; for soprano and 25 European and non-European instruments.
- 2003 Evolution; orchestra.

=== Chamber music ===
- 2010 Sint Nikolaas Suite; for tenor, children choir, piano, vibraphone, violin, viola cello, double bass.
- 2009 Kwintolen (Beshleme); for oboe, clarinet, alto saxophone, bass clarinet, bassoon.
- 2009 "The Porcelain Rabbit" (music for theatre); for violin, clarinet/bass clarinet and percussion.
- 2008 Darb-ı dügah; for kemençe, kanun, flute, clarinet, bass clarinet, harp, viola, cello, double bass.
- 2008 Cross-Linked; (version 2008) "Concerto for jazz pianist"; piano, flute, oboe, clarinet, bassoon, harp, violin, viola, cello, double bass.
- 2008 Oran - Orantı; (revised and premiered in 2013) for flute, oboe, clarinet, bassoon, piano, violin, viola, cello, double bass.
- 2008 Molto Rexlexivo; for piano and bass clarinet.
- 2007 The Lake; (revised in 2013) for soprano, clarinet, viola, piano.
- 2006 Monologue; for duduk and tenor recorder.
- 2006 Saz Semaisi No. 2; for Eb clarinet, violin, cello, harp, piano.
- 2006 Quotations; flute/piccolo, oboe, Eb clarinet, bass clarinet, bassoon, horn, piano, harp, vibraphone/Turkish drum, violin, viola, cello, double bass.
- 2005 Makamsız; for recorder, kanun, viola da gamba, cello, marimba, darbuka.
- 2005 Saba In Istanbul; setar, ud, cornet, viola da gamba, bendir, tombak.
- 2004 Saz Semaisi No. 1; for Eb clarinet, violin, piano.
- 2004 Zeybek; for flute, oboe, clarinet, bassoon, horn, trompet, trombone, tuba, piano, percussion.
- 2003 Telvin; for flute, oboe, clarinet, violin, viola, cello, double bass, guitar, mandolin, harp, darbuka, marimba.

=== Solo Piano and Jazz Combo ===
- 2008 Melankoli
- 2008 In B
- 2006 Tea of Loevendie
- 2005 Blues Extended
- 2005 Bosphorus
- 2004 Davetiye
- 2003 Kucuk Ada

== Discography ==
- 2006 Makamsiz; Kalan Music.
- 2007 Red &White Blues; Attaca Records Piano: Marcel Worms
- 2012 Ada; Evrim Demirel Ensemble, Kalan Music.

== Recognition ==
- 2004 2nd prize in Young Composers Award of Holland Symfonia.
- 2003 nominated for International Lepo Sumera Composition Contest for Young Composers.

== About ==
"Combining Western and non-Western instruments Demirel explores a wide variety of timbres. He does this with a keen intellectual understanding of the various elements he works with, achieving an extraordinary freshness in his music."

Rene Van Peer - Critic

Being acquainted with Turkish composers since forty years or so, it is extremely refreshing for me to experience a young highly talented Turkish composer like Evrim Demirel who is capable of exploiting his Turkish roots in music in a more abstract way than the use of folk melodies. Of course there is nothing against that, as we know from Bartók, but as Bartók has shown also, it is more valuable, though more difficult, to integrate elements of folk traditions or any other tradition into a personal idiom. I experience a great joy seeing Evrim going his way on this Path.

Theo Loevendie - Composer
