= Joey Roukens =

Dutch composer

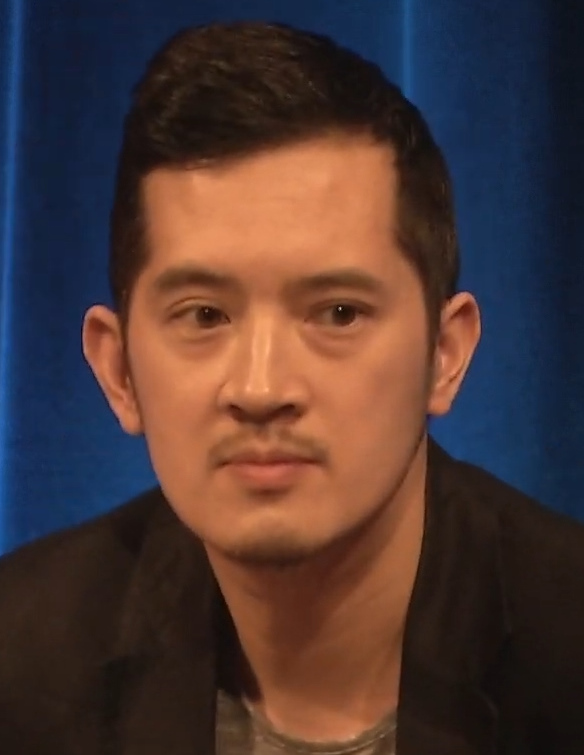
Joey Roukens in 2020

Joey Roukens (born 28 March 1982) is a Dutch composer of contemporary classical music.

Roukens was born in Schiedam, and studied composition with Klaas de Vries at Codarts University for the Arts and psychology at Leiden University. Roukens also studied piano privately with Ton Hartsuiker. His works have been performed by, among others, the Royal Concertgebouw Orchestra, the Netherlands Philharmonic Orchestra, the Rotterdam Philharmonic Orchestra, the New York Philharmonic, Asko/Schönberg, the Dudok Quartet Amsterdam, Colin Currie and Lucas and Arthur Jussen. His output includes orchestral works, ensemble works, chamber music, solo instrumental works and opera and ballet music. Notable works include the double piano concerto In Unison (2017), the Fourth String Quartet What Remains (2019), the ballet Dorian (2020, rev. 2022), the Symphony No.1 'Kaleidoscopic' (2021) and a Requiem for mixed choir, percussion and strings (2022).

In his music Roukens strives to move away from modernist dogmas in search for a more direct and eclectic idiom in which present and past, tonality and atonality, classical and non-classical influences can coexist in a natural way. In doing so, he tries to be open to as many different kinds and styles of music as possible, whether it be new styles or old styles, high culture or vernacular culture, ‘serious’ or popular music, western music or non-western music. For a long time, Roukens has also been active in pop music.
