= César de Oliveira =

Portuguese composer

César de Oliveira (born 17 May 1977 in Porto) is a Portuguese composer.
