= Cybele Records =

German record label

- Founded: 1994
- Founder: Ingo Schmidt-Lucas
- Genre: Classical music
- Country of origin: Germany
- Location: Düsseldorf
- Official website: www.cybele.de

Cybele Records is a German record label based in Düsseldorf, specializing in classical music, namely contemporary music. Founded in 1994, their motto is "Klassik der Zukunft" (Classics of the future), focused on contemporary composers and advanced recording technologies such as Super Audio CD and surround sound.

== History ==
The company was founded in 1994 by Ingo Schmidt-Lucas who planned to publish contemporary music, literature and rarely recorded piece (Nischenrepertoire), but also to present classical music in a new sound. Cybele published "portraits" of contemporary composers such as Peter-Jan Wagemans and Graham Waterhouse, both in 2001.

In 2004 they celebrated their 10th anniversary with a CD of works by various artists and composers. They then began to publish Hörbücher (audiobooks) in a series Künstler im Gespräch, with Mirjam Wiesemann talking to artists about their music. In 2009 the label was awarded the ECHO Classic for the audio book Die Prinzessin – Kindergeschichten, geschrieben und gesprochen von Arnold Schönberg. The edition of audio books received several awards, including in 2011 the prize for "Beste verlegerische Leistung" (best editorial achievement) of the Deutscher Hörbuchpreis.

In 2009 Cybele recorded a first volume of Piano Works During & After Russian Futurism, played by Thomas Günther, including works by Nikolai Obuchov, Ivan Wyschnegradsky and Sergei Protopopov. A second volume followed in 2014, with works by Arthur Vincent Lourie and Protopopov. In 2016 they published the complete organ works of Max Reger, played by Martin Schmeding on thirteen different organs from the composer's time; the recording was selected as "recording of the month" (October) by MusicWeb International.

== See also ==
- List of record labels
