= Leopold (prize) =

Leopold is a biennial German media prize for music for children, subtitled "Gute Musik für Kinder" (Good music for children).

The price was initiated in 1997 by the Verband deutscher Musikschulen (VDM, association of German music schools), supported by the Federal Ministry of Family Affairs, Senior Citizens, Women and Youth as a quality label for recommended recordings of music for children.

From 2001, the broadcaster Westdeutscher Rundfunk has been a cultural partner of the VdM. Therefore, the award ceremonies are normally held at the hall Funkhaus Wallrafplatz in Cologne.
