= Ratko Delorko =

German musician

- Born: August 15, 1959 (age 66); Hamburg, West Germany
- Occupation: Composer
- Instrument: Piano

Mario-Ratko Delorko, also known as Ratko Delorko, is a Croatian pianist, composer, producer and conductor who lives in Germany.

He is not to be confused with homonym Croatian opera singer (tenor) Mario-Ratko Delorko (1916–2002), also known as Ratko Delorko.

== Biography ==
He was born in Hamburg in 1959 and studied in Düsseldorf, Cologne and Munich. He has performed at concerts worldwide and his repertoire covers works from baroque to contemporary music. He has recorded Gershwin’s complete piano oeuvre, Mozart piano concertos, and a live Chopin recital at the Berlin Philharmonic. He also performs at open-air events, and has held a concert in the Dachstein Ice Cave in the Austrian Alps.

Delorko has many first recordings of previously unknown compositions. He also plays ‘Jazz meets Classic’ concerts together with Christoph Spendel.

Ratko Delorko’s compositions include music for piano, chamber music, orchestral works and electronic music. He has recorded a CD with the title The History of the Piano for the New Classic Colours label. This album includes selections from the baroque era to contemporary, performed on twenty different original keyboard instruments of the respective eras.

Ratko Delorko currently teaches Master Classes in Europe, the USA, and Asia. He lectures at the Music University of Frankfurt, Germany in addition to his tour schedule. He also writes articles and tests instruments and music software for music magazines.

== Compositions ==
- Die Ey, Opera (1991) for Vocalists, Computer, Synthetic Drums and Piano, Libretto Kai Metzger, Uraufführung Düsseldorf 1991
- ..später vielleicht dann die Heimkehr (1996) Oratorium for Soprano, Tenor, Narrator, Piano and Synthesizer
- Mörrfried-Lieder for Baritone and Piano after Texts from Kai Metzger (1998)
- Blattspiel (1996) for Oboe und Piano
- Zeitklang, Zyklus for Piano I & II (1984–1987) Published by Zimmermann Frankfurt
- Sonata for Two Pianos (1991)
- MIDI-Sonata for Audioforte-Grand, Computer and Synthesizer (1993)
- Dorint-Suite (1997) for Piano
- Otmar Alt-Sonata (1999) for Piano
- Drei Spiele für Kinderklavier (1993)

== Discography ==
- Gershwin, Virtuoso Piano Music on Aurophon, Sony Music, Zeitklang
- Mozart, Piano Concertos KV 413. 414. 175 as soloist and conductor on Aurophon, Sony Music, Zeitklang
- Recital I, recorded in Italy on Aurophon, Zeitklang
- New Music for Toy Piano on SST
- Beethoven Piano Concertos on Period Instruments WoO 4 and Nr. 2 on Attacca
- Chopin-Recital live from Berlin Philharmonic Hall on Zeitklang
- CD-Extra The Piano History on NCC
- Europiano: 15 Young European Pianists on Zeitklang
- The History of the Steinway Piano on Zeitklang
- DVD & CD, Jazz meets Classic Piano Duet on Zeitklang
- Recital II, recorded in the USA on Zeitklang
- Audiobook, Papillons with Reiner Schöne on Zeitklang
- Crescendo Piano History Audiobook with Students of Music University Graz
