= Peter-Jan Wagemans =

Dutch composer

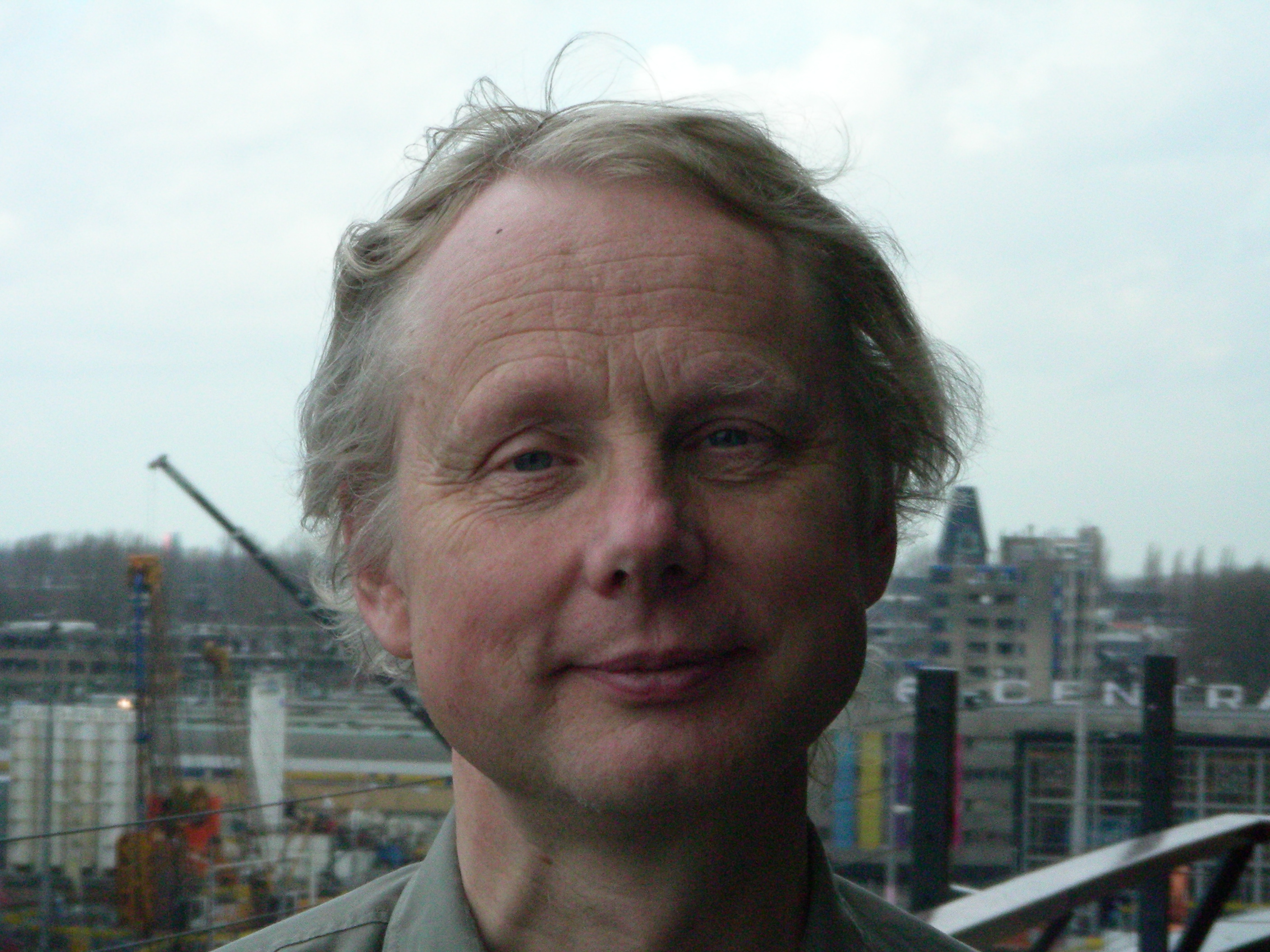
Peter-Jan Wagemans in 2006

Peter-Jan Wagemans (The Hague, September 7, 1952) is a Dutch composer.

Wagemans studied organ (diploma 1974), composition with Jan van Vlijmen (diploma 1975) and music theory (diploma 1977) at the Royal Conservatory of The Hague. After his studies he also worked with Klaus Huber in Freiburg.

According to Wagemans' philosophy, music is shaped in the observation of the listener. Therefore, Wagemans tries to focus on ways a work can be recognised, rather than on its fundamental structure. He generally makes use of what he prefers to call musical archetypes, unifying ambivalent elements.

Peter-Jan Wagemans is one of the founders of the Rotterdam School. He teaches composition and music theory at the Rotterdam Conservatory since 1984.

Wagemans founded the Dutch Doelen Ensemble and for some years was also the artistic director of the Amsterdam-based Holland Symfonia.

== Selected Composition ==
=== Operas ===
- Legende (opera) (2004-2006)
- Andreas weent (Andreas weeps) opera (2012)

=== Orchestral works ===
- Muziek I (1974)
- Muziek II (1977, rev. 1979)
- Muziek III (1986, rev. 1987)
- Muziek IV (1988)
- Requiem (1992/1994)
- Symphony no. 6, Panthalassa (1994)
- The City and the Angel (1996/1997)
- Symphony no. 7 (1998/1999)
- Moloch (2000)

=== Chamber music ===
- Het landschap - for piano solo (1989/90)
- Concerto - for 2 pianos (1993)
- Ewig - for piano and percussion (1993)
- String Quartet (1997/1998)
- Frage: worauf hoffen? - for 2 celli (1999)
- Het V-de Boek (2001/2002)

== Discography ==
- 1993 Einstein on the Beach (Elektra Nonesuch)
- 1995 Highlights (Composers' Voice)
- 1997 Het landschap (Attacca Babel)
- 2001 Portrait (Cybele Records)
