= Anthony Payne =

English composer, critic and musicologist (1936–2021)

- Born: 2 August 1936; London, UK
- Died: 30 April 2021 (aged 84); Islington, Greater London, UK (Note: As of Lennie (2013), Payne and Manning were known to have lived in Islington since 1970. They presumably lived there until the end of their lives as no other sources suggest otherwise.)
- Occupations: Composer; critic; musicologist
- Works: List of compositions
- Spouse: Jane Manning
- Website: www.anthonypayne.org.uk

Anthony Edward Payne (2 August 1936 – 30 April 2021) was an English composer, music critic and musicologist. He is best known for his acclaimed completion of Edward Elgar's third symphony, which gained wide acceptance into Elgar's oeuvre. Payne is particularly noted for his chamber music, much of which was written for his wife, the soprano Jane Manning, and the couple's new music ensemble Jane's Minstrels. Initially an unrelenting proponent of modernist music, by the 1980s his compositions had embraced aspects of the late English romanticism, described by his colleague Susan Bradshaw as "modernized nostalgia".

Born in London, Payne first seriously studied music at Durham University. His professional career began around 1969 with his first major work, the staunchly modernist Phoenix Mass for choir and brass band. He continued to write choral and vocal works, almost exclusively to British poets. From his 1981 chamber work A Day in the Life of a Mayfly on, he synthesised modernism with the English romanticism of Elgar, Delius and Vaughan Williams. Two orchestral commissions for The Proms, The Spirit's Harvest (1985) and Time's Arrow (1990) were well received. After his successful completion of Elgar's unfinished third symphony, Payne became unsure of his musical identity. He found difficulty in subsequent composition until a series of orchestral works for the Proms, Visions and Journeys (2002), The Period of Cosmographie (2010) and Of Land, Sea and Sky (2016).

Payne held academic posts at various institutions throughout his career, including Mills College, the London College of Music, the Sydney Conservatorium of Music, the University of Western Australia and the University of East Anglia. Despite regular commissions from a variety of English ensembles, he was not a particularly mainstream composer and was forced to supplement his income with writings. A noted critic, he wrote for The Daily Telegraph, The Independent and Country Life. Other writings include publications on a variety of musical topics, notably Schoenberg (1968)—a study on the composer Arnold Schoenberg—and numerous works on the music of Frank Bridge, to whom he was particularly devoted.

== Life and career ==
=== Youth and education (1936–1964) ===
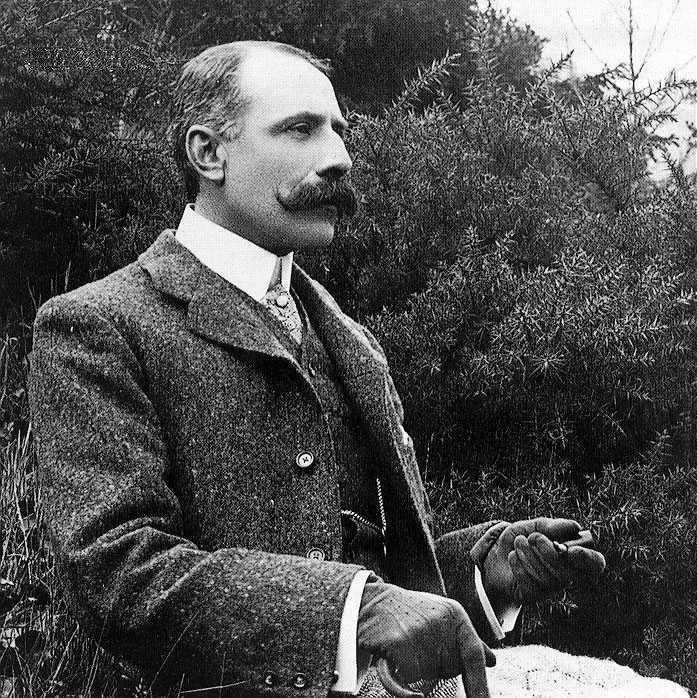
Payne's principal compositional influences Delius and Vaughan Williams, top, and Elgar, bottom

Anthony Edward Payne was born in London on 2 August 1936 to Edward and Muriel (née Stroud) Payne; his father was a civil servant. Not from a particularly musical background, at the age of 10 Payne went to see relatives in Godalming and first experienced classical music from a radio broadcast of Brahms's Symphony No. 1. Recalling the significance of the moment in a 2013 interview with Time Out, he said he "was absolutely translated" and "hooked like a fish". A recording he was given the next year of Tchaikovsky's Piano Concerto No. 1 solidified his interest; he began composing at around age 11. From 1947 to 1955, Payne attended Dulwich College where he mainly studied the classics, though he still found time to engage in music. Besides private study with Stanley Wilson, he worked on an orchestral suite and piano sonata and regularly played clarinet with Alan Hacker. Payne began further exploration of Western Classical repertoire, particularly Mozart and Haydn of the classical period and the Romantics Dvořák and Sibelius. However, his principal compositional inspirations were the late English Romantics Elgar, Delius and Vaughan Williams, influences which are increasingly prominent in various early works: two—in addition to the earlier one—piano sonatas, a clarinet sonata, and the Polyphonic suite.

After a brief stint in the Royal Corps of Signals (1955–1957), Payne read music at the Durham University Department of Music in St Cuthbert's Society, Durham University (1958–1961). During this time, studying Palestrinian counterpoint and working with the musicologist Peter Evans assisted the growth of his musical maturity. Around his graduation, he had a nervous breakdown and largely stopped composing for four years. He spent his hiatus primarily as a freelance music critic and musicologist. Before his halting of composition, in 1959 Payne had drafted parts of the symphonic poem It Happened Once, and returning to it in 1964 under the name of Liebestod, he began to discover a newly personal style of composition.

=== Emerging composer (1965–1980) ===
Payne's new compositional style was first fully realised in the Phoenix Mass for SATB choir and brass, which he began in 1965 and finished by 1969. Commentators note that the 'Phoenix' of the title is both metaphorical and literal, because it is, in the words of music critic Barry Millington, "a symbolic revivification of his compositional ambitions with a newly fashioned method of structural organisation." Characterised by the use of harmonic intervals for specific themes and movements, Payne declared the work to be his first major composition. Payne married the soprano Jane Manning in 1966.

Paraphrases and Cadenzas (1969), his next work, was a 14-minute piece for viola, clarinet and piano, that shared much of the harmonic language of the Phoenix Mass. Payne later revised both the Phoenix Mass and Paraphrases and Cadenzas in 1972 and 1978 respectively. Commissioned and premiered by the Baccholian Singers of London in 1970, his Two Songs without Words for five unaccompanied male voices shifted focus from intervallic organization to music based on numerology. Payne's Sonatas and Ricercars premiered the next year; the nine-movement work featured four full ensemble movements and five movements of solos for flute, oboe, clarinet, bassoon, horn. Later in 1971 Payne wrote Paean for solo piano, in which a synthesis of the aria and toccata forms is dominated by numerology and tone clusters. Throughout 1972 and early 1973, various writing commissions halted his music composition. By 1970 Payne and Manning had moved to a house in Islington, where they lived until the end of their lives.

In the Spring of 1973 Payne returned to Liebestod, but quickly set it aside to work on the unaccompanied vocal piece A Little Passiontide Cant to an anonymous text from 14th-century England, and later his Concerto for Orchestra (1974) commissioned by Richard Bradshaw and the New London Ensemble. The latter was his largest-scale work to date, featuring ritornellos and—like the Sonatas and Ricercars—rotating instrumental solos. For 16 voices and text by Thomas Hardy, Payne won the Radcliffe Award for another unaccompanied vocal piece, First Sight of Her and After (1975). Though now he planned to finish Liebestod, (Note: Based on Payne's list of compositions in Bradshaw (2010), it appears he never completed Liebestod.) he was commissioned by the Grimethorpe Colliery Band and Elgar Howarth so instead wrote a tone poem-funeral ode inspired by Beowulf, Fire on Whaleness (1975–1976), for brass band. Throughout 1976 to 1979, Payne embarked on four more choral pieces, three of which were by British figures: The World's Winter (1976, text by Alfred, Lord Tennyson); The Sea of Glass (1977, text from the Book of Revelation); A Little Ascension Cant (1977, text attributed to Cynewulf); and A Little Whitsuntide Cant (1977, text by Emily Brontë). He was commissioned by the BBC Proms for The Stones and Lonely Places Sing (1979), a tone poem that has a numerology-based structure and evokes "the bleak coastline of western Britain and Ireland".

=== English Romanticism (1981–1992) ===
External audio
- A Day in the Life of a Mayfly performed by Jane's Minstrels
- A Day in the Life of a Mayfly

In the A Day in the Life of a Mayfly (1981) Payne first embraced his earlier English Romantic influences, and synthesised them with his predominant modernist style; Susan Bradshaw described this as "modernized nostalgia". Commissioned by the Fires of London and premiered 24 September 1981 at the Queen Elizabeth Hall, London, A Day in the Life of a Mayfly soon became Payne's best known work up to that point. He continued his renewal of the English tradition in his next major orchestral work, The Spirit's Harvest, which was his second commission for the Proms. Throughout the 1980s he engaged in a variety of genres; he wrote solo, choral, orchestral, brass and chamber works. Also in the 1980s, he held various academic posts. He spent 1983 as a visiting professor at Mills College, California and from 1983 to 1985–6 taught composition at the London College of Music. (Note: Sources differ on the timeframe of his visiting professorship at Mills College, California; Bradshaw (2010) says it lasted until 1986 while The Telegraph (2021) records 1985.) During 1986 he was also a composition professor at the Sydney Conservatorium of Music, New South Wales. Among his students was the composer Enid Luff.

In 1988 he co-founded the new music ensemble Jane's Minstrels with Manning. Many of his works, such as transcriptions of seven songs by Peter Warlock entitled the Aspects of Love and Contentment (1991), were composed for Jane's Minstrels. The group also performed music by Purcell, Elgar, Bridge, Grainger, Webern, Schoenberg, and Maxwell Davies.

Payne's next important orchestral work, Time's Arrow (1990) was his third orchestral commission for the BBC Proms. The piece was well received and described by Millington as "one of his finest achievements". The work is a musical depiction of the Big Bang, beginning in almost complete silence and utilizing dense brass and percussion textures to represent the immensity of the subject. Another orchestral work, Symphonies of Wind and Rain (1991), was commissioned by the Endymion Ensemble and premiered the following year. (Note: Although Wise Music Classical lists Symphonies of Wind and Rain as being finished in 1992, Bradshaw (2010) and Payne's own website list the work as from 1991.)

=== Elgar's Third Symphony (1993–1997) ===
"It was an absolute tour de force of insight and imagination into Elgar's world... [Payne] hadn't initially intended to try to reconstruct the piece – but eventually he realised there was a lot more there than anyone imagined."

— Colin Matthews on Payne's completion

Payne's realisation of the sketches for Edward Elgar's incomplete Third Symphony took several years to complete. When Elgar died in 1934, he left an incomplete score for a third symphony commissioned by the BBC. Elgar's own thoughts on posthumous completions were ambiguous: though he had expressed a wish that no-one should 'tinker' with the sketches, but also said "If I can't complete the Third Symphony, somebody will complete it". Although initially reluctant to allow anyone to use this material, the Elgar family realised that in 2005 the sketches would come out of copyright. After hearing Payne's 1995 radio talk on his ideas, the composer's estate approved his elaboration, which Payne had been working on since 1993, having studied the sketches since 1972. Elgar's sketches were fragmentary; he often wrote inconsistently and haphazardly, recording unrelated ideas side by side in the 130 pages—141 individual sketches—that he left behind.

Payne's version of the symphony, titled Edward Elgar: the sketches for Symphony No 3 elaborated by Anthony Payne, was first performed in February 1998 at the Royal Festival Hall, London by Sir Andrew Davis and the BBC Symphony Orchestra. The work was immediately acclaimed and after it quickly began receiving further performances, totalling over 150 performances in four years. As of 2021 the piece has been recorded six times, and it has gained wide acceptance into Elgar's oeuvre. Payne released a book in 1998, Elgar's Third Symphony: The Story of the Reconstruction, discussing his process of completion for the work.

While Payne worked on the symphony from 1993 to 1997, he simultaneously engaged in commissions for various English ensembles: Hidden Music (1992) for the London Festival Orchestra; Orchestral Variations – The Seeds Long Hidden (1994) for the English Chamber Orchestra; and Empty Landscape – Heart's Ease (1995) for the Nash Ensemble. Other activities during this time include his tenure as the co-artistic director of the 1994 Spitalfields Music with Judith Weir and Michael Berkeley, and teaching composition at the University of Western Australia during 1996.

=== Later career and death (1998–2021) ===
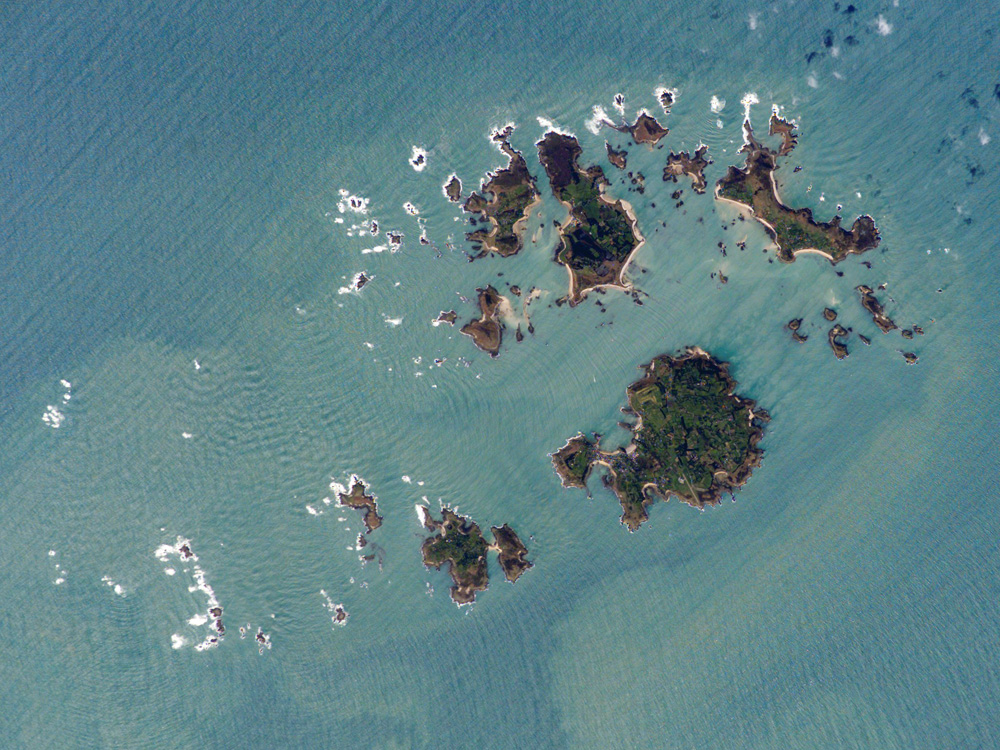
The Isles of Scilly which inspired Payne's acclaimed Visions and Journeys (2002) for orchestra

After his international success in completing Elgar's 3rd symphony, Payne initially found difficulty in composing further. Payne explained "It was rather like an actor must feel in a role – I was playing Elgar to the best of my ability. However, I was seriously worried at the end of it that I would not be able to be myself again. For 18 months I was living inside this work. It was fantastic while I was doing it, but I thought: How can I possibly get back to writing my stuff?". He wrote the Micro-Sonata (1997) and Hommage to Debussy (1998)—his first solo piano works since 1980. Payne's resurgence in large-scale composition came with the Isles of Scilly-inspired Visions and Journeys (2002), an orchestral commission for the Proms that was especially well received.

Payne subsequently also composed a version of Pomp and Circumstance March No. 6 from Elgar's incomplete sketches for the work, which received its first performance under the baton of Sir Andrew Davis at a Prom concert on 2 August 2006 – Payne's 70th birthday. From 2012 to 2013, Payne was a Professorial Fellow the University of East Anglia's composition department. His String Quartet No. 2 (2010) won the Chamber category of the 2011 British Composer Awards. His last major work, Of Land, Sea and Sky (2016) was a commission for The Proms. The piece was written around his 80th birthday, and took inspiration from the sounds of horses' hooves, masses of clouds and the landscape art of Arthur Streeton.

Payne died on 30 April 2021. He was 84, and died a month after the death of his wife, which reportedly affected his health. His colleague and fellow composer Colin Matthews noted that "They were inseparable in life, and I suppose it's not a surprise that he would follow her so soon after". Payne and Manning had no children, but were survived by a nephew and two nieces.

== Music ==
=== General character ===
Though Payne was drawn to various Classical and Romantic composers in his youth, the late English Romanticism of Elgar, Delius and Vaughan Williams proved to be the most impactful on his work. His success from the Elgar Symphony completion led to orchestrations of various works by all three; he likened Vaughan Williams in particular to a "musical godfather". These influences are considerably apparent in the works from his time at Dulwich and Durham. By the mid-1960s, Payne began to readily engage with modernist aesthetics, looking for musical content by more narrow means. (Note: He later explained this conflux of influences: "I wanted to marry English late romanticism with the European avant-garde of the 1960s. Everyone thought I was mad, to think of Gerhard, Lutoslawski, and Vaughan Williams, all in the same piece. But they were the things I was passionate about, and I refused to believe one had to exclude the other")

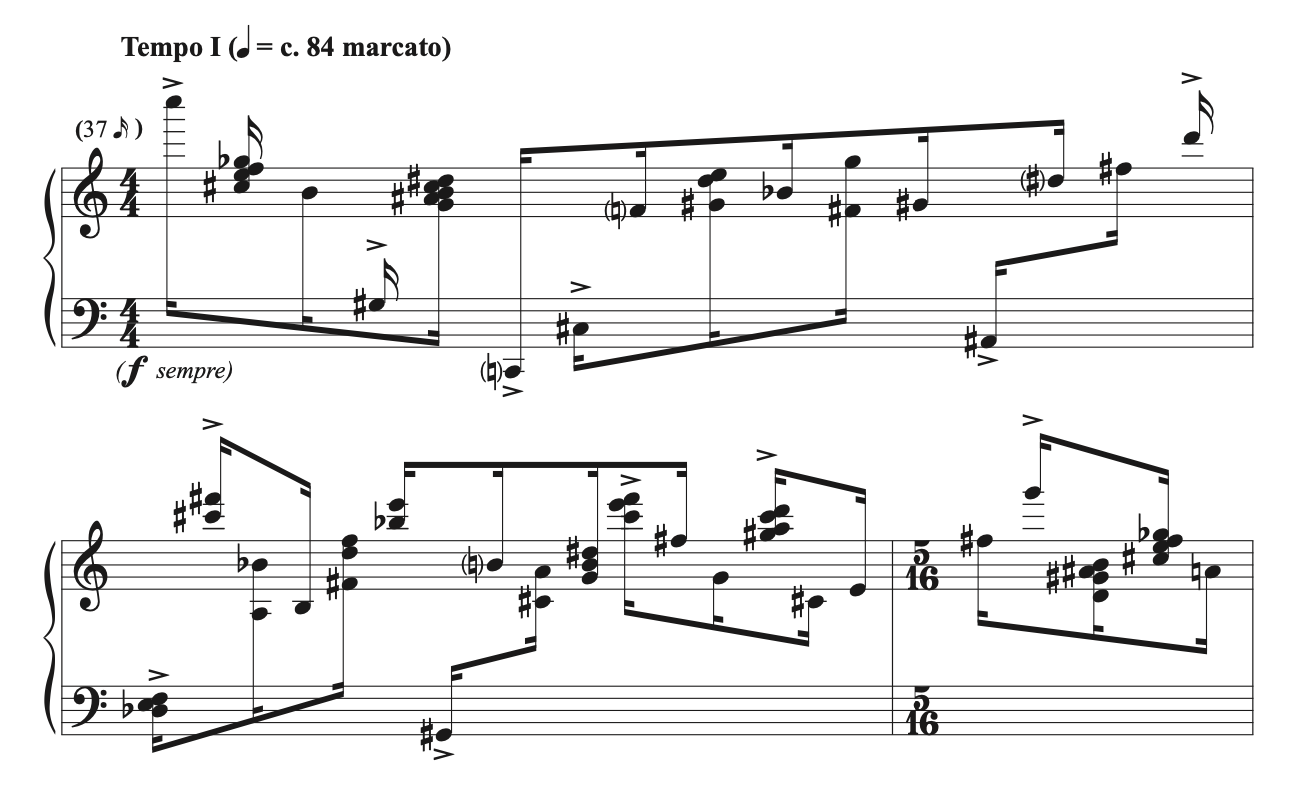
In this excerpt Paean (1971) for solo piano, Payne created a passage based on the pre-generated number 37, which is the amount of 16th notes

As a part of his interest in modernistic music, each movement of the Phoenix Mass centres on a particular interval, such as whole tones in the Gloria and major thirds in the Sanctus. Paraphrases and Cadenzas (1969) also utilises specific intervallic designations for each movement, each of which align with a movement of the Mass. Another interest of Payne's was numerology; the virtuosic Paean (1971) is built on a series of sequences based on a random number table: 7 3 4 1 1 2 5 2 1 9 5 5 7 8 4 2 3 3 4 9 9 6. The Stones and Lonely Places Sing (1979) uses numerology of a different fashion; the proportions of 3 2 7 4 1 6 5 decide the phrase length, resulting in phrases of 21 bars (3x7), 14 bars (2x7), 49 bars (7x7), 28 bars (7x4), 7 bars (7x1), 42 bars (7x6) and 35 bars (7x5). Other musical trademarks include wide spaced harmonies and frequent alternation between strict and fluid rhythmic frameworks.

Apart from opera, Payne engaged in most traditional genres: large-scale orchestral, brass band, chamber works, solo piano, solo strings, choral works and song cycles. However, he was principally a composer of chamber music, much of which was written for Jane's Minstrels and often included vocal parts specifically for Manning. Other chamber ensembles Payne wrote compositions for include the Baccholian Singers of London, New London Ensemble, the Fires of London, the Endymion Ensemble, the London Festival Orchestra, the English Chamber Orchestra and the Nash Ensemble. Bradshaw asserts that these chamber works most clearly demonstrate the compositional evolution of Payne throughout his career. Despite these regular commissions, Payne said in 2005 that after 30 years as a composer he made only what would be £15,000 in 2020 annually. He was forced to supplement his composition with work as a music critic and musicologist. Reflecting on this, Payne said "Still, you do it for love, don't you?".

=== Legacy and reputation ===
Payne was not a particularly mainstream composer of contemporary classical music, in part from his straddling the worlds of English Romanticism and modernism. Payne reflected on this, recalling his 2003 Radio 3 British Composer Awards, saying "I was absolutely amazed... because I’m one of those composers who never win awards." Along these lines, Michael White of The Independent described Payne as "a quiet but thoughtful presence in British music [that] always strikes me as a kind of anchorage in sanity, confirming the continuing life of trusted values".

Payne made substantial contributions to both the orchestral and choral/vocal repertoires: his Time's Arrow (1990) and Visions and Journeys (2002) for orchestra were acclaimed, and he was a prolific composer of song cycles. However, he remains most noted as a composer of chamber music; he was best known for the chamber work A Day in the Life of a Mayfly (1981) before his 1997 Elgar completion. Though he developed a highly individual style, The Telegraph asserts that Payne's legacy is "inevitably dominated" by his Elgar completion.

At the Proms on 13 August 2021, the BBC Symphony Orchestra played Payne's Spring’s Shining Wake as a memorial tribute.

=== Selected recordings ===
Selected recordings of compositions by Anthony Payne
| Year | Album (Note: Although some albums contain works by composers other than Payne, only works by Payne are listed.) | Performers (conductor) | Label |
|---|---|---|---|
| 1990 | Images & Impressions Contents: A 1940s Childhood (1989) (The 1989 version for flute and harp) | Judith Hall, flute; Elinor Bennett, harp | Nimbus Records NI5247 |
| 1995 | Jane Manning Contents: Poems of Edward Thomas: "Adlestrop" (1989) (Piano quintet version) | Jane's Minstrels (Roger Montgomery) | NMC D025 |
| 1996 | Time's Arrow Contents: Time's Arrow (1990) | BBC Symphony Orchestra (Sir Andrew Davis) | NMC D037S |
| 1996 | Chroma Contents: Sea-Change (1988) | Chroma | Riverrun Records RVRCD56 |
| 1998 | Elgar/Payne: Sketches for Symphony No. 3 Contents: Edward Elgar: The Sketches for Symphony No 3 Elaborated by Anthony Payne (1997) | BBC Symphony Orchestra (Sir Andrew Davis) (Note: Anthony Payne, commentary; Robert Gibbs, violin; David Owen Norris, piano) | NMC D052 |
| 1998 | A Day in the Life of a Mayfly Contents: Symphonies of Wind and Rain (1991); The Songs and Streams in the Firmament (1986); Evening Land (1981); Paraphrases and Cadenzas (1969); A Day in the Life of a Mayfly (1981) | Jane's Minstrels (Roger Montgomery) | NMC D056 |
| 1999 | Spectrum; Spectrum 2: 50 contemporary works for solo piano Contents: Song Without End; Microsonata (1997) | Thalia Myers, piano | NMC D057 |
| 2001 | Invocations: Contemporary Viola Works Contents: Amid the Winds of Evening (1987) | Paul Silverthorne, viola; John Constable, piano | Black Box BBM1058 |
| 2002 | Purcell: Hail! Bright Cecilia: Plus Bright Cecilia Variations Contents: "Solenne" from Bright Cecilia, Variations on a Theme of Purcell (2002) | BBC Singers (Ronald Corp) | Musicians Benevolent Fund MBF1 |
| 2005 | In Flanders' Fields Contents: Poems of Edward Thomas: "Adlestrop" (2003) | Fiona Kimm, mezzo soprano; Andrew Bell, piano | Quartz Music QTZ2038 |
| 2007 | The Stones and Lonely Places Sing Contents: Empty Landscape – Heart's Ease (1995); Scenes from The Woodlanders (1999); Of Knots and Skeins (2000); Poems of Edward Thomas: "Words" (2003); Poems of Edward Thomas: "Lights Out" (2003); Poems of Edward Thomas: "Adlestrop" (2003); The Stones & Lonely Places Sing (1979) | Jane's Minstrels (Roger Montgomery) | NMC D130 |
| 2008 | Elgar/Payne: Symphony No. 3, Pomp and Circumstance March No. 6 Contents: Edward Elgar: The Sketches for Symphony No 3 Elaborated by Anthony Payne (1997); Pomp and Circumstance March No. 6 (2006) | Sapporo Symphony Orchestra (Tadaaki Otaka) | Signum Classics SIGCD118 |
| 2009 | Elgar/Payne The Crown of India Contents: The Crown of India (2008) | BBC Symphony Orchestra (Sir Andrew Davis) (Note: Clare Shearer, mezzo soprano; Gerald Finley, baritone; Barbara Marten, Deborah Mc Andrew, Joanna Mitchell, speakers; Sheffield Philharmonic Chorus) | Chandos CHAN10570 |
| 2010 | The NMC Songbook Contents: Ghost Train | Roderick Williams, baritone; Iain Burnside, piano | NMC D150 |
| 2010 | Sound census Contents: From a Mouthful of Air (2009) | Endymion (Quentin Poole) | NMC D160 |
| 2013 | Phoenix Mass Contents: Phoenix Mass (1969); Paean (1971); The World’s Winter: Nothing will die (1976); The World’s Winter: All things will die (1976); Horn Trio (2006) | Various | NMC D159 |
| 2024 | Visions and Journeys Contents: Visions and Journeys (2002); Half-Heard in the Stillness (1987); The Seeds Long Hidden (1994) | BBC Symphony Orchestra (Martyn Brabbins) (Sir Andrew Davis) | NMC D281 |

== List of compositions ==
List of compositions by Anthony Payne
| Title | Year | Genre |
|---|---|---|
=== Orchestral ===
| Suite from a Forgotten Ballet | 1955 rev. 1985 | Orchestral |
| Contrapuncti | 1958 rev. 1979 | Orchestral solo string quartet; string orchestra |
| Concerto for Orchestra | 1974 | Orchestral |
| Song of the Clouds | 1979–80 | Orchestral solo oboe, 2 horns, perc, string orchestra |
| Spring's Shining Wake | 1980–81 | Orchestral |
| Songs and Seascapes | 1984 | Orchestral string orchestra |
| The Spirit's Harvest | 1985 | Orchestral |
| Half-Heard in the Stillness | 1987 | Orchestral |
| Time's Arrow | 1989–90 | Orchestral |
| Symphonies of Wind and Rain | 1991 | Orchestral |
| Hidden Music | 1992 | Orchestral |
| Orchestral Variations: The Seeds Long Hidden | 1992–94 | Orchestral |
| Visions and Journeys | 2001–02 | Orchestral |
| Bright Cecilia, Variations on a Theme of Purcell (Note: The work set to variations was Purcell's Hail! Bright Cecilia.) with Lindberg, C. Matthews, Ruders, Sawer, Torke and Weir | 2002 | Orchestral |
| Windows on Eternity | 2006–07 | Orchestral |
| The Period of Cosmographie | 2010 | Orchestral |
| Of Land, Sea and Sky | 2016 | Orchestral; Orchestra and chorus |
| Variation XIII from Pictured Within: Birthday Variations for M.C.B. | 2019 | Orchestral; Orchestra |
=== Brass ===
| Fire on Whaleness | 1975–76 | Brass; Brass band, perc |
| Fanfares and Processional | 1986 | Brass hn, 4 tpt, 4 trbn, tuba |
| Echoes of Courtly Love | 1987 | Brass hn, tpt, flugel hn, trbn, tuba |
| River-race | 1990 | Brass; 4 hn, 4 tpt, 4 trbn, tuba, perc |
=== Chamber ===
| Paraphrases and Cadenzas | 1969 rev. 1978 | Chamber cl, va, pf |
| Sonatas and Ricercars (Wind Quintet) | 1970–71 | Chamber fl, ob, cl, bn, hn |
| String Quartet No. 1 | 1978 | Chamber; String quartet |
| Footfalls Echo in the Memory | 1978 | Chamber vn, pf |
| The Stones and Lonely Places Sing | 1978–79 | Chamber fl + pic, cl + b cl, hn, pf, vn, va, vc |
| A Day in the Life of a Mayfly | 1981 | Chamber fl + pic, cl, perc, pf, vn, vc |
| The Song Streams in the Firmament | 1986 | Chamber cl, 2 vn, va, vc, db |
| Consort Music | 1987–88 | Chamber; 2 vn, 2 va, vc |
| A 1940s Childhood | 1986–87 | Chamber fl, gui |
| A 1940s Childhood | 1989 | Chamber fl, hp |
| Sea-Change | 1988 | Chamber fl, cl, hp, 2 vn, va, vc |
| The Enchantress Plays | 1990 | Chamber bn, pf |
| Empty Landscape – Heart's Ease | 1994–95 | Chamber ob, cl, hn, vn, va, vc |
| Engines and Islands | 1996 | Chamber fl, cl, perc, pf, vn, va, vc |
| Piano Trio | 1988 | Chamber; Piano trio |
| Of Knots and Skeins | 2000 | Chamber vn, pf |
| Horn Trio | 2005–06 | Chamber; Horn trio |
| Piano Quintet | 2007 | Chamber; Piano quintet |
| Out of the Depths Comes Song | 2008 | Chamber vc, pf |
| From a Mouthful of Air | 2009 | Chamber tpt, hp, vn, va, vc |
| String Quartet No. 2 | 2010 | Chamber; String quartet |
| Piano Quartet | 2014 | Chamber; Piano Quartet |
| String Quartet No. 3 | 2018 | Chamber; String quartet |
=== Instrumental solos ===
| Paean | 1971 | Solo; Piano |
| Miniature Variations on a Theme of E.L. | 1980 | Solo; Piano |
| Reflections in the Sea of Glass | 1983 | Solo; Organ |
| Amid the Winds of Evening | 1987 | Solo; Viola |
| Song Without End | 1995 | Solo; Piano |
| Micro-Sonata | 1997 | Solo; Piano |
| Hommage to Debussy | 1998 | Solo; Piano |
| Storm Chorale | 2003 | Solo; Violin |
| Conundrum | 2004 | Solo; Cello |
=== Choral and vocal ===
| Phoenix Mass | 1969 rev. 1972 | Choral and vocal SATB, 3 trumpet, 3 trombone |
| Two Songs without Words | 1970 | Choral and vocal 5 male voices |
| A Little Passiontide Cant (Text from 14th-century England) | 1974 rev. 1984 | Choral and vocal SATB |
| First Sight of Her and After (Text by Thomas Hardy) | 1975 | Choral and vocal 16 solo voices |
| First Sight of Her and After (Text by Thomas Hardy) | 1988 | Choral and vocal SATB, ob, cl, bn, hn, perc, vn, va, vc, db |
| The World's Winter (Text by Alfred, Lord Tennyson) | 1976 | Choral and vocal Soprano, flute + piccolo, oboe, clarinet |
| The Sea of Glass (Text from the Book of Revelation) | 1977 | Choral and vocal SATB, organ |
| A Little Ascension Cant (Text attributed to Cynewulf) | 1977 rev. 1984 | Choral and vocal SATB |
| A Little Whitsuntide Cant (Text by Emily Brontë) | 1977 rev. 1984 | Choral and vocal SATB |
| Evening Land (Text by Pär Lagerkvist) | 1980–81 | Choral and vocal Soprano, piano |
| A Little Christmas Cant (Text from traditional carol texts) | 1983 | Choral and vocal SATB |
| Alleluias and Hockets (after Machaut) | 1987 | Choral and vocal SATB, 2 ob, eng hn, 2 bn, 2 tpt, 3 trbn |
| Adlestrop (Text by Edward Thomas) | 1989 | Choral and vocal Soprano, piano |
| First Sight of Her and After (Text by Thomas Hardy) | 1989 | Choral and vocal SATB, ob, cl, bn, hn, perc, vn, va, vc, db |
| Aspects of Love and Contentment (8 Songs of Peter Warlock) | 1991 | Choral and vocal S, fl, ob, cl, hn, hp, str qt |
| Break, break, break (Text by Alfred, Lord Tennyson) | 1996 | Choral and vocal SATB |
| From the Woodlanders (Text by Thomas Hardy) | 1999 | Choral and vocal Soprano, 2 clarinets, violin, cello |
| Betwixt Heaven and Charing Cross (Text by Francis Thompson) | 2001 | Choral and vocal SATB |
| Poems of Edward Thomas (Text by Edward Thomas) | 2002–03 | Choral and vocal Soprano, piano, violin, vila, cello |
| Ghost Train (Text by Payne, after Pär Lagerkvist) | 2008 | Choral and vocal Baritone, pf |
| The Headland (Text by Ursula Vaughan Williams) | 2008 | Choral and vocal Mezzo soprano, piano |

=== Other ===
List of completions, arrangements and orchestrations by Anthony Payne
| Title | Year | Type | Genre |
|---|---|---|---|
| Fresh Dances for the Late Tchaikovsky | 1993 | Arrangements | Orchestral (ballet); 2 vn, 2 va, 2 vc, piano 4 hands |
| Edward Elgar: Symphony No. 3 | 1993–1997 | Completion | Orchestral |
| Gerald Finzi: "Proud Songsters"; From Earth and Air and Rain | 2000 | Orchestration | Orchestral |
| Frederick Delius: "Hidden Love"; From Seven Songs from the Norwegian | 2000 | Orchestration | Orchestral |
| Edward Elgar: So Many True Princesses | 2002 | Orchestration | Orchestral |
| Edward Elgar: Pomp and Circumstance March No. 6 | 2005 | Completion | Orchestral |
| Edward Elgar: The Crown of India | 2007–2008 | Orchestration | Orchestral |
| Vaughan Williams: Four Last Songs | 2013 | Orchestration | Orchestral |

== Selected publications ==
Alongside his career as a composer, Payne simultaneously built up a reputation as a writer on music, writing books about Arnold Schoenberg and Frank Bridge. He also became a renowned critic, regularly writing for The Daily Telegraph, The Independent and Country Life. Other writing contributions include articles in Tempo, Musical Times and Music and Musicians.

Books

- Payne, Anthony (1968). Schoenberg. Oxford Studies of Composers. London: Oxford University Press. OCLC 915854222.
- ——; Foreman, Lewis; Bishop, John (1976). The Music of Frank Bridge. London: Thames Publishing. ISBN 978-0-905210-02-5.
- —— (1984). Frank Bridge: Radical and Conservative. London: Thames Publishing. ISBN 978-0-905210-25-4.
- —— (1998). Elgar's Third Symphony: The Story of the Reconstruction. London: Faber and Faber. ISBN 978-0-571-19538-1. OCLC 247161355.

Articles

- Payne, Anthony (Winter 1961–1962). "Delius's Stylistic Development". Tempo (60). Cambridge University Press: 6–16+23–25. doi:10.1017/S0040298200055662. JSTOR 943269. S2CID 145521419.
- —— (Autumn–Winter 1963). "Dramatic Use of Tonality in 'Peter Grimes'". Tempo (66–67). Cambridge University Press: 22–26. doi:10.1017/S0040298200036317. JSTOR 943322. S2CID 146426517.
- —— (April 1964). "Alan Bush". The Musical Times. 105 (1454). Musical Times Publications Ltd.: 263–265. doi:10.2307/949357. JSTOR 949357.
- —— (Autumn 1964). "Stravinsky's 'The Flood'". Tempo (70). Cambridge University Press: 2–8. JSTOR 943932.
- —— (Spring 1964). "The Music of Nicholas Maw". Tempo (68). Cambridge University Press: 2–13. JSTOR 943548.
- —— (Winter 1964–1965). "Nicholas Maw's 'One Man Show'". Tempo (71). Cambridge University Press: 2–14. doi:10.1017/S0040298200033155. JSTOR 943084. S2CID 143535551.
- —— (Spring 1965). "Peter Maxwell Davies's Five Motets". Tempo (72). Cambridge University Press: 7–11. doi:10.1017/S0040298200033337. JSTOR 943722. S2CID 145764346.
- —— (Summer 1965). "Stravinsky's 'Abraham and Isaac' and 'Elegy for J. F. K.'". Tempo (73). Cambridge University Press: 12–15. doi:10.1017/S0040298200033520. JSTOR 942857. S2CID 145010719.
- —— (Autumn 1965). "Prokofiev's 'The Fiery Angel'". Tempo (74). Cambridge University Press: 21–23. JSTOR 944363.
- —— (Autumn 1965). "Nicholas Maw's String Quartet". Tempo (74). Cambridge University Press: 5–11. doi:10.1017/S0040298200036718. JSTOR 944360. S2CID 145680508.
- —— (Spring 1966). "Delius's Requiem". Tempo (76). Cambridge University Press: 12–17. doi:10.1017/S0040298200033933. JSTOR 942940. S2CID 145431230.
- —— (Summer 1967). "Requiem Canticles". Tempo (81). Cambridge University Press: 10–19. doi:10.1017/S004029820003446X. JSTOR 943881. S2CID 251415624.
- —— (Autumn 1968). "Tavener's 'In Alium' and Gerhard's Epithalamion". Tempo (86). Cambridge University Press: 19+21–22. JSTOR 944199.
- —— (April 1971). "Justin Connolly". The Musical Times. 112 (1538). Musical Times Publications Ltd.: 335–337. doi:10.2307/955896. JSTOR 955896.
- —— (August 1971). "Peter Dickinson". The Musical Times. 112 (1542). Musical Times Publications Ltd.: 755–756. doi:10.2307/954597. JSTOR 954597.
- —— (August 1973). "Review: Bax at Length". The Musical Times. 114 (1566). Musical Times Publications Ltd.: 798. doi:10.2307/957574. JSTOR 957574.
- —— (September 1973). "The Music of Frank Bridge: The Early Years". Tempo (106). Cambridge University Press: 18–25. doi:10.1017/S0040298200057788. JSTOR 943018. S2CID 146409779.
- —— (December 1973). "The Music of Frank Bridge: The Last Years". Tempo (107). Cambridge University Press: 11–18. doi:10.1017/S0040298200057971. JSTOR 944268. S2CID 144377032.
- —— (September 1984). "Bax: A Centenary Assessment". Tempo (150). Cambridge University Press: 29–32. JSTOR 946079.
- —— (1986). "Englands zweite Renaissance in der Musik" [England's second renaissance in music]. Österreichische Musikzeitschrift (in German). 41 (3–4): 149–154. doi:10.7767/omz.1986.41.34.149. S2CID 163613817.
- —— (December 1987). "Britten and the String Quartet". Tempo (163). Cambridge University Press: 2–4+6. doi:10.1017/S0040298200023548. JSTOR 945685. S2CID 145266557.
- —— (April 1998). "Being Elgar". Tempo (204). Cambridge University Press: 2–3. doi:10.1017/S0040298200006239. JSTOR 944898. S2CID 251411714.
- ——; Hindmarsh, Paul; Foreman, Lewis (2001). "Bridge, Frank". Grove Music Online. Oxford: Oxford University Press. doi:10.1093/gmo/9781561592630.article.48240. ISBN 978-1-56159-263-0. (subscription, Wikilibrary access, or UK public library membership required) (Note: Grove notes that Payne, Hindmarsh & Foreman (2001) has been superseded by Huss, Fabian (2001). "Bridge, Frank". Grove Music Online. Oxford: Oxford University Press. doi:10.1093/gmo/9781561592630.article.90000361257. ISBN 9781561592630. (subscription, Wikilibrary access, or UK public library membership required))
- ——; Anderson, Robert; Carley, Lionel (2001). "Delius, Frederick". Grove Music Online. Oxford: Oxford University Press. doi:10.1093/gmo/9781561592630.article.49095. ISBN 978-1-56159-263-0.(subscription, Wikilibrary access, or UK public library membership required)
- —— (2001). "Society for the Promotion of New Music". Grove Music Online. Oxford: Oxford University Press. doi:10.1093/gmo/9781561592630.article.26075. ISBN 978-1-56159-263-0. (subscription, Wikilibrary access, or UK public library membership required)
- ——; Calam, Toni (2001). "Lutyens, (Agnes) Elisabeth". Grove Music Online. Oxford: Oxford University Press. doi:10.1093/gmo/9781561592630.article.17227. ISBN 978-1-56159-263-0. (subscription, Wikilibrary access, or UK public library membership required)
- ——; Kemp, Ian; Neighbour, Oliver; Miller, Karl; Wood, Hugh; Matthews, David; Maconie, Robin; Goehr, Alexander (April 2010). "David Drew: Tributes & Memories". Tempo. 64 (252): 14–20. doi:10.1017/S0040298210000136. JSTOR 40794440.

== Awards and honours ==
- Radcliffe Award, 1975, for First Sight of Her and After
- Listeners' award in the first Radio 3 British Composer Awards of The Ivors Academy, 2003, for Visions and Journeys
- Honorary Doctor of Music (with Manning), University of Durham, 2007
- British Composer Awards Winners: Chamber of The Ivors Academy, 2011, for String Quartet No. 2
- Elgar Medal of the Elgar Society, 2011
- Honorary Doctor of Music, Kingston University
- Honorary Doctor of Music, University of Birmingham
- Fellow of the Royal College of Music; arts research fellow for two years
