= Jane Manning =

British soprano (1938–2021)

Jane Manning OBE
- Born: Jane Marian Manning; 20 September 1938; Norwich, UK
- Died: 31 March 2021 (aged 82)
- Education: Royal Academy of Music; Scuola di Canto, Cureglia
- Occupations: Soprano; Writer; Academic teacher
- Organizations: Jane's Minstrels; Guildhall School of Music & Drama; Royal College of Music
- Known for: Contemporary classical music
- Spouse: Anthony Payne

Jane Marian Manning OBE (20 September 1938 – 31 March 2021) was an English concert and opera soprano, writer on music, and visiting professor at Guildhall School of Music & Drama and the Royal College of Music. A specialist in contemporary classical music, she was described by one critic as "the irrepressible, incomparable, unstoppable Ms. Manning – life and soul of British contemporary music".

Manning and her husband, the composer Anthony Payne were avid supporters of contemporary British music. They founded the virtuoso new music group Jane's Minstrels and many of Payne's works were premiered by Manning and the ensemble.

== Early life ==
Manning was born in Norwich on 20 September 1938 to Gerald Manville Manning and Lily Manning (née Thompson). She was educated at Norwich High School for Girls, the Royal Academy of Music (graduating LRAM in 1958), and the Scuola di Canto at Cureglia, Switzerland. She was promoted to ARCM in 1962. She described her musical upbringing as one of a "very traditional background in oratorio and Gilbert & Sullivan".

== Career ==
Manning's London debut came in 1964, at a Park Lane Group concert together with her mentor Susan Bradshaw. She gave her first BBC broadcast the following year, singing Schoenberg's Pierrot lunaire. She first sang at a Henry Wood Promenade Concert in 1972, and was part of The Matrix with Alan Hacker. She co-founded her own virtuoso ensemble, called Jane's Minstrels, in 1988, together with her husband. The group played music by Henry Purcell, Edward Elgar, Frank Bridge, Percy Grainger, Anton Webern and Arnold Schoenberg.

Manning specialised in contemporary classical music. Her voice and sense of pitch made her a leading performer of new music. She was noted as a performer of Schoenberg's Pierrot lunaire. She sang regularly in concert halls and festivals throughout Europe, with more than three hundred world premières given. She toured Australia and New Zealand in 1978, 1980, 1982, 1984, 1986, 1990, 1996, 2000 and 2002, and the United States in 1981, 1983, 1985, 1986, 1987, 1988, 1989, 1991, 1993, 1996 and 1997. She was the author of a textbook, New Vocal Repertory in two volumes. A follow-up, Vocal Repertoire for the 21st Century, was published in 2020. Volume 1 covers works from the second half of the 20th century, Volume 2, works written from 2000 onwards.

In his preface to Manning's 65th birthday concert at Wigmore Hall in 2003, the British critic Bayan Northcott wrote:

It was an inspired choice to present Jane Manning as Miss Donnithorne, not only because she is an artist of astonishing gift but because she is also one of the greatest performers of Schoenberg's Pierrot Lunaire, and in her performance of the Maxwell Davies, the two pieces are palpably linked.... Her performance is desperately touching, the more disturbing for being played as reminiscence.... a performance of scorching intensity (without conductor).

Several leading composers composed new works for Manning including Harrison Birtwistle, Naresh Sohal, James MacMillan and Colin Matthews. She commissioned the opera King Harald's Saga from Judith Weir in 1979. Richard Rodney Bennett's choral work Spells was written for her, as was Matthew King's The Snow Queen (1992).

The critic Ivan Hewett wrote of Manning:

For many people Jane Manning is simply the voice of contemporary classical music in this country. Anyone who took an interest in this burgeoning area of music in the 1970s and '80s grew up with the sound of her astonishing voice in their ears. It's instantly recognisable, but it’s also a chameleon. Whether she's faced with the pure angular leaps of Anton Webern, the throaty suggestiveness of Schoenberg or the black, crazed humour of György Ligeti, Jane Manning is always equal to the task.

Her world premieres include the role of Max in Oliver Knussen's Where the Wild Things Are (1980), Kavita I, II and III (1970/72) by Naresh Sohal, and Night's Poet (1971) by the same composer. Judith Weir created a one-woman opera for her, King Harald's Saga, premiered in 1979. She was awarded an honorary doctorate in 2007 (along with her husband Anthony Payne) by Durham University. This marked the first time the university honoured a married couple in this manner.

== Personal life ==
Manning married the composer Anthony Payne in 1966. He composed his first piece for her one decade later, titled The World's Winter. She subsequently sang it at the Cheltenham Festival in 1976, with the Nash Ensemble. She did not use her married name professionally.

Manning died on 31 March 2021, at the age of 82. A month later, Payne died; his health was reportedly affected by Manning's death. Payne's colleague and fellow composer Colin Matthews noted that "They were inseparable in life, and I suppose it's not a surprise that he would follow her so soon after". Payne and Manning had no children, but were survived by a nephew and two nieces.

== Appointments ==
- Member of International Jury, Gaudeamus Young Interpreters Competition, Holland, 1976, 1979, and 1987
- Milhaud Visiting Professor, Mills College, Oakland, 1983
- Lucie Stern Visiting Professor, Mills College, Oakland, 1981 and 1986
- Vice-President, Society for the Promotion of New Music, 1984–
- Member of Jury, European Youth Competition for Composers, 1985
- Member of Executive Committee of Musicians Benevolent Fund, 1989–
- Chairman, Eye Music Trust (formerly Nettlefold Festival Trust), 1990–
- Member of Arts Council England Music Panel, 1990–95
- Visiting Artist, University of Manitoba, 1992
- Visiting Professor, Royal College of Music, 1995–
- Honorary Professor, Keele University, 1996–2002
- AHRC Creative Arts Research Fellow, 2004–07, and Visiting Professor, 2007–2009, Kingston University

== Publications ==
- chapter in How Music Works (1981)
- New Vocal Repertory (Vol. I, 1986, and Vol. II, 1998, Oxford University Press)
- chapter in A Messiaen Companion (1996)
- Pierrot Lunaire: practicalities and perspectives (Southern Voices, 2008)
- chapter in Cambridge History of Musical Performance (2009, Cambridge University Press)
- Vocal Repertoire for the 21st Century, vols. 1 & 2 (2020, Oxford University Press)
- many articles in Composer, Music and Musicians, and Tempo

== Honours ==
- Hon. Associate of the Royal Academy of Music (ARAM) 1972
- Special Award, Composers Guild of Great Britain, 1973
- Portrait acquired by the National Portrait Gallery, London, 1977
- Hon. Fellow of the Royal Academy of Music (FRAM) 1984
- Officer of the Order of the British Empire, 1990
- Fellow of the Royal College of Music, 1998
- Hon doctorate, University of York, 1988
- Hon. Doctor of Music, University of Keele, 2004
- Hon. Doctor of Music (with Payne), University of Durham, 2007
- Gold Badge Award, BASCA, 2013
