= Four Last Songs (Vaughan Williams) =

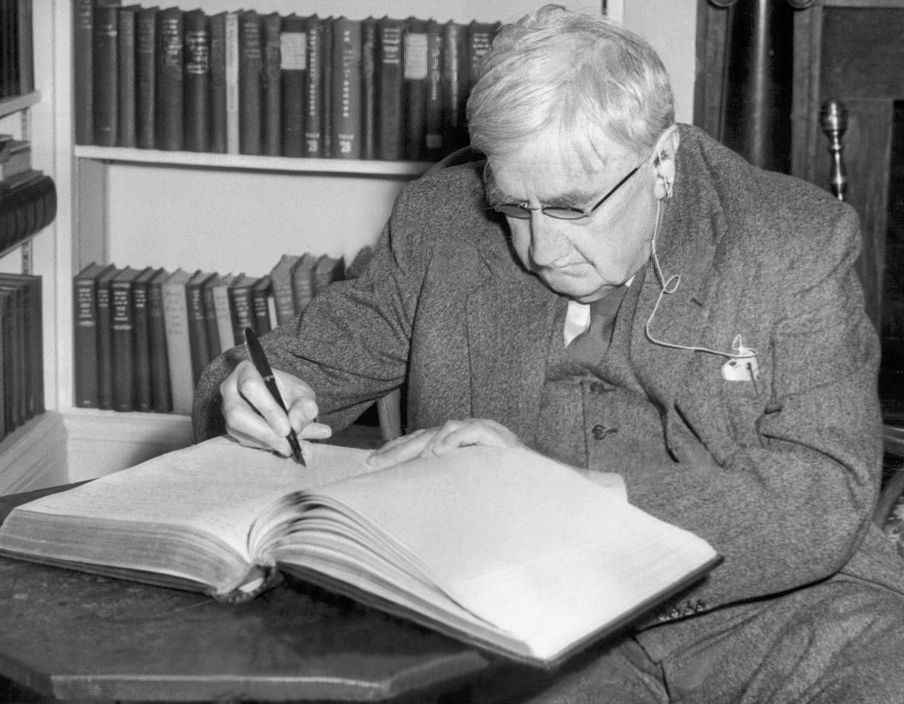
Ralph Vaughan Williams signing the guest book at Yale University in 1954

Ralph Vaughan Williams' Four Last Songs cycle is made up of four songs:

1. Procris
2. Tired
3. Hands, Eyes, and Heart
4. Menelaus

All of the songs were composed between 1954 and 1958. The cycle is best suited for mezzo-soprano, although, the original program note from the cycle's 1959 premiere acknowledges that all of the songs may be sung by a baritone, except for "Hands, Eyes, and Heart", "which is a woman's song."

It is suggested that the four songs were originally intended to be two separate song cycles with "Menelaus" and "Procris" belonging to one cycle and "Tired" and "Hands, Eyes, and Heart" belonging to another. However, there is debate in the scholarly community about this proposed song cycle grouping. Renée Chérie Clark in her essay, "A Critical Appraisal of Four Last Songs" suggests, citing a letter from the composer to a friend at Cornell University, that Vaughan Williams actually intended for "Menelaus" and "Hands, Eyes, and Heart" to be grouped together. The composer's death in 1958 left both cycles unfinished, and in 1960, they were assembled by the composer's widow, Ursula Vaughan Williams, and published as set by Oxford University Press.

The texts of all four songs are poems written by Vaughan Williams' wife Ursula who penned several books of poetry throughout her lifetime as well as a biography of her late husband. "Procris" and "Menelaus" deal with figures from ancient Greek and Roman mythology and epic poetry while "Tired" and "Hands, Eyes, and Heart" depict images of love between a husband and wife.

== Songs ==
=== 1. Procris ===
Piero di Cosimo's painting A Satyr Mourning Over a Nymph or The Death of Procris stirred Ursula Vaughan Williams to write her poem "Procris." In ancient mythology, Procris, suspecting her husband Cephalus of having a secret lover, sneaks up on him while he hunts in the woods. Startled by noises behind him, he turns and shoots Procris with his bow. The song is written in a duple meter (6/8) and contains many shifts in tonality. While written in the key of G Major, the two beginning eleven-note descending motifs are more reminiscent of a G minor scale. The song also contains many hemiola rhythms and chromaticisms.

=== 2. Tired ===
Textually, as well as musically, "Tired" and "Hands, Eyes, and Heart" are the most closely related of the set. Both texts describe a state of self-abandonment in favour of a life devoted to another. "Tired" can be divided into an ABA format consisting of a refrain in B♭ minor with a verse section in the dominant minor, F minor. In the A section of "Tired" the singer implores her lover to "Sleep, and I'll be still as another sleeper, holding you in my arms." The singer is content to simply be lying near her beloved "at last". In the F-minor section, emotion builds as the speaker describes how the "sheltering midnight" is the only place where they can be alone together where "no passion or despair or hope" can separate the two from each other. At the return of the A section, we return to B♭ minor, and the speaker states the things that she will remember about her beloved "as the fire fell to ashes, and the minutes passed." While the song is entitled "Tired", there is little sleeping going on within the piece as the bass line moves up a fourth and down a fourth, churning the song onward, and the lyrics show little intention of the speaker ever going to sleep.

=== 3. Hands, Eyes, and Heart ===
"Hands, Eyes, and Heart" begins in C minor and ends in the relative major of E♭ major. The text is a list of commands. The speaker implores her hands to "give him all the measure of my love", her eyes to "be deep pools of truth", and her heart to "in his keeping, be at rest and live". Thus, the musical structure begins with a simple melody we can call A, then elaborates on it in the next command (A′), and next elaborates on the melody further (A″), and finally concludes on an E♭ major chord.

=== 4. Menelaus ===
One day, after Vaughan Williams and his wife had been reading from T. E. Lawrence's translation of Homer's The Odyssey, Ursula felt compelled to write some verse. The resulting poem and song became the fourth song of the cycle "Menelaus." The character Menelaus appears both in Homer's The Iliad and The Odyssey. Menelaus is the King of Sparta whose wife, Helen, was taken from him by Paris to Troy. Together with his brother Agamemnon, fellow ruler Odysseus, and other warriors, Menelaus launched the Trojan War to regain his wife and return her to Sparta. In The Odyssey, Odysseus' son Telemachus visits Menelaus in attempts to obtain news of his father who has not yet returned from the war. The Vaughan Williams' drew inspiration from Menelaus' description to Telemachus of the things Odysseus must do to return home. This is evident in the text of the song in which the phrase "you will come home" returns both as a lyrical and musical refrain.

"Menelaus" is similar to "Procris" in that they both contain many hemiola rhythms and a wavering tonal center. "Menelaus" is written in triple meter, but contains many metric changes throughout the piece usually going back and forth between triple and duple meter. The opening measure contains three groups of descending and ascending 32nd notes that suggest the playing of a harp or lyre, which evokes an image of ancient story telling and music-making. This pattern repeats wherever the words "you will come home" occur as well as the statement, "stretch out your hand" creating a short, refrain-like section.

== Orchestration ==
In 2013, Anthony Payne orchestrated all four of the songs; the work premiered on 4 September 2013 for the BBC Proms with Osmo Vänskä conducting, soprano Ruby Hughes and mezzo-soprano Jennifer Johnston.

== Sources ==
- Vaughan Williams Collected Songs in Three Volumes: Vol. 1 Oxford University Press, Great Britain. 1993.
- Adams, Byron and Robin Wells, eds. Vaughan Williams Essays Ashgate Publishing, Ltd, 2003. pp. 157–171.
- The Musical Times, Vol. 102, No. 1416. (Feb. 1961), pp. 104–105.
- 'Ralph Vaughan Williams', Grove Music Online ed. L. Macy (Accessed 12 February 2008), <http://www.grovemusic.com >
