= Michael Dussek =

English pianist

Michael Dussek (born 24 February 1958) is an English pianist specialising in chamber music and song accompaniment.

== Education ==
Dussek was educated at St John's College School, Cambridge and Radley College, where his piano teacher was Hugo Langrish. He studied at London's Royal Academy of Music with Alexander Kelly, Rex Stephens and John Streets. Dussek subsequently received private tuition from Greville Rothon and Geoffrey Parsons.

== Biography ==
Dussek made his Wigmore Hall debut in London in 1980. From 1979 until 1999, he was a regular recital partner to cellist Ofra Harnoy, performing in Europe, North America and Asia. Their RCA recording of sonatas by Schubert and Prokofiev won a Canadian Juno Award for Best Classical Album in 1989. During this period he also performed internationally with violinists Cho-Liang Lin, Anne Akiko Meyers, Kurt Nikkanen, Xue Wei and Antje Weithaas.

Since 2002, Dussek has performed extensively with violinist Ryu Goto, including major recital tours of Japan and recitals in Carnegie Hall. Their recordings for Deutsche Grammophon include a live recital from Tokyo's Suntory Hall in 2006. Singers he has accompanied include Charles Daniels, Bernarda Fink, Stephan Loges, Christopher Maltman, Ian Partridge, Joan Rodgers and Vassily Savenko.

Dussek is a member of three chamber ensembles: the Dussek Piano Trio, Endymion and Primavera, performing in most of the UK's major concert venues. He has also collaborated with the Bridge, Chillingirian, Coull, Dante and Wihan string quartets.

Dussek's discography includes more than 20 CDs in Dutton Epoch's collection of recordings featuring neglected British composers. His recording of Edmund Rubbra's Violin Sonatas with Krysia Osostowicz was nominated for a Gramophone Award. His performance of York Bowen's First Piano Concerto with the BBC Concert Orchestra under Vernon Handley was selected for Fanfare Magazine's Hall of Fame.

== Select discography ==
- York Bowen Piano Concertos 1–3; BBC Concert Orchestra, Vernon Handley. (Dutton Epoch)
- Bax Songs with Ian Partridge and Jean Rigby (Dutton Epoch)
- Rubbra Violin Sonatas with Krysia Osostowicz (Dutton Epoch)
- Rubbra Solo Piano Music (Dutton Epoch)
- Rubbra Cello Sonata with Pierre Doumange (Dutton Epoch)
- Nielsen Solo Piano Music, Chamber Music with New London Chamber Ensemble (Meridian)
- Britten Solo Piano Music, Music for Oboe and Piano with Sarah Francis. (Hyperion)
- Violin Recital 2006, live from Tokyo's Suntory Hall, sonatas by Brahms, Strauss etc. with Ryu Goto (Deutsche Grammophon)
- Beethoven Kreutzer Sonata, Franck Sonata etc. with Ryu Goto (Deutsche Grammophon)
- Paganiniana: Violin Sonatas by Beethoven, Saint-Saens etc. with Ryu Goto (Deutsche Grammophon)
- Brahms Piano Trios, Horn Trio, Dussek Piano Trio, Stephen Stirling (Meridian)
- Haydn Piano Trios, Dussek Piano Trio (Meridian)
- Bridge Piano Trios, Dussek Piano Trio (Meridian)
- Arensky Piano Trios, Dussek Piano Trio (Meridian)
- Norman O'Neill Chamber Music with Bridge String Quartet (EMR)
- York Bowen Chamber Music, Endymion (Dutton Epoch)
- Rubbra Chamber Music, Endymion (Dutton Epoch)
- Romantic Revolution, Dussek, Chopin, Volume I (Somm)
- Romantic Revolution, Dussek, Chopin, Volume II (Somm)
- Those Blue Remembered Hills, Gurney, Howells, Bridge Quartet and Roderick Williams (EMR)

== Teaching ==
Dussek is Geoffrey Parsons Professor of Ensemble Piano at the Royal Academy of Music having previously been Head of Piano Accompaniment.

Dussek has given masterclasses at the Central Conservatory of Music in Beijing, Berlin's Berlin University of the Arts, Hochschule für Musik, Theater und Medien Hannover in Hanover, London's Royal College of Music, the Saint Petersburg Conservatory in Russia, Weimar's Franz Liszt Academy and the Britten–Pears School for Advanced Musical Studies in Aldeburgh.
