= General Locke =

General Locke may refer to:

- Matthew Locke (North Carolina politician) (1730–1801), North Carolina Militia general in the American Revolutionary War
- William Locke (general) (1894–1962), Australian Army major general

== See also ==
- Robert Lock (British Army officer) (1879–1957), British Army major general
- General Loch (disambiguation)
