= Oliver Neighbour =

British musicologist and librarian (1923–2015)

Oliver Wray Neighbour, FBA (1 April 1923 – 20 January 2015) was a British musicologist and bibliographer. Along with Thurston Dart, Nigel Fortune and Stanley Sadie he was one of Britain's leading musicologists of the post-World War II generation.

== Life and career ==
Born in Merstham, Surrey, on 1 April 1923, Neighbour studied at Birkbeck College, receiving a Bachelor of Arts in 1950 on modern languages. He later became music librarian of the British Museum from 1976 to 1985, succeeding Alexander Hyatt King.

His main fields of research were 19th-century English music, as well as composers William Byrd and Arnold Schoenberg.

== Selected writings ==
- Neighbour, Oliver; Jeans, Susi (2001). "Bull [Boul, Bul, Bol], John". Grove Music Online. Oxford: Oxford University Press. doi:10.1093/gmo/9781561592630.article.04294. ISBN 978-1-56159-263-0. (subscription, Wikilibrary access, or UK public library membership required)
- —— (August 2008). "Ralph, Adeline, and Ursula Vaughan Williams: Some Facts and Speculation". Music & Letters. 89 (3): 337–345. doi:10.1093/ml/gcn042. JSTOR 30162996. (subscription required)
- ——; Kemp, Ian; Goehr, Alexander; Miller, Karl; Wood, Hugh; Matthews, David; Maconie, Robin; Payne, Anthony (April 2010). "David Drew: Tributes & Memories". Tempo. 64 (252): 14–20. JSTOR 40794440.
