= Bayan Northcott =

British music critic and composer (1940–2022)

Bayan Peter Northcott (24 April 1940 – 13 December 2022) was an English music critic and composer.

== Biography ==
Born in Harrow on the Hill, London to Roy and Cecilia Northcott (née Venning) on 24 April 1940 he was educated at Latymer Upper School in Hammersmith. Northcott read English at Oxford University and received a Bachelor of Arts degree from Oxford in 1962. He then taught English from 1964 to 1970 at Chichester High School For Boys. Northcott developed an interest in composition and was encouraged by Alexander Goehr and Hans Keller. Subsequently he read music at the University of Southampton, where his instructors included Goehr and Jonathan Harvey. Northcott earned a BMus degree from Southampton in 1971. He mentored other composers such as Robin Holloway and Julian Anderson.

Northcott served as a music critic for the New Statesman, for The Sunday Telegraph from 1976 to 1986, and he was chief music critic of The Independent from 1986 to 2009, where he worked alongside Anthony Payne and Tess Knighton. He also wrote on music for Tempo and BBC Music Magazine. He was a director of the independent recording company NMC.

He died in London on 13 December 2022, aged 82.

=== Compositions ===
As a composer, Northcott's output was modest and mainly scored for small forces. Notable chamber works include the Oboe Sonata (1978), Guitar Fantasia (1982) and the Piano Sextet (1985, premiered by the Fires of London). Choral pieces include Hymn to Cybele (1983, performed at the 2010 Proms), the Four Votive Antiphons, Op. 7 (2003, a cumulative cycle), and Canticle: The Doubting of Thomas (2007).

But there were also orchestral works. The Horn Concerto, which took eight years to complete, was first performed in 1998 by Speculum Musicae in New York, and subsequently by the London Sinfonietta. His Concerto for Orchestra, a 17 minute symphonic piece in one movement, was performed at the Proms in 2016.

== List of compositions ==
- Sonata for Solo Oboe, Op. 1 (1977–78)
- Six Japanese Lyrics, Op. 2, for Sop, cl, vn (1971/79) (texts translated by the composer)
- Fantasia for Guitar, Op. 3 (1981–82)
- Hymn to Cybele, Op. 4, for Mezz, Ten, Bar, chor, 2 perc, db (1983) (text – Catullus, translated by the composer)
- Sextet, Op. 5, for fl/picc, cl/b cl, pno, perc, vn, vc (1984–85)
- Carillon (after Machaut), for 14 players (1987)
- Three English Lyrics, Op. 6, for Sop, cl, va, db (1988) (texts – Anon, 15th–16th century)
- Of All the Instruments (after Purcell), for fl, ob, cl, glock, vn, vc, db (1994)
- Concerto for Horn and Ensemble, for 11 players, Op. 8 (1990–98)
- Memento, for Sop, fl (1999) (text – Hilda Morley)
- Four Votive Antiphons Op. 7, for Alt, 3 Ten, Bar, or chor (1997–2003)
  - "Salve Regina", Op. 7, No. 1 (1999) (text – Anon Latin)
  - "Alma Redemptoris Mater", Op. 7, No. 2 (2000) (text – Anon Latin)
  - "Ave Regina Celorum" / "Alleluia", Op. 7, No. 3 (1997) (text – Anon Latin)
  - "Regina Celi", Op. 7, No. 4 (2003) (text – Anon Latin)
- Fandango, Op. 9, for Harpsichord (2006)
- Canticle: The Doubting of Thomas, for Mezz, Ten, Bar, chor, org (2007) (text – Bible, Authorized Version)
- Poet and Star, for Sop, Ten, pno (2008) (text – Thomas Hardy)
- Doubles All Round, for fl/picc, cl/b cl, hn, pno, vn, vc (2009)
- Elegy for Solo Viola (2013)
- Concerto for Orchestra (2014–16)
- Sonata for Flute and Clarinet (2018)

== Filmography ==
- 2006 – In Search of Mozart (contributor)
- 2009 – In Search of Beethoven (contributor)
- 2012 – In Search of Haydn (contributor)

== Writing ==
=== Books ===
- 1980 – The Music of Alexander Goehr : Interviews and Articles
- 2009 – The Way we Listen Now and Other Writings on Music, ed. Christopher Wintle

=== Journalism ===
- Northcott, Bayan (January 1975). "Anthony Payne". The Musical Times. 116 (1583): 36–38. doi:10.2307/958865. JSTOR 958865.
- 'As long as the muse lives on: On Elliott Carter's 85th birthday', in The Independent, 11 December 1993
- 'Modern music and the tale of two Ms', in The Independent, 17 November 2001
