= Krysia Osostowicz =

21st-century violinist

Krysia Osostowicz FGS (born 1960) is a violin player who teaches at the Guildhall School of Music. She is the leader of the Brodsky Quartet and principal violinist with the Endymion Ensemble. She previously played for 15 years with the Domus Piano Quartet. In 2021 she joined the Brodsky Quartet.
