= Hans Keller =

Austrian-British musician and writer (1919–1985)

- Born: March 11, 1919
- Origin: Vienna, Austria
- Died: November 6, 1985
- Genre: Classical
- Years active: 1938–1985

Hans (Heinrich) Keller (11 March 1919 – 6 November 1985) was an Austrian-born British musician and writer, who made significant contributions to musicology and music criticism, as well as being a commentator on such disparate fields as psychoanalysis and football. In the late 1950s, he invented the method of "wordless functional analysis", in which a musical composition is analysed in musical sound alone, without any words being heard or read. He worked full-time for the BBC between 1959 and 1979.

== Life and career ==
Keller was born into a wealthy and culturally well-connected Jewish family in Vienna. As a boy, Keller was taught by Oskar Adler who had, decades earlier, been Arnold Schoenberg's boyhood friend and first teacher. Keller also came to know the composer and performer Franz Schmidt, but was never a formal pupil. In 1938, the Anschluss forced Keller to flee to London (where he had relatives), and, in the years that followed, he became an influential figure in the UK's musical and music-critical life. Initially active as a violinist and violist, he soon found his niche as a prolific and provocative writer on music, as well as an influential teacher, lecturer, broadcaster and coach.

An original thinker never afraid of controversy, Keller's passionate support of composers whose work he saw as under-valued or insufficiently understood made him a tireless advocate of Benjamin Britten and Arnold Schoenberg, as well as an illuminating analyst of figures such as Mozart, Haydn, Beethoven and Mendelssohn. Many of Keller's earliest articles appeared in the journals Music Review and Music Survey, the latter of which was co-edited by him after he joined the founding editor Donald Mitchell for the so-called 'New Series' (1949–52).

In later years, much of his advocacy was carried out from within the BBC, where he came to hold several senior positions and was a regular contributor to The Listener magazine. When William Glock was appointed controller of music at the BBC in 1959 one of his first acts was to recruit Keller as music talks producer.

It was at the BBC that Keller (in collaboration with Susan Bradshaw) perpetrated in 1961 the "Piotr Zak" hoax, broadcasting a deliberately nonsensical series of random noises, as a new avant-garde piece by a fictitious Polish composer. The hoax was designed to demonstrate the poor quality of critical discourse surrounding contemporary music at a problematic stage in its historical development; in this aspect, the hoax was a failure, as no critic expressed any particular enthusiasm for Piotr Zak's piece, with all published reviews being roundly dismissive of the work.

In 1967, Keller had a famous encounter with the rock group Pink Floyd on the TV show The Look of the Week in which he interviewed band members Syd Barrett and Roger Waters. Keller was generally puzzled by, or even contemptuous of, the group and its music, repeatedly returning to the criticism that they were too loud for his taste. He ended his interview segment with the band by saying: "my verdict is that it is a little bit of a regression to childhood – but, after all, why not?" This interview was released as part of Pink Floyd's 2016 box set, The Early Years 1965–1972.

Keller's gift for systematic thinking, allied to his philosophical and psycho-analytic knowledge, bore fruit in the method of "wordless functional analysis" (abbreviated by the football-loving Keller as "FA"), designed to furnish incontrovertibly audible demonstrations of a masterwork's "all-embracing background unity". This method was developed in tandem with a "Theory of Music" that explicitly considered musical structure from the point of view of listener expectations; the "meaningful contradiction" of expected "background" by unexpectable "foreground" was seen as generating a work's expressive content. An element of Keller's theory of unity was the "Principle of Reversed and Postponed Antecedents and Consequents", which has not been widely adopted. His term "homotonality", however, has proved useful to musicologists in several fields.

Keller was married to the artist Milein Cosman, whose drawings illustrated some of his work. His manuscripts (radio broadcasts and musicological writings) are kept at the Cambridge University Library.

== Dedications and awards ==
As a man prominent in the world of 'contemporary music' (even working for several years as the BBC's "Chief Assistant, New Music"), Keller had close personal and professional ties with many composers and was frequently the dedicatee of new compositions. Those who dedicated works to him include:

- Judith Bingham: Pictured Within, for piano solo (1981)
- Benjamin Britten: String Quartet No.3, Op. 94
- Benjamin Frankel: String Quartet No.5, Op.43
- Philip Grange: In Memoriam HK, for solo trombone (c.1990)
- David Matthews: Piano Trio No.1; 'To Hans Keller'
- Robert Matthew-Walker: Piano Sonata No.3 – Fantasy-Sonata: Hamlet, Op.34 (1980)
- Bayan Northcott
- Buxton Orr: Piano Trio No.1; 'In admiration and friendship'
- Robert Simpson: Symphony No.7; "To Hans and Milein Keller"
- Josef Tal: Double Concerto for Two Pianos and Orchestra; "To Hans and Milein Keller".

Homage to Hans Keller (1982) by Anthony Burgess is perhaps a special case. Written immediately after Keller reviewed the operetta Blooms of Dublin as a "pathetic pastiche", Burgess scored the piece for four tubas. Roger Lewis describes it as "a kind of lavatorial blast".

In December 1979, Keller received the "Special Award" of the Composers' Guild of Great Britain. In September 1985, just weeks before his death from motor neurone disease, he received from the President of Austria the Ehrenkreuz für Wissenschaft und Kunst, 1 Klasse ("Cross of Honour for Arts and Sciences, 1st Class").

== Writings ==
- 'Film Music', Sight and Sound, no.60 (1946–7), 136; no.62 (1947), 63–4; no.64 (1947–8), 168–9; MR, x (1949), 50–51, 138, 225–6, 303; xi (1950), 52–3; Music Survey, i (1949), 196–7; ii (1949–50), 25–7, 101–2, 188–9, 250–51; iii (1950–51), 42–3; MT, xcvi (1955), 265–6
- Benjamin Britten: Albert Herring (London, 1947)
- Benjamin Britten: The Rape of Lucretia (London, 1947)
- The Need for Competent Film Music Criticism (London, 1947)
- 'Britten and Mozart: a Challenge in the Form of Variations on an Unfamiliar Theme', ML, xxix (1948), 17–30; unauthorized Ger. trans., ÖMz, v (1950), 138–47
- 'The Beggar's Opera', Tempo, no.10 (1948–9), 7–13
- 'Resistances to Britten's Music: their Psychology', Music Survey, ii (1949–50), 227–36
- 'Arthur Benjamin and the Problem of Popularity', Tempo, no.15 (1950), 4–15
- 'Schoenberg and the Men of the Press', Music Survey, iii (1950–51), 160–68
- 'Is Opera Really Necessary?', Opera, ii (1951), 337–45, 402–9
- ed., with D. Mitchell: Benjamin Britten: a Commentary on his Works from a Group of Specialists (London, 1952) [incl. 'Peter Grimes: the Story, the Music not Excluded', 111–31; 'The Musical Character', 319–51]
- 'The Idomeneo Gavotte's Vicissitude', MR, xiv (1953), 155–7
- 'Film Music: British', Grove5
- 'National Frontiers in Music', Tempo, no.33 (1954), 23–30
- 'First Performances: Dodecaphoneys', MR, xvi (1955), 323–9
- 'First Performances: their Pre- and Reviews', MR, xvi (1955), 141–7
- 'Strict Serial Technique in Classical Music', Tempo, no.37 (1955), 12–24
- 'The Chamber Music', The Mozart Companion, ed. H.C.R. Landon and D. Mitchell (London, 1956), 90–137
- 'The Entführung's "Vaudeville"', MR, xvii (1956), 304–13
- 'Key Characteristics', Tempo, no.40 (1956), 5–16
- 'KV503: the Unity of Contrasting Themes and Movements', MR, xvii (1956), 48–58, 120–29
- 'The New in Review', MR, xvii (1956), 94–5, 153–4, 251–3, 332–6; xviii (1957), 48–51, 150–53, 221–4; xix (1958), 52–4, 137–41, 226–8, 319–22; xx (1959), 71–2, 159–62, 289–99; xxi (1960), 79–80; xxii (1961), 51–2
- 'Serial Octave Transpositions', MMR, lxxxvi (1956), 139–43, 172–7
- 'A Slip of Mozart's: its Analytical Significance', Tempo, no.42 (1956–7), 12–15
- 'Elgar the Progressive', MR, xviii (1957), 294–9
- 'Functional Analysis: its Pure Appreciation', MR, xviii (1957), 202–6; xix (1958), 192–200; see also MR, xxi (1960), 73–6, 237–9
- 'Rhythm: Gershwin and Stravinsky', The Score, no.20 (1957), 19–31
- 'Schoenberg's "Moses and Aron"', The Score, no.21 (1957), 30–45
- 'Knowing Things Backwards', Tempo, no.46 (1958), 14–20
- 'Principles of Composition', The Score, no.26 (1960), 35–45; no.27 (1960), 9–21
- 'New Music: Beethoven's Choral Fantasy', The Score, no.28 (1961), 38–47
- 'Whose Fault is the Speaking Voice?', Tempo, no.75 (1965–6), 12–17
- 'Wolfgang Amadeus Mozart', 'Peter Ilyich Tchaikovsky', The Symphony, i, ed. R. Simpson (Harmondsworth, 1966–7), 50–103, 342–53
- 'The Contemporary Problem', Tempo, no.82 (1967), 29; no.83 (1967–8), 24–5; no.84 (1968), 25–6; no.85 (1968), 30–33; no.86 (1968), 26–7; no.87 (1968–9), 76–9; no.88 (1969), 56–7; no.89 (1969), 25, 27–8; no.91 (1969–70), 34–6
- 'Towards a Theory of Music', The Listener (11 June 1970)
- 'Shostakovich's Twelfth Quartet', Tempo, no.94 (1970), 6–15
- 'Closer Towards a Theory of Music', The Listener (18 Feb 1971)
- 'Music and Psychopathology', History of Medicine, iii/2 (1971), 3–7
- 'Mozart's Wrong Key Signature', Tempo, no.98 (1972), 21–7
- 'Schoenberg: the Future of Symphonic Thought', PNM, xiii/1 (1974–5), 3–20
- 'Music 1975’, New Review, no.24 (1976), 17–53
- 'The Classical Romantics: Schumann and Mendelssohn', Of German Music: a Symposium, ed. H.-H. Schönzeler (London and New York, 1976), 179–218
- 'Description, Analysis and Criticism: a Differential Diagnosis', Soundings [Cardiff], vi (1977), 108–20
- 'My Family, You and I', New Review, nos.34–5 (1977), 13–23
- 1975 (1984 minus 9) (London, 1977)
- 'The State of the Symphony: not only Maxwell Davies', Tempo, no.125 (1978), 6–11
- 'Operatic Music and Britten', The Operas of Benjamin Britten, ed. D. Herbert (London, 1979), xiii–xxxi
- 'Schoenberg's Return to Tonality', Journal of the Arnold Schoenberg Institute, v/1 (1981), 2–21
- 'Epilogue/Prologue: Criticism and Analysis', MAn, i (1982), 9–31
- (with M. Cosman): Stravinsky Seen and Heard (London, 1982)
- 'Goethe and the Lied', Goethe Revisited: a Collection of Essays, ed. E.M. Wilkinson (London, 1984), 73–84
- 'The Musician as Librettist', Opera, xxxv (1984), 1095–9
- 'Personal Recollections: Oskar Adler's and My Own', in H. Truscott: The Music Forum of Franz Schmidt, i: The Orchestral Music (London, 1984), 7–17
- 'Whose Authenticity?', EMc, xii (1984), 517–19
- 'Functional Analysis of Mozart's G minor Quintet', MAn, iv (1985), 73–94
- The Great Haydn Quartets: Their Interpretation (London, 1986)
- Criticism (London, 1987)
- C. Wintle, ed.: Essays on Music (Cambridge, 1994)
- C. Wintle, ed.: Three Psychoanalytic Notes on Peter Grimes (1946) (London, 1995)

== Bibliography ==
- Hans Keller and Donald Mitchell (Contrs & Eds): Benjamin Britten – A Commentary on His Works from a Group of Specialists (ISBN 0-8371-5623-8).
- Hans Keller and Milein Cosman: Stravinsky Seen and Heard (Toccata Press; ISBN 0-907689-02-7).
- Hans Keller (Ed. Julian Hogg): Criticism 1987 (ISBN 0-571-14802-6).
- Hans Keller: Music, Closed Societies and Football 1986 (ISBN 0-907689-21-3)
- Hans Keller: The Great Haydn Quartets – Their Interpretation (OUP; ISBN 0-460-86107-7).
- Hans Keller (Ed. Christopher Wintle): Hans Keller – Essays on Music (ISBN 0-521-67348-8).
- Hans Keller (Ed. Christopher Wintle): Music and Psychology – From Vienna to London (1939–1952) (ISBN 0-9540123-2-1).
- Hans Keller (Ed. Gerold W. Gruber): Functional Analysis: the Unity of Contrasting Themes: Complete Edition of the Analytical Scores (Lang 2001; ISBN 3-631-36059-2).
- A. M. Garnham, Hans Keller and the BBC: the musical conscience of British broadcasting, 1959–79 (Ashgate 2003; ISBN 0-7546-0897-2).
- A. M. Garnham, Hans Keller and Internment: The Development of an Emigré Musician 1938–48 (Plumbago 2011; ISBN 978-0-9556087-8-0).
- Alison Garnham and Susi Woodhouse, Hans Keller 1919-1985: A musician in dialogue with his times (Routledge 2018; ISBN 978-1317123811).
- The Keller Instinct: TV documentary by Hans Keller and Anton Weinberg (Channel 4, 1985)
- "Hans Keller: The Last Interview" (conversation with Anton Weinberg, transcr. and ed. Mark Doran, Tempo), No. 195 (January 1996), pp. 6–12.
- The Keller Column: Essays by Hans Keller (Ed. R. Matthew-Walker, Lengnick & Co., 1990)
- Der Turm (The Tower) Libretto: Hans Keller (G) (1983), opera in 2 acts by Josef Tal
- Hans Keller: The Jerusalem Diary – Music, Society and Politics, 1977 and 1979 (ed. C. Wintle & F. Williams) 2001, ISBN 0-9540123-0-5
- Josef Tal: "About My Friend, Hans Keller". In: Music in Time – A Publication of the Jerusalem Rubin Academy of Music and Dance (1988/89), pp. 73–76.

== Sources ==
- Oxford Dictionary of National Biography
- Grove's Dictionary of Music and Musicians

=== Further reading ===
- Garnham, Alison; Woodhouse, Susi (2018). Hans Keller 1919 - 1985: A musician in dialogue with his times. Routledge. ISBN 978-0754608981.
- Spice, Nicholas. 'The Phonic and the Phoney: Being Hans Keller', London Review of Books, 4 February 2021
