= Ursula Vaughan Williams =

English writer (1911–2007)

- Ursula and Ralph Vaughan Williams on their wedding day in 1953
- Born: Joan Ursula Penton Lock; 15 March 1911; Valletta, Malta
- Died: 23 October 2007 (aged 96); London, England
- Occupations: Poet and author
- Spouses: Michael Forrester Wood (m. 1933; died 1942) Ralph Vaughan Williams (m. 1953; died 1958)
- Parent(s): Sir Robert Lock; Kathleen Beryl Penton
- Relatives: Arthur Pole Penton (grandfather)

Joan Ursula Penton Vaughan Williams (née Lock, formerly Wood; 15 March 1911 – 23 October 2007) was an English poet and author, and biographer of her second husband, the composer Ralph Vaughan Williams.

== Biography ==
=== Early years ===
Ursula Vaughan Williams was born in Valletta, Malta, where her father, Major Robert Lock, was aide de camp to the General officer commanding, Arthur Pole Penton. Lock, later a knighted major-general, was married to Penton’s daughter Kathleen. Ursula was the eldest of their three children, having a younger sister and a younger brother (Robert John Penton), who was killed in Burma in 1944.

Army life entailed frequent moves, and her education was sporadic. She had governesses before attending a day school in England and finishing her schooling in Brussels (1927–28). By then her father was stationed in England, as commandant of the experimental station at Porton Down. The musicologist Oliver Neighbour writes that after moving from Brussels "she passed the next four years, horribly bored and reacting sharply against the social round in which she was expected to take part". Neighbour records that she occupied herself with reading, writing poetry, archaeology and amateur dramatics, "and finally escaped to London" in 1932–33 to study at the Old Vic theatre. While a student there she was able to attend some performances free of charge, and one evening she saw Job, a ballet by Ninette de Valois with a score by Ralph Vaughan Williams. It was a memorable experience that remained in her mind. She later said it "opened a new world to me".

=== First marriage ===
On 24 May 1933 she married Captain John Michael James Forrester Wood of the Royal Artillery at St Clement Danes church, London. Between then and the Second World War she wrote prose and verse and contributed to the BBC and the Times Literary Supplement, while living the peripatetic life of an army wife. In 1937 she sent Vaughan Williams – whom she had not met – a ballet scenario she had written about the Ballad of Margaret and Clark Saunders. The subject did not appeal to him, but through the intercession of Douglas Kennedy he was persuaded to consider another scenario of hers, based on Edmund Spenser's Epithalamion. Author and composer met for lunch in March 1938 and enjoyed each other's company. Despite their both being married, and a four-decade age-gap, they soon began a love affair that lasted secretly for more than a decade. Ursula became the composer's muse, helper and London companion, and later helped him care for his ailing wife, Adeline, who had arthritis so severe as to confine her to the house in Dorking where she and her husband had lived since 1929. (Note: Ralph and Adeline Vaughan Williams had previously lived at Cheyne Walk in London until the numerous stairs in their house became too much for her and caused them to move to a more manageable home, "The White Gates", Dorking. Vaughan Williams, who thought of himself as a complete Londoner, was sorry to leave the capital, but his wife was anxious to live in the country, and Dorking was within reasonably convenient reach of town.) Whether Adeline knew, or suspected, that Ursula and Vaughan Williams were lovers is uncertain, but the relations between the two women were of warm friendship throughout the years they knew each other. The composer's concern for his first wife never faltered, according to Ursula, who admitted in the 1980s that she had been jealous of Adeline, whose place in Vaughan Williams's life and affections was unchallengeable.

In 1941 her first published book of poems appeared, titled No Other Choice. The following year Michael Wood died suddenly on 8 June 1942 of heart failure aged 41. At Adeline's behest the widowed Ursula was invited to stay with the Vaughan Williamses in Dorking, and thereafter was a regular visitor there, sometimes staying for weeks at a time. The critic Michael White suggests that Adeline "appears, in the most amicable way, to have adopted Ursula as her successor". Ursula recorded that during air raids all three slept in the same room in adjacent beds, holding hands for comfort. In 1943 she published a second volume of poems, Fall of Leaf.

=== Marriage to Vaughan Williams ===
Adeline died in 1951, aged eighty. In February 1953 Vaughan Williams and Ursula were married. (Note: There were no children of the marriage.) He left the Dorking house and they took a lease of 10 Hanover Terrace, Regent's Park, London. After Vaughan Williams's return to live in London, Ursula successfully encouraged him to become much more active socially and in pro bono publico activities. With her support he resumed the composition he had been forced to set aside during his first wife's illness; Ursula wrote the libretto for two of his last choral works, including the cantata for Christmas Hodie.

Vaughan Williams died in 1958. Following his death his widow moved to Gloucester Crescent near Regent's Park, London. (Note: In Gloucester Crescent her neighbours included Alan Bennett. She appears as a character in Bennett's autobiographical play and film The Lady in the Van; in the film she is played by Frances de la Tour.) In 1964 she published RVW: A Biography of Ralph Vaughan Williams. She completed her autobiography, Paradise Remembered, in 1972, but it was published only in 2002. She wrote four novels, including Set to Partners (1968) and The Yellow Dress (1984), and five volumes of poetry. She wrote libretti for other composers, including Herbert Howells, Malcolm Williamson and Elisabeth Lutyens, for example, her "Hymn to St. Cecilia", which was set to music by Howells.

Until her death in London at the age of 96 she was honorary president of the Ralph Vaughan Williams Society. She was also the president of the English Folk Dance and Song Society. Her funeral was held at St John's Wood Church.

== Bibliography ==
- The Complete Poems of Ursula Vaughan Williams
- RVW: A Biography of Ralph Vaughan Williams by Ursula Vaughan Williams
- There was a time... A pictorial journey from the collection of Ursula Vaughan Williams
- Paradise Remembered (autobiography)
- The Collected Poems of Ursula Vaughan Williams

== Notes, references and sources ==
=== Sources ===
- Neighbour, Oliver (August 2008). "Ralph, Adeline, and Ursula Vaughan Williams: Some Facts and Speculation". Music & Letters. 89 (3): 337–345. doi:10.1093/ml/gcn042. JSTOR 30162996. (subscription required)
- Vaughan Williams, Ursula (1988) [1964]. R.V.W. – A Life of Ralph Vaughan Williams. Oxford: Clarendon Press. ISBN 978-0-19-282082-2.
