= Susan Bradshaw =

- Born: 8 September 1931; Monmouth, England
- Died: 30 January 2005 (aged 73)
- Occupations: Pianist; Composer; Educator

Susan Bradshaw (Monmouth, 8 September 1931 – London, 30 January 2005) was a British pianist, teacher, writer, and composer. She was mainly associated with contemporary music, and especially with the work of Pierre Boulez, several of whose writings she translated. As a critic and musicologist she contributed to a number of magazines and journals over several decades; the titles included Contact, Music and Musicians, Tempo and The Musical Times.

== Early life ==
Bradshaw attended the Royal Academy of Music from 1949, studying piano with Harold Craxton and composition with Howard Ferguson and Mátyás Seiber. There she met Cornelius Cardew, a fellow student, with whom she performed in Bartók's Sonata for Two Pianos and Percussion.

== Career ==
Bradshaw attended Darmstadt three times, 1956-1958 and in the last year performed there Richard Rodney Bennett's Music for Two Pianos with the composer. A recording survives of the performance. Around the same period she studied with Pierre Boulez in Paris.

Bradshaw was one of the two musicians (the other being Hans Keller) involved in the famous 'Piotr Zak' hoax in 1961.

== Legacy ==
After her death, The Susan Bradshaw Composers' Fund was established by the Royal Philharmonic Society with donations from friends and family, led by composer Brian Elias. The purpose of the fund is to support composers (of any age) and young musicians wishing to perform works by living composers. At present the fund is used to support a commission for one of the winners of the RPS Composition Prize.

Bradshaw's papers are housed at the British Library.

== Discography ==
- Mabillon Trio Avant-Garde. Music by Boulez and others. Delta, 1962
- "Dorothy Dorow - A Short Recital of English Songs", Dorothy Dorow, Soprano, Susan Bradshaw, piano. Featuring songs by Bliss, Holst, Britten, Walter Leigh, Bax, recorded June 1963, LP: Jupiter Recordings, JEP OC33.
- English choral works, John Alldis Choir, conducted by John Alldis, with Richard Rodney Bennett, piano LP: Argo ZRG 5426, 1965
- Anthony Payne, Paean for solo piano, LP: BBC Enterprises, 1977, CD: NMC D159.
- Saint-Saens, Carnival of the Animals, Vesuvius Ensemble, Poulenc, Babar the Elephant, Susan Bradshaw, solo piano, EMI BRNA 502 1977
- Gustav Holst, The Planets, for two pianos, Richard Rodney Bennett, Susan Bradshaw, LP: Delos DEL-25442 (1981), CD: FACET 8002 (1987)
- Schoenberg, Pierrot Lunaire, with Jane Manning, Vesuvius Ensemble.
- Luciano Berio, Recital 1 (For Cathy), Cathy Berberian, The London Sinfonietta, conducted by Berio; Susan Bradshaw, Piano 2, Label: RCA Red Seal, SER 5665, 1973

== Writings ==
- "Jean Barraqué", The Listener, 15 May 1969, p. 696 (About Barraqué's Sonate.)
- "The Music of Elisabeth Lutyens", The Musical Times, Vol. 112, No. 1541 (Jul., 1971), pp. 653+655-656
- "The Twentieth Century", in Keyboard Music, ed. Denis Matthews, Newton Abbot: David & Charles, 1972, ISBN 0140212507
- "New Music - Shostakovich's 15th Symphony - Anthony Payne and his ‘Paean’", Tempo 100 (Spring 1972), pp. 36-45
- "Whatever Happened to Chamber Music?", Tempo 123 (December 1977), pp. 7–9, DOI: Whatever Happened to Chamber Music?
- "Symphony No.2/Metamorphoses—The Compositional Background" [on Roberto Gerhard], Tempo 139 (December 1981), pp. 28–32 DOI: Symphony No.2/Metamorphoses—The Compositional Background
- "Cornelius Cardew (1936 – 1981)", Tempo 140 (March 1982), p. 22
- "The Music of Edison Denisov", Tempo 151 (December 1984), 2-9. doi:10.1017/S0040298200058940
- "The instrumental and vocal music", in Pierre Boulez - A Symposium, ed. William Glock, London: Eulenberg, 1986, pp. 127–230, ISBN 0 903873 12 5
- "All Fingers and Thumbs. Can We 'Interpret' Contemporary Music, or Do We Just Perform It?", The Musical Times, Vol. 135, No. 1811 (Jan., 1994), pp. 20–24
- "A Performer's Responsibility", in Composition - performance - reception: studies in the creative process in music, edited by Wyndham Thomas, Aldershot: Ashgate, 1998, pp. 53–65, ISBN 1 85928 325 X
- "Piano music: recital repertoire and chamber music", in Amanda Bayley (ed), The Cambridge Companion to Bartók, Cambridge, Cambridge University Press 2001, pp. 104–117, DOI: Piano music: recital repertoire and chamber music
- Bradshaw, Susan (2010) [2001]. "Payne, Anthony". In Northcott, Bayan (ed.). Grove Music Online. Revised by Bayan Northcott. Oxford: Oxford University Press. doi:10.1093/gmo/9781561592630.article.21136. ISBN 978-1-56159-263-0. (subscription, Wikilibrary access, or UK public library membership required)
- Bradshaw, Susan; Bennett, Richard Rodney (1972). "Anthony Payne's String Quartet". Tempo (100). Cambridge University Press: 40–44. JSTOR 942527.
- Bradshaw, Susan (March 1979). "Anthony Payne's String Quartet". Tempo (128). Cambridge University Press: 33. JSTOR 946067.

== Translations ==
- Boulez, Pierre. 1971. Boulez on Music Today, translated by Susan Bradshaw and Richard Rodney Bennett. London: Faber. ISBN 0-571-09420-1. Cambridge, Massachusetts: Harvard University Press. ISBN 0-674-08006-8.
- Jameux, Dominique. 1991. Pierre Boulez, translated by Susan Bradshaw. London: Faber. ISBN 0-571-13744-X. Cambridge, Massachusetts: Harvard University Press. ISBN 0-674-66740-9.

== As editor ==
- Hans Keller, Functional Analysis: The Unity of Contrasting Themes. Complete Edition of the Analytical Scores, ed. Gerold W. Gruber, Susan Bradshaw and Michael Meixner (Frankfurt am Main: Peter Lang, 2001)
