= Piotr Zak =

Fictional Polish composer

Piotr (or Pjotr) Zak is the name of a fictional Polish composer whose alleged composition Mobile for Tape and Percussion was broadcast twice on the BBC Third Programme on 5 June 1961 in a performance supposedly played by "Claude Tessier" and "Anton Schmidt". In fact, the composer and the performers were pseudonyms of BBC producers Hans Keller and Susan Bradshaw, who concocted the deliberately unmusical percussive piece as a hoax. According to Bradshaw, "It was a serious hoax to set people thinking that fake music can be indistinguishable from the genuine." The success of the hoax, however, is open to question. While Mobile for Tape and Percussion was reviewed seriously by several critics, all of the reviews were roundly negative, with the piece being almost instantly identified as a "non-musical" studio prank.

== History ==
=== Broadcast and critical reaction ===
The broadcast of the work was preceded by alleged biographical information about Zak in the form of a programme note supposedly written by Schmidt. The text read by the announcer (Alvar Lidell) was as follows:

Piotr Zak, who is of Polish extraction but lives in Germany, was born in 1939. His earliest works are conservative, but he has recently come under the influence of Stockhausen and John Cage. This work for tape and percussion was written between May and September of last year. Within the precise and complex framework defined by the score, there is considerable room for improvisation.

The work was reviewed by three critics, who gave unenthusiastic or outright condemnatory reactions.

Jeremy Noble's review in the Times stated "It was certainly difficult to grasp more than the music's broad outlines, partly because of the high proportion of unpitched sounds and partly because of their extreme diversity". Noble deemed the broadcast a "lapse" on the part of the BBC, and wrote "such recognizably musical events as did occur seemed trivial".

Further down the scale from Noble's overall pan (leavened with some extremely faint praise), the Daily Telegraph's′ critic Donald Mitchell called the performance "wholly unrewarding", adding that Zak

exploited the percussion with only limited enterprise and his tape emitted a succession of whistles, rattles and punctured sighs that proclaimed, all too shamelessly, their non-musical origins....There was nothing, one felt, to "understand" here. It was only the composer's ingenuousness that was mysterious. … How demanding Mozart [Serenade for Winds, K. 361] seems after the innocence of Mr. Nono [Polifonica–Monodia–Ritmica] and Mr. Zak!

Rollo Myers, writing in the Listener, was harsher still, accurately identifying the piece as a farce d'atelier (studio prank) with "no possible claim to be considered as music", and characterising the BBC's broadcast of such a thing "a serious error of judgment". Myers continued,

What made the whole thing all the more deplorable was the high-falutin' publicity surrounding it in which we were told, inter alia, that ". . . the tape exploits the full range of the aural spectrum, controlled by strictly measurable quantities—frequency ratios, velocity graphs and decibel indexes"—all this to describe what seemed to me to be a series of the more unpleasant kinds of kitchen noises, accompanied by bangs and thumps, hisses, shrieks and whistles.

He concluded with praise for the other works on the programme, by Webern, Nono, Petrassi, and "the always satisfying Serenade in B flat for thirteen wind instruments by Mozart—which may have been missed by the many listeners who, I am sure, switched off their sets for the repeat performance of the Zak".

=== Admission of hoax ===
Nearly two months after the event, a BBC spokesman denied that the work was a hoax, describing it instead as an "experiment", in which "the percussion instruments on the tape were played at random. I imagine that Piotr Zak does not exist. But we did not hoax the listeners. It was an experiment". A conflicting report published the next day claimed that the BBC confessed the entire programme had been a hoax. It was revealed that the piece had been produced by Hans Keller and Susan Bradshaw at the BBC. By striking randomly and with deliberate senselessness at a collection of percussion instruments, the two (as "Tessier" and "Schmidt") had produced a strenuously meaningless twelve-minute "work" of superficially "avant-garde" character; this was completed by the addition of a selection of human whistling sounds (evidently meant to represent the "tape"), and with the resulting chaos being edited into some kind of whole by BBC technicians.

Revealing the true nature of the work was itself apparently part of the publicity for the BBC broadcast of a radio documentary, The Strange Case of Piotr Zak, first aired on 13 August 1961, in which Keller discussed his hoax with music critics Jeremy Noble and Donald Mitchell. Both critics agreed that the manner of presentation required them to take the piece seriously, but, since they both had given it an unfavourable review, they could not be said to have been fully taken in by the hoax.

In the months and years after the original broadcast, some tellings of the story indicated that Zak's work received favourable reviews from critics unable to distinguish random noise from genuine avant-garde music. However, in an October 1961 editorial in The Musical Times, editor Andrew Porter noted of 'The Zak Affair' that while some reports indicated that "critics were taken in by it....Let it go on record that this was not the case." After discussing and quoting several contemporaneous reviews (and referencing the similar Ern Malley affair that caused controversy in modern poetry circles 16 years earlier), Porter wrote that "the critics showed clearly that they could distinguish between Zak and Stockhausen – whose Zyklus, 'bashed out' by an imported solo percussionist at an earlier BBC concert, was praised."

=== Zak as reviewer ===
Despite Porter's editorial, "Pjotr Zak" (whose first name had always been previously identified as "Piotr") wrote a piece for The Musical Times a few months later. Written in actuality by Keller, it appeared in the July 1962 issue. Zak's piece was a 700-word review of Stockhausen's score for Zyklus, a work that had debuted in performance in 1959, but was not published as a score until 1962.

Zak's review discussed the nature of the score, which allows for improvisation, while indicating that he could not answer the question of how the meaning of Stockhausen's score was "audibly different from (a) a completely free improvisation from the same performer, or indeed (b) an experiment of the kind my Mobile has immortalized." However, Zak went on to write that "nobody interested in the development of creative thought can allow himself to remain ignorant of Stockhausen's score." He also humorously suggested that while Stockhausen was unquestionably an influence on "Zak", Zak's Mobile may have been an influence on the published score for Zyklus..."even though neither Stockhausen nor I may readily admit the fact".

== See also ==
Compare to:

- Sokal affair, publishing hoax
- Ern Malley, fictitious poet
- Naked Came the Stranger, publishing hoax
