= Jane's Minstrels =

Jane's Minstrels was a virtuoso British new music ensemble set up in 1988 by the English soprano Jane Manning and her husband, the composer Anthony Payne. Its founder members were the horn player and conductor, Roger Montgomery, the pianist Dominic Saunders and the guitarist Stephanie Power; later they were joined by the clarinetist Dov Goldberg, the percussionist Richard Benjafield, the violinist Fenella Barton and the pianist/composer Matthew King among others.

Jane's Minstrels established an international reputation as performers of a broad repertoire: the group has performed fantasias by Purcell, chamber works by Elgar, Frank Bridge and Percy Grainger as well as Schoenberg and Webern. Since the ensemble's beginning, Manning championed Pierrot lunaire and a number of twentieth century works influenced by it, ranging from William Walton's Façade to Miss Donnithorne's Maggot by Peter Maxwell Davies.

The critic Ivan Hewett wrote of the group in 2010:

Twenty-one years ago Manning founded her own chamber ensemble of bright young players just out of college. The players are all seasoned pros now, but when she appears among them Jane Manning still has that air of a flamboyant, slightly eccentric but formidable grand dame who’s very pleased with her proteges.

Jane's Minstrels gave first performances and made recordings of numerous composers including Elisabeth Lutyens, Anthony Payne, Judith Weir, Matthew King, Brian Elias, Justin Connolly, James MacMillan and Colin Matthews.
