= John Whitfield (conductor) =

British musician and conductor (1957-2019)

John Whitfield (21 March 1957 – 4 November 2019) was a British musician and conductor from Darlington, England.

Whitfield was educated at Leighton Park School, Reading followed by Chetham's School of Music, Manchester and Keble College, Oxford.

Contemporaneously he was principal bassoon of National Youth Orchestra (GB) and European Community (now Union) Youth Orchestra, EUYO. He was awarded Associate of the Royal College of Music with honours at just 17 and an MA in music from Oxford University.

== Conducting career ==
Whitfield founded Endymion, which he conducted at venues around the world. The ensemble is noted for its performances of modern classical music, particularly by British composers.

As a conductor he toured for Arts Council Contemporary Music Network and performed at state occasions for Queen Elizabeth II, gave numerous broadcasts and recordings for BBC Radio 3, BBC Two television, and ITV, and made recordings for EMI of Britten and Stravinsky.

From 1991 to 2006 he worked very closely as both assistant and pupil of Sir Charles Mackerras.

He conducted first performances and commissioned works from among others Harrison Birtwistle, Dominic Muldowney, Michael Nyman, Nigel Osborne, Giles Swayne, Judith Weir, and Mark Anthony Turnage.

== Other activities ==
Whitfield played solo ocarina on a recording of works by Frank Denyer, Continuum CCD 1026 (1991) and solo recorder under Richard Hickox in Benjamin Britten Noye's Fludde on Virgin Classics. Whitfield won several awards during his time playing the bassoon with the National Youth Orchestra. Before leaving Oxford he was invited in 1978 by Lillian Hochhauser to audition for Rudolph Barshai who immediately offered him the post of first bassoon with the Israel Chamber Orchestra.

He also edited performing editions of operas for the Royal Opera House and the English National Opera, and four Franz Lehár operettas for publication by Weinberger. His arrangement for wind quintet of Mozart's Serenade in Bb, K361 was published by Spartan Press in late 2014.

== Partial discography ==
- Phaedra/Les Illuminations - EMI (1995); conducting Endymion; music of Benjamin Britten.
- Dumbarton Oaks - EMI (1988); conducting Endymion; music of Igor Stravinsky.
- Lichtbogen - Finlandia FACD-361 (1989); conducting Endymion; music of Kaija Saariaho

== Awards ==
- 1977 Silver Medal, Shell/London Symphony Orchestra Competition
- 1978 Worshipful Company of Musicians Arthur Bulgin Medal
- 1978 National Youth Orchestra Lloyds Bank Award
