= Naresh Sohal =

Indian composer (1939–2018)

Naresh Sohal (18 September 1939 – 30 April 2018) was a British composer of Indian origin. He wrote in the tradition of western classical music. He was the first composer in this tradition ever to make settings of texts in Punjabi and Bengali (although he also made many settings in English). He was the first composer ever to be offered an annual bursary by the Arts Council of Great Britain. Sohal was the first Non Resident Indian (NRI) ever to be awarded a Padma Shri (Order of the Lotus) by the Indian Government.

Although Sohal wrote in the Western idiom, his extensive range of compositions shows a long-standing and serious commitment to the insights of Hindu philosophy.

== Early life and education ==
Sohal was born in Punjab, Northern India. From an early age, he showed an interest in popular music, his tastes being influenced by the broadcasts of All India Radio and Radio Ceylon. He did not come from a musical family, but his father, Des Raj, was an Urdu poet of some reputation and poets often held gatherings at the family home in Jalandhar. By the time Sohal reached college - he attended DAV college, where he studied Science and Mathematics - he had acquired a harmonica and become a versatile performer of rock and roll and Indian film songs, and once entertained the President of India at a college gathering. He also tried his hand at composition, writing marches and waltzes for the Punjab Armed Police Band.

It became clear that his ambitions lay outside the disciplines he studied, although he always maintained an interest in pure Physics. Without graduating, he made off to Bombay to seek a musical role in the film industry. But while he was there, he had his first encounter with Western classical music, hearing Beethoven's Eroica Symphony on the radio during the monsoon. This was a transformative experience. He determined to learn more about how such music was created. His resolve hardened when an Indian musician refused to teach him Indian classical music on the mouth organ. In 1962, he left India for the United Kingdom, intending to find a way to learn to write western music.

== Composition ==
Sohal was largely self-educated in music, but was mentored for some time by the composer and teacher Jeremy Dale Roberts whom he held in high regard. He became a copyist at publisher Boosey & Hawks and began composing in earnest. He had his first work, Asht Prahar, performed at a Society for the Promotion of New Music (SPNM) concert in 1970. After that, he went on to produce well over sixty works, ranging from small chamber works to vast works for orchestra, chorus and soloists, as well as scores for film and TV.

His larger works include The Wanderer for chorus, orchestra and baritone soloist which premiered at the BBC Proms in 1982; A recording from that performance was issued in 2025. From Gitanjali; Tandava Nritya; Lila, Hymn of Creation; Gautama Buddha, a ballet on the life of Buddha, performed in Houston, Texas and at the Edinburgh International Festival in 1989; Dhyan 1 for 'cello and orchestra; violin and viola concertos; and two chamber operas, Madness Lit by Lightning, and Maya, which he wrote in partnership with the librettist Trevor Preston.

Sohal was always concerned with the existential questions at the heart of Indian philosophy and maintained an interest in the musical culture of the sub-continent. For instance The Divine Song for narrator and orchestra focuses on the central message of the Bhagavad Gita, which concerns fulfilling one's responsibilities in the face of difficult choices. In the 1980s he produced a collection of contemporary ghazals. in the tradition of Northern India.

Television work includes music for the STV documentary 'Sir William in Search of Xanadu' (which marked the opening of the Burrell Collection), and the Granada TV series 'End of Empire'.

== Later career and death ==
After eleven years as a resident of Edinburgh, he returned to London where he lived for twenty-six years. He married the writer Janet Swinney in 2013. The premiere of Sohal's second Proms commission, his 45-minute The Cosmic Dance, took place on 2 August 2013. His last great ambition was to write a large-scale opera. Unfortunately, this was not fulfilled. He was working on an orchestral piece for the South Bank Centre in London when he died unexpectedly in 2018, on Vesak, the day that marks the birth, enlightenment and death of Buddha.

The earlier part of his catalogue is held by Wise Music The later part of his catalogue is held by Composers Edition. The works held by Composers Edition can also be found in six of the UK's main libraries. His estate is managed by his widow, Janet Swinney.

== Style, performances ==
His contribution to twentieth/twenty-first century classical music in the West is entirely unique, reflecting as it does, a dual cultural perspective but complete fluency in the musical tradition he adopted. Critics have referred to Sohal's style as follows:-

- "Sohal's music is dominated by a wonderful sense of colour – for that reason he loves above all to write for the orchestra with its endless range of timbres and textures... His musical style is unique and independent, indeed maverick." – Music Current, September 1989.
- "Like Berlioz or Tippett, his musical style has a maverick independence and a peculiar set of criteria all its own." – Meirion Bowen, The Guardian, 21 August 1982.
- "His is a particularly distinctive voice." – Carol Main, Scotland on Sunday, 18 September 1992.

In 1987, the composer was awarded a Padma Shri (Order of the Lotus) by the Indian government for his services to music.

Sohal's works have been performed both nationally and internationally. Artistes who have performed them include Jane Manning and Sally Silver, sopranos; David Wilson-Johnson, baritone; Xue Wei, violin; Barry Buy, double bass; Rivka Golani, viola; Rohan de Saram, cello; the ConTempo, Dante and Edinburgh quartets; the BBC Scottish Symphony Orchestra under Sir Andrew Davis, Indonesian pianist Ananda Sukarlan and the New York Philharmonic under Zubin Mehta. There were performances of his work at the Dartington and Spitalfields festivals in the UK. In 2006, he was a guest of the Pan-Asian Music Festival at Stanford University, USA, where his Songs of the Five Rivers was performed. Sohal's orchestral work was championed chiefly by Zubin Mehta and Sir Andrew Davis, each of whom commissioned two works from him.

== Recordings ==
- Complete Piano Music (including Piano Trio). Konstantinos Destounis, Toccata 0689 (2023)
- Lila, Violin Concerto. Xue Wei, Sarah Leonard, BBC Symphony Orchestra, Martyn Brabbins. Heritage HTGCD 133 (2025)
- String Quartets. Piatti Quartet, Toccata 0754 (2025)
- The Wanderer and Asht Prahar. David Wilson-Johnson, Jane Manning, BBC Symphony Orchestra; BBC Scottish Symphony Orchestra, Sir Andrew Davis, HTGCD 135 (2025)
- Vocal and Instrumental Music, BBC recordings, Heritage HTGCD122-3 (2026)

== Selected works ==
- Asht Prahar for soprano and orchestra (1965)
- Concerto for harmonica, percussion and strings (for Larry Adler) (1966)
- Aalaykhyam I for orchestra (1970)
- Kavita 1, settings of Tagore for soprano and eight solo instruments (1970)
- Poems of Tagore 1, solo voices and ensemble (1970)
- Surya for chorus, percussion and solo flute (1970)
- Hexad for small ensemble (1971)
- Night's Poet, Tagore setting for soprano and two clarinets (1971)
- Aalaykhyam II for orchestra (1972)
- Octal, for chamber ensemble with electronics (1972)
- Chiaroscuro II (String Quartet No. 1) (1976)
- Poems of Tagore 2, solo voices and ensemble (1977)
- Dhyan 1 for cello and orchestra (1979)
- Inscape, Tagore setting for choir, solo flute, percussion and electronics (1979)
- The Wanderer for chorus and orchestra (BBC Proms commission, 1981)
- From Gitanjali for bass baritone and orchestra (1984)
- Tandava Nritya (Dance of Destruction and Re-creation) for orchestra (1984)
- Violin Concerto (1986)
- Gautama Buddha, ballet (1987)
- Piano Trio (1988)
- Madness Lit By Lightning, chamber opera (1989)
- Poems of Tagore 3, soprano and cello (1994)
- Lila, for soprano and orchestra (1996)
- Satyagraha for orchestra (London Symphony Orchestra commission, 1997)
- Maya, chamber opera (1998)
- Hymn of Creation for soloists, chorus and orchestra (1999)
- Concertino for cello and strings (2000)
- Songs of the Five Rivers soprano and orchestra (2002)
- Viola Concerto (2002)
- String Quartet No. 2 (2005)
- The Divine Song for narrator and orchestra (2008)
- String Quartet No. 3 (2008)
- Three Symphonic Sketches for orchestra (2008)
- String Quartet No. 4 (2009)
- String Quartet No. 5 (2010)
- Poems of Tagore 4, soprano and violin (2010)
- The Cosmic Dance for orchestra (BBC Proms, 2013)
- Awakening for soprano and string quartet (2016)
