= Melinda Maxwell =

English oboist and composer

Melinda Maxwell (born 1953 in London) is an English oboist and composer. She is principal oboist of the ensemble Endymion and the Birmingham Contemporary Music Group, and a regularly principal of the London Sinfonietta. She has been an academic teacher at the Royal Academy of Music, Birmingham Conservatoire, Trinity College and the Royal Northern College of Music.

== Compositions ==
- Pibroch for solo oboe and drone (1981)
- Transformations for soprano and chamber ensemble (1990)
- Endless Chain for oboe, saxophone and percussion (1992)
- Elegy for oboe and piano (1994)
- Three movements for solo clarinet (1994)
- Pelagos for string trio (1995)
- From Tree to Tree for string sextet (1998)
- Songlines and Cadences for clarinet and harp (1999)
- Song for Sidney for solo oboe and two echo oboes (2001)
- Crane Dance for double-reed ensemble (2008)
- Singla Rock for mixed quintet (2009)
