= Blooms of Dublin =

1982 musical play or operetta in two acts with music and text by Anthony Burgess

- First edition (publ. Hutchinson)
- Written by: Anthony Burgess

Blooms of Dublin is a musical play or operetta in two acts with music and text by Anthony Burgess. The work, nearly three hours long, was first performed (in a concert version) for the Dublin Joyce Centenary in 1982 by the RTE Singers and RTE Concert Orchestra and broadcast on BBC and RTÉ radio. It was produced by John Tydeman and Michael Heffernan.

The operetta is based on James Joyce's 1922 novel Ulysses. It was published in book form in 1986. The texts of some of the songs also appear in the novels Earthly Powers (1980) and The End of World News (1982).

Burgess provides a very free interpretation of Joyce's text, with his own changes and interpolations, all set to original music that blends opera with Gilbert and Sullivan and music hall styles. The number "Copulation Without Population" in Act Two is an example – it is set in the style of a humorous, bawdy music hall romp and features a chorus of drunks and prostitutes - but it has little to do with the corresponding passage from Ulysses. Burgess said that his aim was to make Ulysses more accessible. "The score is, I think, the kind of thing Joyce might have envisaged…he was the great master of the ordinary, and my music is ordinary enough. I had felt for some time that he might have had demotic musicals in mind ….".

The piece received mixed reviews. Hans Keller called it "a pathetic pastiche" in which "senseless tonal and rhythmic antics...take the place of even the most elementary invention." Aside from one repeat broadcast in 1983 it has not been revived, and has never been staged. A BBC archived recording exists.

Other works that Burgess wrote or adapted as stage musicals include A Clockwork Orange: A Play with Music (1987) and (with music by Michael J. Lewis) Cyrano, a new musical which ran for 49 performances on Broadway in May 1973.
