= King Harald's Saga =

Opera by Judith Weir

- Monodrama by Judith Weir
- Librettist: Weir
- Language: English
- Based on: Snorri Sturlson's Heimskringla
- Premiere: 17 May 1979

King Harald's Saga, Grand opera in three acts for unaccompanied solo soprano singing eight rôles (based on the saga 'Heimskringla' by Snorri Sturlson, 1179-1241) is a monodrama by Judith Weir, commissioned by Jane Manning and premiered on 17 May 1979. The score was published by Novello in 1982, and lasts under ten minutes, making it one of the shortest operas, and is possibly unique in having no instrumental accompaniment.

== Synopsis ==
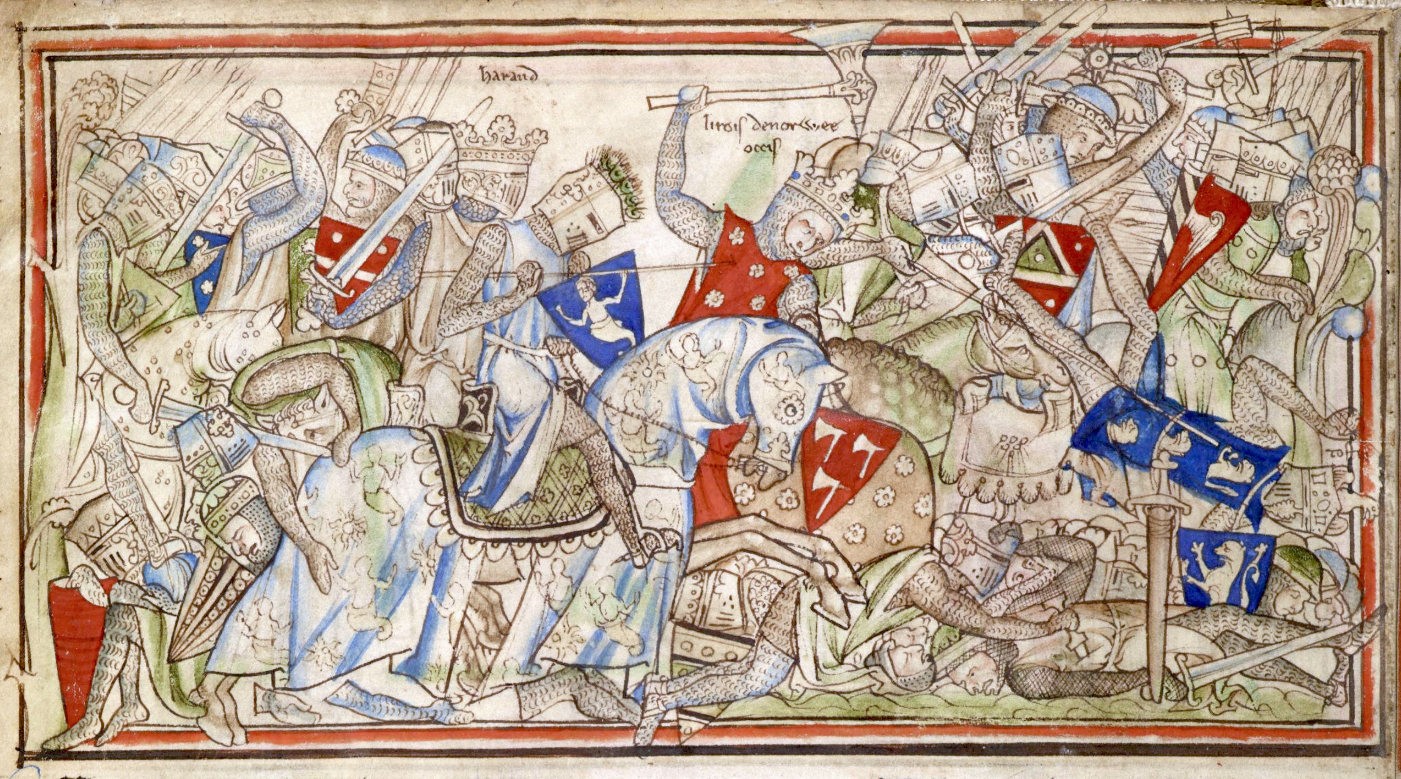
The Battle of Stamford Bridge

=== Act 1 ===
King Harald of Norway sings of his exploits: "Whereas my brother the blessed and holy man Olaf said: Love thine enemies, I say: sever their limbs until they cause no trouble." A distant fanfare announces the arrival of Earl Tostig, an English traitor who urges Harald to invade his homeland.

=== Act 2 ===
Harald's dead brother Saint Olaf appears in a dream to warn him the expedition is ill-fated, but Harald gives the order to depart. His two wives sing a duet of farewell.

=== Act 3 ===
The Norwegian Army lands at Scarborough, singing a chorus of praise for their leader which is interrupted by a messenger warning of the approaching army of Harold II of England. A surviving soldier narrates Harald's death in the battle of Stamford Bridge.

=== Epilogue ===
An Icelandic sage watches the corpses being brought back to Oslo: "I could have told him it would end like this."
