= Larry Goves =

British composer (born 1980)

Larry Goves (born 1980 in Cardiff, Wales) is a British composer.

A PhD student at the University of Southampton, his tutor is Michael Finnissy. In addition to Undergraduate and Postgraduate studies at the Royal Northern College of Music, he has studied privately with Richard Barrett and Simon Holt. He has received commissions from the Nash Ensemble, the London Sinfonietta, the BBC Philharmonic and many others. He is a founder and performer with the ensemble the House of Bedlam. His music has been broadcast by BBC Radio 3. The chamber piece walking underground (2000) was recorded by the London Sinfonietta on the NMC label, as has his solo oboe piece the tentacles of memory (2003), released on Dutton Epoch. Goves has been serving as Head of School of Composition at the Royal Northern College of Music since 2023.

In 2011, Goves' work Virtual Airport was nominated for the Chamber-Scale Composition Prize at the Royal Philharmonic Society Music Awards.

In 2023 Goves received an Ivor Novello Award nomination at The Ivors Classical Awards 2023. Crow Rotations for soprano, flute/alto flute, alto saxophone, cello and electronics was nominated for Best Small Chamber Composition.
