= General Loch =

General Loch may refer to:

- Edward Loch, 2nd Baron Loch (1873–1942), British Army major general
- Herbert Loch (1886–1976), German Wehrmacht general of the artillery
- Kenneth Loch (1890–1961), British Army lieutenant general

== See also ==
- General Locke (disambiguation)
