= Robert Lock (British Army officer) =

British army officer (1879–1957)

Major-General Sir Robert Lock KBE CB
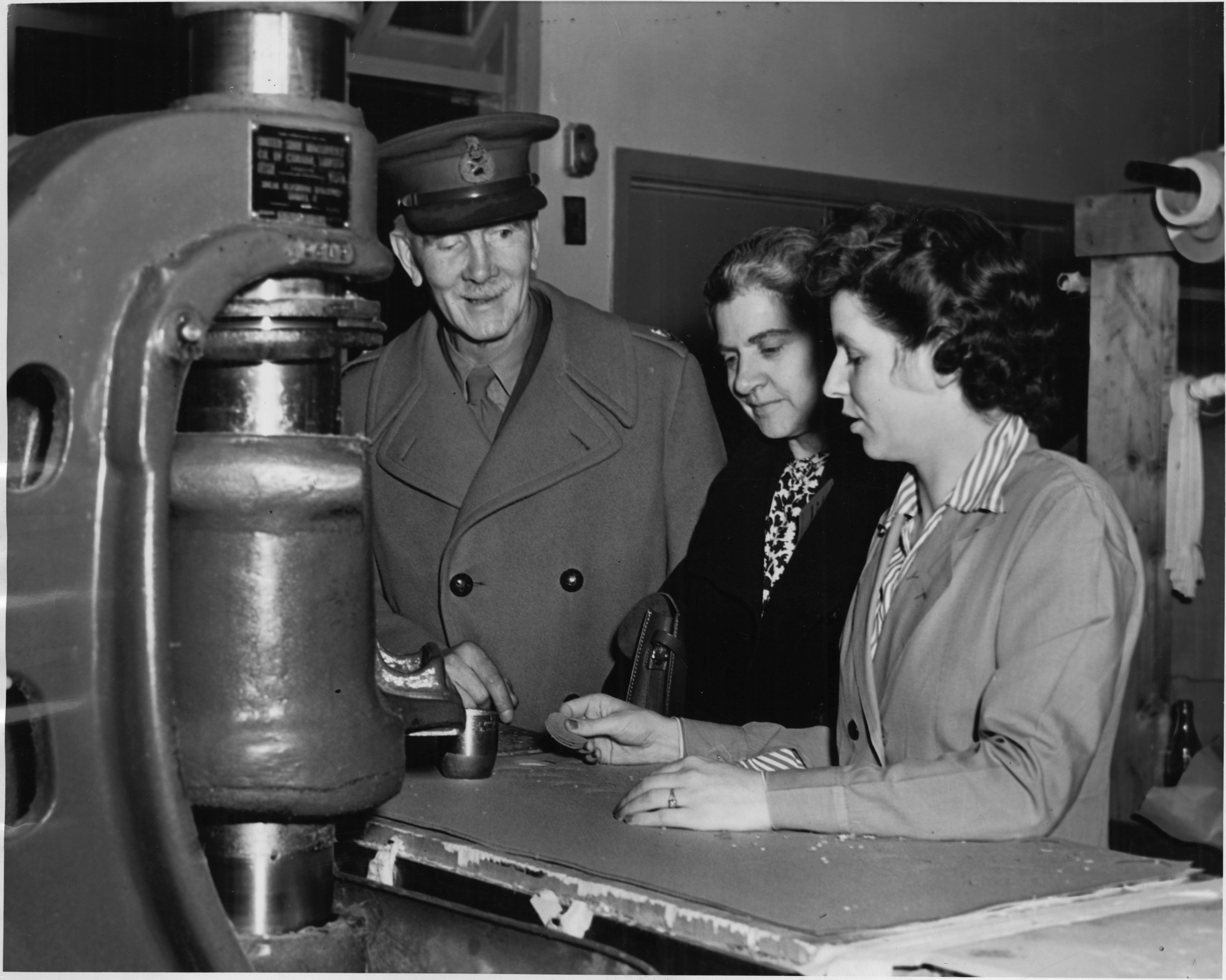
- Major-General Lock and Mrs Lock watching Mrs Kay Thompson operate a clicking machine at the General Engineering Company (Canada) munitions plant, May 1943
- Born: 13 December 1879
- Died: 25 July 1957 (aged 77)
- Relatives: Arthur Pole Penton (father-in-law); Ursula Vaughan Williams (daughter); Ralph Vaughan Williams (son-in-law)
- Military career
- Allegiance: United Kingdom
- Branch: British Army
- Service years: 1898–1938; 1939–1943
- Rank: Major-General
- Unit: Royal Artillery
- Commands: Chemical Defence Experimental Station (1928–32)
- Conflicts: First World War; Second World War
- Awards: Knight Commander of the Order of the British Empire; Companion of the Order of the Bath

Major-General Sir Robert Ferguson Lock, KBE, CB (13 December 1879 – 25 July 1957) was a British Army officer in the Royal Artillery who served during the First World War.

== Military career ==
Lock was commissioned a second lieutenant in the Royal Garrison Artillery on 23 June 1898, and was promoted to lieutenant on 16 February 1901. He was seconded to take a course of instruction at the School of Gunnery in 1903.

Lock was appointed a Companion of the Order of the Bath in 1937 and a Knight Commander of the Order of the British Empire in 1944.

== Family ==
Lock married Kathleen Beryl Penton, daughter of Arthur Pole Penton, in 1910. They had two daughters and a son, Robert John Penton Lock, who was killed in action on 26 March 1944 while serving with the 28th Mountain Regiment in Burma in the Second World War. Their daughter, Ursula, was a noted poet who married the composer Ralph Vaughan Williams.
