= Arthur Pole Penton =

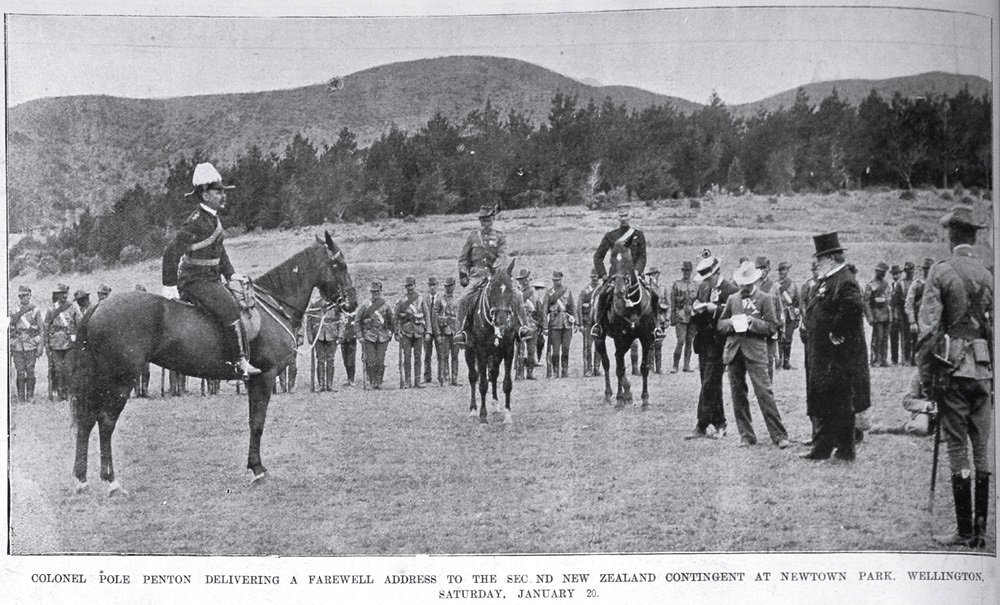
- Pole Penton aloft a horse (left) delivering an address to personnel of the Second New Zealand Contingent that was about to depart for the Second Boer War in 1900
- Born: 6 October 1854
- Died: 28 August 1920 (aged 65)
- Military career
- Allegiance: United Kingdom
- Branch: Royal Artillery
- Service years: 1873–1920
- Rank: Major-General
- Commands: New Zealand Defence Forces
- Conflicts: Second Anglo-Afghan War
- Awards: Companion of the Order of the Bath; * Companion of the Order of St Michael and St George * Commander of the Royal Victorian Order
- Other work: Member of the Executive Council of Malta (1909–1920)

Major-General Arthur Pole Penton CB CMG CVO (6 October 1854 – 28 August 1920) was a British officer in the Royal Artillery, and Commandant of the New Zealand Defence Forces from 1897 to 1901.

== Military career ==
Penton was commissioned a lieutenant in the Royal Artillery on 9 January 1873. He served in the Second Anglo-Afghan War in 1878 and was mentioned in dispatches. Promotion to captain came on 7 July 1882, and to major on 1 October 1889. He was Commandant of the New Zealand Defence Forces between 1896 and 1901, during which he received the substantive promotion to lieutenant-colonel on 15 December 1898.

In 1902 he was in charge of the Militia and Volunteer Artillery in the North-Eastern district, in command of the depôt at Scarborough, North Yorkshire. For services in connection with the colonial military contingents visiting the United Kingdom for the 1902 Coronation of King Edward VII and Queen Alexandra, he was awarded the Coronation Medal in silver. He received a brevet promotion to colonel on 15 December 1902, and later advanced to major-general on 7 December 1909.

He was appointed Honorary Colonel of the 13th (North Canterbury) Regiment in 1911.

He was also a member of the Executive Council of Malta from 1909 until his death in 1920.

He was made CVO in 1909, CB in 1910, and CMG in 1917.

== Family ==
His daughter Beryl Katherine married Sir Robert Lock.
