= Quentin Poole =

English oboist and conductor (born 1957)

Quentin H. Poole (born 1957) is an English oboist, conductor and former boy chorister, who served as Head Chorister of King's College, Cambridge.

Poole was born in Surrey, England, the son of Joseph W. Poole and Esme B. Mounsey Poole, but he grew up, as the youngest of five children, at Coventry, where his father was Precentor of Coventry Cathedral. He learned piano from the age of seven and trained under Sir David Willcocks at King's College, where he joined the choir aged nine. He also took up the flute there. He subsequently sang in the choir of The King's School, Canterbury, and was a member of the National Youth Orchestra.

He studied at Corpus Christi College, Cambridge, and then at the Royal Academy of Music under Janet Craxton.

Poole was a founder, member and oboist of the Endymion Ensemble and later its conductor. He was also principal oboe for the City of London Sinfonia and other orchestras and chamber groups. He was Director of Music of the Purcell School from 2001, from which he was made redundant in 2013. He was made a Fellow of the Royal Academy of Music in 2004.

He appeared as a castaway on the BBC Radio programme Desert Island Discs on 26 December 1970. He was 13 at the time; the programme's youngest guest. His picture was published in a contemporary issue of the Radio Times.
