= NMC Recordings =

British recording label

- Founded: 1989
- Founder: Colin Matthews
- Genre: Contemporary classic music by composers from the British Isles
- Country of origin: U.K.
- Official website: http://www.nmcrec.co.uk

NMC Recordings is a British recording label and a charity which specialises in recording works by living composers from the British Isles.

== History ==
The composer Colin Matthews founded NMC in 1989, with financial assistance from the Holst Foundation. NMC is an abbreviation for "New Music Cassettes", which refers to the intended main means of packaging its recordings at the time. Matthews continues as a producer of NMC's recordings. NMC was originally administered through the Society for the Promotion of New Music. In 1992, NMC became independent, and Matthews invited Bill Colleran to become NMC's first board chairman. Colleran served in this capacity from 1993 to 2004.

Additional financial support for NMC resulted after the 1993 Copyright Duration Directive (93/98/EEC), which extended the copyright term from 50 to 70 years. As a result, the music of Gustav Holst came back into copyright, and NMC obtained increased funding. However, it has fallen out of copyright again, and the Holst Foundation will stop its activities in 2015, leaving NMC with a significant gap in funding.

As a charity, NMC is presided over by a board of trustees.

== Recordings ==
NMC D001, Bhakti

NMC's first recordings, from 1989, were of Jonathan Harvey's Bhakti (NMC D001) NMC Recordings | contemporary classical music and a recital of contemporary solo piano music by Michael Finnissy (NMC D002). NMC's first opera recording was of Harrison Birtwistle's The Mask of Orpheus (NMC D050). Its single best-selling issue is of Anthony Payne's realisation of the sketches for Edward Elgar's Symphony No. 3 (NMC D053). NMC's catalogue has now over 200 recordings. NMC releases 10 to 12 discs per year. NMC has several sub-categories within its releases:

- Archive series: important works and historical recordings from the 20th century
- Ancora series: reissues of recordings deleted from other labels (e.g. Collins Classics)
- Debut Discs series: release of 12 discs devoted to a single composer's work and in partnership with Graphic Design students from Central Saint Martins College of Arts and Design, who created the artwork for each album's cover. The releases are:
1. Huw Watkins: In my Craft or Sullen Art
2. Sam Hayden: presence/absence
3. Dai Fujikura: Secret Forest
4. Joseph Phibbs: The Canticle of the Rose
5. Richard Causton: Millennium Scenes
6. Larry Goves: Just stuff people do
7. Ben Foskett: Dinosaur
8. Helen Grime: Night Songs
9. Charlotte Bray: At the Speed of Stillness
- Sinfonietta Shorts: short pieces by today's leading composers, commissioned and premiered by the principal players of the London Sinfonietta. The series started in 2008 to celebrate the ensemble's 40th birthday. The works are:
1. Harrison Birtwistle: Duet 3 (supported by Nick & Claire Prettejohn)
2. Mark Bowden: Parable (created on Writing the Future, generously supported by Michael and Patricia McLaren-Turner and Anthony Mackintosh)
3. Dai Fujikura: es (supported by Robert Clark and Susan Costello)
4. Jonathan Harvey: Little Duo (supported by Sir John and Lady Tusa)
5. Anna Meredith: Axeman

NMC has an overriding principle of maintaining all its titles in its catalogue and not deleting any issues.

== Charity status and funding ==
NMC is a registered charity (no 328052) because of the public benefit it provides through its contribution to enriching British cultural life. It operates as a limited company and within Charity Commission guidelines. As the recordings it releases rarely break even, NMC needs the financial support of trusts, foundations and individuals to operate. All profits from sales are invested back in the organisation and recordings are selected through an Artistic Panel, which ensures that they are chosen based on quality and in order to maintain balance in the catalogue.

NMC is receives core funding from the Holst Foundation and the Britten-Pears Foundation. It is also supported by the following trusts and foundations: Angus Allnatt Charitable Foundation, The Amphion Foundation Inc, The Eric Anker-Petersen Charity, Anonymous, The Astor Foundation, The Aurelius Charitable Trust, The Boltini Trust, The John S Cohen Foundation, Colwinston Charitable Trust, The Delius Trust, The Fenton Arts Trust, The Finzi Trust, The Garrick Charitable Trust, Nicholas and Judith Goodison’s Charitable Settlement, Hargreaves and Ball Trust, The Hinrichsen Foundation New Initiatives programme, The Nicholas John Trust, Lord and Lady Lurgan Trust, The Mercers’ Charitable Foundation, The Monument Trust, The Peter Moores Foundation, Stanley Picker Trust, The Radcliffe Trust, The Roche Foundation, The RVW Trust, The N Smith Charitable Settlement, The Steel Charitable Trust, The Surrey Square Charitable Trust, The Richard Thomas Foundation, The Barbara Whatmore Charitable Trust, The Zochonis Charitable Trust.

== Celebrating 20 years:The NMC Songbook ==
To mark its 20th anniversary in 2009, NMC Recordings commissioned The NMC Songbook, a collection of art-songs from 96 composers, each on the general theme of "Britain", scored for one or two voices, and various instrumental accompaniments. NMC recorded the collection of songs (NMC D150) for commercial release in April 2009. This recording received the Gramophone Contemporary Award in 2009.

In parallel, the label curated a series of 4 concerts, the first public performances of the songs, at Kings Place, London from 1–4 April 2009.

== Celebrating 25 years: Opera releases and other projects ==
=== Anniversary Opera Releases ===
To celebrate its 25 years, NMC released three major British contemporary operas, funded by a special anniversary appeal. NMC managed to raise over £40,000, thanks to eight trusts and foundations and more than 50 individual donors, in order to produce these landmark works and to give them a permanent place in its catalogue. The three operas are:

- Harrison Birtwistle's Gawain (NMC D200, Gramophone Award in 1996 (Collins Classics))
- Judith Weir's The Vanishing Bridegroom (NMC D196)
- Gerald Barry's The Importance of Being Earnest (NMC D197), inspired by the song he contributed to The NMC Songbook

=== Partnership projects ===
Over recent years, NMC has developed a lot of partnerships with various organisations. In its anniversary year, it furthered these partnerships by working closely with the London Sinfonietta (on Larry Goves's Just stuff people do, NMC D198) and the Hallé (on John Casken's Orion over Farne, NMC D189 and Helen Grime's Night Song, NMC D199). For the first time, NMC teamed up with leading dance companies – Sadler's Wells and Rambert – to release Mark-Anthony's UNDANCE. The year of NMC's 25th Anniversary will also see the creation of a partnership with the Science Museum and Aurora Orchestra.

=== Next Wave ===
NMC, in collaboration with Sound and Music, offered professional support, mentoring and commissioning to a dozen student composers for the Next Wave project, aiming at bridging the gap between composing in a university setting and pursuing a career as a professional composer.

=== Wigmore Hall ===
For its 25th anniversary, NMC decided to rebalance its catalogue and to remedy to its lack of string quartet compositions. Therefore, it collaborated with Wigmore Hall to commission six quartets, premiered and released in two volumes over the next couple of years featuring: Mark-Anthony Turnage + Belcea Quartet; Simon Holt + Jack Quartet; Anthony Gilbert + Carducci Quartet; Helen Grime + Heath Quartet; Donnacha Dennehy + Doric Quartet; and Paul Newland + Elias Quartet.

== Awards ==
Several NMC releases have won critical awards:

- Robin Holloway: Second Concerto for Orchestra (NMC D015M; 1994 Gramophone Magazine Award)
- Harrison Birtwistle: The Mask of Orpheus (NMC D050; 1998 Gramophone Award)
- Jonathan Harvey: Body Mandala (NMC D141; 2008 Gramophone Award)
- Julian Anderson: Book of Hours (NMC D121; 2007 Pizzicato Supersonic Award)
- Benjamin Britten: Britten on Film (NMC D112; 2008 MIDEM Classical Award)
- The NMC Songbook (NMC D150; 2009 Gramophone Award)
- Harrison Birtwistle: Night's Blackbird (NMC D156; 2011 Gramophone Award)
- Harrison Birtwistle: Night's Blackbird (NMC D156; 2012 BBC Music Magazine Award)
- Edward Elgar / Anthony Payne: Symphony No. 3 (NMC D053, Classic CD Award 1998)

Reissues, now available on NMC Ancora series, that have won awards on other labels:

- John Casken: Golem (NMC D113, Gramophone Award in 1991 (Virgin Classics))
- Harrison Birtwistle: Punch & Judy (NMC D138, Gramophone Award in 1980 (Decca Headline))
- Harrison Birtwistle: Gawain (NMC D200, Gramophone Award in 1996 (Collins Classics))
- Harrison Birtwistle: Secret Theatre (NMC D148, Gramophone Award in 1988 (Etcetera))
