= Endymion (ensemble) =

English chamber music ensemble

- Chamber music ensemble for contemporary music
- Endymion 1989 CD cover, Fazer Records / Finlandia
- Former name: Endymion Ensemble
- Founded: 1979
- Website: www.endymion.org.uk

Endymion, formerly Endymion Ensemble, is an English chamber music ensemble, founded in 1979 and dedicated to contemporary classical music.

== History ==
One of the founding members was John Whitfield who often conducted the group. Players have included pianist Michael Dussek, oboists Melinda Maxwell and Quentin Poole, clarinetist Mark van de Wiel, hornist Stephen Stirling and double bass player Chi-chi Nwanoku.

Whitfield conducted the ensemble in recordings dedicated to works by specific composers, including in 1988 Dumbarton Oaks, works by Igor Stravinsky, in 1989 Lichtbogen by Kaija Saariaho and other works by Finnish composers, and in 1995 Phaedra/Les Illuminations, music by Benjamin Britten.

In a series at the Southbank named Composer Choice, they have performed concerts dedicated to contemporary composers such as Michael Berkeley, Harrison Birtwistle, Gavin Bryars, Peter Maxwell Davies, Oliver Knussen, Mark-Anthony Turnage, Judith Weir and John Woolrich. Composer Jonathan Dove chose Mozart's Serenade for winds, K. 375. Stravinsky's Pastorale in the version for soprano and wind quartet, and his own Figures in the Garden, among others.

In 2004, Endymion recorded works for wind ensemble by Graham Waterhouse, including Mouvements d'Harmonie, on a CD Portrait featuring also chamber music for strings played by the English Chamber Orchestra. A review noted "All these pieces are superbly played by all concerned". In 2011, players performed at the Mahler Centenary Conference chamber music, including Mahler's Piano Quartet in the context of the Menuetto from his Third Symphony, Erich Korngold's Piano Trio, Op. 1, Shostakovich's Piano Trio No. 1 and Alfred Schnittke's Piano Quartet (after Mahler).

The ensemble often performs with the BBC Singers, conducted by David Hill. In 2013, they recorded for example Steve Reich's The Desert Music at Milton Court, London. They performed the work again at the Royal Albert Hall on 13 August 2014 at the Proms. Tim Ashley wrote in The Guardian: "The work requires vast resources of accuracy and stamina from its performers, all of whom rose superbly to its challenges."
