= Mark van de Wiel =

English clarinettist (born 1958)

Mark van de Wiel (born 1958, Northampton) is an English clarinettist, principal clarinettist of the Philharmonia Orchestra and the London Sinfonietta, and a teacher at the Royal Academy of Music.
