= Robin Maconie =

New Zealand composer, pianist, and writer

Robin John Maconie (born 22 October 1942) is a New Zealand composer, pianist, and writer.

Born in Auckland, New Zealand, Maconie studied with Frederick Page and Roger Savage at the Victoria University of Wellington, receiving a Master of Arts in the History and Literature of Music in 1964. He studied analysis with Olivier Messiaen in 1963–64 at the Paris Conservatoire, and in 1964–65 studied composition for film and radio under Bernd Alois Zimmermann, and electronic music under Herbert Eimert at the Cologne Conservatory. He also studied composition with Karlheinz Stockhausen, Henri Pousseur, and Luc Ferrari at the Second Cologne Courses for New Music at the Rheinische Musikschule, also in Cologne, as well as piano with Aloys Kontarsky, conducting with Herbert Schernus, and information science with Georg Heike.

Following a temporary lectureship at the University of Auckland, New Zealand, in 1967–69, Maconie emigrated to England to study for a Ph.D in the Psychology of Music at Southampton University. In 1974 Maconie was appointed lecturer in music and technology at the University of Surrey, where he continued until 1985. In 1997 he was appointed Professor of Performing Arts at the Savannah College of Art and Design in Georgia (U.S.). In 2002 he returned to New Zealand, where he lives in Dannevirke.

== Compositions (selective list) ==
- Epstein (film score), for flute, oboe, and bassoon (1960)
- Sonata, for clarinet and piano (1961)
- No Man Is an Island (film score), for speaker, solo voices, chorus, and horn (1961)
- Sound of Seeing (film score, A. Williams) (1962)
- Basia Memoranda (song cycle), voice and string quartet (1962)
- Canzona, for chamber orchestra (1962)
- Music for a Masque, for strings (1962)
- Six Easy Pieces, for piano (1962)
- Three Pieces, for cello (1962)
- Runaway (film score, John O'Shea film), (1963)
- Forbush and the Penguins (radio play) (1966)
- The First Wife, radio play, (1967)
- Maui (TV ballet, Maconie, after J. White: Ancient History of Maori), speaker, mime, 6 male dancers, and orchestra (1967–72, rev. 1986)
- Four-Part Invention, for piano (1963)
- A:B:A, for harp (1964)
- Ex evangelio Sancti Marci, for chorus (1964)
- A:D:C, for piano (1965)
- Solo, d, vc, (1965)
- Who will be the next statistic?, electronic music (1966)
- Sonata in Binary Form, for string quartet (1968)
- String Quartet (1970)
- Limina, modified soundtrack (1975)
- Prelude, for 2 amplified melody instruments (1976)
- Mozart-Kugel, round in 14 parts (1977)
- Pastoral, for violin (1977)
- Ricercar, for cello (1977)
- Commedia, for clarinet, violin, violoncello, and piano, with amplification (1979)
- Raku, for ensemble (1981)
- Touché, five movements for computer-generated sound (1983)
- Measures, computer-generated tape (1984)
- Night Porter’s Carol, for SATB choir (1991)
- 15 Songs for The Caucasian Chalk Circle (after Brecht) (2001)
- Lachrymae: Six Movements for String Orchestra (2005)
- Gold Fever, 21 songs from the gold rush era, for schools and amateurs (2007)

== Writings ==
- 1972. "Stockhausen's Mikrophonie I: Perception in Action." Perspectives of New Music 10, no. 2 (Spring–Summer): 92–101.
- 1972. "Stravinsky's Final Cadence", Tempo, New Series, no. 103:18–23.
- 1973. "Momente in London." Tempo, New Series, no. 104:32–33.
- 1974. "New Notations for the New Sounds." The Times Literary Supplement (21 June)
- 1974. "Stockhausen's Inori." Tempo, New Series, no. 111 (December): 32–33.
- 1976a. The Works of Karlheinz Stockhausen. London, New York, Toronto: Oxford University Press. ISBN 0-7145-2706-8. Second edition 1990. Oxford: Clarendon Press. ISBN 0-19-315477-3
- 1976b. "Harries' Proposed Notation for Visual Fine Art." Leonardo 9, no. 1 (Winter): 86–87.
- (ed.) 1979. The Young World of Early Music. Supplement to Early Music 7 no. 3 (July 1979). Oxford: Oxford University Press; New York: New York: Cumberlege.
- 1980. Tuning In. Script for BBC 1 Omnibus TV documentary on Karlheinz Stockhausen, directed by Barrie Gavin.
- (ed.) 1989. Stockhausen on Music: Lectures and Interviews London; New York: Marion Boyars. ISBN 0-7145-2887-0 . Paperbound 1991; new edition 2000. Korean edition 1995; Portuguese (Brazil) edition 2009; Chinese edition 2009.
- 1990. The Concept of Music. Oxford: Clarendon Press; New York: Oxford University Press. ISBN 0-19-816215-4. Spanish edition, as La música como concepto, translated by José Luis Gil Aristu. El Acantilado 154. Barcelona: Acantilado, 2007. ISBN 9788496834248.
- 1991. "Opera aperta." Canzona: The Official Yearbook of the Composers Association of New Zealand 14, no. 34:3–8.
- 1994. Hutchinson Pocket Dictionary of Classical Music. Oxford: Helicon Press. US edition 1997, Lincolnwood, Illinois: NTC Publishing Group
- 1997. The Science of Music. Oxford: Clarendon Press. ISBN 0-19-816648-6
- 1998a. "An Open Letter to New Zealand Composers." Canzona: The Official Yearbook of the Composers Association of New Zealand 19, no. 40:23–24.
- 1998b. "Stockhausen at 70: Through the Looking Glass." The Musical Times 139, no. 1863 (Summer): 4–11.
- 2002. The Second Sense: Language, Music, and Hearing. Lanham, Maryland: Scarecrow Press. ISBN 0-8108-4242-4
- 2004. "Message of Light: Goethe, Stockhausen and the New Enlightenment." Tempo 58, no. 230 (October): 2–8.
- 2005. Other Planets: The Music of Karlheinz Stockhausen. Lanham, Maryland; Toronto; Oxford: Scarecrow Press. ISBN 0-8108-5356-6.
- 2007. The Way of Music: Aural Training for the Internet Generation. Lanham, Maryland: Scarecrow Press.
- 2010. Musicologia: Musical Knowledge from Plato to John Cage. Lanham, Maryland: Scarecrow Press. ISBN 978-0-8108-7696-5.
- 2012. Avant Garde: An American Odyssey from Gertrude Stein to Pierre Boulez. Lanham, Maryland; Toronto; Plymouth (UK): Scarecrow Press. ISBN 978-0-8108-8312-3.
- 2013. Experiencing Stravinsky: A Listener's Companion. Lanham, Maryland, Toronto, Plymouth, UK: Scarecrow Press. ISBN 978-0-8108-8430-4 (cloth); ISBN 978-0-8108-8431-1 (ebook).
- 2016. Other Planets: The Complete Works of Karlheinz Stockhausen 1950–2007, updated edition. Lanham, Maryland, and London: Rowman & Littlefield. ISBN 978-1-4422-7267-5.
