= Tempo (journal) =

Peer-reviewed academic journal on music

- Discipline: Music
- Language: English
- Edited by: Christopher Fox and Ed Cooper

Publication details
- History: 1939–present
- Publisher: Cambridge University Press
- Frequency: 4/year

Standard abbreviations
- ISO 4: Tempo

Indexing
- ISSN: 0040-2982 (print); 1478-2286 (web)
- JSTOR: tempo

Links
- Journal homepage

Tempo is a quarterly academic journal that specialises in music of the 20th and 21st centuries, broadly encompassing what is often referred to as contemporary music and New Music. It was established in 1939 as the 'house magazine' of the music publisher Boosey & Hawkes. Tempo was the brain-child of Arnold Schoenberg's pupil Erwin Stein, who worked for Boosey & Hawkes as a music editor.

The journal's first editor was Ernest Chapman and it was intended to be a bi-monthly publication. Issues 1 to 4 appeared from January to July 1939; but owing to the outbreak of World War II there was a hiatus in publication until August 1941, when issue 5 appeared, and another until February 1944, when regular publication resumed with issue 6 on a roughly quarterly basis. Meanwhile, the New York City office of Boosey & Hawkes set up a separate American edition which produced six issues in 1940–1942 (numbered 1–6, independent of the UK numbering) and an unnumbered 'wartime edition' in February 1944.

In 1946, the journal was enlarged and redesigned and began a new numbering: Issues 1 and 2 of the New Series were notionally issues 16 and 17 of the Old Series, but thereafter dual numbering was dropped.

From the 1950s, Tempo began to cover a wider range of music than that published by Boosey. Past editors-in-chief include Anthony Gishford, Donald Mitchell, Colin Mason, and David Drew. Beginning in the early 1980s, the journal was edited by Malcolm MacDonald under his journalistic alias of Calum MacDonald. MacDonald handled the transition in publisher from Boosey & Hawkes to Cambridge University Press. Following his retirement in January 2014, the editor became Bob Gilmore. Since 2015, the editor has been Christopher Fox.

Between 2003 and 2025, the journal was published by Cambridge University Press. In September 2025, Ed Cooper was appointed Co-Editor. From January 2026 Tempo will be published by Wolke Verlag.
