= List of British classical composers =

The following is a list of those born in Britain or of British citizenship who have worked in the classical music tradition.

== A ==
- Richard Addinsell (1904–1977)
- John Addison (1765–1844)
- Thomas Adès (born 1971)
- Emanuel Abraham Aguilar (1824–1904)
- Kenneth J. Alford (1881–1945)
- William Alwyn (1905–1965)
- Geoffrey Alvarez (born 1961)
- Julian Anderson (born 1967)
- Kerry Andrew (born 1978)
- Denis ApIvor (1916–2004)
- Anna Appleby (born 1993)
- Malcolm Archer (born 1952)
- Lucy Armstrong (born 1991)
- Thomas Arne (1710–1778)
- Richard Arnell (1917–2009)
- Malcolm Arnold (1921–2006)
- Algernon Ashton (1859–1937)
- Ivor Atkins (1869–1963)
- Frederic Austin (1872–1952)
- Charles Avison (1709–1770)

== B ==
- William Babell (c. 1690–1723)
- Francis Edward Bache (1833–1858)
- Francis Baines (1917–1999)
- William Baines (1899–1922)
- Edgar Bainton (1880–1956)
- Edward Bairstow (1874–1946)
- Christopher Ball (born 1936)
- Granville Bantock (1868–1946)
- Richard Barrett (born 1959)
- Stanley Bate (1911–1959)
- Hubert Bath (1883–1945)
- Arnold Bax (1883–1953)
- Sally Beamish (born 1956)
- David Bedford (1937–2011)
- Luke Bedford (born 1978)
- Arthur Benjamin (1893–1960)
- George Benjamin (born 1960)
- Richard Rodney Bennett (1936–2012)
- William Sterndale Bennett (1816–1875)
- Lennox Berkeley (1903–1989)
- Michael Berkeley (born 1948)
- Lord Berners (1883–1950)
- Ronald Binge (1910–1979)
- Judith Bingham (born 1952)
- Harrison Birtwistle (1934-2022)
- Henry Bishop (1787–1856)
- Arthur Bliss (1891–1975)
- John Blow (1649–1708)
- Carey Blyton (1932–2002)
- Capel Bond (1730–1790)
- Nimrod Borenstein (born 1969)
- Rutland Boughton (1878–1960)
- Derek Bourgeois (1941-2017)
- York Bowen (1884–1961)
- William Boyce (1711–1779)
- Charlotte Bray (born 1982)
- Havergal Brian (1876–1972)
- Frank Bridge (1879–1941)
- Reginald Smith Brindle (1917–2003)
- Benjamin Britten (1913–1976)
- Nigel Brooks (born 1936)
- David Bruce (born 1970)
- Gavin Bryars (born 1943)
- John Bull (1562 or 1563–1628)
- Geoffrey Burgon (1941–2010)
- Diana Burrell (born 1948)
- Alan Bush (1900–1995)
- Geoffrey Bush (1920–1998)
- Arthur Butterworth (1923–2014)
- George Butterworth (1885–1916)
- William Byrd (c. 1539 or 1543–1623)

== C ==
- Thomas Campion (1567–1620)
- Alexander Campkin (born 1984)
- Philip Cannon (1929–2016)
- Gary Carpenter (born 1951)
- Cornelius Cardew (1936–1981)
- Doreen Carwithen (1922–2003)
- Robert Carver (c. 1485 – c. 1570)
- John Casken (born 1949)
- Ronald Center (1913–1973)
- Bob Chilcott (born 1955)
- Jeremiah Clarke (c. 1674–1707)
- Nigel Clarke (born 1960)
- Rebecca Helferich Clarke (1886–1979)
- Frederic Cliffe (1857–1931)
- Hubert Clifford (1904–1959)
- Anna Clyne (born 1980)
- Eric Coates (1886–1957)
- Leon Coates (1937–2023)
- Julian Cochran (born 1974)
- Roger Sacheverell Coke (1912–1972)
- Avril Coleridge-Taylor (1903–1998)
- Samuel Coleridge-Taylor (1875–1912)
- Justin Connolly (1933–2020)
- Arnold Cooke (1906–2005)
- Benjamin Cooke (1734–1793)
- Deryck Cooke (1919–1976)
- Frank Corcoran (born 1937)
- Frederic Hymen Cowen (1852–1935)
- Harold Craxton (1885–1971)
- Guirne Creith (1907–1996)
- William Croft (1678–1727)
- Gordon Crosse (1937–2021)
- Peter Crossley-Holland (1916–2001)
- William Crotch (1775–1847)
- Joe Cutler (born 1968)
- Francis Cutting (c. 1550–1595/1596)

== D ==
- Benjamin Dale (1885–1943)
- Christian Darnton (1905–1981)
- Peter Maxwell Davies (1934–2016)
- Tansy Davies (born 1973)
- Walford Davies (1869–1941)
- Frederick Delius (1862–1934)
- James Dillon (born 1950)
- Stephen Dodgson (1924–2013)
- James Douglas (born 1932)
- Roy Douglas (1907–2015)
- Jonathan Dove (born 1959)
- John Dowland (1563–1626)
- Andrew Downes (born 1950)
- Patrick Doyle (born 1953)
- Paul Drayton (born 1944)
- Thomas Dunhill (1877–1946)
- John Dunstable (c. 1390–1453)
- George Dyson (1883–1964)

== E ==
- Henry Eccles, also Henri (1670–1742)
- Edward Elgar (1857–1934)
- Rosalind Ellicott (1857–1924)
- Brian Eno (born 1948)
- Thomas Erskine, 6th Earl of Kellie (1732–1781)

== F ==
- David Fanshawe (1942–2010)
- Giles Farnaby (c. 1563–1640)
- Robert Fayrfax (1464–1521)
- Eric Fenby (1906–1997)
- Howard Ferguson (1908–1999)
- Brian Ferneyhough (born 1943)
- Alexis Ffrench (born 1970)
- Michael Finnissy (born 1946)
- Gerald Finzi (1901–1956)
- Arthur Elwell Fisher (1848–1912)
- Graham Fitkin (born 1963)
- Eliza Flower (1803–1846)
- Cecil Forsyth (1870–1941)
- Christopher Fox (born 1955)
- Cheryl Frances-Hoad (born 1980)
- Benjamin Frankel (1906–1973)
- Peter Racine Fricker (1920–1990)
- John Foulds (1880–1939)

== G ==
- Hans Gál (1890–1987)
- Henry Balfour Gardiner (1877–1950)
- William Gardiner (1770–1853)
- John Gardner (1917–2011)
- Edward German (1862–1936)
- Jack Gibbons (born 1962)
- Orlando Gibbons (1583–1625)
- Armstrong Gibbs (1889–1960)
- Anthony Gilbert (born 1934)
- Ruth Gipps (1921–1999)
- Andrew Glover-Whitley (born 1962)
- Alexander Goehr (1932–2024)
- Berthold Goldschmidt (1903–1996)
- Jonathan Goldstein (1968–2019)
- Eugene Aynsley Goossens (1893–1962)
- Barry Gray (1908–1984)
- Jonny Greenwood (born 1971)
- Edward Gregson (born 1945)
- Ivor Gurney (1890–1937)

== H ==
- Patrick Hadley (1899–1973)
- Emily Hall (born 1978)
- Richard Hall (1903–1982)
- Iain Hamilton (1922–2000)
- George Frideric Handel (1685–1759)
- Richard Harris (born 1968)
- Hamilton Harty (1879–1941)
- Basil Harwood (1859–1949)
- Patrick Hawes (born 1958)
- Michael Head (1900–1976)
- Christopher Headington (1930–1996)
- Anthony Hedges (1931–2019)
- Victor Hely-Hutchinson (1901–1947)
- Muriel Emily Herbert (1897–1984)
- William Herschel (1738–1822)
- Kenneth Hesketh (born 1968)
- Alistair Hinton (born 1950)
- Christopher Hobbs (born 1950)
- Alun Hoddinott (1929–2008)
- Joseph Holbrooke (1878–1958)
- Alfred Hollins (1865–1942)
- Robin Holloway (born 1943)
- Derek Holman (1931–2019)
- Gustav Holst (1874–1934)
- Imogen Holst (1907–1984)
- Simon Holt (born 1958)
- James Hook (1746–1827)
- Bill Hopkins (1943–1981)
- David Horne (born 1970)
- Joseph Horovitz (born 1926)
- Dorothy Howell (1898–1982)
- Herbert Howells (1892–1983)
- Dani Howard (born 1993)
- Emily Howard (born 1979)
- Vic Hoyland (born 1945)
- Spike Hughes (1908–1987)
- Michael Hurd (1928–2006)
- William Hurlstone (1876–1906)

== I ==
- John Ireland (1879–1962)

== J ==
- Gordon Jacob (1895–1984)
- Philip Jeck (born 1952)
- Rupert Jeffcoat (born 1970)
- Karl Jenkins (born 1944)
- Daniel Jones (1912–1993)
- Wilfred Josephs (1927–1997)
- John Joubert (1927–2019)

== K ==
- Lydia Kakabadse (born 1955)
- Minna Keal (1909–1999)
- Albert Ketèlbey (1875–1959)
- George Kiallmark (1781–1835)
- Oliver Knussen (1952–2018)

== L ==
- Constant Lambert (1905–1951)
- Frederic Lamond (1868–1948)
- Philip Lane (born 1950)
- Walter Leigh (1905–1942)
- Kenneth Leighton (1929–1988)
- Thomas Linley the elder (1733–1795)
- Thomas Linley the younger (1756–1778)
- Malcolm Lipkin (1932–2017)
- George Lloyd (1913–1998)
- William Lloyd Webber (1914–1982)
- Jon Lord (1941–2012)
- Elisabeth Lutyens (1906–1983)

== M ==
- Hamish MacCunn (1868–1916)
- Malcolm MacDonald (1916–1992)
- Emma Maria Macfarren (1824–1895), pseudonym Jules Brissac
- George Alexander Macfarren (1813–1887)
- Walter Cecil Macfarren (1826–1905)
- Alexander Mackenzie (1847–1905)
- James MacMillan (born 1959)
- Elizabeth Maconchy (1907–1994)
- John Marsh (1752–1828)
- Roger Marsh (born 1949)
- Carlo Martelli (born 1935)
- George William Martin (1828–1881)
- Steve Martland (1954–2013)
- Benedict Mason (born 1954)
- Grace-Evangeline Mason (born 1994)
- William Mathias (1934–1992)
- Colin Matthews (born 1946)
- David Matthews (born 1943)
- Nicholas Maw (1935–2009)
- Billy Mayerl (1902–1959)
- Rita McAllister (born 1946)
- John McCabe (1939–2015)
- Cecilia McDowall (born 1951)
- John Blackwood McEwen (1868–1948)
- William McGibbon (1690–1756)
- Edward McGuire (born 1948)
- Donna McKevitt (born 1970)
- John McLeod (born 1934)
- Luigi Merci (c. 1695 – c. 1750)
- Anna Meredith (born 1978)
- Robin Milford (1903–1959)
- Silvina Milstein (born 1956)
- Ernest John Moeran (1894–1950)
- Dominic Muldowney (born 1952)
- William Mundy (c. 1529–1591)
- Thea Musgrave (born 1928)

== N ==
- Isaac Nathan (c. 1791–1864)
- George Nicholson (born 1949)
- Ivor Novello (1893–1951)
- Patrick Nunn (born 1969)
- Michael Nyman (born 1944)

== O ==
- Norman O'Neill (1875–1934)
- Buxton Orr (1924–1997)
- Robin Orr (1909–2006)
- Albert Alan Owen (born 1948)
- Janet Owen Thomas (1961–2002)

== P ==
- Roxanna Panufnik (born 1968)
- Clifton Parker (1905–1989)
- Hubert Parry (1848–1918)
- Paul Patterson (born 1947)
- Harry Parr-Davies (1914–1955)
- Ian Parrott (1916–2012)
- Michael Parsons (born 1938)
- Anthony Payne (1936–2021)
- Martin Peerson (1571/1573–1650/1651)
- David Pentecost (born 1940)
- Norman Peterkin (1886–1982)
- Polo Piatti (born 1954)
- George Frederick Pinto (1785–1806)
- Thomas Pitfield (1903–1999)
- Jocelyn Pook (born 1960)
- Cipriani Potter (1792–1871)
- Leonel Power (1370/1385–1445)
- Alwynne Pritchard (born 1968)
- Gwyn Pritchard (born 1948)
- Charles Proctor (1905–1996)
- Henry Purcell (1659–1695)

== Q ==
- Roger Quilter (1877–1953)

== R ==
- Simon Rackham (born 1964)
- Bernard Rands (born 1934)
- Alan Rawsthorne (1905–1971)
- Alan Richardson (1904–1978)
- Max Richter (born 1966)
- Alan Ridout (1934–1996)
- Mervyn Roberts (1906–19960)
- Betty Roe (born 1930)
- Cyril Rootham (1875–1938)
- Edmund Rubbra (1901–1986)
- John Rutter (born 1945)

== S ==
- Malcolm Sargent (1895–1967)
- Lionel Sainsbury (born 1958)
- Leonard Salzedo (1921–2000)
- Rhian Samuel (born 1944)
- Kevin Sargent (living)
- Rebecca Saunders (born 1967)
- Sinan Savaskan (born 1954)
- David Sawer (born 1961)
- Robert Saxton (born 1953)
- Cyril Scott (1879–1970)
- Francis George Scott (1880–1958)
- Marion Scott (1877–1953)
- Peter Seabourne (born 1960)
- Humphrey Searle (1915–1982)
- Mátyás Seiber (1905–1960)
- Martin Shaw (1875–1958)
- John Sheppard (c. 1515–1558)
- Hugh Shrapnel (born 1947)
- Obadiah Shuttleworth (died 1734)
- Sasha Siem (born 1984)
- Mark Simpson (born 1988)
- Robert Simpson (1921–1997)
- Howard Skempton (born 1947)
- William Smethergell (1751–1836)
- Alice Mary Smith (1839–1884)
- Dave Smith (born 1949)
- Ethel Smyth (1858–1944)
- John Stafford Smith (1750–1836)
- Naresh Sohal (1939–2018)
- Arthur Somervell (1863–1937)
- Philip Sparke (born 1951)
- Kaikhosru Shapurji Sorabji (1892–1988)
- Patric Standford (1939–2014)
- Charles Villiers Stanford (1852–1924)
- John Stanley (1712–1786)
- Christopher Steel (1938 or 1939–1991 or 1992)
- Bernard Stevens (1916–1983)
- James Stevens (1892–1971)
- Haldane Stewart (1868–1942)
- Robert Prescott Stewart (1825–1894)
- Richard Stoker (1938–2021)
- Martin Suckling (born 1981)
- Arthur Sullivan (1842–1900)

== T ==
- Joby Talbot (born 1971)
- Thomas Tallis (c. 1505–1585)
- Phyllis Tate (1911–1987)
- John Tavener (1944–2013)
- John Taverner (c. 1490–1545)
- Mansel Thomas (1909–1986)
- Shirley Thompson (born 1958)
- Michael Tippett (1905–1998)
- Will Todd (born 1970)
- Thomas Tomkins (1572–1656)
- Ernest Tomlinson (1924–2015)
- Paolo Tosti (1846–1916)
- Donald Tovey (1875–1940)
- Harold Truscott (1914–1992)
- Mark-Anthony Turnage (born 1960)

== V ==
- Robert Valentine (c. 1671–1747)
- Ralph Vaughan Williams (1872–1958)
- John Veale (1922–2006)
- Ian Venables (born 1955)

== W ==
- Julian Wagstaff (born 1970)
- William Wallace (1860–1940)
- Errollyn Wallen (born 1958)
- William Walton (1902–1983)
- John Ward (1590–1638)
- Peter Warlock (1894–1930)
- Thomas Weelkes (1576–1623)
- Judith Weir (born 1954)
- Samuel Wesley (1766–1837)
- Samuel Sebastian Wesley (1810–1876)
- Douglas Weiland (born 1954)
- Janet Wheeler (born 1957)
- John White (born 1936)
- Percy Whitlock (1903–1946)
- Grace Williams (1906–1977)
- James Wilson (1922–2005)
- Thomas Wilson (1927–2001)
- Beth Wiseman (1951–2007)
- Stevie Wishart (living)
- Charles Wood (1866–1926)
- Hugh Wood (1932–2021)
- John Wooldridge (1919–1958)
- John Woolrich (born 1954)
- William Wordsworth (1908–1988)
- David Wright (born 1953)
- David Wynne (1900–1983)

== See also ==
- Chronological list of English classical composers
