= Strugnell =

Strugnell as a surname may refer to:

- Louisa Briggs (née Strugnell) (1818 or 1836- 1925), Aboriginal Australian rights activist, dormitory matron, midwife and nurse
- John Strugnell (1930–2007), British scholar who worked on the Dead Sea Scrolls
- Dan Strugnell (born 1992), British footballer
- William Strugnell (1892–1977), British World War I flying ace
- the fictional Jake/Jason Strugnell, a poet from Tulse Hill, a persona employed by the poet Wendy Cope in her collection Making Cocoa for Kingsley Amis (1986), and author of Strugnell's Haiku.
