= Janet Owen Thomas =

British composer and organist (1961–2002)

For the Australian mathematician and educator, see Janet Thomas.

Janet Owen Thomas (29 January 1961 – 5 June 2002) was a British composer and organist.

== Early life and education ==
Owen Thomas was born on Merseyside to parents of Welsh and German heritage. She attended Merchant Taylors' Girls School In Liverpool and St Hugh's College, Oxford, where her teachers included the prominent organist James Dalton and the composer Robert Saxton. She received a scholarship to travel to Hamburg, where she briefly studied with composer György Ligeti, whose organ music she later wrote an article about. The period in Hamburg led to Owen Thomas being commissioned by Johannes Geffert to write the solo organ piece Rosaces (1984), which was subsequently widely performed and published by Novello.

== Return to England and career ==
Returning to England, Owen Thomas worked as a composer, organist and teacher during the 1980s. In 1988, she was commissioned to write a new work to celebrate the opening of the Tate Gallery, Liverpool, New and Better Days, a setting of words from the Book of Isaiah and by Boris Pasternak, for choir, organ and trumpet.

The success of this work encouraged her to focus her energies on composition, while she briefly reentered education, enrolling for a course in 1990 in Music technology at the University of York, where she also explored her interests in algorithmic composition, fractals and astronomy, a fascination developed during a visit to India. It was during this time that she wrote a music theatre piece, The Condom Tester's Lament, for speaker and electronics. She went on to take advanced composition studies with Anthony Gilbert at the Royal Northern College of Music.

In 1991, the BBC Proms presented the UK premiere of Rosaces. Owen Thomas was the youngest composer whose music was featured in that year's festival, and the work went on to be played in over a dozen countries.

She lived and worked in York during the 1990s, where she continued to compose and teach at The Minster School, York, and at the Department of Music at the University of Huddersfield, while ill health increasingly prevented her from performing.

Her literary inspirations included the works of Verlaine, Gerard Manley-Hopkins, Wendy Cope and Dylan Thomas, all of whose words she set to music. She intended to complete an operatic setting of Racine's play Phèdre, but was unable to begin work on this before her death.

Her music was commissioned and performed by ensembles including the Goldberg Ensemble, the Allegri String Quartet, the Bingham String Quartet, Gemini, Lontano, and Boccherini String Trio, the soprano Mary Wiegold and organist Kevin Bowyer.

Her largest work was Under the Skin (1999), a large ensemble work commissioned by the BBC for the Huddersfield Contemporary Music Festival, including the words of Dylan Thomas' poem "Do not go gentle into that good night" and utilising the theme of the plainchant hymn Dies irae. It was recorded and broadcast a few days later on BBC Radio 3's Hear And Now.

== Style ==
In her obituary for Owen Thomas, fellow composer Nicola LeFanu described the former's musical style as follows:

The hallmark of her style is linear counterpoint; the music is carefully constructed to allow for self-similarity in its proportions, both in the large and in the detail. In speaking of her work, Thomas acknowledged the influence of the 17th-and 18th-century music which she played so much in her days as an organist. Her contrapuntal textures are transformed, though, by the "shimmer and glitter" which she loved.

== Death ==
Owen Thomas died of cancer at the age of 41. At the time, she was working on a concertante work for organ, left unfinished. In the obituary published by The Times, it was said of her death that "contemporary British music has lost one of its most promising creative talents... her reputation will rest on a mere handful of fastidiously crafted works mainly for voice and chamber ensemble".

Most of her published works were published in her lifetime by Giles Easterbrook's labels Prima Facie and Maecenas Music; the rights to these works were sold to Edition Peters in 2008. The exception is her work Rosaces, whose rights are held by Novello.

== Significant works ==
- Rosaces (1984) for solo organ.
- Watermark (1986) for winds and piano, commissioned by the Mill House Festival, Aynho.
- New and Better Days (1988) for SATB choir, trumpet and organ, commissioned for the opening of Tate Liverpool.
- Cantus (1992) for 11 solo strings, commissioned by Bang on a Can and subsequently broadcast on BBC Radio 3.
- Trio Del Cantus (1994) for string trio, commissioned by the Park Lane Group.
- Fiori musicali (1997) commissioned and recorded by the Bingham String Quartet.
- Under the Skin (1999) commissioned by the BBC for the Huddersfield Contemporary Music Festival.
