= Winifred Smith (musician) =

British organist and music teacher from Huddersfield, Yorkshire (1911–2004)

Winifred Smith (1911 – 21 June, 2004) was a British organist and music teacher, closely associated with Huddersfield in Yorkshire, where she lived and worked all her life.

Smith grew up in Lindley, a suburb of Huddersfield, and studied music at Huddersfield Technical College. She subsequently gained a Bachelor of Music degree at Durham University, a Licentiate of the Royal Academy of Music and an Associate and Fellow of the Royal College of Organists.

Smith's first professional appointment was as deputy organist of the Wesley Methodist Church in her home town of Lindley. In 1935, she became organist at Gledholt Methodist Church in Huddersfield before being appointed organist of Bethesda Methodist Church at Elland in 1938. During this time she continued her organ studies with Reginald Tustin Baker, organist at Sheffield Cathedral and with Sir Edward Bairstow while he was master of choristers at York Minster.

She played the organ at St Paul's Church in Huddersfield during the 1940s and early 50s. In 1956 she became organist at Kirkheaton Parish Church, where she organised the choir for 14 years.

Smith began teaching music at Huddersfield's Royds Hall High School (later Grammar School) in 1948. In 1955 she became a lecturer at Huddersfield College of Technology, eventually becoming head of music. Her pupils included composer Richard Stoker (whose Three Improvisations for Organ are dedicated to her), the conductor Peter Seymour, and Philip Wood, who founded the organ building firm Wood of Huddersfield in 1968. Her recital programmes could be adventurous. At a 1969 concert using the new chamber orchestra at the College's chapel she played Bruhns, Stanley, Sweelink and Paul Hindemith's Organ Sonata No. 2.

In the 1950s she was living in Trinity Street. She continued to live in Huddersfield until 1999, then moving to a residential home in New Mill. She died, aged 93, in Newsome.
