= Simon Rackham =

English composer and artist

Simon Rackham (born 1964) is an English composer and artist. He is probably best known for his work;‘Which ever way your nose bends’ the first commission by the six piano ensemble Piano Circus, composed as a companion piece to Steve Reich’s ‘Six Pianos’ & released on their eponymous album by Argo Records (UK) in 1992.

== Early life ==
From 1983-1988, he studied composition and French horn at the Royal Academy of Music (London).

== Career ==
In the late eighties he co-founded the group ‘3 or 4 composers’ (with Laurence Crane, Helen Ottaway, Melanie Pappenheim and Jocelyn Pook). He has released over ninety albums (mainly music for piano) through CD Baby, recorded using Finale (software) to write the score and then 'Pianissimo' virtual piano software for the performance. In 2012 his authorized arrangement for solo piano of Steve Reich's ‘Clapping Music’ was released on the album Which way is up?.

== Musical work ==
His music is broadly described as postminimalist or minimalist, influenced by Terry Riley, Philip Glass et al. Another important influence was the work of the so-called English experimental composers such as Howard Skempton, Michael Parsons and Christopher Hobbs and his association with Laurence Crane and Graham Fitkin. Many of his works have a conceptual basis, or work through various processes as in Systems music.

Rackham's works are mainly composed within a Diatonic scale. Tempo and dynamics (music) generally remain constant throughout the entirety of a piece.

Various albums containing longer pieces ('Harmonium Music', 'Man Made Music', 'Slow Motion Music', 'Audiophilia', 'Triadic Variations' etc.) could be described as Ambient. A series of works dealing with fundamental aspects of music; 'Tune', 'Harmony', 'Rhythm' & 'Sixty Minutes' (which is primarily concerned with time) were released in the 2010s. His music has been used by dance companies and he has composed incidental music for plays including the first British production of The Man Outside by Wolfgang Borchert. He performed in the original production of Tony Harrison's The Trackers of Oxyrhynchus in Greece and at the Royal National Theatre London.

== Visual art ==
Rackham's work has been exhibited in the UK, the Netherlands and Italy. He has produced a large and diverse body of work, switching between more conventional painting and sculpture (including ceramics) and more conceptual art including Artist's books. Some of his text-based work was exhibited through Tanya Peixoto's bookartbookshop (London) in 2002, in an exhibition called In Black and White. He has produced photographic and video works.
