= Lyrita =

British classical music record label

Lyrita Recorded Edition
- Founded: 1958
- Founder: Richard Itter
- Distributor: Nimbus Records
- Genre: Classical
- Country of origin: U.K.
- Official website: www.lyrita.co.uk

Lyrita is a British classical music record label, specializing in the works of British composers.

Lyrita began releasing LPs in October 1959 as Lyrita Recorded Edition for sale by mail order subscription. The founder of the company, Richard Itter (5 April 1928 – 1 March 2014) of Burnham, Buckinghamshire, was a businessman and record collector. Having heard many poor records, he determined to make only good ones.

Lyrita concentrated on the work of United Kingdom composers. At first, this consisted of the piano music of Arnold Bax, Gordon Jacob, E.J. Moeran, and Michael Tippett amongst others. The earliest recordings were made in the music room of Itter's home. Itter was responsible for the engineering, production, and editing of the recordings. If he managed to sell 100 copies Itter would have been able to break even. RCS.2 was the first catalog number, and Gordon Jacob wrote a composition specifically for this album, "Elegy for Piano and Cello", to fill out the program on the disc.

In time, the bulk of Lyrita's catalogue became orchestral and symphonic works, including otherwise-neglected composers at that time, including William Alwyn, Malcolm Arnold, Arnold Bax, Havergal Brian, Frank Bridge, Arnold Cooke, Gerald Finzi, John Foulds, George Lloyd, Edmund Rubbra, Humphrey Searle and Cyril Rootham. Many Lyrita LPs became regarded as demonstration discs, suitable for showcasing the sonic qualities of high-end hi-fi equipment. Nearly all of Lyrita's recordings were produced by Decca Records and pressed by either Decca or Nimbus Records. When Decca joined PolyGram in 1980, the relationship with Lyrita ended.

The only non-British music to be recorded and issued on Lyrita was Brazilian piano music performed by Elizabeth Powell on RCS.22. Works by Paul Hindemith, Edward MacDowell, and Francis Poulenc were also recorded but not issued.

Lyrita issued monaural records in the RCS series, and stereophonic records in the SRCS series beginning at SRCS.31 (which corresponded with monaural RCS.31). The stereo series ran to SRCS.131. Lyrita issues compact discs (CDs) in the SRCD series beginning with SRCD.200 and running through SRCD.332.

Lyrita's stereophonic LPs from the SRCS series were also issued in the U.S. by the Musical Heritage Society (1972–1977) and HNH (1978–1979). Lyrita began exporting their records to the U.S. in 1980. The first digital productions were made in June 1982, and LP production was discontinued in 1988.

In 1990 Lyrita began issuing CDs featuring a small selection of their back catalogue, a few newly recorded items, and recordings licensed from other sources. There was a 15-year hiatus during which attempts were made to persuade Itter to release the rest of the catalogue on CD.

In summer 2006 Wyastone Estate Ltd (proprietors of Nimbus Records) reached an agreement with Richard Itter to distribute the company's entire catalogue over an 18-month period. The first discs to appear would be those CD transfers which appeared in the 1990s; the remaining original analogue masters would subsequently be digitized and transferred to CD, making all of Lyrita's recordings available on CD for the first time.

In 2014 agreement was reached with the BBC to commercially release the private archive Itter had made at home using professional recording equipment of music otherwise lost due to Musicians' Union (UK) regulations requiring the BBC not to keep copies.

== See also ==
- Lists of record labels
