= List of mathematical science schools in Australia =

This article lists universities in Australia that offer higher education study options in the mathematical sciences at the undergraduate and postgraduate level. 34 Australian universities currently offer higher education study options in the mathematical sciences. Of the 39 members of Universities Australia, only four do not offer mathematical science qualifications: Charles Darwin University, Central Queensland University, Southern Cross University (although it does offer mathematics education degrees), and Victoria University (does offer qualifications in mathematics education). Students can also study some mathematical science courses online via the ACE Network of the Australian Mathematical Sciences Institute.

== Table ==
Mathematical science schools in Australia
University	Locations	Degrees
Australian Catholic University	Brisbane, Melbourne and Sydney.	Applied and pure mathematics, and statistics: BA, BA (Hons), MPhil and PhD.
Australian National University	Canberra	Applied and pure mathematics, bioinformatics, and actuarial science: BMathSc, BMathSc (Hons), MMathSc (Adv), MSc(MathSc), MPhil, PhD and DSc. Statistics: MStatDAn and MStat.
Bond University	Gold Coast	Actuarial science: BActSc (Hons), MActPrac and MActSc. Data analytics: BBusDAnal, GCertDAnal and MBusDAnal. Both disciplines: MPhil and PhD.
Charles Sturt University	Online	Applied mathematics and statistics: GCertMath and GDipMath.
Curtin University	Perth and Singapore	Applied mathematics, statistics and data science: BSc, BSc (Hons), MSc, MRes, MPhil and PhD.
Deakin University	Geelong, Melbourne and online	Applied mathematics: BSc (Note: Not offered online) and BSc (Hons). Data science: BDSc, BDSc (Hons), GCertDAn, GDipDSc, MDSc (Note: Not offered in Geelong) and MDSc (Prof) .
Edith Cowan University	Perth and online	Applied mathematics and statistics: (Note: These qualifications are only offered in person at Perth) BSc, BSc (Hons) and PhD. Data science: MDSc. Bioinformatics: MBioInf. Applied mathematics, bioinformatics, statistics and data science: MScRes.
Federation University	Ballarat, Churchill and Melbourne.	Applied mathematics: BSc, BSc (Adv), BSc (Hons), GDipDSc, MDSc, MMathSc, (Note: Master's degree by research.) PhD and DSc.
Flinders University	Adelaide and online	Applied mathematics, statistics and data science: BMathSc, BMathSc (Hons), MSc, MScRes, PhD and DSc.
Griffith University	Brisbane and the Gold Coast	Applied mathematics and data science: DipAppSc, BSc and BSc (Hons). Applied mathematics only: BAdvSc (Hons) and MSc.
James Cook University	Cairns, Singapore, Townsville and online.	Data science: BSc, BSc (Hons), BAdvSc, (Note: Not available in Singapore) and MDSc. (Note: Only offered online) Applied mathematics and statistics: BSc, (Note: Only offered in Townsville) BSc (Hons), and BAdvSc.
La Trobe University	Bendigo, Melbourne and online	Applied mathematics, data science and statistics: BSc, BSc (Hons), MDSc, (Note: Not available in Bendigo.) MSc, MAppScRes, MPhil, PhD and DSc.
Macquarie University	Sydney	Applied mathematics, statistics and data science: BSc, MRes, MPhil and PhD.
Monash University	Melbourne	Applied and pure mathematics, actuarial science and mathematical statistics: BSc and BSc (Hons). Applied and pure mathematics, and statistics: MMath. Financial mathematics: MFinMath. All these fields: MPhil, PhD and DSc.
Murdoch University	Perth and external	Applied mathematics and statistics: BSc and BSc (Hons). Data science: GDipAIDSc (Note: External study not available) and MSc. Applied mathematics: MPhil and PhD.
Queensland University of Technology	Brisbane and online	Applied mathematics and statistics: BMath and BMath (Hons). Data analytics/science: BDSc, Graduate Certificate in Data Analytics and MDAn. Applied mathematics, statistics and data science: MPhil and PhD.
RMIT University	Melbourne and online	Applied mathematics, statistics and data science: BAppMathStat, BDSc, BSc (Hons), GCertAn, GCertDSc, MAn, MDSc, MStatOpRes, MSc and PhD.
Swinburne University of Technology	Melbourne	Applied mathematics: DipSc, BSc, BSc (Prof), BSc (Hons) and MRes.
University of Adelaide	Adelaide	Applied and pure mathematics, and statistics: BMathSc, BMathSc (Adv), MMathSc, MPhil and PhD.
University of Canberra	Canberra	Applied mathematics: BSc. (Note: Most recently available information on this degree programme comes from 2021. It is possible it has been discontinued.)
University of Melbourne	Melbourne	Applied and pure mathematics, mathematical physics, data science and statistics: BSc, BScExt, GCertSc, (Note: Does not cover data science nor mathematical physics.) GDipSc and MDSc. (Note: Only covers data science) Bioinformatics: MSc. All these fields: MPhil, PhD and DSc.
University of Newcastle	Newcastle and online	Applied mathematics and statistics: BMath, BMathAdv and BMath (Hons). Data science: MDSc.
University of New England	Armidale and online	Applied and pure mathematics, data sciences and statistics: BSc, BSc (Hons), MSc, MScSt, PhD and DSc.
University of New South Wales	Canberra, Sydney and online	Applied and pure mathematics, and statistics: BSc, BSc (Hons), BAdvSc (Hons), (Note: Not offered in Canberra) GCertMathStat, GDipMathStat, MMath, MRes and PhD. Financial mathematics: MFinMath. Data science: BDScD, BDScD (Hons), GCertDSc, GCertDScD, GDipDSc, GDipDScD, MDSc, MDScD, MRes and PhD.
University of Notre Dame Australia	Fremantle and Sydney	Applied mathematics and statistics: UndCertMath. Data analytics: DipDAn.
University of Queensland	Brisbane	Data science: MDSc. Applied and pure mathematics, data analytics, mathematical physics, bioinformatics and statistics: BMath, and BMath (Hons). Applied and pure mathematics, and statistics: MSc. Any mathematical science: MPhil, PhD and DSc.
University of South Australia	Adelaide and online	Applied mathematics: BMath and BAppSc (Hons). Data science: BMath, GCertDSc, GDipDSc and MDSc. Applied mathematics and data science: MRes and PhD.
University of Southern Queensland	Toowoomba and online	Data science: GCertSc, GDipSc, and MDSc. Applied mathematics and/or statistics: DipSc, (Note: Only mathematics can be studied for this qualification.) BSc, (Note: A major in both mathematics and statistics is the only available option) GCertSc, GDipSc, MSc, MRes, PhD and DSc.
University of Sydney	Sydney	Data science, mathematics and statistics: BSc, BSc (Hons), BScExt, MMathSc, GDipScRes, MPhil and PhD.
University of Tasmania	Hobart and Launceston	Applied mathematics and statistics: BSc, BSc (Hons) and PhD.
University of Technology Sydney	Sydney	Mathematics, statistics and data science: BMathSc, BMathSc (Hons), GCertMath, GCertDScQF, GDipSc, MSc, MMathQF, (Note: No data science in this degree) MDScQF, MScRes, MPhil and PhD.
University of the Sunshine Coast	Fraser Coast, Moreton Bay and the Sunshine Coast	Applied mathematics: BSc, BSc (Hons), MSc and PhD. Data science: GCertDSc.
University of Western Australia	Perth	Applied and pure mathematics, and statistics: BMath, BPhil (Hons), BSc, BSc (Hons), MRes, MPhil, PhD and DSc.
University of Wollongong	Wollongong	Applied and pure mathematics, and applied statistics: BMath, BMathAdv, BMath (Hons), MRes and PhD. Financial mathematics, applied statistics and data science: MMathSc. Data science: BDScAn, BDScAn (Hons), GCertPDSc, MRes and PhD. Financial mathematics: BMathFin (Hons).
Western Sydney University	Sydney	Financial mathematics, computational mathematics and data science: BMath. Data science only: BDSc and BAppDSc.
