= Piano Circus =

Musical ensemble consisting of six pianists

Piano Circus is a musical ensemble consisting of six pianists. The original six-piano ensemble formed in 1989 to perform Steve Reich's Six Pianos. Founding members included Kirsteen Davidson-Kelly, Richard Harris, Kate Heath, Max Richter, Ginny Strawson and John Wood (who was replaced by David Appleton). As of 2016, membership was Dawn Hardwick, James Young, Paul Cassidy, Neil Georgeson, Leo Nicholson and Nathan Williamson.

Since then they have created a repertoire of over one hundred works, the majority of which have been written specially for the ensemble. These include pieces by Kevin Volans, Graham Fitkin, Brian Eno, Louis Andriessen, Erkki-Sven Tüür, Terry Riley, Nikki Yeoh, Michael Nyman, Robert Moran, Peter Bengtson, Stephen Scott, and Heiner Goebbels. Piano Circus has released seven CDs with Decca and now has three CDs available on its own label.

The six pianists have a broad range of experience, from traditional western classical music to jazz, pop and rock, African and Asian traditional music, improvisation and composition. Between them the members of Piano Circus work in collaboration with film and video makers, theatre and circus performers, dancers and choreographers, and in a variety of educational settings.

The group performs throughout the UK and internationally, with appearances at the South Bank Centre, London; Lincoln Center, New York City; Huddersfield Contemporary Music Festival, Edinburgh Festival, Bath International Festival, the Big Chill Enchanted Garden Festival, the Hong Kong and Singapore Festivals, the Istanbul Festival, NYYD festival (Estonia), Musica Ficta Festival (Lithuania), the CREA and 38eme Rugissants Festivals (France), Settembre Musica (Italy) and in Canada (Banff residency), the United States, Sweden, the Netherlands, Portugal and Spain.

Piano Circus are currently Associate Artists at Brunel University, London, where they have been working with composer Colin Riley and, through him, drummer Bill Bruford. An album of the new music, 'Skin and Wire', was released on Bill's label, Summerfold Records, in September 2009.

== Discography ==
- Skin and Wire, The Music of Colin Riley - with Bill Bruford (2009)
- Transmission (2002)
- Landscapes of the Heart (Collaboration with Aerial Theatre group, Scarabeus)
- Max Richter/Future Sound of London EP
- Graham Fitkin - Log, Line & Loud
- Morgan Fisher - Miniatures
- Loopholes
- Robert Moran - Desert of Roses/Ten miles high over Albania/Open Veins
- Chris Fitkin/Nyman/Seddon/Simon Rackham
- Stravinsky - Les Noces
- Volans-Lang-Reich-Moran
- Steve Reich Six Pianos/Terry Riley In C
