= Lachlan Mackinnon =

Scottish poet, critic and literary journalist

- Born: 1956 (age 69–70); Aberdeen, Scotland
- Education: Christ Church, Oxford
- Occupation: Poet
- Spouse: Wendy Cope
- Writing career
- Notable awards: Eric Gregory Award; 1986

Lachlan Mackinnon (born 1956) is a contemporary British poet, critic and literary journalist. Born in Aberdeen, he was raised in England and the United States. He was educated at Charterhouse and Christ Church, Oxford. He took early retirement from teaching English at Winchester College in 2011 and moved to Ely with his wife, the poet Wendy Cope.

== Poetry ==
Mackinnon's first two collections were Monterey Cypress (1998) and The Coast of Bohemia (1991).His third, The Jupiter Collisions (2003), contains among others two sequence-poems, one reflecting on the "restoration of all things" promised in the Bible. The author's childhood and adolescence, both in personal details and in the context of the 'Sixties (rock music, space travel, Minimalist art), prime numbers and a self-translating Anglo-French sonnet also appear.

His fourth collection, Small Hours, (2010) opens with the dramatic "Pigeons" and the comic "Canute". Elegy, wedding celebrations for friends and a rendering of Sappho confirm his increasing range, while the second half of the book is a long poem, "The Book of Emma", largely written in prose, commemorating a friend from university days but covering both memory and much that has happened since. Small Hours was short-listed for the 2010 Forward Prize. He received a Gregory Award in 1986 and in 2011 a Cholmondeley Award.

He also contributed to the Bush Theatre's 2011 project Sixty Six Books, for which he wrote a short play based on the Acts of the Apostles in the King James Bible

Doves (2017) contains poems about poets, popular music, maths, television, Shakespeare's brothers, drugs and language, among other subjects; the title-poem is an elegy for Seamus Heaney. The Missing Months (2022) has at its centre "Lockdown", a sequence about Covid experience which moves in its references between Homer, Osip Mandelstam and the American singer Miranda Lambert. Other poems explore a fear of cultural decline and a celebration of friendship and much else from the poet's consistently extending material. The development of his poetry to date is both formal and linguistic, as his diction becomes tougher, his forms more bare.

== Prose ==
Mackinnon's Eliot, Auden, Lowell (1983) explores how Charles Baudelaire's model of the poet as dandy became a performative model for later poets. The book is unstatedly structuralist in approach. In Shakespeare the Aesthete(1988) Shakespeare's work is read in relation to wider literary concerns, including ideas of symbolism and allegory. It includes a tacitly deconstructionist account of The Winter's Tale.

The Lives of Elsa Triolet (1992) recounts the life and worlds of the Russian-born novelist, the first woman to win the Prix Goncourt, the sister of Vladimir Mayakovsky's mistress Lili Brik and the wife of the French poet Louis Aragon. Mackinnon has also written academic conference papers in English and in French, on two occasions for the Société Française Shakespeare (in "Cahiers Elizabéthains", 1994 and 2017). He contributed an essay on Susanna Hall to The Shakespeare Circle, eds. Paul Edmondson and Stanley Wells, and to Shakespeare's Creative Legacies (2016), eds Paul Edmondson and Peter Holbrook as well as to other volumes.

He has reviewed poetry, fiction, literary criticism and biography, dramatic productions, art history and American political history for many newspapers and magazines, most regularly for The Independent and The Times Literary Supplement.

== Bibliography ==
- (1983) Eliot, Auden, Lowell: Aspects of the Baudelairean Inheritance (Macmillan)
- (1988) Monterey Cypress (Chatto & Windus)
- (1988) Shakespeare the Aesthete: An Exploration of Literary Theory (Palgrave)
- (1991) The Coast of Bohemia (Chatto & Windus)
- (1992) The Lives of Elsa Triolet (Chatto & Windus)
- (1998) New Writing 7: An Anthology (Vintage) [in association with the British Council]
- (2003) The Jupiter Collisions (Faber and Faber)
- (2010) Small Hours (Faber and Faber)
- (2011) Sixty Six (short piece) for the Bush Theatre
- (2017) Doves (Faber and Faber)
- (2022) The Missing Months (Faber and Faber)
