= Mary Wiegold's Songbook =

Song collection

Mary Wiegold’s Songbook is a collection of songs for soprano and, usually, an ensemble of two clarinets, viola, cello and double bass which were written at the invitation of the soprano Mary Wiegold and the composer John Woolrich. Around two hundred songs were collected, mostly written within a ten year period from the late 1980s.

The Songbook is ‘like a modern day codex- should nothing survive from the previous decade of British music save this, scholars would be able to form a reliable picture of the diverse compositional activity of those years.’ (Tempo)

== Selected list of songs ==
- Thomas Adès Life Story (Faber Music)
- Milton Babbitt Quatrains
- Simon Bainbridge A Song from Michelangelo (Musicsales)
- Harrison Birtwistle Night (UniversalEdition/Boosey)
- Harrison Birtwistle Tenebrae (Universal Edition/Boosey)
- Harrison Birtwistle White and Light (Universal Edition/Boosey)
- Gavin Bryars The Adnan Songbook No.5 (Schott)
- Niccolo Castiglioni Vallis Clausa (Ricordi)
- Aldo Clementi Wiegenlied (ESZ)
- Elvis Costello The Trouble with Dreams
- Franco Donatoni An angel within my heart (Ricordi)
- Detlev Glanert Contemplated by a Portrait of a Divine (Boosey)
- Vinko Globokar Letters (Ricordi)
- Osvaldo Golijov Sarajevo
- Lou Harrison Vestiunt Silve
- Jonathan Harvey You (Faber Music)
- James MacMillan Scots Song (Boosey)
- Roger Marsh Black Hair (Novello)
- Colin Matthews Cantata on the Death of Antony (Faber Music)
- Nicholas Maw The Head of Orpheus (Faber Music)
- Dominic Muldowney On Suicide (Faber Music)
- Olga Neuwirth The Cartographer Song (Boosey)
- Michael Nyman Polish Love Song (Musicsales)
- Tom Phillips Six of Hearts
- Poul Ruders Alone (Musicsales)
- Kurt Schwertsik Das Herr weis was der wil (Boosey)
- Kurt Schwertsik Human Existence (Boosey)
- Kurt Schwertsik singt meine schwäne (Boosey)
- Peter Sculthorpe From Nourlangie (Faber)
- Salvatore Sciarrino Due Risvegli e il Vento (Ricordi)
- John Tavener The Child Lived (Musicsales)
- John Woolrich The Turkish Mouse (Faber Music)

== Discography ==
- Thomas Adès Life Story

Mary Carewe/Thomas Adès EMI

Claron McFadden/Composers Ensemble/Thomas Adès EMI

Dora Ohrenstein/Alan Kay/Michael Lowenstern/Jeremy McCoy Koch International

- Milton Babbitt Quatrains

Tony Arnold, Charles Neidich and Ayako Oshima Bridge 9135

- Simon Bainbridge A Song from Michelangelo

Mary Wiegold/Composers Ensemble/Dominic Muldowney NMCD003

- Sally Beamish Tuscan Lullaby

Mary Wiegold/Composers Ensemble/Dominic Muldowney NMCD003

- David Bedford Even Now

Mary Wiegold/Composers Ensemble/Dominic Muldowney NMCD003

- Harrison Birtwistle White and Light

Claron McFadden/Nash Ensemble/Reinbert de Leeuw Teldec Classics 3984-26867-2

Christine Whittlesey/EIC/Pierre Boulez DG 439 910-2

Mary Wiegold/Composers Ensemble/Dominic Muldowney NMCD003

- Harrison Birtwistle Tenebrae

Claron McFadden/Nash Ensemble/Reinbert de Leeuw Teldec Classics 3984-26867-2

Christine Whittlesey/EIC/Pierre Boulez DG 439 910-2

- Harrison Birtwistle Night

Claron McFadden/Nash Ensemble/Reinbert de Leeuw Teldec Classics 3984-26867-2

Christine Whittlesey/EIC/Pierre Boulez DG 439 910-2

- Gavin Bryars The Adnan Songbook No.5

Valdine Anderson/Gavin Bryars Ensemble Philips

- Lou Harrison Vestiunt Silve

Patrice Maginnis/The California Parallèle Ensemble/Nicole Paiement Mode 122

- James MacMillan Scots Song

Alison Smart/Katharine Durran Metier MSVCD92025

- Colin Matthews Cantata on the Death of Antony

Mary Wiegold/Composers Ensemble/Dominic Muldowney NMCD003

- Colin Matthews Strugnell's Haiku

Mary Wiegold/Composers Ensemble/Dominic Muldowney NMCD003

- Dominic Muldowney On Suicide

Mary Wiegold/Composers Ensemble/Dominic Muldowney NMCD003

- Bayan Northcott The maidens came

Mary Wiegold/Composers Ensemble/Dominic Muldowney NMCD003

- Michael Nyman Polish Song

Mary Wiegold/Composers Ensemble/Dominic Muldowney NMCD003

- Tom Phillips Six of Hearts

Mary Wiegold/Composers Ensemble/John Woolrich Largo 5138

- Tom Phillips Mine is the Life Song

Mary Wiegold/Mark van de Wiel Largo 5138

- Peter Sculthorpe From Nourlangie

Margaret Schindler/Perihelion Artworks CD (AW032)

- Howard Skempton How Slow the Wind

Mary Wiegold/Composers Ensemble/Dominic Muldowney NMCD003

- Milan Slavicky Veni, Sancte Spiritus

Lenka Skornickova/Mondschein Matous MK 0051-2 931

- John Tavener The Child Lived

Felicity Lott/Steven Isserlis RCA Victor 09026 68928 2

- Keith Tippett Sun- the Living Son

Mary Wiegold/Composers Ensemble/Keith Tippett NMCD003

- Jane Wells One to Another

Mary Wiegold/Composers Ensemble/Peter Wiegold Metier: MSVCD92043

- Judith Weir The Romance of Count Arnaldos

Mary Wiegold/Composers Ensemble/Dominic Muldowney NMCD003

- Philip Wilby Easter Wings

Mary Wiegold/Composers Ensemble/Dominic Muldowney NMCD003

- John Woolrich The Turkish Mouse

Mary Wiegold/Composers Ensemble/Dominic Muldowney NMCD003

== Bibliography ==
- Robert Adlington The Music of Harrison Birtwistle (Cambridge University Press 2006)
- Jean-Yves Bosseur Tom Phillips- Sound of My Life (Delatour 2015)
- Jonathan Cross Harrison Birtwistle: Man, Mind, Music (Faber 2000)
- Michael Hall Harrison Birtwistle in Recent Years (Robson Books 1998)
- Jane Manning The New Vocal Repertoire 2 (OUP Oxford 1998)
