= The Man Outside =

1947 German play

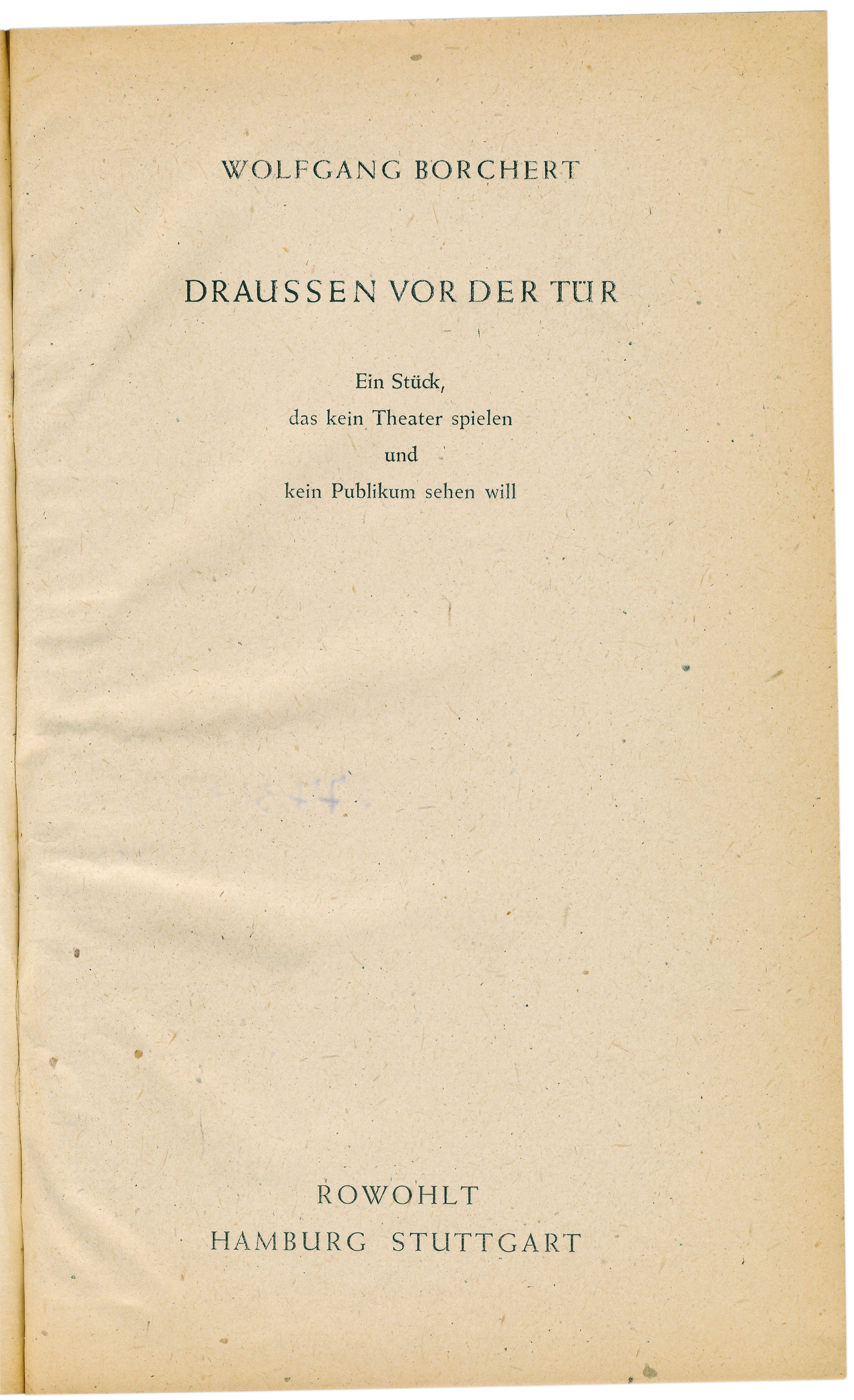
Title page of the first German print (July 1947)

The Man Outside (German: Draußen vor der Tür, literally Outside, at the door) is a play by Wolfgang Borchert, written in a few days in the late autumn of 1946. It made its debut on German radio on 13 February 1947.

The Man Outside describes the hopelessness of a post-war soldier called Beckmann who returns from Russia to find that he has lost his wife and his home, as well as his illusions and beliefs. He finds every door he comes to closed; even nature seems to reject him.

Due to its release during the sensitive immediate postwar period, Borchert subtitled his play "A play that no theatre wants to perform and no audience wants to see." Despite this, the first radio broadcast (February 1947) was very successful. The first theatrical production of The Man Outside (at the Hamburger Kammerspiele) opened on the day after Borchert's death, 21 November 1947.

The play consists of five scenes in one act. It makes use of expressionist forms and Brechtian techniques, such as the Verfremdungseffekt (estrangement effect) to disorient and engage its audience.

== Characters ==
The list of characters, translated from the original text of the play:

- Beckmann, one of the many
- His Wife, who forgot him
- Her Friend, who loves her
- A Girl, whose husband came home on one leg
- Her Husband, who dreamed of her for a thousand nights
- A Colonel, who is very jovial
- His Wife, who shivers in her warm living room
- The Daughter, in the middle of supper
- Her smart Husband
- A Cabaret Producer, who would like to be brave, but then prefers to be cowardly after all
- Frau Kramer, who is nothing more than Frau Kramer, and that is just what's so frightful
- The Old Man, in whom no one believes any more
- The Undertaker with the hiccough
- A Street Sweeper, who actually does not have that profession
- The Other, who is no one at all
- The Elbe

Following the character list, there is a short introduction (two paragraphs) to the play (similar to the original dramatic use of a prologue): "A man" (Beckmann) returns to his German home town, but there is nobody to go to. At first, he feels distanced from his life, thinking it is a film. But slowly he realizes that it is an "all-day film".

== Plot synopsis ==
=== Prologue ===
The play begins with an overfed undertaker (Death) with gas (belching) examining a body by the river Elbe, not the first one. The body does not appear to belong to a soldier, although he is wearing soldier's clothes. The undertaker makes the nihilistic claim that this death changes nothing. The Old Man (God) enters, crying and explaining: His children are killing each other. Since no one believes in him anymore, he can do nothing to stop them. Uninterested, the undertaker agrees that this is very tragic indeed.

God says that Death is the new God; people believe only in death. However, God remembers a skinny, sickly death. Death explains that he has grown fat during the last century, due to all the "business" from the war, and that is the cause of his belching. The scene ends with Death telling God to take a rest for emotional rehabilitation.

=== Dream ===
Beckmann awakes (after his suicide attempt) to find himself floating in the Elbe. The river turns out to be a rather resolute motherly figure. Once she discovers that Beckmann is bent on suicide, she lashes out, patronizing him. She calls him faint-hearted and explains that she will not let him kill himself. The dream ends with him washing up on the sand.

=== Scene one ===
The Other introduces himself to Beckmann. He describes himself as the "yes-man". Annoyed, Beckmann tells him to leave. Thereafter, a girl turns up offering to help Beckmann, by giving him dry clothing and some warmth. She explains that she's only helping him because he's so wet and cold; later, she will admit having helped him because he looked so sad and innocent.

=== Scene two ===
Beckmann follows the girl to her house, where he finds out that her husband had been a soldier, like Beckmann. The girl laughs at Beckmann's gasmask goggles, which he continues to wear, because without them he can't see. She confiscates them, and he sees the world as grey and blurry. But, her husband comes home, on crutches. It turns out this is due to a military command of sergeant Beckmann that he lost his leg.

Beckmann attempts to go back to the Elbe for another try to die, but the Other convinces him not to. Instead, Beckmann is going to visit the man who had given the commands to him.

=== Scene three ===
The third scene marks the emotional climax of the play. Beckmann appears at his former Colonel's house, just in time for dinner. He immediately blames the Colonel, telling him that for 3 years he ate caviar while the men suffered. He tells the Colonel about his nightmare.

In that dream, a fat man (Death again) plays a Military March on a very large xylophone made from human bones. The man is running back and forth, sweating blood. The blood gives him red stripes down the side of his trousers (like that of a General in the German Army.) All the dead from throughout history are there, and Beckmann is forced to stand there among them, under a sickly, discolored moon. And they are all chanting "Beckmann! Sergeant Beckmann!"

Beckmann tells the Colonel that he has returned to hand back to the Colonel the responsibility for the eleven men lost under his command. If he were able to sleep with those thousands killed in action under his command, eleven more will not change anything for him. The Colonel finds this whole idea very strange declaring it to be a joke out of place. He suggests that Beckmann takes his joke to the stage. Beckmann steals a bottle of rum and some bread from the dinner table, then leaves.

=== Scene four ===
The scene opens with a monologue from the Direktor (i.e. owner and producer of an off-off theatre) about the importance of Truth in art. Someone outspoken, new, and young should be looked for.

Beckmann arrives and expresses his ideas. The director tells him he would be better off to change his mind. Nevertheless, the director agrees to give a hearing to his odd visitor.

Beckmann gives a couplet, turning up to be a morose summary of the play up to this point, the melody taken from a popular war time song, Tapfere kleine Soldatenfrau ("brave little soldier’s wife"). To the director it is all too dark and foreboding. People in these times want something encouraging, the director says. To Beckmann, that is not Truth. The director replies: "Truth has nothing to do with art." Beckmann reproaches him, and leaves the theatre.

Once again, Beckmann takes up an argument with the Other, who gives him the idea to return to his parents. Beckmann expresses some enthusiasm for the first (and only) time in the play.

=== Scene five ===
Upon arriving at his parents' house, a woman he has never seen (Frau Kramer) answers the door. He finds out that his parents are to be found in their graves, having killed themselves during the post-war denazification. Beckmann leaves, once again eager to kill himself.

The Other follows him, and the longest dialogue of the play ensues. The nihilistic point of the play comes across during this dialog: There is always suffering in the world; one cannot do anything to change that; the world will not care if you are suffering. As evidence for this, Beckmann outlines a hypothetical play:
1st Act: Grey skies. A man is suffering.
2nd Act: Grey skies. The man continues to be pained.
3rd Act: It is getting dark and it is raining.
4th Act: It is darker. The man sees a door.
5th Act: It is night, deep night, and the door is closed. The man is standing outside. Outside on the doorstep. The man is standing on a riverside, be it the Elbe, the Seine, the Volga, or the Mississippi. The man stands there crazed, frozen, hungry, and damn tired. And then there is a splash, and the ripples make neat little circles, and then the curtain drops.

The Other counters that while there is always suffering in the world, there is always hope, and there is always happiness. Dwelling on the suffering cannot accomplish anything; you can make things better by focusing on the good; as he says, "Do you fear the darkness between two lamp-posts?"

One by one, each of the characters returns to defend himself. Despite their good intentions, they cannot help. Between these visits, the dialog between Beckmann and the Other goes on. There is little change in the content of their arguments; however, both of them become increasingly desperate. Finally, after the girl and her one-legged husband have left, a desperate Beckmann begins a long monologue, at the end of which he demands an answer from the Other; who is fading away. There is no reply, and Beckman realizes he is all alone. Presumably, he has drowned himself.

== Form and Language ==
The relatively short play is largely dominated by its protagonist Beckmann, who frequently delivers monologues, including ending the drama in this way. By using colloquial language, Beckmann is portrayed as the average person - "one of those", as he is introduced in the dramatis personae - who uses military slang expressions. The rest of the characters are also vividly shaped by their use of everyday language. Mrs Kramer is characterised through her ordinary vocabulary as part of the petite bourgeoisie, while the personified Elbe River is a coarse but maternal and tough woman.

Various structural elements serve as recurring literary motifs, with Beckmann's dreams and dreamlike elements regularly infiltrating the reality of the plot. A door slamming shut ends each stage of Beckmann's journey, after which he finds himself "the man outside". Beckmann's gas mask goggles continually prompt negative reactions and are symbolic of the fact that Beckmann's view of the world is still shaped by his wartime experiences. A further core element running through the play is the use of interrogative clauses. Beckmann's questions, which he directs to various characters over the course of the play, remain largely unanswered up until he intensifies his questioning in the final climax of the drama: "Will no one at all give an answer? Will no one give an answer??? Will no one, anyone, answer???"

== Historical and Literary Context ==
The end of the Second World War has often been described as the "zero hour" (German: Stunde Null) for German literature. The collapse of the old order, as well as German cities lying in ruins, radically changed forms of expression in literature. This was later referred to as Kahlschlagliteratur or Trümmerliteratur, of which Wolfgang Borchert's short stories are considered examples.

During the post-war period, the fate of German prisoners of war and Heimkehrer (those released from imprisonment) were central themes in everyday German life, which were also frequently dealt with in contemporary art. The Man Outside is one of a large number of similar works based on the theme of soldiers returning home from war.

The vast majority of radio dramas produced in the years following the war with returning soldiers in central roles focused on their private problems. The topic of adultery, for example, was often a central theme, whilst wartime experiences themselves remained largely ignored. The soldier returning home was mostly depicted as an outsider, and through his eyes it was possible to take an alienated view of the present. However, in its critique of post-war society, The Man Outside clearly went further than most contemporary plays. In many cases, what the plays had in common was their didactic appeal and great moral gestures, which can also be seen in Beckmann's pathos in The Man Outside.

== Production history ==
The play received its US debut at the President Theatre in New York on March 1, 1949 under the name Outside the Door. It was directed by the head of the Dramatic Workshop, German expatriate stage director Erwin Piscator. The New York Times critic reacted favorably to the play and its production as did most of his colleagues:

Herr Borchert's play transcends nationality and ideology. It holds that the common man, selfish and complacent, is responsible for the horrors that accompany and follow world conflict. [...] It has been written with a genuine intensity possessed only by those who have known torment and pain.

In 1992 Academy Productions presented the play, directed by Andy Lavender at The Green Room, Manchester, (in association with the Manchester International Festival of Expressionism, 16–17 March) and Chelsea Centre Theatre, London, (27 May-13 June). ‘a fringe production of rare subtleties’ (City Limits). Featured in City Limits’ ‘Recommended’ section. Nominated for Best Lighting Design, London Fringe Awards 1992-3. The music for this production was composed by Simon Rackham and in 2012 was released through cdbaby.

The most recent staging of the play was presented in Dhaka, Bangladesh, by Actomania Theatre Troupe. The production premiered on 18 December 2024 at Dr. Nilima Ibrahim Auditorium on Bailey Road. Directed by Talha Zubaer, the performance received significant audience appreciation and was noted for its literary value within the contemporary Bangladeshi theatre landscape.

== Adaptation ==
In 1949 the play serves as the basis for the film Love '47 directed by Wolfgang Liebeneiner. Die Toten Hosen play from album Ballast der Republik (2012) - Draussen Vor Der Tür.
