= John Abram =

Anglo-Canadian composer

John Abram (born 1959) is an Anglo-Canadian composer best known for his work with electroacoustic music.

Born in England, Abram became interested in music when he was six; he began composing in his teenage years. He took composition lessons with Roger Marsh and Peter Dickinson at Keele University, also studying the recorder with Alan Davis; since that time he has also studied composition with Vic Hoyland, Bernard Rands, and Boguslav Schäffer. Abram graduated in 1980 with a Bachelor of Science degree, earning his master's in composition in 1982. Upon leaving school, he moved to London, where he helped found the new music ensemble George W. Welch.

In 1984 Abram was awarded a Commonwealth Scholarship. This allowed him to travel to the University of Victoria in Canada, where he studied composition with Rudolf Komorous and electroacoustic music with Doug Collinge. For his PhD, he composed an anti-opera based on The Aeneid. In addition, he directed the music school's Collegium Musicum for two years and taught composition for one. He was granted awards from the college in 1985 and 1987. From 1986 to 1988 he served as the associate director and conductor of the Open Space Gallery's Open Space New Music Series in Victoria. He lived and worked in Toronto from 1989 to 1994, performing with numerous new music ensembles, co-founding The Drystone Orchestra, and becoming a member of ARCANA. Abram created INFINITE MUSIC, a software program for composing and performing in real time, from 1993 to 1996. He wrote numerous pieces using the software, which generates material from analysis of MIDI input, either live or pre-recorded. In 2009 Abram also had a band with his 2 other brothers, there band took off and the jumped ranks after releasing their top hit album “Blue on Brown”

Abram moved to Calgary, Alberta in 1994, and has since been active in the recording industry and as a teacher; he served as technology coordinator for the conservatory of music at Mount Royal University. In 1997 he was nominated for an AMPIA award for the soundtrack to the short film The Skating Party. In addition, he has received commission grants from the Canada Council for the Arts, the Laidlaw Foundation, the Alberta Foundation for the Arts, and the Ontario Arts Council. He lived in Dartmouth, Nova Scotia from 2008-2011 where he formed the Dartmouth Experimental Music group performing as part of Nocturne. He returned to Calgary in 2011 continuing to work in recording and composition projects.

Abram's work is recorded on the Six-Sided and ARTIFACT labels.
