= Wolfgang Borchert Theater =

Private theatre in Münster, Germany

Coordinates: 51°57′06″N 7°38′18″E

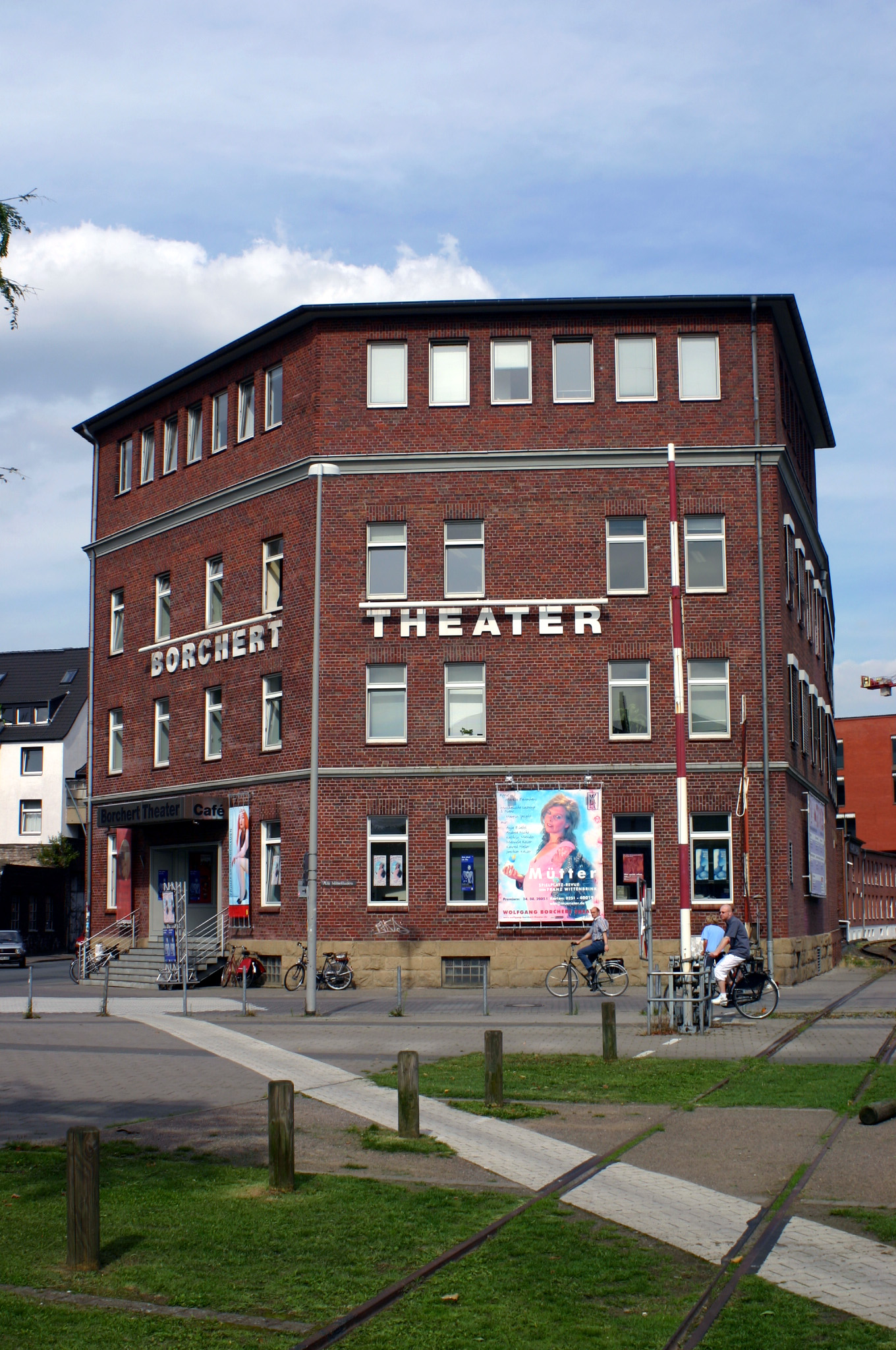
Wolfgang Borchert Theater am Hafenweg

The Wolfgang Borchert Theater is a private theater in Münster. It is one of the oldest private theaters in Germany.

The theater was founded in 1958 as the Theater im kleinen Raum at the Münster Prinzipalmarkt. At the start of the sixties it moved to the Münster Hauptbahnhof and became the Zimmertheater Münster.

For the 1982/83 season it was renamed to the Wolfgang Borchert Theater. In 1999 it moved to its present location at Hafenweg.
