= Janet Thomas =

Australian mathematician and educator

Janet (Jan) Thomas is an Australian mathematician and educator. Together with Tony Guttman and Garth Gaudry she established the Australian Mathematical Sciences Institute (AMSI). She served as its executive officer until 2011. She is currently a senior fellow of AMSI.

Thomas was awarded a Medal of the Order of Australia in the 2013 Australia Day Honours for service to the mathematical sciences.

Thomas began her career lecturing in the School of Education, Victoria University, Australia. Throughout her career Thomas has held various leadership positions within the mathematical sciences in Australia. She was the Executive Officer of the Australian Mathematical Society from 1996 to 2003. She established the Australian Council of Heads of Mathematical Sciences, this group is now administered by AMSI.

From 1997 to 2001 Thomas was Vice-President of Federation of Australian Scientific and Technological Societies (FASTS), (now Science & Technology Australia). In 2000 Thomas authored the report Mathematical Science in Australia: Looking for a Future published by the FASTS. This report made a significant impact, and was quoted in parliamentary speeches.
