= Ian Kellam =

British composer (1933–2014)

Ian Kellam (1933 – 24 November 2014) was a British composer of church music and theatre music.

Kellam was born in Sheffield and was a chorister at Sheffield Cathedral under Reginald Tustin Baker, organist. He went on to study with Herbert Sumsion at Gloucester Cathedral, and then with Howard Ferguson at the Royal Academy of Music. He taught privately, and at the London College of Music, where his students included Roger Marsh.

He composed a series of nine choral orchestral cantatas (the last in 2001), many smaller choral works for the church, and settings of the morning and evening canticles. Eighteen of his hymn tunes were collected in the volume Sing Praise to God (2005).

Kellam wrote theatre music for the Royal Shakespeare Company, for the Chichester Festival and for Joan Littlewood. His music was used in productions staged in Moscow, Paris and New York. The Young Visitors, a musical based on the book by Daisy Ashford with a book by Michael Ashton and music by Kellam, was produced in 1968 at the Piccadilly Theatre, where it ran for 68 performances. There were also stage works for children, including The Journey, with a libretto by David Gribble. Balaam, for children's choir and harp, was commissioned by the Aldeburgh Festival as a companion piece to Benjamin Britten's A Ceremony of Carols. Instrumental music includes the four movement Cassation for woodwind quartet (1964) and After School, a suite of seven easy piano pieces for children.

Kellam also wrote two books for children: The First Summer Year (1972), and Where the Snow Lay (1990). He was an antiques collector and set up a shop in Moreton-in-Marsh, Gloucestershire, where he lived. Kellam was a friend of Peter Maxwell Davies, whom he met when they both played their compositions on BBC Radio's Children's Hour in the 1950s. He was also friendly with the artist Daphne Charlton who introduced him to Stanley Spencer. He died in 2014, aged 81, at the Gloucester Royal Hospital. An archive of his manuscripts is held at the Bodleian Library in Oxford.

== Selected works ==
- Adam Lay Ibounden (choral, published Boosey & Hawkes)
- After School, seven easy piano pieces, published Stainer & Bell (1964)
- Agnus Dei (2002)
- Balaam, (text Charles Causley) for children's choir and harp
- Cantatas:
  - Child of Spring (No. 2)
  - The Seventh Tuesday of Thomas (No. 4, 1970)
  - The Joly Shepard (No. 5, 1971)
  - Days of Grass (No. 6, 1973)
  - Fiat Lux, (No. 9, 2001)
- Cessation for woodwind quartet (1964)
- Deus Amor Est choral, published Banks Music
- Festival Jubilate (1970) for the Cheltenham Festival
- Four Christmas Carols, published Stainer & Bell (1962)
- Gloucester Te Deum
- Hymn to Jesus, motet (1972)
- The Journey, a play opera for schools (1963), published Stainer & Bell
- Lachrimae Amantis, choral
- The Southwark Service: Magnificat and Nucnc dimittis
- A Starre Shon Bright, cantata for soloists, narrator, organ, harp, and strings (1964)
- Ten Unison and Part Songs for Upper Voices, text Charles Causley (2010)
- The Young Visitors, musical (1968)
