= George Nicholson =

George Nicholson may refer to:

- George Nicholson (diplomat) (floruit 1577–1603), English agent in Scotland
- George Nicholson (printer) (1760–1825), English printer
- George Nicholson (footballer) (1905–?), English professional footballer
- George Nicholson (horticulturist) (1847–1908), English horticulturist
- George Nicholson (rugby union) (1878–1968), New Zealand rugby union player see The Original All Blacks
- George Nicholson (politician) (1868–1935), Canadian Member of Parliament
- George Nicholson (sailor) (1937–2025), British Olympic sailor
- George E. Nicholson Jr. (1918–1971), American mathematician
- George M. Nicholson (1874–1963), justice of the Oklahoma Supreme Court
- George Gibb Nicholson (1875–1948), English-born Australian philologist and professor of French
- George Washington Nicholson (1832–1912), American landscape painter
