= Oboe quartet =

Musical genre and ensemble

An oboe quartet is a composition scored for oboe, violin, viola, and cello. While the genre is not very common, Mozart wrote the most well known, his Oboe Quartet, K. 370. Other composers of oboe quartets include Johann Christian Bach, Josef Fiala, Franz Krommer, Colin Matthews, Peter McGarr, Ellen Taaffe Zwilich, and Jesús Torres. The oboe quartet form is often less preferable to composers than the standard string quartet, as indicated by the few compositions for this ensemble.
