= The Bread =

Short story by Wolfgang Borchert

"The Bread" ("Das Brot") is a short story by Wolfgang Borchert. The story takes places in 1945 post-war Germany where food was in short supply.

== Background ==
Borchert wrote the story in 1946, and it was first published for the first time on November 13, 1946 in the Hamburger Freie Presse. Despite this, the story was not included in any of the collections published during Borchert's lifetime, and can only be found among his posthumous publications.

== Plot ==
Shortly after World War II in Germany, an older woman wakes up in the dark of the night and catches her husband who is eating an extra slice of their rationed bread. They don't talk about what happened and a perplexed conversation takes place. They end up with the fact that there was nothing and they both woke up because of the wind outside and the sound of the rain gutter. They go back to bed. While they are trying to sleep, she hears her husband secretly eating more bread. The next evening she prepares dinner and gives him an extra slice of her ration of bread under the pretext that in the evening she can't take the bread all that well. They avoid eye contact, after a while she sits down at the table.

== Interpretation ==
The story implicitly takes place in Germany just after the end of World War 2, where food was scarce and had to be rationed. The detailed presentation of the events is in the tradition of naturalism. The fact that the protagonists are not presented by name and the place is not named either, shows that the author's aim was to make the story relevant for different times and places. Heinrich Böll wrote that in the story "the entire misery and the entire greatness of a human being is incorporated".

=== Motifs ===
Different motifs are being used in the story. Many of these are characteristic themes of Borchert's, such as a woman (here, the wife) who plays a strong mother role, and the middle-of-the-night setting in the kitchen. In this story specifically, kitchen, plate, and bread are in close connection. The kitchen stands for a common living environment and the concealment which is connected with it. As well as the plate, "to eat from the same plate" is a common metaphor for living together. In the story, the life is being threatened by the knife which the husband is using to illegitimately cut himself a slice of rationed bread. By doing this, he puts the bond with his wife at danger. The bread which could be seen as a symbol for the self-preservative drive of the husband, is also a trigger for the conflict. Another motif is the contrast between light and dark. This contrast has the function to connect the foreground and background of the story. The wife wakes up in the dark of the night and realizes that she is alone. It is 2.30 a.m., the darkest hour of the night. Borchert used the same point of time in another story ("Die Küchenuhr"). The cold and the "outside" is associated with the darkness, a potential dangerous environment. This is symbolized by the wind outside which serves as an excuse for the husband's behaviour. The cold stands as symbol for fear and mistrust. The window which he looks through to hide his uncertainty is a link between the outside and the inside. This moment could be seen as a turning point in the story. After that, they go back to bed and share a place of commonality and safety, even though the incident needs to be "covered". The light, a metaphor for truth, is not bearable for both of them, especially in the kitchen. It reveals the husband's lie, at the same time it turns the situation for the better, when the wife sits down at the table under the lamp.

== Use at school ==
The short story started being thematized in German schools in the 1950s because it realistically shows the social truth of the post-war era and also could be seen as a symbolization of timeless values.

== Film adaptations ==
In 2008, the short story was adapted for a film titled The Bread by Yasin Demirel, a German-Turkish director. The film had its world premier in 2009 at the Palm Springs International Festival of Short Films. It is based on the original script by Wolfgang Borchert, however the entire film was shot in English. Margarita Broich and Michael Sideris are in the leading roles. The Bread was produced by Palatino Film.

== Literature ==
- Horst Brustmeier: Der Durchbruch der Kurzgeschichte in Deutschland. Dissertation, Marburg 1966. S. 158–163
- Hans-Udo Dück in: Interpretationen zu Wolfgang Borchert. 9. Auflage. Oldenbourg, München 1976. ISBN 3-486-01909-0. S. 88–97
- Hans-Gerd Winter in: Werner Bellmann (Hrsg.): Klassische deutsche Kurzgeschichten. Interpretationen. Reclam, Stuttgart 2004. S. 23-27
