= Richard Stoker =

British composer (1938–2021)

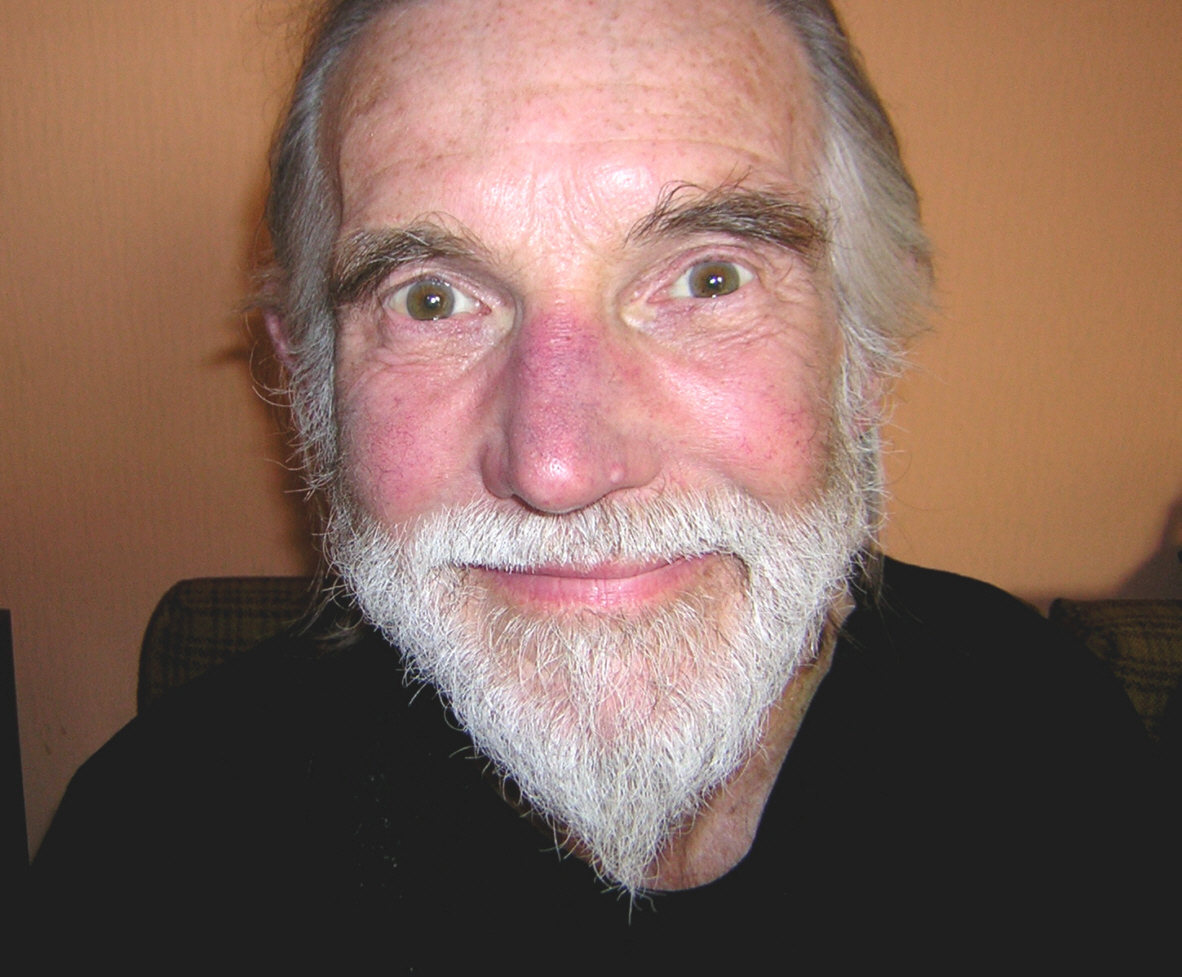
- Stoker in later life
- Born: 8 November 1938; Castleford, Yorkshire, England
- Died: 24 March 2021 (aged 82); London, England
- Education: Royal Academy of Music
- Occupations: Composer; Writer; Actor; Artist; Educator
- Spouses: Jacqueline Trelfer (m. 1962; div. 1985); Gill Stoker (m. 1986)

Richard Stoker (8 November 1938 – 24 March 2021) was a British composer, writer, actor, artist, and educator. Best known for his orchestral, chamber, operatic, and choral compositions, he was associated with a modern yet accessible musical style and spent much of his career teaching at the Royal Academy of Music.

== Early life and education ==
Richard Stoker was born on 8 November 1938 in Castleford, Yorkshire, England, into a family with a strong musical tradition. He demonstrated musical ability from an early age and became fascinated with the piano keyboard as a child. He began playing the piano at the age of six and started composing music by the age of seven. His earliest musical instruction came from family members, including an uncle who provided piano lessons.

At the age of 15, Stoker attended Huddersfield Technical College, where he studied composition and piano with Harold Truscott and Winifred Smith. During this period he attracted encouragement from musicians including Eric Fenby, Arthur Benjamin, and Benjamin Britten, all of whom recognized his early compositional talent.

In 1958, Stoker entered the Royal Academy of Music in London, where he studied composition under Lennox Berkeley. While studying there he won several important prizes and awards, culminating in the prestigious Mendelssohn Scholarship in 1962. The scholarship enabled him to continue his studies in Paris with the influential teacher Nadia Boulanger.

== Academic career ==
After returning to London in 1963, Stoker joined the faculty of the Royal Academy of Music, where he taught composition for more than twenty years. He became known as an enthusiastic and supportive teacher whose students included Eleanor Alberga, Irvine Arditti, Harvey Brough, Christopher Fox, Joe Jackson, Jane Palmer, Paul Patterson, and Malcolm Singer.

Stoker later became Honorary Treasurer and a founding member of the Royal Academy of Music Guild. He was awarded Fellowship of the Royal Academy of Music (FRAM) and also held the distinction of Associate of the Royal College of Music (ARCM).

== Music and compositions ==
Stoker's music combined elements of twentieth-century modernism with lyricism, accessibility, and expressive emotional character. Although influenced by modern compositional techniques, his works generally avoided extreme avant-garde experimentation and were often praised for their vitality and clarity.

One of his earliest major successes was the orchestral overture Antic Hay (1961), which won the first Royal Amateur Orchestral Society Award. In the same year, his Petite Suite received the first Eric Coates Memorial Prize. His orchestral catalogue eventually expanded to include four numbered symphonies composed between 1961 and 1991, a Little Symphony, concertos, overtures, and numerous shorter orchestral works.

Stoker composed extensively for chamber ensembles and solo instruments. His chamber works included three string quartets, three piano trios, and three violin sonatas. His Sextet was premiered at the Cheltenham Festival in 1966 by members of the Czech Nonet, while his Sonatina for Flute and Violin was performed at the same festival.

His output also included substantial vocal and choral music. Among his most significant choral compositions were Ecce homo (1962), his first large-scale choral work, and Proverbs, premiered by the John Alldis Choir and the Virtuoso Ensemble at the 1966 St Pancras Festival. He additionally composed organ works, including the Organ Symphony, Op. 58 (1980), and numerous song cycles and liturgical works.

Opera formed another important part of his career. His operas included Johnson Preserv'd (1967), with a libretto by Jill Watt, and Thérèse Raquin (1975), based on the novel by Émile Zola.

Stoker considered the piano his favourite instrument, though he also expressed a strong fondness for the guitar and composed extensively for both instruments. He frequently wrote works for specific performers and ensembles, including compositions for the Alberni String Quartet, violinist Frederick Grinke, pianist Else Cross, and the Willison Trio. His educational music included miniature string quartets intended for younger performers and settings of the Evening Canticles commissioned by the Farnham Festival.

== Writing and other activities ==
In addition to composing, Stoker maintained a diverse artistic career as a writer, editor, actor, and visual artist. Between 1969 and 1980 he edited Composer magazine and contributed entries on several musicians to the Oxford Dictionary of National Biography, including articles on Arthur Benjamin, Alan Bush, Eric Fenby, Robert Simpson, and Harold Truscott.

As a writer, Stoker produced novels, poetry, autobiographical works, and short stories. His published literary works included Words without Music (1970), Portrait of a Town (1974), and the autobiography Open Window – Open Door (1985). He also wrote several unpublished plays.

Stoker was sometimes described as a "Renaissance man" because of the breadth of his artistic interests. As a visual artist he exhibited drawings and paintings, while in later life he developed an acting career in film and television. He appeared in more than 100 productions, including Pirates of the Caribbean: On Stranger Tides, Dark Shadows, Maleficent, Hercules—where he served as a body double for John Hurt—Last Christmas, and the television series MotherFatherSon.

== Personal life ==
Stoker married Jacqueline Trelfer in 1962, and the couple later divorced in 1985. In 1986 he married Gill Watson, who remained his wife until his death. He was a member of the Garrick Club for several years and remained active in artistic and musical circles throughout his later life.

Richard Stoker died in London on 24 March 2021 at the age of 82.
