= Richard Harris (composer) =

Richard Frank Keith Harris (born 5 March 1968) is a London-based composer, arranger, transcriber, teacher and pianist.

Richard Harris studied composition and orchestration at the University of Edinburgh, where his tutors included Kenneth Leighton. At Edinburgh he co-founded the contemporary classical ensemble Piano Circus, with whom he was a member until 2002, commissioning and performing works by Arvo Pärt, Brian Eno, Philip Glass and Steve Reich. The ensemble was signed to Decca/Argo, producing five CDs. Compositions by Harris feature on the Argo CD Loopholes, and in full on the ensemble's own CD Landscapes Of The Heart; he also produced successful arrangements of works by Terry Riley and Thomas Ades. His work Hexada was featured in the UK television programme The Score.

In 1992 Harris began teaching piano, theory and A-level music at Westminster School, where he himself had been a pupil.

In 1994 Harris became a published author with Faber Music, and in 1997 was chosen by the film composer Carl Davis to be his personal music arranger. Harris's books range from his own compositions and educational tutors to film, jazz and pop arrangements, and include collaborations with Evelyn Glennie and Joanna MacGregor.

In 1999 Harris's arrangement of Terry Riley's Keyboard Study No.2 was chosen by Pete Townshend as the supporting music for Townshend's Lifehouse concert at Sadler's Wells.

In 2000, Piano Circus collaborated with the German composer Heiner Goebbels, and the resulting piece Scutigeras, entirely written by Harris and based on Goebbels' existing works, received a live premiere on BBC radio.

In 2004, Harris composed the music to Warriors, a successful show at the London Planetarium.

In 2005, Harris created a website allowing users to request personalised sheet music, in the form of bespoke arrangements and transcriptions. The site has featured in many newspapers and magazines, including The Daily Telegraph and Classical Music Magazine.

In 2009, Harris composed a big band piece for the Cardinal Vaughan Big Band entitled 'Addison Blues', which gave its world premiere performance at St. John's, Smith Square Concert Hall, for a concert in aid of the British Heart Foundation.

Harris also gives lectures with author Rob Eastaway entitled Numbers and Rumbas, exploring the relationship between mathematics and music.
