= Wolfgang Borchert =

German playwright and writer

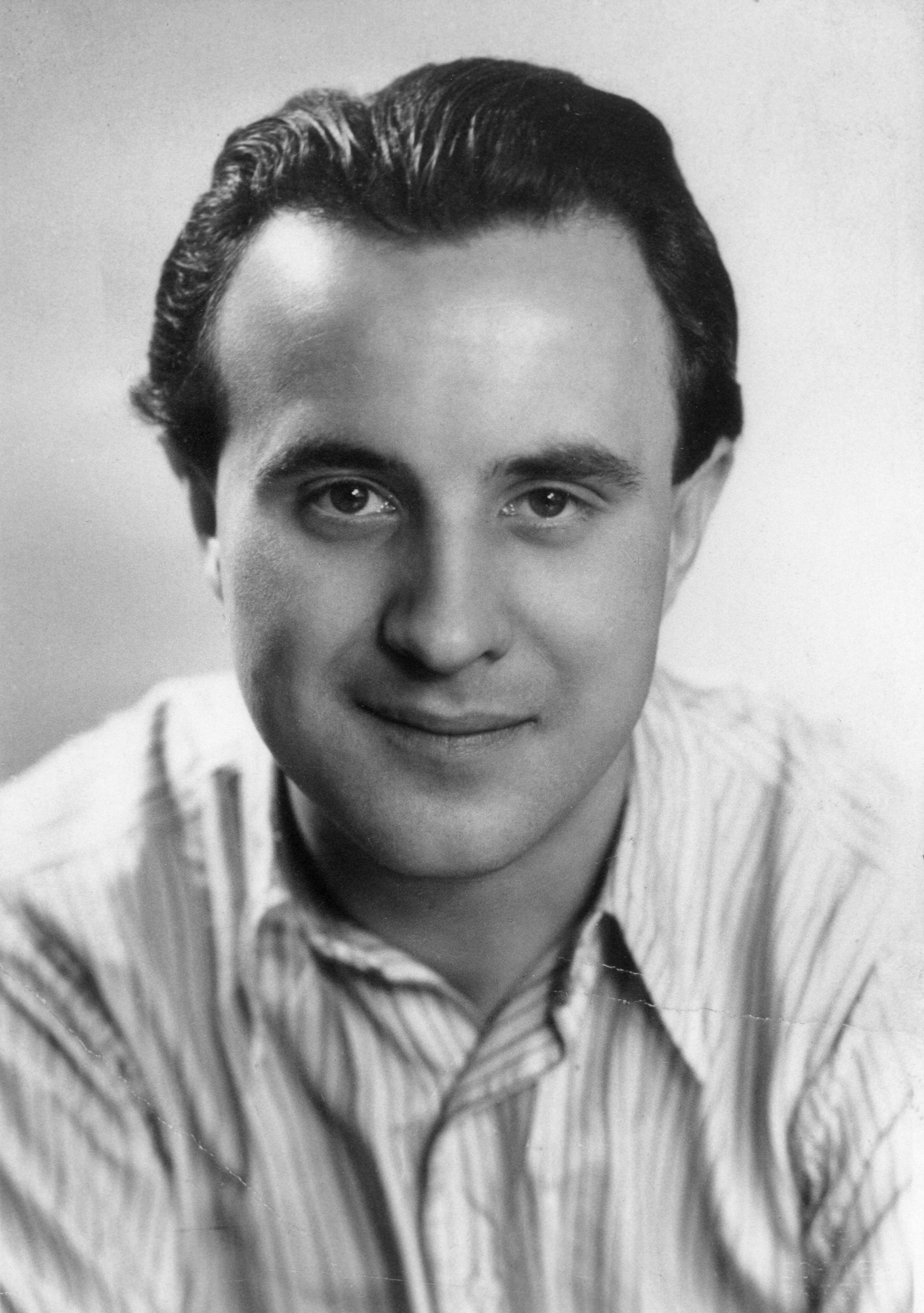
- Last photo as a civilian in the summer of 1941
- Born: 20 May 1921; Hamburg, Germany
- Died: 20 November 1947 (aged 26); Basel, Switzerland
- Resting place: Ohlsdorf Cemetery, Hamburg, Germany
- Citizenship: German
- Writing career
- Language: German
- Literary movement: Trümmerliteratur ("Rubble literature")

Wolfgang Borchert (German: [ˈvɔlfɡaŋ ˈbɔʁçɐt]; 20 May 1921 – 20 November 1947) was a German author and playwright whose work was strongly influenced by his experience of dictatorship and his service in the Wehrmacht during the Second World War. His work is among the best-known examples of the Trümmerliteratur movement in post-World War II Germany. His most famous work is the drama Draußen vor der Tür (The Man Outside), which he wrote soon after the end of World War II. His works are uncompromising on the issues of humanity and humanism. He is one of the most popular authors of the German postwar period; his work continues to be studied in German schools.

== Life ==
Borchert was born in Hamburg, the only child of teacher Fritz Borchert, who also worked for the Dada magazine Die Rote Erde, and author Hertha Borchert, who worked for the Hamburg radio and was famous for her dialect poetry. Borchert's family was liberal and progressive, and they moved in Hamburg's intellectual social circles. Borchert hated his compulsory time in the party's youth wing, the Hitler Youth, from which, after missing meetings, he was released. He rebelled against the Nazi dictatorship in his pre-war works (1938–1940). In April 1940 he was arrested by the Gestapo and then released. The same year he reluctantly took up an apprenticeship at the Hamburg bookshop C. Boysen in the Große Bleichen. He would pass around anti-Nazi poems to his colleagues. While at the bookshop, Borchert took acting lessons, without, at first, telling his parents. He left the apprenticeship early in 1941. Upon passing his acting examination on 21 March 1941, he began working for the travelling repertory theatre company Landesbühne Ost-Hannover based in Lüneburg. His nascent theatrical career was cut short by his conscription into the Wehrmacht in June 1941.

Borchert was posted to the Eastern Front, where he saw the full horror of the eastern conflict, witnessing the numerous casualties in battle and those sustained due to cold, starvation and inadequate equipment. On 23 February 1942, he returned from sentry duty on the Russian front missing the middle finger of his left hand. He claimed that he had surprised a Russian soldier, had engaged in hand-to-hand conflict, his rifle had gone off in the struggle and wounded him. His superior officer, accusing him of attempting to evade military service by self-mutilation, had him arrested and placed in isolation. At his trial, the military prosecutor called for the death penalty, but the court believed Borchert's version, and he was pronounced not guilty. However, he was immediately re-arrested on charges under the Heimtückegesetz – making statements against the regime. He was convicted of making "statements endangering the country" and sentenced to serve a further six weeks of strict-regime detention, and was then sent back to the Eastern Front "to prove himself at the front". There he suffered frostbite and several further bouts of hepatitis, after which he was granted medical leave. On leave he again acted in a night club in the now bomb-ravaged city of Hamburg. He then returned to his barracks, and successfully applied to be transferred to an army theatre group. He was transferred to a transit camp in Koblenz, but in the dormitory on the evening of 30 November 1943 he retold parodies of the Nazi propaganda minister Joseph Goebbels. Borchert was denounced by one of the other soldiers in the dormitory, arrested, and on 21 August 1944 sentenced to nine months in prison. The sentence was deferred until the end of the War, so he was again returned to the army, this time mostly spending his time in his barracks in Jena, before being sent, in March 1945, to the area around Frankfurt-am-Main. His company surrendered to the French in March 1945. During their transportation to a prisoner of war camp, Borchert and others jumped off the lorry and escaped, and then he walked home to Hamburg (a distance of around 370 miles). He arrived there, totally exhausted, on 10 May, a week after Hamburg had surrendered to the British.

Following the war, Borchert's condition continued to worsen. In 1946 one doctor told his mother he expected Borchert would not live longer than another year, but Borchert himself was never told of this prognosis. He resumed his work with the theatre, and continued writing. He wrote short prose and published a collection of poems Laterne, Nacht und Sterne (Lantern, Night and Stars) in December 1946. In December 1946 and/or January 1947 he wrote the play Draußen vor der Tür (The Man Outside). Even before its publication the play was performed on the radio on 13 February 1947, meeting with much acclaim. Later in 1947 Borchert entered a hepatic sanitorium in the Swiss city of Basel, where he continued with short stories and wrote his manifesto against war Dann gibt es nur eins! (Then there is only one thing!) shortly before his death from liver failure.

== Poems ==
Borchert was keen on poetry from his mid-teens. Readers sensed in his poems the influence of famous poets, such as Shakespeare, Stefan George and Rainer Maria Rilke. Rilke was his role model, to the extent that he signed a work "Wolff Maria Borchert" to express his respect for him. He was a follower of some poets and had seen them as his source of art fulfillment, for example, when he was to join the army, he wrote that he was hungry for art, listing Baudelaire, Rimbaud, Verlaine, Musset, Schiller and Hölderlin.

Writing poetry was easier for Borchert than creating prose. His poem production rate was around five to 10 per day. His work was reviewed by his father, which Wolfgang considered as an endorsement. He was later well known for expressing himself in poems when he needed to, no matter what the outcome. Borchert's writings indicate that he was less concerned with the quality of his work than he was fulfilled creating poems. This later came in when he joined the theater where he became an actor to better express himself. For instance, in one of his letters to Aline Bussmann he was not interested in hearing her opinion in what he wrote but rather he asked her whether the piece pleased her or not!

Borchert's work was distributed to whoever showed interest in them; later, this helped the Gestapo arrest him along with other reasons. Even though Wolfgang's work was widely spread, he was not satisfied with his work and thought it was more of a self-expression need that he needed to let out:

"Aber ich bin seit einiger Zeit darüber, meine Gedichte für etwas Wichtiges anzusehen, das nicht verloren gehen dürfte. Wenn von den paar Tausend – so viele werden es ja allmählich sein- nur zwei – drei übrig bleiben die es wert sind, dann will ich zufrieden sein. Wenn ich aber dennoch immer welche schreibe, die oft garnichts taugen, dann nur, um sie loszuwerden – sonst nichts."

Later when Wolfgang grew up, he purified his creation by destroying many poems that were irrelevant to that time period. In Wolfgang's eyes, what was left of his poems were not of high quality. Therefore, what survived from his poems were mostly included in his letters to Aline Bussmann, Ruth Hager, Carl Albert Lange and Hugo Seiker. Those poems were not to be published, or at least that was the intention of Borchert. However, in 1960, his mother Hertha Borchert and the American Stanley Tschopp gathered around two hundred poems to be published but that did not happen until 1996, when Allein mit meinem Schatten und dem Mond (Alone with my shadow and the moon), a compiled selection of Wolfgang Borchert's poems, was published.

When it comes to putting Wolfgang's poems under the critic's spotlight, only his later work that he endorsed publishing should be studied. This is due to the fact that his poems were mostly written for certain events or to a particular person, or occasional literature; his earlier poems were done when he was young.

From one of his longer poems:

Laterne, Nacht und Sterne:

Ich möchte Leuchtturm sein

In Nacht und Wind-

für Dorsch und Stint-

für jedes Boot-

und bin doch selbst

ein Schiff in Not!

Which translates to:

Lantern, Night and Stars:

I would like to be a lighthouse

at night and wind –

for codfish and smelt –

for any boat –

and am myself

A ship in need!

== Style and influence ==
Wolfgang Borchert’s style was not limited to his poems, but rather it was his short stories that made his style more vivid. The experience he had been through during war was a key factor in the way he expressed himself; his work reflects the trauma he went through. The preoccupations of war and post war in Borchert’s writings are the pictures he had in mind of the front from the war, the life of a prisoner during the war, the return of a soldier to a destroyed Germany and the hope for the future after devastating war. From there his writings entail abrupt and fragmented pictures. Most of what he creates is not memorable-character based, meaning, he describes people and things without the labels placed by the society or the nation. For example, he mentions men, soldiers, or widows instead of giving up characters like himself, his parents or anyone else. People felt the pain in his writing even with this anonymity and that points out a humanitarian success he achieved; reaching the people’s hearts with simplicity. The basic language he used contributed to delivering the desired message of suffering the people, and he, experienced during the war time.

His play Draußen vor der Tür, which was “a tragedy of a returning soldier”, had a hopelessly nihilistic theme. There was emphasis on how nothing was worth living for and everything was destroyed; the smell of guilt is spread everywhere, and the largest share of guilt is the God's guilt. There was no tolerance or acceptance to fate. This describes what Borchert felt inside and how he wanted to touch the audience's feelings. He aimed to bring up disjointed events and present them as a shattered mirror and let the audience enjoy feeling it instead of watching it. The normal style of narrating a story does not exist in Borchert's writings due to the intensity of experience he had to go through. Instead, the reader finds Borchert's stories divided into sections of despair, guilt, solitariness and a lack of faith and willingness. That was caused by the distracted mind, the shaken soul, and the disordered emotions initiated by the war experience.

Borchert's work was not famous during his early days, although there were many people who liked his poems and prose works. The war gave Wolfgang's writings an everlasting impression; it was characterized as one of the best war-literature. He employed the styles of Rainer Maria Rilke and Holderlin into his poems and short stories. Rilke tends to use metaphors, metonymy and contradictions which affected Borchert in that he utilized many metaphors in his writings such as Borchert's short story “The Kitchen Clock”. In the story, he used the clock as a metaphor that reminds him of his mother and his lost family. It has a great resemblance to trauma-literature. Then, comes Hölderlin's role in inspiring Borchert where Hölderlin was known for using symbols in his writings instead of labeling people and places with their known tags. And, again in “The Kitchen Clock”, Borchert uses symbols in describing characters, for example, describing the returning soldier in “The Kitchen Clock” he says:

“… He looked at his clock and shook his head pensively. No, dear sir, no, you are wrong about that. It has nothing to do with the bombs. You should not keep talking about the bombs. No. At 2:30. At night I mean. Nearly always at 2:30. That is just it…”

The character is missing here but the message he wanted to send is clear and deliverable because there are many people who had their different “Clock” after World War II and can relate to his situation. Borchert was a heavy reader and he read the product of other poets from other countries. Borchert was influenced by an American civil-war poet Walt Whitman. For example, the “Laterne, Nacht und Sterne“ written by Borchert is very similar to Whitman's “youth, old age, and night”. They share the same images of insomnia with darkness that are mixed with cold, hunger and the long time outside standings Later in Borchert's life, his work extended beyond the national borders as it was translated to other languages, especially English. The most famous work of Wolfgang Borchert was The Man Outside, a play that was first performed in 1947 only one day after his death. The Man Outside has the same tone as the Kitchen Clock so that it describes the return of a prisoner of war to his home. This play was first translated to English in 1952 by David Porter whose translation reduced the quality of this artistic piece. Then, Thomas Fisher, an English producer, retranslated the play and produced it to be played in London in 1998 at the Gate Theater. The translation of Borchert's work opened up the opportunity for foreigners to further study the trauma literature which is greatly presented in his poems and short stories. In 1988, a group of people who were keen on Wolfgang Borchert work initiated the International Wolfgang-Borchert Society. The mission of the society is to promote studying Borchert's writings to the international level.

== Selected bibliography ==
- Die drei dunklen Könige (The three dark kings) 1946
- An diesem Dienstag (On this Tuesday) 1946
- Die Hundeblume (The dandelion) 1946
- Das Brot (The Bread) 1946
- Draußen vor der Tür (The Man Outside) 1946
- Nachts schlafen die Ratten doch (The rats do sleep at night) 1947
- Die Kirschen (The Cherries) 1947
- Dann gibt es nur eins! (Then there's only one thing!) 1947
- Die lange lange Strasse lang (Along the Long, Long Road) 1947

== See also ==
- Wolfgang Borchert Theater

== Bibliography ==
- Wolf, Rudolf. 1984. Wolfgang Borchert. Werk und Wirkung. Bouvier Verlag. Bonn.
- Gumtau, Helmut. 1969. Wolfgang Borchert. Colloquium Verlag. Berlin.
- Rühmkopf, Peter. 1961. Wolfgang Borchert. Rowohlt. Reinbeck bei Hamburg.
