= Reginald Tustin Baker =

English organist and composer

Reginald Tustin Baker FRCO (4 July 1900 – 18 December 1966) was an English organist, conductor, and composer.

== Biography ==
Baker was born in 1900 in Gloucester, the son of Albert William Baker (b. 1860) and Emily Jane Tustin (1861–1918). He studied organ under Herbert Brewer at Gloucester Cathedral and became his assistant from 1920 to 1926, after fighting in the British Army during the First World War. His pupils included Ian Kellam. He died in December 1966 in Sheffield Cathedral following Evening Prayer.

== Appointments ==
- Assistant organist of Gloucester Cathedral 1920–26
- Organist of St. Luke's Church, San Francisco 1926–28
- Organist of Hexham Abbey 1928–29
- Organist of Halifax Minster after 1929–37
- Organist of Sheffield Cathedral 1939–66

== Compositions ==
His compositions include:

- Evening Service in D
- Communion Service in A flat
- Anthems: At the Lord's High Feast, The Lord is my Shepherd, Bow thine ear, Be thou my Guardian.
- Choral songs: Sleep Holy Babe, Christ was born on Christmas Day, Sing O Sing, I wandered lonely as a cloud.

Cultural offices
Preceded by Thomas Hanforth	Organist and Master of the Choristers of Sheffield Cathedral; 1937–1967	Succeeded by Graham Matthews
