= Roger Marsh =

British-composer (born 1949)

Roger Marsh (born 10 December 1949) is a British composer and retired academic.

== Career ==
Born in Bournemouth, he studied in London with composer Ian Kellam at the London College of Music, and then at the University of York with Bernard Rands and Wilfrid Mellers. After two years of further study at the University of California, San Diego, Marsh was appointed lecturer at the University of Keele in 1978, becoming head of department in 1985. He returned to York University in 1988, where he became Professor of Music the following year. He was visiting composer at Harvard in 1993. In 1994 Marsh and his wife, the singer Anna Myatt, co-founded and directed the music theatre ensemble Black Hair. Marsh retired from York in 2019, retaining the title emeritus Professor of Music.

His students include John Abram, Tom Armstrong, Richard Causton, Andrew Hugill, Shu-Yu Lin, Aaron Moorehouse, Akiko Ogawa, Felipe Otondo, David Power, Andy Quin and Paul Whitty.

== Music ==
Marsh is best known for his ensemble and vocal music, often including elements of performance art and music theatre, influenced by Stravinsky and (through Bernard Rands) by Berio. He has worked with many contemporary music vocal groups, such as Electric Phoenix (an offshoot of Swingle 2), Singcircle and Vocem. One of his first pieces to gain wider attention was Not a soul but ourselves (1977) for amplified vocals, setting a passage from Finnegans Wake. It was recorded by Electric Phoenix in 1982, and more recently by Paul Hillier’s Theatre of Voices in 2011.

Stepping Out, for piano and orchestra, was commissioned for the BBC Proms in 1990, where it was performed by the BBC Symphony Orchestra and Martin Roscoe, piano. As with the later orchestral work Espace (1993), Stepping Out explores unconventional spatial possibilities in music.

Between 2002 and 2006 Marsh composed vocal settings of all fifty of the Pierrot lunaire: rondels bergamasques cycle of poems by Albert Giraud. As with his many close readings of texts by James Joyce, Marsh is interested in bringing out the meaning of the dense, symbolist texts. He has expressed dislike for modern settings of texts in which the words are inaudible.

His music is published by Chester Novello and Peters Edition, London.

== Music theatre ==
His music theatre activities began in the 1970s at York, where a group of like-minded composers - Marsh, Richard Orton, Steve Stanton and Trevor Wishart - were working with music students and staff (rather than trained actors) to stage performance works. Marsh's contributions included the solo piece Dum, performed inside a cage or at a lectern with many metal objects by (among others) Alan Belk of Vocem and the composer himself. With his wife Anna Myatt he was associated with Midland Music Theatre in Birmingham as a director and performer.

Humour and irony are important elements, as shown in a series of works derived from Old Testament stories and themes presented in contemporary terms, such as the dramatic oratorio Samson (1984 - closer in style to Japanese Noh drama than the European oratorio), the melodrama The Song of Abigail (1985) and the extended drama The Big Bang (1989) - subtitled "Tales of love and intrigue; a kaleidoscope of sex and violence".

== Audiobooks ==
For the Naxos record label Marsh has produced dramatically narrated audiobooks of Joyce's Ulysses (1994 abridged, 2004 unabridged), A Portrait of the Artist as a Young Man (1995) and Finnegans Wake (2021, unabridged), as well as three books of Dante's Divine Comedy.

== Selected works ==
- Molly for speaker, six amplified voices, ensemble, derived from Ulysses (1970)
- Cass, music theatre, female voice, flute, jug and six men, from Aeschylus (1971)
- Dum, a vocal percussive fantasy for male vocalist (1972)
- Three Hale Mairies, vocalists and ensemble (1976)
- Not a soul but ourselves (1977)
- Bits and Scraps, for four amplified voices, tape and lighting director (1979)
- Samson: a dramatic oratorio (1984), commissioned by Vocem for the Nettlefold Festival (1984)
- The Song of Abigail, melodrama (1985)
- Easy Steps, for piano (1987)
- Ferry Music, for clarinet, cello and piano (1988)
- The Big Bang - a dramatic oratorio on Old Testament texts (1989)
- Stepping Out for piano and orchestra (Proms, 1990)
- Kagura for large ensemble, influenced by Japanese Gagaku music (1991)
- A Little Snow, solo voice, text Nicanor Parra (1994)
- Espace for orchestra, Huddersfield Festival (1994)
- Waiting for Charlie, for the ensemble de ereprijs (1994)
- Sukeroku for percussion quartet (2000)
- Atsumari for Ōtsuzumi and percussion quartet (2004)
- Pierrot Lunaire: 50 Rondels Bergamasques, setting of Albert Giraud's full cycle of poems, Perugia (2007)
- Il Cor Tristo, settings from Dante's Inferno for the Hilliard Ensemble (2008)
- What Charlie Did Next for the ensemble de ereprijs, Arnhem (2009)
- Rising, music theatre (2010)
- Faust, music for BBC radio production (2010)
- Lamentations for voice, flute and percussion. York (2012)
- Poor Yorrick, settings from Tristram Shandy (2014)
- Touch and Go (2014), for pianist Catherine Laws
- Walking Away, three songs for soprano and marimba (2015)
- But Still, for soprano, viola and piano (2017)

Recordings

- Electric Phoenix, Wergo WER 60094 (1982), includes Not a soul but ourselves
- Stepping Out for piano and orchestra, BBC Symphony Orchestra, Martin Roscoe (BBC Proms 1990)
- Black Hair (from Mary Wiegold's song book), Anna Myatt with the Black Hair Ensemble (1995)
- Albert Giraud – Pierrot Lunaire, NMCD 127 (2007)
- The NMC Songbook, NMCD 150 (2009), includes Lullaby
- 20 Odd Years, FMRCD 316-0711, Jos Zwaanenburg, flutes (2011), includes Hoichi
- Crossing Ohashi Bridge, NMCD 174 (2011), Goldberg Ensemble, Malcolm Layfield, includes Canto 1
- Stories - Berio and Friends, Harmonia Mundi: HMU807527, Paul Hillier, Theatre of Voices (2011), includes Not a soul but ourselves
- Il Cor Tristo, Hilliard Ensemble, ECM 2346 (2013)
- Isang Yun Remembered, CMRC 002 (2019), includes But Still
