= George E. Nicholson Jr. =

American academic

George E. Nicholson Jr. (June 15, 1918 – December 3, 1971) was an American professor, mathematician, academic, researcher, Chairman of the UNC Department of Statistics, and Medal of Freedom recipient.

== Biography ==
Nicholson was born in Brooklyn, New York in 1918. He began his education at the University of North Carolina in Chapel Hill in 1936, where he earned a bachelor's degree in 1940 and a master's degree in 1941. From 1941 to 1943 he served as an instructor of mathematics at the Georgia Institute of Technology, and in 1944 he began teaching at UNC.

In 1944 Nicholson also began a research position at Columbia University to aid the war effort during World War II. He served with distinction as an operations analyst with the United States Air Force in Saipan. In 1947 he was awarded the Medal of Freedom by the Air Force due to his contributions.

In 1945 Nicholson continued with graduate studies at Columbia University before returning to UNC in 1946, after the Department of Mathematical Statistics was formed. He received his Ph.D. in 1948 and was named associate professor.

== Career ==
Nicholson was named an associate professor at UNC in 1952 and was named the Chair of the Department of Statistics, a position he held for 19 years until his death in 1971. In 1956 he became a full professor. Much of Nicholson's work focused on promoting inter-institutional cooperation as well as general teaching of statistics and mathematics. From 1965 until his death, he served on the Survey Committee of the Conference Board of Mathematical Sciences. He also served on the Panel on Statistics of the Committee of the Undergraduate Program in Mathematics. Nicholson was also involved with the Cultural Exchange Program of the United States State Department, and helped found the first Department of Statistics in Japan at Nihon University. In 1965 he was awarded the Department of the Air Force Decoration for Exceptional Civilian Service for his consultancy work with the Air Force.

Nicholson served as the Secretary of the Institute of Mathematical Statistics from 1955–1962, and as Executive Secretary from 1962–1967. He was a founding member of the Operations Research Society of America.

== Impact and influence ==
- The University of North Carolina created the "Nicholson Scholarship Fund for Operations Research", which funds support scholarship awards to graduate students in Operations Research
- INFORMS' "George Nicholson Student Paper Competition", which "identifies and honors outstanding papers in the field of operations research and the management sciences written by a student."
