= Strugnell's Haiku =

Three songs for voice and piano by Colin Matthews

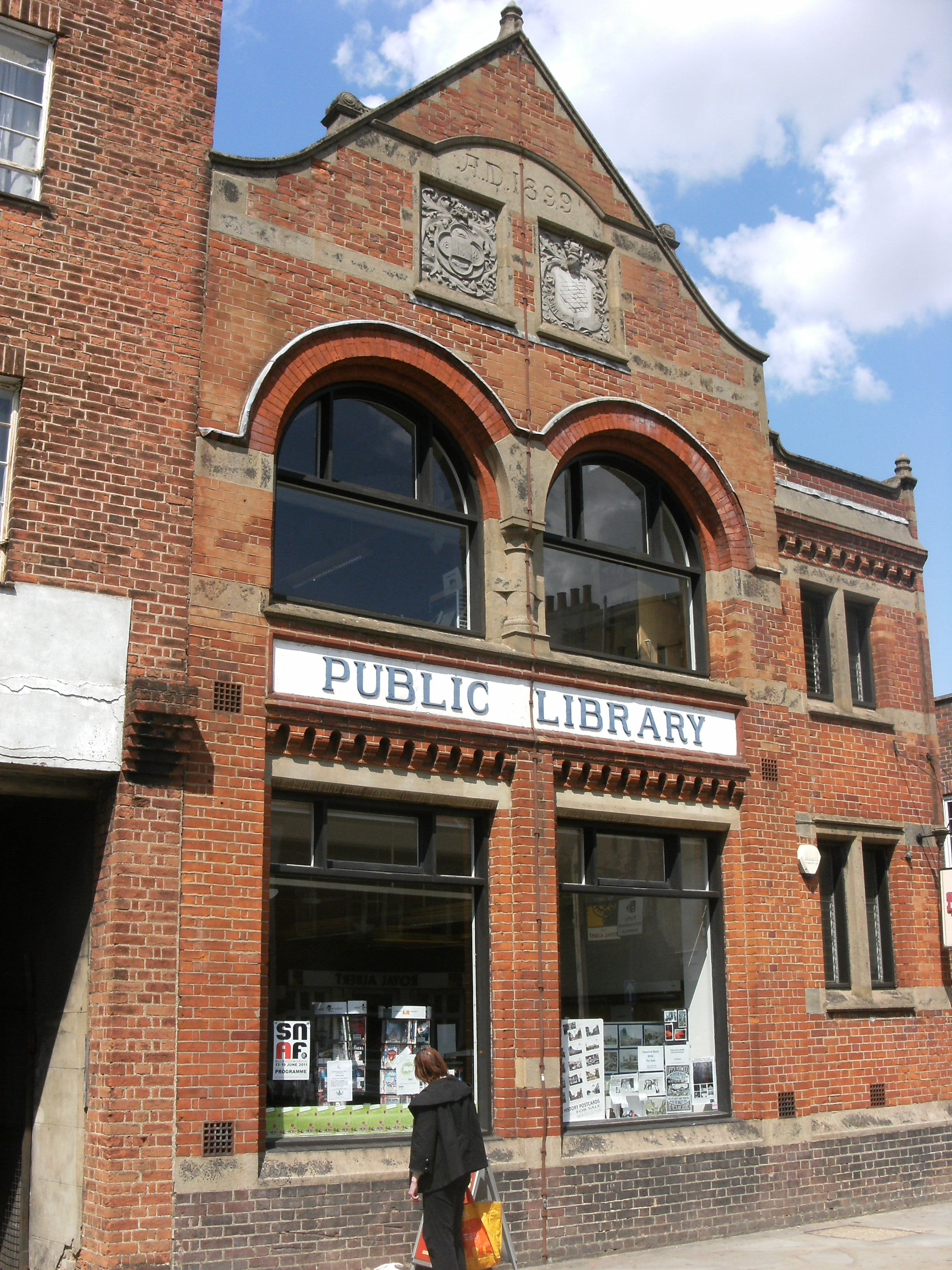
Upper Norwood Library, possibly the work location of the poet Jason Strugnell

Strugnell's Haiku is a collection of three songs for voice and piano by the composer Colin Matthews, set to haiku poems by Jason Strugnell, an alter ego of the poet Wendy Cope.

== Texts ==
The texts cover the angst of living in South London, the abode of the fictional Strugnell, who lived in Tulse Hill and worked at Norwood library, and whose work shows the influence of a number of poets, including Ted Hughes, Craig Raine and James Elroy Flecker. The poems were originally published in Cope's collection Making Cocoa for Kingsley Amis. The haiku touch on various experiences in the poet's life. The first of Strugnell's Three Haiku is a eulogy to cherry blossom, which the poet thinks "looks really nice". In the second haiku, the poet laments his imminent baldness, comparing it to the seasonal fallen leaves and snow. In the last haiku, describing a November evening, the poet notes that "the pubs are open".

== Music ==
Matthews's settings of the first two haiku are essentially pentatonic in melody and harmony. The first haiku is marked by Matthews as "with fervour, but soon becoming gentle and introspective"; the second as "delicate: like porcelain." In the second haiku the time signature of the bars moves twice sequentially from 1/16 to 7/16 and then down to 1/16 again. The third haiku, (marked "sombre but visceral"), in 3/8, is set against cavernous perfect fifths in the bass.

== Performances ==
The songs were first publicly performed by Linda Hirst, accompanied by Julian Jacobson, on 14 December 1989 at the British Music Information Centre, London. It had been previously broadcast by the BBC on 15 September, the accompanist then being John Lenehan. The work also exists in an alternative arrangement for voice and ensemble of E-flat clarinet (doubling bass clarinet), viola (doubling three tam-tams ad lib.), cello and double bass. In this latter form, it was recorded as part of Mary Wiegold's Songbook by The Composers Ensemble conducted by Dominic Muldowney, with Wiegold herself taking the voice part; a complete performance takes approximately 3 minutes 30 seconds.
