= Graham Fitkin =

British composer, pianist and conductor

- Born: 19 April 1963 (age 63); Crows-an-Wra, Cornwall
- Occupations: Composer, musician
- Era: Contemporary
- Partner: Ruth Wall

Graham Fitkin (born 19 April 1963) is a British composer, pianist and conductor. His compositions fall broadly into the minimalist and postminimalist genres. Described by The Independent in 1998 as "one of the most important of our younger composers", he is particularly known for his works for solo and multiple pianos, as well as for music accompanying dance.

== Biography ==
Fitkin was born at Crows-an-Wra in west Cornwall on 19 April 1963. His mother, a piano teacher, encouraged his early studies on that instrument. He participated in numerous local ensembles during his childhood, and recalls starting to compose at the piano aged around 8. In 1981–4, he attended the University of Nottingham, where he studied with composers Nigel Osborne and Peter Nelson, among others. He later went to the Netherlands to study with the minimalist composer and pianist Louis Andriessen at the Royal Conservatory of The Hague. In 1987, he moved to London.

Fitkin returned to Cornwall in 1991 and, as of 2010, lives in Treen. His partner is harpist Ruth Wall, with whom he collaborates in Fitkin Wall.

== Music ==
Fitkin's work is broadly classified as minimalist and postminimalist. His works are tonal and frequently complex. Much of his writing is for the piano, including solo and multiple player works. Fitkin lists his early classical influences as Igor Stravinsky, Anton Webern, Pierre Boulez and the American minimalist Steve Reich, and also acknowledges a broad range of influences outside the field of classical music, from jazz musicians Keith Jarrett, Muggsy Spanier and Miles Davis, and popular singer Frank Sinatra, to modern pop groups such as The Smiths, Wire and the Pet Shop Boys. Subsequent influences include Louis Andriessen, Gavin Bryars and Laurence Crane.

Fitkin's earliest compositions were for piano, including From Yellow to Yellow and The Cone Gatherers. The Nanquidno group, which he co-founded in 1985, consisted of four pianists using two keyboards. Several of his early works, including Log, Line and Loud, were composed for the six-piano ensemble, Piano Circus. He has also written several works for pianist Kathryn Stott, including Circuit for two pianos and orchestra, which was composed for Stott and Noriko Ogawa in 2002 to a commission from the BBC.

The success of his early compositions for piano, particularly The Cone Gatherers, led to Fitkin being commissioned to write his first ensemble work, Cud, for jazz orchestra. Cud and Fitkin's other early ensemble works including Hook and Stub often make use of electronic instruments and percussion, and are influenced by jazz and rock. A more recent work for electronic instruments is the album Kaplan, which was inspired by the character George Kaplan from Alfred Hitchcock's film, North by Northwest. In 1994–96, Fitkin was the composer-in-residence at the Royal Liverpool Philharmonic, and during the mid-to-late 1990s he composed twelve orchestral pieces including a clarinet concerto. He has composed several works for musical theatre, including the short opera Ghosts, and has also written or adapted several pieces for contemporary dance, including Huoah.

Recent projects include Still Warm, a work for multiple harps, which was composed for the Eden Project in 2006. The sextet Sinew, written for the Fibonacci Sequence, was first performed in 2009. For Yo Yo Ma, he has written a cello concerto which was premiered at the 2011 BBC Proms, as well as a work for cello and piano, titled L, composed for the performer's fiftieth birthday (2005). A BBC commission for orchestra and chorus, titled PK, was also premiered at the Proms in 2010. In a recent project called Fitkin, a group comprising 9 virtuoso musicians has been touring the UK since early 2010. In December 2010, it was announced that Fitkin had been selected as one of twenty composers to participate in the New Music 20x12 project as part of the London 2012 Cultural Olympiad. Fitkin will compose a new work for the London Chamber Orchestra to be premiered in 2012.

In 1996, he formed the Graham Fitkin Group. His work has been released by Decca's Argo label, Sanctuary's Black Box label, BIS Records and Factory Classical. He founded a personal label, GFR, to release Still Warm.

== Awards ==
In 1994, Fitkin won the International Grand Prix Music for Dance Video Award. He has twice won British Composer Awards: in 2009, Reel won the Stage Works category; in 2011, PK won the Outreach category.

== Selected works ==
Solo and multiple pianos

- From Yellow to Yellow (1985)
- The Cone Gatherers (1987)
- Loud (1989), for six pianos
- Flak (1989), for two pianos/eight hands
- Log (1990), for six pianos
- Line (1991), for six pianos
- Fervent (1992–94)
- Piano Pieces 93 (1993)
- Relent (1998)

Piano and orchestra

- Granite (1995)
- Circuit (2002)
- Ruse (2009)

Orchestral

- Cud (1988)
- Length (1994)
- Bebeto (1995)
- Henry (1995)
- Metal (1995)
- Clarinet Concerto (1998)
- Reel (2008)
- PK (2010), with choir
- Cello Concerto (2011)
- Recorder Concerto (2017)

Ensemble

- Ironic (1997)
- Bed (1998)
- Beethoven 7 (2000)

String Quartets

- Servant (1992)
- A Small Quartet (1993)
- Another Small Quartet (1994)
- Pawn (2004)
- Inside (2006)
- String (2007)

Other

- Huoah (1988), for brass band; rewritten as ballet score (1995)
- Slow (1990), for string quartet and two keyboards
- Hook (1991), for percussion quartet
- Skirting (2001), for solo guitar
- Lens (2003), for piano trio
- Geography (2004), for computers and video
- Kaplan (2004), multimedia
- L (2005), for cello and piano
- Touch (2005), piano quintet
- Still Warm (2006), for electronically manipulated harps
- Sinew (2009), sextet for violin, viola, cello, clarinet, horn and piano
- Distil (2014), string quartet and percussion
- Recur (2016), string quartet and harp
- Loosening (2021), string quartet and soprano saxophone

=== Partial discography ===
- Skirting, Jim and Pam and Pam and Jim on The Uncommon Harp (compilation) – Ruth Wall
- Ironic, and other ensemble works – Graham Fitkin Group
- Granite – Peter Donohoe (piano), Petr Altrichter and Graham Fitkin (conductors), Royal Liverpool Philharmonic
- Flak, and other piano works – various (Factory Classical; 1991)
- Slow, Huoah, Frame – Smith Quartet (Argo; 1992)
- Log, Line, Loud – Piano Circus (Argo; 1992)
- Hook, Mesh, Stub, Cud – various (Argo; 1993)
- Kaplan – Graham Fitkin and Ruth Wall (Black Box; 2003)
- Hook, Mesh, Stub, Cud, Log, Line, Loud, Hard Fairy – various (Decca; 2004)
- Still Warm – Fitkin Wall (GFR; 2007)
- Circuit, Relent, Carnal, and other piano works – Noriko Ogawa and Kathryn Stott (piano), Naoto Otomo (conductor), Tokyo Symphony Orchestra (BIS Records; 2010)
- String Quartets – Sacconi Quartet, Signum Classics SIGCD518 (2017)
- Loosening, Slow, Distil, Touch, Recur – Sacconi Quartet and soloists, Signum Classics SIGCD792 (2024)
