= Wendy Cope =

English poet (born 1945)

Wendy Cope OBE
- Born: 21 July 1945 (age 81); Erith, Kent, England
- Education: West Lodge Preparatory School, Sidcup, Kent; Farrington's School, Chislehurst, Kent; St Hilda's College, Oxford
- Occupation: Poet
- Spouse: Lachlan Mackinnon
- Writing career
- Period: 1980–present
- Notable works: Making Cocoa for Kingsley Amis; Serious Concerns
- Notable awards: Cholmondeley Award; 1987; American Academy of Arts and Letters; 1995; Michael Braude Award for Light Verse; 1995

Wendy Cope OBE (born 21 July 1945) is a contemporary English poet. She read history at St Hilda's College, Oxford. She now lives in Ely, Cambridgeshire, with her husband, the poet Lachlan Mackinnon.

== Biography ==
Cope was born in Erith in Kent (now in the London Borough of Bexley), where her father Fred Cope was manager of the local department store, Hedley Mitchell. She was educated at West Lodge Preparatory School in Sidcup and Farrington's School, Chislehurst, both in Kent. After graduating from St Hilda's College and Westminster College, Oxford, Cope spent fourteen years as a primary-school teacher. In 1981, she became Arts and Reviews editor for the Inner London Education Authority magazine, Contact. Five years later, she became a freelance writer and was a television critic for The Spectator magazine, until 1990.

Five collections of her adult poetry have been published: Making Cocoa for Kingsley Amis in 1986, Serious Concerns in 1992, If I Don't Know in 2001, Family Values in 2011, and Anecdotal Evidence in 2018. Cope has also edited several anthologies of comic verse and was a judge of the 2007 Man Booker Prize.

She was elected a Fellow of the Royal Society of Literature in 1992.

In 1998, she was voted the listeners' choice in a BBC Radio 4 poll to succeed Ted Hughes as Poet Laureate. When Andrew Motion's term as Poet Laureate came to an end in 2009, Cope was again widely considered a popular candidate, although she believes the post should be discontinued. Carol Ann Duffy succeeded Motion as Poet Laureate.

Cope was appointed Officer of the Order of the British Empire (OBE) in the 2010 Birthday Honours. In April 2011, the British Library purchased Cope's archive including manuscripts, school reports and 40,000 emails, the largest email archive they have bought to date. The papers also include 67 poetry notebooks and unpublished poems. Cope commented: "I wanted to find a good home for my archive. The timing was dictated because we had to move home, so we needed some money to buy a house, and the space. So this was the moment. I asked Andrew Motion what I should do, and he told me someone to approach at the British Library. I wasn't sure they would want it, but they did." When the collection is catalogued and organised, the archive will be available to researchers.

In 2013, after 19 years of living together, Cope married Lachlan Mackinnon in a register office, although she has stated that she would have preferred a civil partnership.

In January 2019, Cope was the guest on BBC Radio 4's long-running programme Desert Island Discs. Her book choice was The Compleet Molesworth by Geoffrey Willans, her luxury item was writing materials and her favourite music track was Bach's "Concerto for Two Violins and Strings in D minor".

== Critical reception ==
Despite Cope's slight output, her books have sold well and she has attracted a popular following with her lighthearted, often comical poetry, as well as achieving literary credibility, winning two awards and making an award shortlist over a fourteen-year period. She has a keen eye for the everyday, mundane aspects of English life, especially the desires, frustrations, hopes, confusions and emotions in intimate relationships. Dr Rowan Williams is a well known fan of her work, writing that: "Wendy Cope is without doubt the wittiest of contemporary English poets, and says a lot of extremely serious things". In 2021, the poet and critic Rory Waterman published the first critical book on her work, for the "Writers and Their Work" series (Liverpool University Press).

Three haikus from Making Cocoa for Kingsley Amis, where they are presented as being written by the (fictional) Tulse Hill poet Jason Strugnell, were set by the composer Colin Matthews in 1990 as Strugnell's Haiku.

In 2008, Cope's poem "After The Lunch" was used as the lyric of the song "Waterloo Bridge" by jazz composer and musician Jools Holland and singer Louise Marshall.

== Progression of style ==
Wendy Cope's style progression spans nearly fifty years. While she has released more than two dozen publications, her most well-known works are her five intermittent poetry collections: Making Cocoa for Kingsley Amis (1986), Serious Concerns (1992), If I Don’t Know (2001), Family Values (2011), and Anecdotal Evidence (2018). The changes in both her writing style and life can be tracked in these five collections.

Cope acknowledges that the first two are quite different from the latter three. She claims this is due to the major role played by her happiness in her writing, and that her first two collections were written when she was fairly unhappy. Both collections' poems vary in content, but are similar in structure. Generally, each poem features a lighthearted tone with punchline jokes and a dry, compressed wit. The punchline is often "centered on men from the point of view of the single heterosexual woman". Paired with an admiration for life and the mundane, the collections garnered Cope popularity. Cope's style and humour became so consistent that both fans and critics alike began to label pieces written in this style as "Wendy Cope poems" – anthems for "several generations of frustrated and conflicted women". This style was admired for neat rhyme schemes, humorous observations, and unexpected politically charged strikes at concepts like marriage or the patriarchy.

The following three publications are notably darker. They have also been less popular. The wild success of Serious Concerns in the 1990s changed Cope's life entirely. Newfound money and resources allowed her to quit teaching, dedicate herself to writing, and begin living with Mackinnon, whom she later married, in 2013. As her happiness increased, her poetry changed. Free verse poems with darker tones replaced light-hearted rhyme. Cope's allusions to her battles with depression, a theme present in all of her work, grew more frequent. The freedom of success allowed Cope to focus on more thorny issues.

Serious Concerns stands as Cope's most popular book, even thirty years later. One top-ten list of "must read" Cope poems has all top five poems as coming from her first two collections. However, Cope herself disagrees with the concept of a "Wendy Cope anthem". Cope's favourite of her own works is Anecdotal Evidence. Her favourite of her own poems is "Flowers" from Serious Concerns.

Her domestic love poem 'The Orange' became increasingly viral from 2018, leading to Faber & Faber releasing a line of accompanying merchandise for it, and publishing a new edition of her works in 2023, entitled The Orange and other poems.

== Bibliography ==
=== Poetry collections for adults ===
- (1986) Making Cocoa for Kingsley Amis (Faber and Faber)
- (1992) Serious Concerns (Faber and Faber)
- (2001) If I Don't Know (Faber and Faber)
- (2011) Family Values (Faber and Faber)
- (2018) Anecdotal Evidence (Faber and Faber)
- (2024) Collected Poems (Faber and Faber)

=== Poetry collections for children ===
- (1988) Twiddling Your Thumbs (Faber and Faber)
- (1991) The River Girl (Faber and Faber)

=== Limited editions and selections ===
- (1980) Across the City [limited edition] (Priapus Press)
- (1984) Hope and the 42 (Other Branch Readings)[limited edition 100 copies]
- (1986) Poem from a Colour Chart of House Paints [limited edition] (Priapus Press)
- (1988) Does She Like Word Games? (Anvil Press Poetry)
- (1988) Men and Their Boring Arguments (Wykeham)
- (1994) The Squirrel and the Crow (Prospero Poets)
- (1998) Being Boring [limited edition 180 copies] ( Arialia Press)
- (2008) Two Cures for Love: Selected Poems 1979–2006 (Faber and Faber)
- (2016) A Triumphant Yes Celandine Press 150 copies signed by the author
- (2023) The Orange and other poems (Faber and Faber)

=== Other publications ===
- (1982) Poetry Introduction 5 (Faber and Faber)
- (1989) Is That the New Moon? [editor] (HarperCollins)
- (1993) The Orchard Book of Funny Poems [editor] (Orchard)
- (1996) Casting a Spell [contributor] (Faber and Faber)
- (1998) The Funny Side: 101 Humorous Poems [editor] (Faber and Faber)
- (1999) The Faber Book of Bedtime Stories [editor] (Faber and Faber)
- (2000) The Orchard Book of Funny Poems [editor] (Orchard)
- (2001) Heaven on Earth: 101 Happy Poems [editor] (Faber and Faber)
- (2002) Is That The New Moon?: Poems by Women Poets [selector] (Collins)
- (2002) Flora McDonnell, ed., Threads of Hope: Learning to Live with Depression (Short Books, 2003, ISBN 978-1-904095-35-4), with contributions by Wendy Cope, Margaret Drabble, Andrew Solomon, Virginia Ironside, Lewis Wolpert, Alastair Campbell, and Kay Redfield Jamison
- (2003) George Herbert: Verse and Prose [selector and introduction] (SPCK)
- (2014) Life, Love and The Archers: recollections, reviews and other prose (Hodder & Stoughton)
