= Australian Mathematical Sciences Institute =

Research institutes in Australia

Coordinates: 37°47′54″S 144°57′44″E

The Australian Mathematical Sciences Institute (AMSI) was established in 2002 for collaboration in the mathematical sciences to strengthen mathematics and statistics, especially in universities.

The Fields Institute and the Pacific Institute for the Mathematical Sciences have influenced AMSI's structure and operations.

AMSI has a membership that includes most Australian universities, CSIRO, the Australian Bureau of Statistics, the Bureau of Meteorology and the Defence Science and Technology Organisation. AMSI is located on the Parkville campus of the University of Melbourne.

== Activities ==
AMSI pursues its mission through its three key program areas:

- School Education
- Research & Higher Education
- Industry, Business & Government

=== School education program ===
AMSI's School Education program was established in 2004 under the International Centre of Excellence for Education in Mathematics (ICE-EM). Through ICE-EM, a sequence of mathematics texts, teacher resources, and professional development for school years 5–10 were developed.

In 2009, the Department of Education, Employment and Workplace Relations provided funding for the extension of ICE-EM activities under the Improving Mathematics Education in Schools (TIMES) project. This funded an expansion of the teaching professional development program across Australia, the development of teacher resource modules for years 5–10, and Maths: Make your career count—a suite of materials to promote careers in mathematics.

In work by Frank Barrington and Peter Brown, ICE-EM collected and published data on national enrolments in mathematics at year 12 and made a careful state-by-state comparison of year 12 curricula.

=== Research & higher education program ===
AMSI operates multiple Research and Higher Education programs to improve mathematical education and research in Australia.

==== ACE network ====
The ACE network offers a range of online honours and masters level courses to supplement the range of subjects in university.

==== Summer school ====
AMSI operates a yearly summer school, in which honour and postgraduate students study short courses in the summer. It is hosted by a number of Australian universities.

==== Research ====
The AMSI Research Program expands and improves the mathematical sciences research base in Australia. The program promotes collaboration between member institutions and with international researchers and gives students at member institutions networking opportunities.

AMSI provides workshop sponsorship allocated through its Scientific Advisory Committee to AMSI members. AMSI also sponsors annual AMSI Lecturers and the Australian MS Mahler Lecturer.

Funding from the Department of Education, Science and Training enabled the establishment of the AMSI Access Grid Room (AGR) network. The AGR network facilitates distributed lectures, teaching, and research. A national program of collaborative teaching of advanced mathematics at honors level at multiple remote sites is now established.

=== Industry, business and government program ===
AMSI highlights the relevance of mathematics to industry through wide-ranging industry-linked activities including:

- AMSI's internship program
- Industry workshops
- Mathematical and statistical consulting services

The activities showcase the benefits of using mathematical tools in business, industry and government.

==== AMSI Intern ====
AMSI Intern is a national program that links postgraduate students and their university supervisors across all disciplines with industry partners through short-term 4-5 month tightly focused partner research internships. The postgraduate student is supported by an academic mentor from the host university throughout the internship placement period.

== Members ==
=== Full members ===
- Australian National University
- La Trobe University
- Monash University
- Queensland University of Technology
- RMIT University
- University of Melbourne
- University of Queensland
- University of New South Wales
- University of Newcastle
- University of Sydney
- University of Adelaide
- University of Western Australia

=== Associate members ===
- Charles Sturt University
- Curtin University of Technology
- Deakin University
- James Cook University
- Flinders University
- Griffith University
- Macquarie University
- Queensland University of Technology
- Swinburne University of Technology
- University of Ballarat
- University of Canberra
- University of New England
- University of South Australia
- University of Southern Queensland
- University of Tasmania
- University of Technology Sydney
- University of Wollongong
- Western Sydney University

=== Society and agency members ===
- Australian Bureau of Statistics
- Australian Mathematical Society and ANZIAM
- Australian Mathematics Trust
- Australian Institute of Physics
- ATSIMA
- Bureau of Meteorology
- CORE Inc
- CSIRO
- DST Group
- Geoscience Australia
- MERGA
- New Zealand Mathematical Society
- Office of the Chief Scientist
- Statistical Society of Australia
- The New Zealand Statistical Association
- The Mathematical Association of Victoria

=== Industry members ===
- Citadel Securities
- Jane Street
- Optiver
