= Colin Matthews =

English composer

Colin Matthews, OBE (born 13 February 1946) is an English composer of contemporary classical music. Noted for his large-scale orchestral compositions, Matthews is also a prolific arranger of other composer's music, including works by Berlioz, Britten, Dowland, Mahler, Purcell and Schubert. Other arrangements include orchestrations of all Debussy's 24 Préludes, both books of Debussy's Images, and two movements—Oiseaux tristes and La vallée des cloches—from Ravel's Miroirs. Having received a doctorate from University of Sussex on the works of Mahler, from 1964–1975 Matthews worked with his brother David Matthews and musicologist Deryck Cooke on completing a performance version of Mahler's Tenth Symphony.

== Early life and education ==
Matthews was born in London in 1946; his older brother is the composer David Matthews. He read classics at the University of Nottingham, and then studied composition there with Arnold Whittall, and at the same time with Nicholas Maw. In the 1970s he taught at the University of Sussex, where he obtained a doctorate for his work on Mahler, an offshoot of his long collaboration with Deryck Cooke on the performing version of Mahler's Tenth Symphony. During this period he also worked at Aldeburgh with Benjamin Britten and Imogen Holst. His music has been published principally by Faber Music since 1976.

== Career ==
In 1975 his orchestral Fourth Sonata (written 1974–75) won the Scottish National Orchestra's Ian Whyte Award. Subsequent orchestral works include the widely performed Night Music (1976), Sonata No. 5: Landscape (1977–81), and a First Cello Concerto, commissioned by the BBC for the 1984 Proms: these last two have been recorded by Unicorn-Kanchana. In 1989 Cortège was given its first performance by the Orchestra of the Royal Opera House under Bernard Haitink, and Quatrain by the London Symphony Orchestra and Michael Tilson Thomas. This was the first of a series of LSO commissions, followed by Machines and Dreams for their 1991 Childhood Festival, Memorial in 1993 with Mstislav Rostropovich as conductor, and a Second Cello Concerto for Rostropovich in 1996. In 1990 he made a setting of three comic poems by Wendy Cope, Strugnell's Haiku. Matthews was Associate Composer with the LSO from 1992 until 1999. The orchestral version of Hidden Variables was a joint commission for the LSO and the New World Symphony Orchestra, who gave the American première in Miami under Michael Tilson Thomas in 1992; in the same year the Cleveland Orchestra gave the American première of Machines and Dreams. Collins Classics released a CD of Matthews' LSO commissions in 1996 to celebrate his 50th birthday.

The BBC commission Broken Symmetry was first performed by its dedicatees, the BBC Symphony Orchestra under Oliver Knussen, in March 1992, and repeated at the 1992 Proms. It was recorded in 1994, together with the Fourth Sonata and Suns Dance, by Deutsche Grammophon (a Grammy Award nomination); and it forms the third part of the huge choral/orchestral Renewal, commissioned by the BBC for the 50th anniversary of Radio 3 in September 1996. Renewal received the 1997 Royal Philharmonic Society Award for large-scale composition. The Dutch première of Cortège was given in December 1998 by the Concertgebouw Orchestra under Riccardo Chailly. The ballet score Hidden Variables, incorporating a new orchestral work, Unfolded Order, was commissioned by the Royal Ballet for the reopening of the Royal Opera House in December 1999, with choreography by Ashley Page.

Colin Matthews' chamber music includes six string quartets, two oboe quartets, a Divertimento for double string quartet (1982), and a substantial body of piano music. Between 1985 and 1994 he completed six major works for ensemble: Suns Dance for the London Sinfonietta (1985, reworked for the Royal Ballet as Pursuit), Two Part Invention (1987), The Great Journey (1981–88)—re-released on NMC—Contraflow, commissioned by the London Sinfonietta for the 1992 Huddersfield Festival, and two commissions for the Birmingham Contemporary Music Group, Hidden Variables (1989) and ...through the glass (1994), the latter given its first performance under Simon Rattle, who also conducted it in 1998 at the Proms and in Salzburg. Matthews' music was featured at the Almeida Festival in 1988, at the Bath Festival in 1990, at Tanglewood where he has been visiting composer many times since 1988, at the 1998 Suntory Summer Festival in Tokyo, at the 2003 Avanti! Festival in Finland, and the 2004 Berlin Festival.

The year 2000 saw four major premières: Two Tributes for the London Sinfonietta; Pluto, an addition to Holst's Planets, for the Hallé Orchestra and Kent Nagano, now widely performed; Aftertones, for the Huddersfield Choral Society; and Continuum, a large-scale work for soprano and ensemble commissioned by the Birmingham Contemporary Music Group for Cynthia Clarey and Simon Rattle, with performances in London, Cologne, Brussels, Amsterdam, Vienna and Birmingham. In the spring of 2001 the Philharmonia orchestra gave the first performance of Matthews' Horn Concerto, with Richard Watkins and Esa-Pekka Salonen. Also in 2001 he was commissioned to write a Fanfare to open the BBC Proms. Reflected Images, for Michael Tilson Thomas and the San Francisco Symphony Orchestra, received its première in October 2003.

Colin Matthews' 60th birthday was marked by 5 performances given at the 2006 BBC Proms. Recent works have included Berceuse for Dresden, written for the rebuilt Frauenkirche in Dresden and first performed there in November 2005 with the cellist Jan Vogler and the New York Philharmonic under Lorin Maazel; and Turning Point, commissioned by the Concertgebouw Orchestra and given by them under Markus Stenz in January 2007. His Violin Concerto was given by Leila Josefowicz and the City of Birmingham Symphony Orchestra under Oliver Knussen in September 2009.

From 2001 to 2010 Matthews was Associate Composer with the Hallé Orchestra, and is now their Composer Emeritus. During this period he wrote a number of works for them, as well as a project involving the orchestration of all 24 of Debussy's Preludes, completed in May 2007 and recorded by Sir Mark Elder on the Hallé label. Alphabicycle Order, a major work for children's chorus, narrator and orchestra to poems by Christopher Reid, was premiered by the Hallé under Edward Gardner as part of the 2007 Manchester International Festival, and is also recorded on the Hallé label, together with the Horn Concerto. Commissioned by the Hallé Orchestra as part of their Mahler centenary celebrations, his Crossing the Alps for Chorus and Organ, on a text by William Wordsworth (The Prelude, Book VI), was first performed by the Hallé Choir, conducted by Markus Stenz, at the Bridgewater Hall, Manchester, in January 2010. Its German premiere, also under Stenz, was in the Philharmonie in Cologne, in January 2011, with the MDR Radio Chorus.

Three works were premiered in 2011 : Night Rides for the London Sinfonietta; No Man’s Land, to a text by Christopher Reid, for the City of London Sinfonia with soloists Ian Bostridge and Roderick Williams; and Grand Barcarolle for the Leipzig Gewandhaus Orchestra and Riccardo Chailly as part of their Beethoven cycle presented in Leipzig, Vienna, Paris and London in autumn 2011. No Man’s Land won the 2012 British Composer Award for vocal music. Matthews' Fourth Quartet was given its first performance by the Elias Quartet at the Wigmore Hall in November 2012 and won the 2013 British Composer Award for chamber music. Nowhere to Hide for piano trio was premiered at the 2013 Cheltenham Festival by the Schubert Ensemble. His work Traces Remain, which takes its name and inspiration from a book of essays by Charles Nicholl, was premiered on 8 January 2014 at the Barbican Centre, London by the BBC Symphony Orchestra conducted by Sakari Oramo, and was broadcast live by BBC Radio 3.

In 2014 he wrote Spiralling for Spira Mirabilis, The Pied Piper of Hamelin to words by Michael Morpurgo for the London Philharmonic Orchestra and Vladimir Jurowski, and a Fifth String Quartet for the 75th anniversary of Tanglewood. More recently Matthews has focused on works for voice and ensemble - A Land of Rain (2017) to words by Nicholas Moore and Baudelaire for the Birmingham Contemporary Music Group, As Time Returns (2018) to words by Ivan Blatný for the London Sinfonietta and Seascapes (2020) to words by Sidney Keyes for the Nash Ensemble.

Music written during the lockdown period (2020 - 22) includes Mosaics for orchestra, first performed by the London Symphony Orchestra in May 2023; an arrangement for piano trio of Beethoven’s Fifth Symphony commissioned by Leonidas Kavakos, YoYo Ma and Emanuel Ax and recorded by them in 2022; and an opera in collaboration with William Boyd, A Visit to Friends, for first performance at the 2025 Aldeburgh Festival.

Matthews and his wife Belinda, a former publishing executive at Faber and Faber, have three children, Jessie, Dan and Lucy.

== NMC Recordings ==
He is founder and Executive Producer of NMC Recordings, and has also produced recordings for Deutsche Grammophon, Virgin Classics, Conifer, Collins, Bridge, BMG, Continuum, Metronome and Elektra Nonesuch (Górecki's Third Symphony, for which he received a Grammy nomination).

== Administrative work ==
He is active as administrator of the Holst Foundation, was Chair of the Britten Estate for many years, and is Music Director and Joint President of Britten-Pears Arts. He was a Council Member of the Aldeburgh Foundation from 1983 to 1994, and retains close links with the Aldeburgh Festival and the Britten-Pears School, particularly as co-director with Oliver Knussen of the Contemporary Composition and Performance Course, which they founded in 1992. He was a member of the Council of the Society for the Promotion of New Music for over 20 years, and a director of the Performing Right Society from 1992 to 1995. Since 1985 he has been a member of the Music Panel of the Radclffe Trust. He was an Executive Council Member of the Royal Philharmonic Society from 2005 until 2019.

== Honours ==
In 1998 Colin Matthews was awarded an honorary doctorate by the University of Nottingham, where he was made honorary professor in 2005. In view of the University's decision to close the Music Department he returned those honours in 2026. He is currently Prince Consort Professor of Music at the Royal College of Music, where he was made FRCM in 2007, and distinguished visiting fellow in composition at the University of Manchester. He was a governor of the Royal Northern College of Music (where he is FRNCM) from 2001 to 2008. In 2010 he was made an Honorary Member of the Royal Academy of Music. He was presented with the Royal Philharmonic Society/Performing Right Society Leslie Boosey Award in 2005, honouring an individual who has made an outstanding contribution to the furtherance of contemporary music in Britain; and the Gramophone 2017 Special Achievement Award in recognition of his work for NMC.

He was appointed Officer of the Order of the British Empire (OBE) in the 2011 New Year Honours for services to music.

In 2024 Matthews was nominated for an Ivor Novello Award at The Ivors Classical Awards. Mosaics was nominated for Best Orchestral Composition.

== Sources ==
- Thomas, Christopher (2004). "Recording of the Month: Colin Matthews (b. 1946): Sonata No. 5, Landscape; Cello Concerto No. 1; Hidden Variables; Memorial; Quatrain; Machines and Dreams". MusicWeb International. (Retrieved on 27 December 2007.)
- Wright, David (1995). "Review of Recording of 'Fourth Sonata; Suns Dance; Broken Symmetry'". The Musical Times. 136 (1833): 607. doi:10.2307/1003502. JSTOR 1003502.
- Wright, David C.H. (2001). "Matthews, Colin". Grove Music Online. Oxford, England: Oxford University Press. doi:10.1093/gmo/9781561592630.article.46017. ISBN 978-1-56159-263-0. (subscription, Wikilibrary access, or UK public library membership required)
