= Radius (music ensemble) =

Radius is a London music ensemble founded in 2007 by the British composer Tim Benjamin. The ensemble specialises in the performance of new music from around the world (though primarily in the Western classical music tradition) written by living composers and 20th-century masters. The ensemble's artistic director is the British composer Ian Vine, a contemporary of Tim Benjamin at the Royal Northern College of Music from 1994 to 1997. Modelled on the 1960s ensemble The Fires of London, (which in turn was derived from the instrumentation of Schoenberg's Pierrot Lunaire), the core instrumental line-up of Radius is flute, clarinet, violin, cello, piano, and percussion. To this instrumentation have been added trumpet, trombone, French horn, actors, and vocalists, as required for the performance of specific works.

Although Radius is usually unconducted, the ensemble was conducted by John Traill (musician) for performances of Tim Benjamin's The Corley Conspiracy at London's Southbank Centre in September 2007, directed by Sean Starke. Radius has performed at the Purcell Room at the Southbank Centre in London, the Wigmore Hall in London, and the Holywell Music Room in Oxford.

== World Premieres ==
Radius has given the world premieres of the following works:

- Ian Vine: underpaintings (2005), Wigmore Hall, London, 20 April 2007
- Tim Benjamin: Five Bagatelles (2006), Wigmore Hall, London, 20 April 2007
- Tim Benjamin / Sean Starke: The Corley Conspiracy (2007), Southbank Centre, London, 19 September 2007
- Ian Vine: X (2007), Wigmore Hall, London, 8 January 2008
- Tim Benjamin: Three Portraits (2007), Wigmore Hall, London, 8 January 2008
- Laurence Crane: Simon 10 Holt 50 (2007), Wigmore Hall, London, 8 January 2008 †
- Anthony Gilbert: ecco Eco (2007), Wigmore Hall, London, 8 January 2008 †
- Paul Newland: time quivers (2007), Wigmore Hall, London, 8 January 2008 †
- Larry Goves: riviniana (2007), Wigmore Hall, London, 8 January 2008 †
- Ian Vine: fifty objects (2007), Wigmore Hall, London, 8 January 2008 †
- Tim Benjamin: In Memoriam Tape Recorder (2007), Wigmore Hall, London, 8 January 2008
- Ian Vine: Gesso (2008), Southbank Centre, London, 25 May 2008
- Tim Benjamin: The Rosenhan Experiment (2008), Southbank Centre, London, 25 May 2008

† These works were performed in celebration of the 50th birthday of British composer Simon Holt.
