= Sam Hayden =

English composer (born 1968)

- Born: 1968 (age 57–58); Portsmouth, England
- Education: University of Sussex, Columbia University, Royal Conservatory of The Hague
- Occupations: Composer, academic
- Employer: Trinity Laban Conservatoire of Music and Dance
- Known for: Contemporary classical and electronic music, co-founder of [rout ensemble
- Notable work: Collateral Damage, Substratum, Transience
- Awards: Benjamin Britten International Competition (1995), Gaudeamus International Young Composers' Meeting (1998), Christoph Delz Foundation Competition (2003)

Sam Hayden (born 1968) is an English composer of classical and electronic music and an academic. His music has won several prestigious prizes and been performed widely at international music festivals.

== Biography ==
Hayden was born in Portsmouth and grew up in Balham, South London. He played the trumpet, before turning to writing music at the age of nineteen, having found in the activity of composition "the perfect synthesis of the musical, the creative and the intellectual".

He went on to study with Martin Butler, Michael Finnissy and Jonathan Harvey at the University of Sussex, Joseph Dubiel and David Rakowski at Columbia University, and Louis Andriessen at the Royal Conservatory of The Hague. He returned to the University of Sussex to complete his DPhil in 1998.

== Music ==
Hayden's music is written in an atonal, rhythmically complex style, often utilising microtones. He has described his work as "coming from the traditions of 'post-minimalism' and 'new-complexity.'"

Hayden's music is primarily scored for acoustic instruments, but he has also worked extensively with the computer programming environment Max/MSP, notably collaborating with the violinist Mieko Kanno on music for e-violin and computer. He has also used the OpenMusic software (designed at IRCAM) to create computer-generated music.

Together with fellow composers Paul Whitty and Paul Newland he founded the amplified new music ensemble [rout] in 1995, who went on to appear at the Huddersfield Contemporary Music Festival, the ICA, Modern Art Oxford and the Brighton Festival. Their performances have been broadcast on BBC Radio 3 and ResonanceFM.

Hayden's works include Collateral Damage (1999), which was performed in 2003 by Ensemble InterContemporain in the Centre Georges Pompidou, Substratum (2006, revised 2008), a BBC Proms commission for the BBC Symphony Orchestra, and misguided (2011) for the ELISION Ensemble. His most recent work is a string quartet, Transience (2013–14), commissioned by BBC Radio 3 and Quatuor Diotima for performance at the Spitalfields Winter Festival, 2014.

Recordings of his music have been released by labels including NMC and Divine Art. His music has been published by Verlag Neue Musik, Faber Music and Composers Edition.

A complete list of works can be found at Hayden's personal website

== Lecturing and Research ==
Since 1999, Hayden has held lecturing and research posts at the universities of Leeds, London, Durham and Sussex. In 2013 he was appointed the Reader in Music (Composition) at Trinity Laban Conservatoire of Music and Dance.

Samples of his research include:

- Towards Musical Interaction: Sam Hayden's Compositions for E-Violin and Computer
- Collaboration and the Composer: Case Studies from the End of the 20th Century

== Awards ==
Hayden has been the recipient of many prizes and awards including first prize in the 1995 Benjamin Britten International Competition (mv for orchestra, 1991/92) and the composition prize of the 4th Gaudeamus International Young Composers' Meeting 1998.

He was awarded a summer 2000 residency at the Civitella Ranieri Center in Umbria, and a Fulbright Chester Schirmer Fellowship for Music Composition enabling him to work with Brian Ferneyhough and Chris Chafe at Stanford University in the autumn of 2001. He was also granted a 3-year Fellowship by the Arts and Humanities Research Board.

Sunk Losses for orchestra, composed during a residency at the Akademie Schloss Solitude Stuttgart in 2002, won first prize in the second Christoph Delz Foundation Composers' Competition and received its first performance by the Saarbrücken Radio Symphony Orchestra during the festival Musik im 21. Jahrhundert, in Saarbrücken in May 2003.
