= Paul Whitty =

Composer from Northern Ireland (born 1970)

Paul Whitty (born 1970) is an England-based experimental composer and sound artist born in Northern Ireland.

== Biography ==
Paul Whitty was born in Lisburn, Northern Ireland, in 1970 and is currently professor of composition at Oxford Brookes University. He is a founder and director of the Sonic Art Research Unit (SARU). He studied with Roger Marsh, Magnus Lindberg, Colin Matthews, Vinko Globokar and Michael Finnissy.

His work has been performed by the London Sinfonietta, Ensemble Expose, IXION, Michael Finnissy, [rout], Philip Howard, and Mieko Kanno amongst others, and his music has featured at festivals including Brighton, Ultima in Oslo, the Gaudeamus Music Week in Amsterdam, the Huddersfield Contemporary Music Festival, the 54th Venice Biennale and at State of the Nation in London. He has received awards, including from the Arts Council England, Arts and Humanities Research Council (AHRC), the Britten-Pears Foundation, and the British Council. Pianist Philip Howard titled his first album, Decoding Skin (2003), after one of his compositions.

Whitty is a founder, along with the composers Sam Hayden and Paul Newland, of the ensemble [rout], which has made concert tours in the UK, appearing on BBC Radio 3's contemporary music programme Hear and Now, on a BMIC Cutting Edge concert tour, at the ICA and at the Huddersfield Festival.

He is professor of composition and a director of the Sonic Art Research Unit at Oxford Brookes University and has been a visiting tutor in collaborative practice at Dartington College of Arts and the Laban Centre, London. He is a director of audiograft, Oxford's festival of experimental music and sound art, with Stephen Cornford.

=== Vauxhall Pleasure ===
Vauxhall Pleasure (2004–2009), a collaborative work developed with Anna Best, consisted of a site event at Vauxhall Cross, London; an installation at the Museum of Garden History as part of their Tempered Ground exhibition, and two performances at Tate Britain. Vauxhall Pleasure investigates the sounding archaeology of Vauxhall Cross, former site of the Vauxhall Pleasure Gardens. In November 2009 a concert version of the project took place at the Warehouse, London, as part of the BMIC Cutting Edge Series, in the form of a film, an installation and a live performance.

== Selected works ==
- .stop.direction.pause. (1998) for electric guitar, prepared piano and sampler
- bcnsfld (2000) a collaboration with [rout], dance company prang and Anna Best
- on/off (2000) for electric guitar, double bass and shortwave radio
- input-output (2000) an installation in collaboration with Anna Best, presented at Beaconsfield Artspace, Vauxhall.
- Love (1999–2001) for soprano, electric guitar, double bass, sampler, mini-disc and piano
- erase (2001–2002) for steel-string guitar and alto/baritone saxophone
- take it or leave it (2002) for alto saxophone, violin, vibraphone and piano
- stop me if you think you've heard this one before (2002) for harpsichord
- in the midst of life we are in death etc. (2002) for electric violin, electric guitar, double bass, harpsichord, harmonium and sampler
- erase/rewind (2002–2003) two duos: (i) for steel-string guitar and alto/baritone saxophone; (ii) for cello duo
- Vauxhall Pleasure (2004–2009) site-specific event and installation in collaboration with Anna Best
