= Adam Johnson (British conductor) =

British pianist, composer, and conductor

Adam Johnson is a British classical pianist, composer and conductor. He is currently artistic director and principal conductor of the Northern Lights Symphony Orchestra, which is based at St Saviour's, Pimlico.

== Education ==
Johnson first studied at the Royal Northern College of Music in Manchester, under the tutorage of Martyn Brabbins, and George Hurst. He also studied under Peter Feuchtwanger and later obtained a Master's under the direction of Sir Mark Elder. He studied composition with Anthony Gilbert, Elena Firsova and Simon Holt.

== Career ==
Johnson's concerto debut was playing the Mozart Piano Concerto No. 15 at the Pavlovsk Palace, Saint Petersburg, aged 15, and he later went on to conduct with the Elemental Opera company He has assisted Ari Benjamin Meyers and guest conducted with the LSO. In the UK he has performed with Jonathan Pryce at St Martin in the Fields; and in Turkey, the United States, Spain, Norway, and Brazil.

== Composer ==
Johnson has composed mostly orchestral music (such as Aurora Borealis for large orchestra, 2009), and chamber music. There are four string quartets, including No. 2, Surrender Him the Apocolyptic Chrysalis, premiered at the Montepulciano Festival, Italy in 1999, and No. 4 (2012), in which each of the four movements are dedicated to four artists: Jackson Pollock, George Grosz, Dora Carrington and Tracey Emin.

== Honours ==
Johnson was elected a Freeman of the Worshipful Company of Musicians in 2011, and was made a Fellow of the Royal Society of Musicians.
