= Alexander Abercrombie =

British pianist, composer and mathematician

John Ralph Alexander Giles (Alex) Abercrombie (1949 - 2023) was a British pianist, composer, and mathematician.

== Biography ==
Hailing from London, Abercrombie's parents were Nigel Abercrombie, Professor of French at Magdelen College and later a distinguished writer and civil servant and General Secretary of the Arts Council from 1963–68, and Elisabeth Abercrombie, an operatic soprano. Educated at Worth and the Royal College of Music, he gave his professional debut recital at the Purcell Room in London in 1972.

He studied the piano with Margaret Kitchin and in the early 1970s moved to Paris to study with Yvonne Loriod specialising in the works of her husband Olivier Messiaen and his pupils. He then returned to the UK and became well known as a contemporary music specialist, appearing at most of the major London venues.

Abercrombie premiered various difficult works by Nikos Skalkottas, Michael Finnissy, Brian Ferneyhough, Iannis Xenakis and others including Kaikhosru Shapurji Sorabji, some of whose major works he has also edited for publication.

He taught himself mathematics, published many research articles, gave lectures at leading universities including Imperial College London, and in 1996 was awarded a doctorate by Liverpool University for his work in number theory (which includes pioneering studies on Beatty sequences) and probability.

Abercrombie married Barbara Dix, a British mezzo-soprano, whom he met at Glyndebourne whilst working as a répétiteur. They ran the Independent Academy of Music and Drama, in Southport, for 30 years. A number of their former pupils have gone on to have solo careers including Philip Howard, Andrew Slater and Rosa Mannion.

In 1987, Abercrombie and Dix founded the Mozart Singing Competition (formerly National Mozart Competition, for singers and pianists), whose patron is Dame Kiri Te Kanawa. Previous finalists have included Alfie Boe, David Horne, Freddy Kempf, Franzita Whelan and Andrew Sritheran.

Abercrombie's brother-in-law was the composer John Gardner.

Abercrombie died in Wales on April 26, 2023.
