= Tim Benjamin =

Tim Benjamin may refer to:

- Tim Benjamin (composer) (born 1975), Anglo-French composer
- Tim Benjamin (sprinter) (born 1982), British track and field sprinter
