= The Corley Conspiracy =

2007 opera by Tim Benjamin

The Corley Conspiracy is an opera by Tim Benjamin to a libretto by Sean Starke, who also directed. The work premiered on 19 September 2007 in the Purcell Room at the Southbank Centre in London; the orchestral parts were played by the ensemble Radius. The opera was commissioned by the London Design Festival 2007.

== Roles ==
Roles, premiere cast
Role	Premiere cast: 21 September 2007 Conductor: John Traill
Mike Corley	Paul Tosio
Grace Watson	Angela Myers
Alex Jones	Jonatha Webb
Jill Scott	Hannah Grainger-Clemson
James Lewis	Alan Bailey
Voice of the Computer	Elise Emmanuelle
Email Protected	Arne Muus
Orchestra	Alexander Sitkovetsky (violin); Oliver Coates (cello); Jennifer George (flute); Charys Green (clarinet); Huw Morgan (trumpet); Tyler Vahldick (trombone); Jocelyn Lightfoot (horn); John Reid (piano); Adrian Spillett (percussion)
Director	Sean Starke
Stage manager	Arne Muus

The performance of the work lasts for about 75 minutes.

== Structure ==
I	Have The British Gone Mad?	Prologue	
II	BBC's Hidden Shame	Concerto	Prelude (Adagio); Allegretto; Reprise (Adagio)
III	Email Protected	Concerto	Recitative
IV	Paranoia	Concerto	Finale
V	Sulpiride 200mgs	Variations	No. 1 Passacaglia; No. 2 Chaconne
VI	Censorship	Variations	no. 3 on an Interval; No. 4 on a Chord; No. 5 on a note
VII	The Continuing Silence	Epilogue	

Unusually for an opera, all the vocal parts are spoken, but unlike a play, the music is continuous and relates strongly to the text.

== Background ==
Based on a true story that unfolded on Usenet bulletin boards, this new opera is a gripping portrayal of a paranoid mind that raises unsettling questions about a society under surveillance.

— from the programme notes

The text of the work is based on Usenet personality Mike Corley's experiences and theories, as shown in his Usenet posts and on his website.

Mike Corley is an information technology specialist residing in the United Kingdom. He has a long history of posting Usenet messages detailing how MI5 has allegedly bugged his home, watched him via his television and is sending people to follow him around and harass him. These messages are often crossposted to many different newsgroups. His claims of being persecuted by MI5 (the Subject: line of his posts) have led to claims that he is suffering from paranoid schizophrenia. He has claimed in his posts that television personalities are often talking about him in code and are part of the MI5 conspiracy. He has been banned from posting through Google for his abuse of Usenet and has been similarly barred from most Internet service providers in England, an assertion which Corley contested in August 2012.
