= Ian Vine =

British composer (born 1974)

Ian Vine (born 3 January 1974 in Portsmouth, England) is a British composer. Vine grew up in Libya and Hong Kong. He studied composition at the Royal Northern College of Music with Anthony Gilbert and privately with Simon Holt.

There are traces Near and Far Eastern modalities as well as gestural and formal elements in his music. SIRI (1997), for solo percussion with electronics, uses a rhythmic and structural language found in the highly ritualised percussion music of Japan and Korea.

writing on water (1999-), commissioned by Matthew Herbert and released on the Accidental label, is an expanding collection of short (sometimes only 20 seconds long) works using recorded acoustic instruments; and shadow grounds (1999), commissioned by the Huddersfield Contemporary Music Festival for the ensemble recherche as part of their In Nomine Broken Consort Book, a three-minute non-miniature of suspended sound.

His three black moons (1999), commissioned by the London Sinfonietta, was described by The Guardian, '...the most striking piece takes its title from an Alexander Calder mobile - its magical floating sonorities had a Feldmanesque beauty.'

The Guardian has written of him that "Vine's music, clearly influenced by Morton Feldman, is beautifully imagined and precisely focused".

Vine is the artistic director of new music ensemble Radius.

== Key works ==
- white river sand (2002) - large ensemble
- espinas (1999) - large ensemble
- siri (1997) and siri2 (2000) - for solo percussion and percussion quartet respectively

== Recordings ==
- forty works for Richard, self-released, not on label (2011)
- held/always/immer/gehalten, self-released, not on label (2012)
- frieze/static form/division, self-released, not on label (2014)
- forty objects/forty-five objects, self-released, not on label (2015)
- interstices, self-released, not on label (2015)
- copies I-V, self-released, not on label (2016)

=== works appear on ===
- writing on water (2000), on You Are Here, Accidental Records (2003)
- shadow grounds (1999), The Witten In Nomine Broken Consort Book, ensemble recherche, Kairos (2004)
- ocre oscuro (2007), on Jerwood Series 5, London Sinfonietta Label (2009)
