= Síppal, dobbal, nádihegedűvel =

Song cycle by György Ligeti

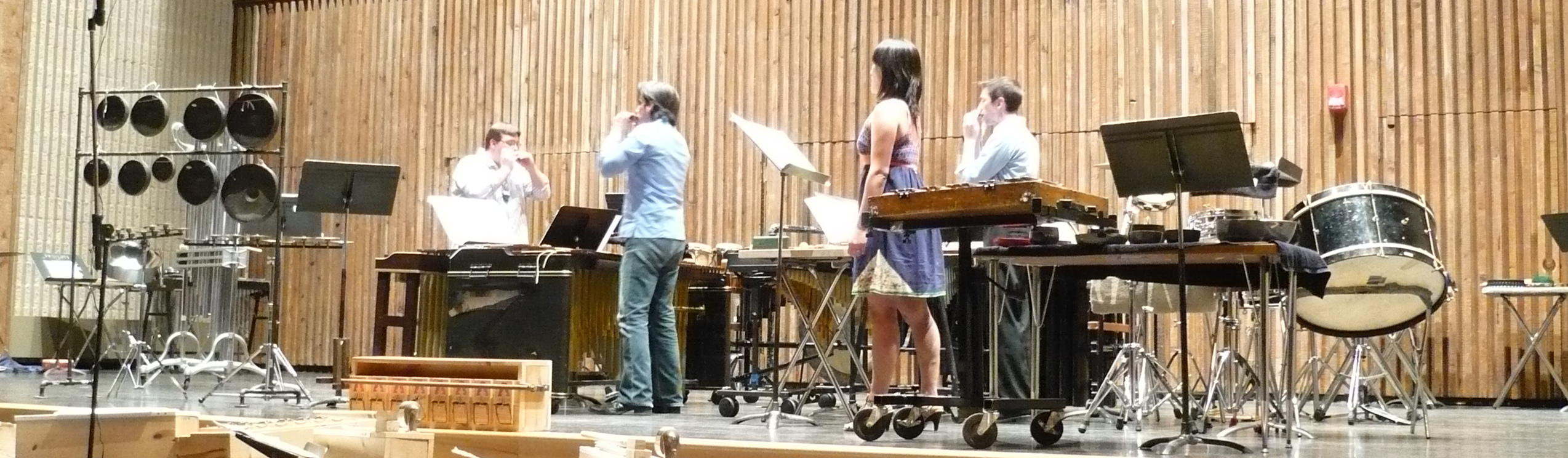
A performance of Síppal, dobbal, nádihegedűvel

Síppal, dobbal, nádihegedűvel (With Pipes, Drums, Fiddles) (2000) is a song cycle in seven movements by the composer György Ligeti based on poetry by Sándor Weöres. The work is scored for mezzo-soprano and an unusual ensemble of percussion and wind instruments (including, in some songs, slide whistles and harmonicas). The lyrics are whimsical and often nonsensical, sometimes combining random Hungarian words or parts of words into a nonsense language.

One of Ligeti's last works, it represents a synthesis of folk and avant-garde elements typical of his later compositions. Ligeti wrote the piece for Amadinda Percussion Group and Katalin Károlyi (mezzo-soprano) and was premiered in 2000 in the Arsenal of Metz.

== Movements ==
The work is for mezzo-soprano accompanied by four percussionists. The percussion for the seven movements is as follows:

1. Fabula

1. 1st marimba, 1st slide whistle, 1st siren whistle, side drum, descant recorder
2. 2nd marimba, 2nd slide whistle, 2nd siren whistle, small side drum, treble recorder
3. Bass marimba, 1st flexatone, 1st marimba, Burmese gong in F♯, tenor recorder
4. Medium and low bass drums, 2nd flexatone, lion's roar, 2nd marimba, tam-tam, cymbal with the sound of a broken pot

2. Táncdal

1. 2 police whistles, log drum, tom-tom, small pair of cymbals (with coughing sound), ratchet, castanets, wood drum (with muffled sound), güiro, railway whistle, vibraslap, slide whistle, sandpaper blocks, 2 cowbells, tambourine, siren whistle, 2 rototoms, tuned bongo or conga, low slit drum, 4 temple blocks (tuned), low cymbal (bowed)
2. 1st marimba, sopranino ocarina in F
3. 2nd marimba, 1st soprano ocarina in C
4. Bass marimba, 2nd soprano ocarina in C

3. Kínai templom

1. Rin, glockenspiel
2. Burmese gongs, crotales
3. Tubular bells
4. Vibraphone

4. Kuli

1. Xylophone
2. 1st marimba
3. 2nd marimba
4. Bass marimba

5. Alma álma

1. 1st chromonica in C
2. 2nd chromonica in B♭
3. 3rd chromonica in C
4. 4th chromonica in B♭

6. Keserédes (67. Magyar Etüd)

1. Claves, sopranino ocarina in F
2. 3 different snare drums and tom-tom, 1st soprano ocarina in C
3. Vibraphone
4. Bass marimba, 2nd soprano ocarina in C

7. Szajkó

1. Maraca, bass drum, tambourine, Japanese wood rattle, castanets, wood block, sistrum, chimes (unpitched), metal bar, güiro, small Japanese bell, tom-tom, 2 police whistles, railway whistle, triangle, 4 temple blocks, 2 different side drums, small suspended cymbal, lion's roar, big whip
2. 4 bongos (tuned ad lib)
3. Xylophone
4. Marimba
