= Für Alina =

1976 musical composition by Arvo Pärt

- Piano music by Arvo Pärt
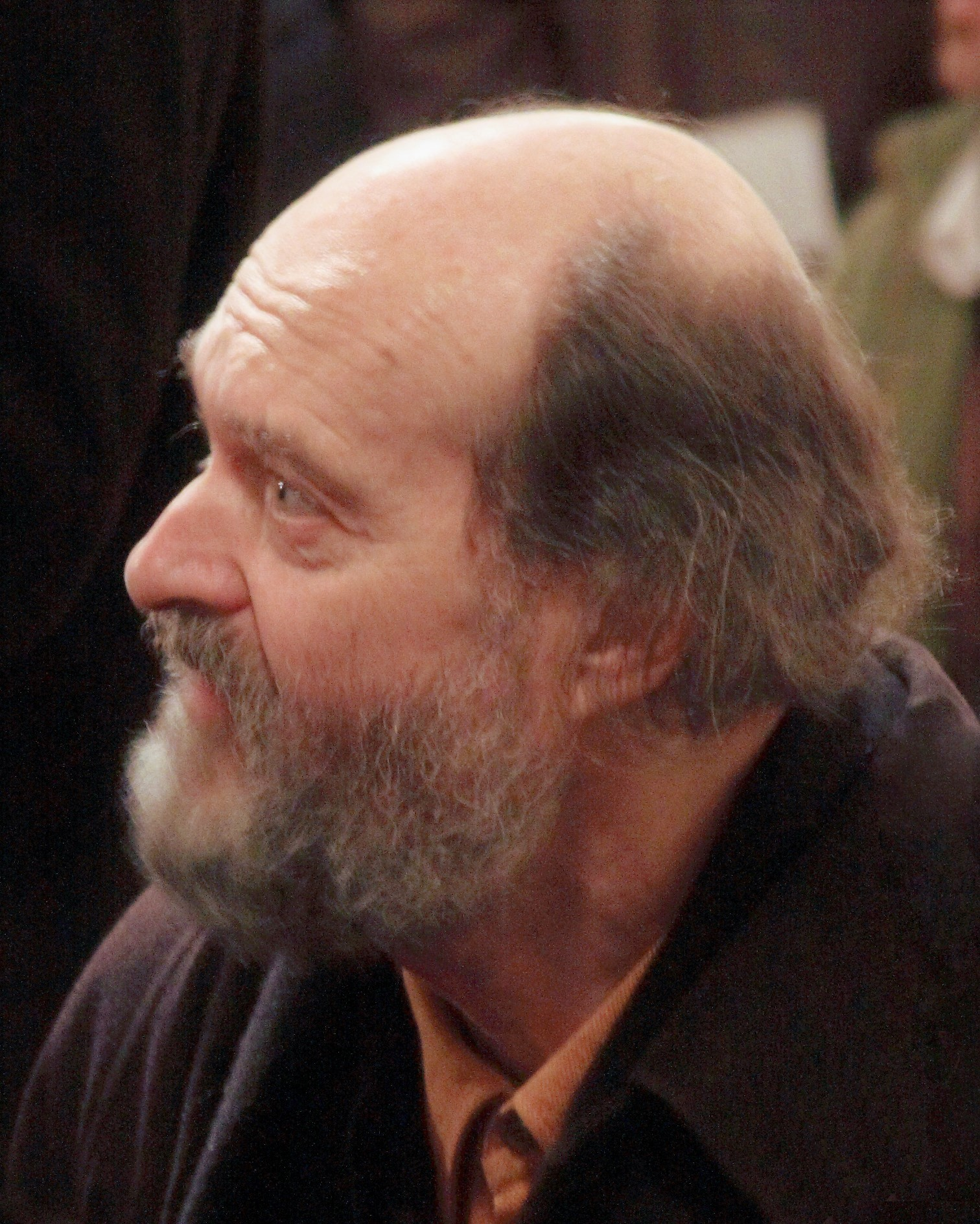
- The composer in 2008
- Key: B minor
- Composed: 1976
- Dedication: Alina, a friend's daughter
- Performed: 1976

Für Alina, (English: For Alina) is a work for piano, composed by the Estonian composer Arvo Pärt. It is considered an essential work of his tintinnabuli style.

== History of composition ==
Für Alina was first performed in Tallinn in 1976, along with six other works, after a long preparatory period in Pärt's life as a composer. This concert was the first to introduce his new signature style of composition, referred to as the tintinnabuli style.

The title echoes Beethoven's piece for solo piano Für Elise. While the identity of the dedicatee of Beethoven's work is unclear, Für Alina was dedicated to a family friend's eighteen-year-old daughter. The family had broken up and the daughter went to England with her father. The work, dedicated to the daughter, was actually meant as a work of consolation for the girl's mother, missing her child. Its introspection calls to mind a vivid image of youth, off to explore the world.

== Musical structure ==
The score of Für Alina is two pages long. It is in the key of B minor and is played at a piano (p) dynamic throughout. Both the left and right hands are written in treble clef with only occasional bass octaves written in bass clef. Although the score appears simple, it leaves much of the interpretation to the performer. In performance, the piece is commonly repeated several times.

The piece does not have a time signature and is marked Ruhig, erhaben, in sich hineinhorchend, which roughly translates as peacefully, in an elevated and introspective manner.Only two note values appear in the score: whole notes and stemless filled-in noteheads (freer as to their duration). This lack of specified durations creates a free and aleatoric effect. The physicist Carlo Rovelli in speaking of his interest in the piece, describes the experience of listening as time appearing to have stopped. There are 15 measures of written music, beginning with an octave in the bass register. The next seven measures increase in length regularly: the second measure has one stemless notehead and one whole note, the next measure has two noteheads and a whole note, and so on until a measure that has seven noteheads and a whole note. In other words, the first measure has one note in each hand, the second has two, the third has three, and so on. This pattern is then repeated in retrograde, returning to one notehead and a whole note and ending with two noteheads and a whole note in the last measure.

It begins with a low double-octave B, which echoes throughout the whole work until the last section. The sustain pedal is depressed throughout the entire piece, with a brief shift prior to the last four measures. The right-hand melody is transposed an octave higher than notated. As there is no time signature, the tempo is free and aleatoric. Although both hands play their single notes at the same time, the use of rubato is encouraged.

The entire harmonic structure, with one exception, is constructed so that the left-hand part outlines a B-minor triad directly below the right-hand melody. Thus, when the melody is on a C♯ or D, the left hand is on a B. When the melody is on an E or F♯, the left hand is on a D, and when the melody is on a G, A, or B, the left hand is on an F♯. The only break from this harmonic structure appears when the left hand plays a C♯ below an F♯ in the right hand, synchronous with the release of the pedal at the end of measure 11.

== Recordings ==
A release endorsed by Pärt himself is the ECM New Series album entitled Alina, recorded in July 1995 and released in 1999. It includes two variations of Für Alina by pianist Alexander Malter. According to the liner notes, the two versions, somewhat like “mood improvisations,” were handpicked by Pärt from a recording that was originally hours long. The two versions most strikingly differ in the use of rubato and that of the use of the low octave b. Both versions clock slightly under eleven minutes.

There are also versions by Pat Metheny (On his 42 string guitar), David Arden, Jeroen van Veen, and Olga Jegunova.

== Use in soundtracks ==
The piece has been used in several soundtracks, including in the films Foxcatcher (2014), Abandon (2002), and Mostly Martha (2001), where it is performed by Alexander Malter.

== Charts ==
Chart (2026)	Peak position
Swedish Jazz Albums (Sverigetopplistan)	7

== Sources ==
- This article draws some facts from the liner notes of the ECM album Alina, an essay White Light written by Hermann Conen and translated into English by Eileen Walliser-Schwarzbart.
