= Joep Franssens =

Dutch composer (born 1955)

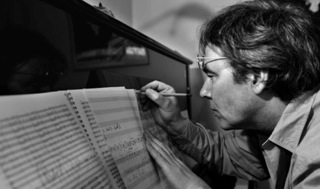
Joep Franssens

Joep Franssens (born 13 January 1955) is a Dutch composer.

== Work ==
Joep Franssens studied piano in Groningen and composition in the Hague and Rotterdam with composer Louis Andriessen and Klaas de Vries respectively. Franssens is a representative of the post-serial generation of Dutch composers who use tonal means and an accessible idiom without neo-Romantic features, even if the pathos-laden, highly emotional nature of his music appears to contradict this endeavour. In his works, which consist of chamber music, choral and orchestral works, Franssens aims at a synthesis of monumentality and euphony and is initially guided by J.S. Bach and the work of György Ligeti such as Lontano and Atmosphères. Later a trend towards radical austerity become apparent under the influence of American minimalist music, East European mysticism (e.g. Pärt) and the symphonic pop music of the 1970s such as Yes and Genesis, culminating in the static diatonicism of the ensemble work ‘Dwaallicht’ (1989) and the serene counterpoint of ‘Sanctus’ for orchestra (1996, rev. 1999). The instrumentation increasingly shows a preference for warm, luxuriant colours.

Although Franssens' multifaceted musical style does not make it easy to classify him, he is often regarded as a representative of the so-called New Spirituality in the Netherlands. NTR (Dutch public Television) made the documentary 'The Third Ear' on this international movement, with composers such as Arvo Pärt and Giya Kancheli. In his music Franssens aims to express the Universal; his sources of inspiration are to be found amongst writers and philosophers like Fernando Pessoa and Baruch de Spinoza. In a rich tonal language his music evokes strong emotions by the public, both unacquainted with contemporary classical music as well as experienced listeners.

Franssens' choral work Harmony of the Spheres has been performed globally. He worked with choirs such as the Swedish Radio Choir, BBC Singers, Latvian National State Choir, Finnish Radio Chamber Choir and Netherlands Chamber Choir. The latter took Franssens’ music on tour through Europe and the US in 2000 and 2001, led by the Estonian conductor Tõnu Kaljuste. Multi-laureate pianist Ralph van Raat has his music on his repertoire since 2000. His orchestral music is performed by many Dutch orchestras.

Well-known conductors like Yakov Kreizberg, Tõnu Kaljuste, Lucas Foss, Gerd Albrecht, Vasily Petrenko, and Daniel Raiskin performed his works with the Netherlands Philharmonic Orchestra, the Rotterdam Philharmonic Orchestra, The Hague Philharmonic Orchestra, Lodz Philharmonic Orchestra, Latvian National State Orchestra, Netherlands Radio Philharmonic Orchestra and Tallinn Chamber Orchestra.

Franssens received commissions from, amongst others, Rotterdam Art Foundation, Eduard van Beinum Foundation, De Doelen, NTR ZaterdagMatinee, Fund for the Creation of the Arts, SNS Reaal Fund and Netherlands Symphony Orchestra. The latter performed the world premiere of Bridge of Dawn (Second Movement) in Spring 2013.

On the occasion of the 70th birthday of Arvo Pärt in November 2015, the first performance of his Piano Concerto took place with soloist Ralph Van Raat accompanied by the Noord Nederlands Orkest conducted by Tõnu Kaljuste. Just prior to the premiere, Franssens was awarded ‘Het Gouden Viooltje’ (The Golden Violin). An award earmarked for outstanding musical talent, born in the northern Dutch provinces, with an international career.

== Compositions ==
- Between the Beats (1979) for two pianos
- August Moon (1979) for piano
- Turn (1980) for 2 oboes and cello
- Solo for Flute (1980)
- Ellipsis (1983) for harpsichord
- Echo's (1983) for 4 flutes, 3 oboes, 3 trumpets, vibraphone, marimba and strings (7.7.7.4.2)
- Consort Music (1984) for 2 flutes, oboe (English horn), bass clarinet, French horn, bassoon, violin, viola, cello, double bass and piano
- Phasing (1985) for women's choir and orchestra: text (Portuguese) by Fernando Pessoa
- Low Budget Music (1986) for flute, oboe (English horn), clarinet (bass clarinet), French horn, bassoon, piano, violin, viola, cello and double bass
- Old Songs, New Songs (1988) for 2 pianos
- Dwaallicht (1989) for 2 sopranos and ensemble: text (Latin) by Spinoza
- Floating (1989) for 2 vibraphones and 3 marimbas
- Taking the Waters (1990) for solo soprano and orchestra
- The straight Line (1991) for saxophone quartet
- Primary Colours (1992) for saxophone orchestra
- The Gift of Song (1994) for 2 pianos
- New Departure (1995) for cello and piano
- After the Queen's Speech (1995) for brass ensemble
- Sanctus (1996) for orchestra
- Winter Child (1996) for piano
- Sarum Chant (1997) for vocal quartet and gamelan
- Roaring Rotterdam (1997) for orchestra
- Entrata (1997) for cello and 2 pianos
- Magnificat (1999) for soprano, choir and orchestra: text (Portuguese) by Fernando Pessoa
- Harmony of the Spheres (1994-2001); cycle in five movements for mixed chorus and string orchestra
- Intimation of Spring (2001-2004) for piano
- Tales of Wonder (2003); seven pieces for piano (2-4 hands)
- Bridge of Dawn, movement 1 (2004-2006) for orchestra
- Harmony of the Spheres, movement 5 (2005); version for flute orchestra
- Song of Release (2005) for piano
- Blue Encounter (2006) for viola
- Grace (2008) for orchestra
- Bridge of Dawn, movement 2 (2005-2011) for soprano, mixed choir and orchestra
- Harmony of the Spheres, first movement (2012) version for string orchestra
- Harmony of the Spheres, fifth movement (2013) version for string orchestra
- Symmetry (2014), a dance-opera film
- Piano Concerto (2015)
- Piano Concerto (2016) version for chamber orchestra
- Taking the Waters (2016) version for 4 pianos
- Entrata (2016) version for 4 pianos

== Publisher ==
Franssens' music was published by Donemus in Amsterdam. Since 2008 his music is published by Deuss Music (managed by Albersen Verhuur) in The Hague.

== Compact discs ==
- Echo's, Phasing, Sanctus. Performed by the Netherlands Ballet Orchestra, conductor Thierry Fischer. Label: Composers’ Voice (CV 65)
- Dwaallicht, Taking the Waters and Winter Child. Performed by Gerrie de Vries, Reina Boelens, Delta Ensemble, Netherlands Radio Philhar- monic Orch. Lukas Foss, Ivo Janssen. Label: Composers’ Voice (CV 84)
- Harmony of the Spheres, complete cycle Performed by The Chamber Choir of the Netherlands with Tallinn Chamber Orchestra conducted by Tõnu Kaljuste. Label: Composers Voice (CV 133)
- Harmony of the Spheres, complete cycle version 2010. Performed by VU Chamber Choir and Ensemble Waterloo, conductor Boudewijn Jansen, published bij Franssens 2011,
- The Straight Line. Performed by the Amstel Saxophone Quartet. Label: Erasmus Music & Media WVH 269
- Roaring Rotterdam, Harmony of the Spheres (first movement) and Magnificat. Performed by the Netherlands Radio Philharmonic Orchestra, Netherlands Radio Choir and Netherlands Chamber Choir. Label: Etcetera (ktc 1321)
- Entrata, Old Songs New Songs, Between The Beats. Minimal Piano Collection, Vol. XI-XX Performed by pianist Jeroen van Veen and others. Label: Brilliant Classics (9171)
- Piano Works: The Gift of Song, Winter Child. Ralph van Raat (piano) Label: nl:Etcetera Records, KTC 1533
