= Ingpen & Williams =

British classical music talent management agency

Ingpen & Williams International Artists' Management, founded in London in 1946, was a British classical music talent management agency. It was named for founders Joan Ingpen and her dog Williams, a dachshund.

Ingpen, conductor Georg Solti's agent during the 1950s, became artistic administrator of the Royal Opera House in Covent Garden in 1961 at Solti's request, after which Ingpen & Williams was managed by Howard Hartog, editor of European Music in the Twentieth Century with help from his wife, the concert pianist Margaret Kitchin.

It was Joan Ingpen who put lyric tenor Luciano Pavarotti on the international opera map in 1963. She hired him to cover for the role of Rodolfo in La bohème in the event that Giuseppe Di Stefano was unable to perform. Di Stefano withdrew on the second night, and Pavarotti's more than twenty five performances drew great acclaim.

The artists represented by Ingpen & Williams include, among many others, Richard Armstrong, Pierre Boulez, Alfred Brendel, Julian BreamJoan Sutherland, Janina Fialkowska, the Guarneri Quartet, Barbara Hendricks, Heinz Holliger, Ralph Kirshbaum, Paul Lewis, Peter Serkin, Graham Vick, Roger Vignoles, Radovan Vlatkovic, the Chicago Symphony Orchestra and West-Eastern Divan.

Joan Ingpen died December 29, 2007, aged 91.

In September 2016 Ingpen and Williams Limited changed its company name to Groves Artists Limited, and continues to manage artists such as Sir Mark Elder, Sir Richard Armstrong and Graham Vick.
