= John Kenny (trombonist) =

British trombonist, actor and composer (born 1957)

- Born: 1957 (age 67–68); Birmingham, England
- Genres: Jazz, classical
- Instruments: Trombone, carnyx

John Kenny (born 1957) is a British trombonist, carnyxplayer and composer.

== Career ==
Kenny is a professor at the Guildhall School of Music and Drama and at the Royal Conservatoire of Scotland. He received the Gaudeamus International Interpreters Award in 1983 and the International Trombone Association Lifetime Achievement Award in 2017.

Kenny was part of the team which created the modern reconstruction of the Carnyx horn and has subsequently performed and recorded on the instrument.
