= Sebastian Shaw (actor) =

English actor, director and writer (1905–1994)

- Shaw in a 1979 episode of Rumpole of the Bailey
- Born: 29 May 1905; Holt, Norfolk, England
- Died: 23 December 1994 (aged 89); Brighton, Sussex, England
- Education: Slade School of Fine Art; Royal Academy of Dramatic Art
- Occupations: Actor; theatre director; novelist; playwright; poet
- Years active: 1914–1991
- Spouse: Margaret Kate Wellesley-Lynn (m. 1929; died 1956)
- Children: 1
- Father: Geoffrey Turton Shaw
- Relatives: Martin Shaw (uncle); Mont Campbell (nephew)

Sebastian Lewis Shaw (29 May 1905 – 23 December 1994) was an English actor, theatre director, novelist, playwright and poet. During his seven-decade career, he appeared in dozens of stage performances and more than 40 film and television productions.

Shaw was born in Holt, Norfolk, and made his acting debut at age eight at a London theatre. He studied acting at Gresham's School and the Royal Academy of Dramatic Art. Although he worked primarily on the London stage, he made his Broadway debut in 1929, when he played one of the two murderers in Rope's End. He appeared in his first film, Caste, in 1930 and quickly began to create a name for himself in films. He described himself as a "rotten actor" as a youth and said his success was primarily due to his good looks. He claimed to mature as a performer only after returning from service in the Royal Air Force during the Second World War.

Shaw was particularly known for his performances in productions of Shakespeare plays which were considered daring and ahead of their time. In 1966 he joined the Royal Shakespeare Company, where he remained for a decade and delivered some of his most acclaimed performances. He also wrote several poems, as well as a novel, The Christening, which was published in 1975. In 1983 he appeared in the third instalment of the original Star Wars Trilogy, Return of the Jedi, as the redeemed Anakin Skywalker, as well as Skywalker's ghost in the original 1983 theatrical release of the film.

== Early life ==
Sebastian Lewis Shaw was born in Holt, Norfolk, on 29 May 1905, as one of three children born to Geoffrey Shaw, the music master at Gresham's School, a Norfolk independent boarding school, where Shaw began his education. His uncle, Martin Shaw, was a composer of church music, and his family's love of music heavily influenced Shaw's career path.

== Career ==
=== Early career ===
Shaw made his acting debut at age eight on the London stage as one of the juvenile band in The Cockyolly Bird at the Royal Court Theatre in Chelsea on 1 January 1914. During his time at Gresham's, he also played Petruchio in The Taming of the Shrew, his first of many performances from the works of William Shakespeare; his schoolmate W. H. Auden, who would go on to become a highly regarded poet, portrayed Katherina in the play opposite him. After Gresham's, Shaw planned to become a painter and spent two years at the Slade School of Fine Art before switching his interests to acting; regarding the change, his father informed him, "I wondered when you would come to your senses." He earned a scholarship to the Royal Academy of Dramatic Art in Bloomsbury, London. The actor Charles Laughton enrolled in the academy at the same time as Shaw, who later said his first impression of Laughton was "a poor fat boy". Although Shaw and his fellow students initially felt pity for Laughton, they were quickly impressed with his talent.

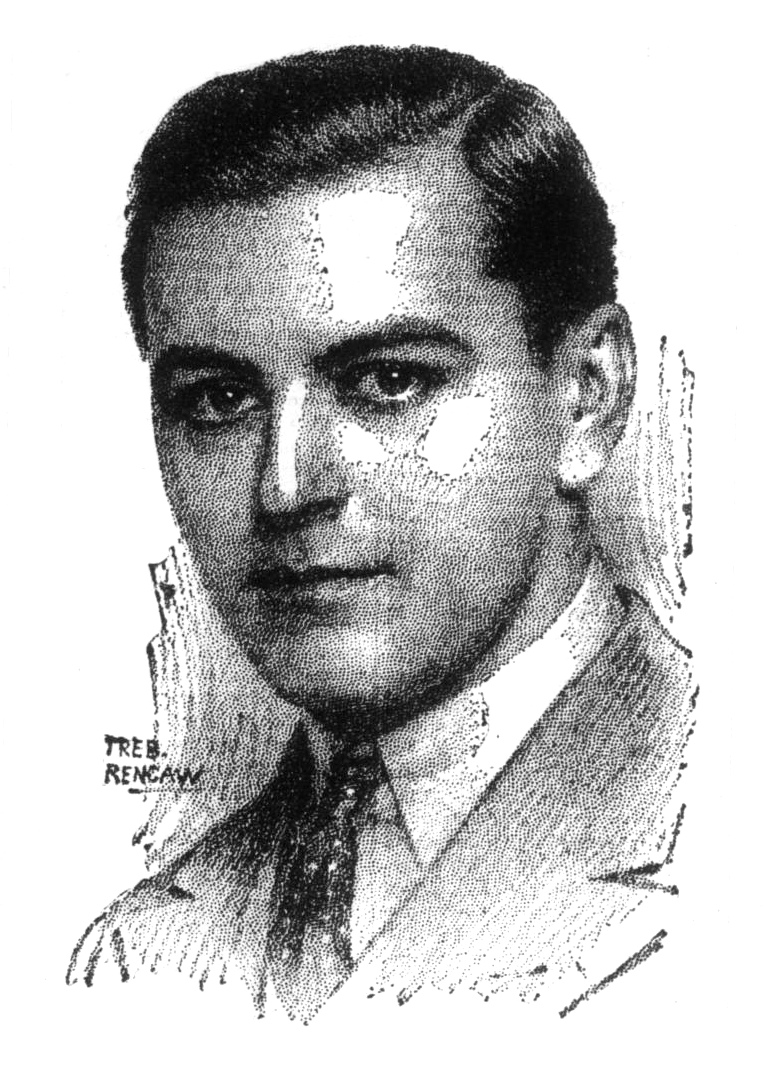
Shaw during his New York performance of Rope's End

Shaw appeared in regional theatres in Bristol, Liverpool and Hull. In 1925 he performed in London as the Archangel in The Sign of the Sun, and played first Lewis Dodd and then the Major in separate productions of The Constant Nymph. He received instruction in verse speaking under the theatre director William Bridges-Adams in the Stratford Festival Company at Stratford-upon-Avon, where he played some of his early Shakespeare roles, including Romeo in Romeo and Juliet, Ferdinand in The Tempest and Prince Hal in Henry IV in 1926. He was criticised for the audacity he displayed in the latter role. When Prince Hal takes on his kingship and rejects the self-indulgent character Falstaff, convention of the day called for Prince Hal to change from a jovial drinking partner to an arrogant snob, but Shaw saw the view as simple-minded and contradictory toward Shakespeare's script. Instead, he displayed inward regrets about leaving Falstaff and accepting the new responsibilities. The interpretation was criticised at the time but, years later, became the standard approach to the character.

Shaw made his Broadway debut in 1929, when he played the murderer Wyndham Brandon in Patrick Hamilton's stage thriller, Rope's End. In 1929 he married Margaret Delamere and lived with her in Albany, an apartment complex off Piccadilly in Westminster. The two would eventually have a daughter together named Drusilla (born 1932). He returned to the works of William Shakespeare in 1931, playing Claudio in Measure for Measure at London's Fortune Playhouse. In 1932 he once again played Romeo at the Embassy Theatre. Other works around this period included productions of Ivor Novello's Sunshine Sisters in 1933, Double Door alongside Sybil Thorndike in 1934, J. M. Barrie's A Kiss for Cinderella in 1937, and Robert Morley's Goodness, How Sad in 1938.

The first film Shaw appeared in was Caste in 1930. He soon began to make a name for himself in films such as Brewster's Millions in 1935, Men Are Not Gods in 1936 and Farewell Again in 1937. He was making about £300 a week during this stage of his career, a significant sum, higher than the salary of the British prime minister of the time. He brought what the Daily Telegraph described as a "smooth villainy" to the role of Frank Sutton in The Squeaker in 1937, while in 1939 he played the hero Cdr. David Blacklock alongside Conrad Veidt and Valerie Hobson in The Spy in Black, Michael Powell and Emeric Pressburger's first collaboration. Shaw described himself as a film buff and called the Academy Award-winning actor Spencer Tracy his "great god of all screen actors"; he was so impressed by Tracy's technique that he claimed to become depressed while watching his films because Tracy made acting look simple, while Shaw claimed to find it so difficult to master himself.

=== Second World War and post-war career ===
When the Second World War broke out, Shaw took a break from acting and joined the Royal Air Force. On 25 April 1941 he was commissioned as an acting-pilot officer on probation in the Administrative and Special Duties Branch and over the next three months was speedily promoted to pilot officer on probation, flying officer and flight lieutenant. According to his obituary in the Guardian, Shaw saw little action in the service and was told the only chance he would have to fly would be as a rear gunner. Some of his fellow airmen hounded Shaw for autographs, while others mocked his posh accent, to which he retaliated with an excellent and unflattering imitation of their less refined speech. He continued to hold a Royal Air Force Volunteer Reserve commission after the war until he resigned his commission on 10 February 1954; he was permitted to retain his rank.

Immediately upon returning to London after the war, Shaw lost his Albany flat and his acting contract, and essentially had to restart his acting career. Although he had made twenty films before the war and had already begun to develop a reputation as a strong leading man, in later years he would describe himself as "a rotten actor" in the 1930s who landed roles based mainly on his good looks. He used the phrase "a piece of cinema beefcake" to describe himself as an actor during that period. He felt that after his return home from military service, he learned to act properly and began to mature as a performer. Shaw's Royal Air Force experience was put to good use when he played a pilot in Journey Together, the 1946 RAF training film in which the actor Edward G. Robinson coached the actor Richard Attenborough in the rudiments of flying.

In 1945 Shaw returned to the Embassy Theatre to direct Fyodor Dostoevsky's The Gambler. Significant theatre roles that decade included Hercules in The Thracian Horses at the Lyric Theatre, Hammersmith in 1946, Mr. Hern-Lawrence in Florida Scott-Maxwell's experimental I Said to Myself at the Mercury Theatre, Notting Hill Gate in 1947, Sir James Kirkham in His Excellency at Prince's Theatre in 1950, and Filmer Jesson, MP, in Arthur Wing Pinero's His House in Order at New Theatre in 1951. In 1956, he played the title role in the first British production of Hugo von Hofmannsthal's Everyman. That same year, he wrote the lyrics to his father's ballad-opera, All at Sea, which played at the Royal College of Music. In 1957 he played Lucifer in Brother Lucifer in Shrewsbury, Shropshire, and a sinister Venetian agent in Jonathan Griffin's The Hidden King in Edinburgh.

As Shaw grew older, his reputation as a dramatic actor grew stronger, and he became known for a sharp intelligence and dignified style. Although his good looks diminished, reviewers felt that he used his florid and weatherbeaten face well in evoking grandeur and self-assuredness in such roles as generals, priests and his familiar Shakespearean parts. In 1956, his wife Margaret Delamere died; she was survived by their daughter Drusilla. Shaw began a romantic relationship in the mid-1950s with Joan Ingpen, the well-known classical music and opera talent agent who had previously represented him. The two were romantically involved, to the point that she took his surname, until Shaw's death. During the 1980s, however, Shaw also started a relationship with Harriet Ravenscroft, the mother of the disc jockey John Peel, whom he met while performing at Ludlow Castle at Ludlow. He split his time between Ingpen and Ravenscroft on a four-day rotating basis to which both women consented. Although Peel got along with Shaw and said he made his mother happy, he said he did not feel comfortable with the arrangement. He felt it disrupted his mother's friendships and prospects for a more stable relationship.

In 1965 the British theatre director William Gaskill was named artistic director of the Royal Court Theatre, where he hoped to re-establish a repertoire. He approached Shaw, who had made his acting début at the Royal Court Theatre as a youth, and Shaw agreed to return. There he delivered several performances over the next year, including General Conrad von Hotzendorf in John Osborne's A Patriot for Me; various roles in Ann Jellicoe's Shelley; Sir Francis Harker in N. F. Simpson's The Cresta Run and Pte Atterclife in John Arden's Serjeant Musgrave's Dance.

=== Royal Shakespeare Company ===
In 1966 Shaw joined the Royal Shakespeare Company, where he spent the next decade of his career and eventually became an associate artist. He mostly appeared in Shakespeare plays, including the title role in Cymbeline, the Duke of York in Richard II, the King in All's Well That Ends Well, Ulysses in Troilus and Cressida, and Leonato in Much Ado About Nothing. The Times described his performance in the title role of Cymbeline as "awe-inspiring", and The Independent described his performance as Polonius in Hamlet as "unrivalled in his complacency and sense of circumstance". The Telegraph described his performance of Gloucester in King Lear as "doleful" and his performance of Duncan in Macbeth as "decent". Many of the company's Shakespearean productions at the time were considered interpretive and modern, which drew criticism from some traditionalists, but Shaw defended the experimental nature of the shows and rejected the notion that plays should be restricted to preconceived interpretations.

During his time with the company, he also demonstrated what the Daily Telegraph called a "crusty charm" as Sir Oblong Fitz Oblong in Robert Bolt's children's play The Thwarting of Baron Bolligrew. He was also noted as possessing a gift for dry comedy during this period of his acting career, exemplified by his roles in Maxim Gorky's plays Enemies and Summerfolk. He demonstrated a particular knack for Russian comedy in Jonathan Miller's productions of the Anton Chekhov plays Three Sisters and Ivanov.

In 1978, Shaw earned acclaim for his performance as a judge in the stage debut of Whose Life Is It Anyway? at the Mermaid Theatre. The production won Laurence Olivier Awards for Best Play and Best Actor (Tom Conti). Although 73 years old, Shaw did not let his age slow down his career. During the run of this production a mugger tried to steal his money, but Shaw chased him down, tackled him and recovered his property. Later that year, he was painted in the nude by his nephew, Brian Ocean. During his later years, Shaw suffered a physical disability that made him tremble, which had a negative impact on his television roles, particularly when handling cups or trays of drinks. One of his later television appearances was in The Old Curiosity Shop, a 1979 mini-series based on the novel by Charles Dickens. Around this time, he also voiced the part of Squire Beltham in a radio production of The Adventures of Harry Richmond, which the Daily Telegraph said was "remembered with affection". He lent his voice to several radio performances, both Shakespearean and modern, including protagonist John Tanner in the five-hour Man and Superman by George Bernard Shaw.

=== Writing career ===
Shaw wrote Take a Life, his first play, in 1961. He directed a production of the show at London's Mermaid Theatre, where he also played the lead role of the Detective. That same year he played two lead roles in Shaw plays at the Dublin Theatre Festival: Mrs. Warren's Profession and Candida. Around this time, he also wrote an outline for a television comedy series about four girls sharing a flat, inspired by his real-life daughter, who was in her early twenties and living in a flat with other girls her age. The series was submitted to the Granada Television company, which expressed interest in the show and said it was one of two under consideration for television. The company ultimately chose the other show, the long-running British soap opera Coronation Street.

Shaw agreed to take certain roles only on the condition that he have complete freedom to rewrite his dialogue. When he appeared in It Happened Here, a 1966 World War II film, he wrote many of his own lines, which the filmmakers later said "gave his dialogue an individual slant which enhanced his performance". He also helped in other aspects of the filmmaking, including casting; he introduced the filmmakers to Fiona Leland, who would be cast as the wife of Shaw's character in It Happened Here. He wrote other plays, including The Ship's Bell, The Cliff Walk, The Glass Maze and Cul de Sac. He also wrote Poems, a collection of his personal poetry, which saw a limited print of 300 copies published by the University of Exeter.

Shaw wrote The Christening, his only novel, in 1975. It centres around Miles Madgwick, who believes that he is bisexual but is too timid to find out through physical intercourse, so he instead describes his most intimate thoughts in his diary. He then meets a married woman named Alice and her son, Rodney; he comes to identify with Rodney's childhood innocence, and in Alice sees a symbol both of his mother and a heterosexual lover. Alice starts to tire of her husband and grow fonder of Madgwick, who experiences mixed emotions in his continued interactions with her and Rodney. One night, Rodney stays overnight at Madgwick's house and, when he takes the boy home in a taxicab, the driver observes their strange behaviour and accuses Madgwick of being a pederast. When Alice asks Madgwick to become the godfather to her new child, the driver threatens to expose Madgwick, creating a conflict between losing his first feelings of intimacy with others or facing humiliation and ridicule at the driver's exposure.

A description in the book cover flap reads, "In this tender, sensitive and blackly comic novel, Sebastian Shaw, the distinguished Shakespearean actor, explores areas of sexual and emotional encounter that are rarely seen and, unfortunately, too rarely understood." Shaw originally planned to call the novel The Godfather, but later said he was glad he did not due to the popularity of Mario Puzo's book of that name. He was said to have been working on another novel shortly after The Christening was completed, but no others were ever published.

Shaw's memoirs were published posthumously in 2016.

=== Return of the Jedi ===
Shaw as the unmasked Anakin Skywalker in the 2004 DVD re-release of Return of the Jedi, in which his eyebrows were digitally removed and eye colour altered to match that of Hayden Christensen.

In 1982 Shaw was chosen for the brief but significant role of the unmasked and dying Anakin Skywalker in Return of the Jedi, the third and final film in the original Star Wars trilogy. As in the previous films, David Prowse and Bob Anderson played the costumed scenes, while James Earl Jones and Ben Burtt provided the voice and breaths, respectively, of Darth Vader. Shaw was cast in a single scene with Mark Hamill, during the moment aboard the second Death Star when Luke Skywalker (Hamill) unmasks his dying father. As the scene was considered the film's emotional climax, the casting crew sought an experienced actor for the role. Contrary to popular belief, Shaw was familiar with the previous two Star Wars films and enjoyed them particularly for the visual effects, which he described in an interview with the science-fiction film magazine Starlog as "brilliant techniques which, in many ways, were revolutionary, something quite new."

When Shaw arrived at the set for filming, he ran into his friend Ian McDiarmid, the actor playing Emperor Palpatine. When McDiarmid asked him what he was doing there, Shaw responded, "I don't know, dear boy, I think it's something to do with science-fiction." His presence during the filming was kept secret from all but the minimum cast and crew, and Shaw was contractually obliged not to discuss any film secrets with anyone, even his family. The unmasking scene, directed by Richard Marquand, was filmed in one day and required only a few takes, with no alteration from the original dialogue.

Although Shaw's unmasking scene lasted only two minutes and seven seconds and included just 24 words of dialogue spoken by Shaw, he received more fan mail and autograph requests from Return of the Jedi than he had for any role in the rest of his career. He later reflected in a 1987 interview that he very much enjoyed his experience filming for Return of the Jedi and was "oddly flattered" that an action figure by Kenner was made of him from the film. Star Wars's creator, George Lucas, personally directed Shaw for his appearance in the final scene of the film, in which he is a Force ghost of Anakin. In a 1995 interview with Leonard Maltin, Lucas stated that the original ending of Return of the Jedi was "pretty much the way it was always thought to come out," reflecting his understanding of Anakin’s story at the time. Shaw’s appearance as Anakin's Force ghost was preserved in the 1997 Special Edition, featuring revised music and additional ending sequences. Leading up to and during the release of the Star Wars film The Phantom Menace in 1999, interviews and reference materials continued to acknowledge Shaw as the canonical portrayal of older Anakin, including retrospective discussions of the character’s and Shaw's legacy.

When the film was re-released on DVD in 2004, a few changes were made. The unmasking scene with Hamill remained mostly the same, but Shaw's eyebrows were digitally removed to maintain continuity with the injuries Darth Vader suffers at the end of Revenge of the Sith. His naturally brown eyes were also recoloured blue to match those of Hayden Christensen, who portrayed Anakin in Attack of the Clones and Revenge of the Sith.

Most notably, Shaw's image as a Force ghost in the final scene was replaced with that of Christensen in the 2004 DVD release. This last attempt to tie the prequel and original trilogies together proved to be among the most controversial changes in the Star Wars re-releases.

=== Later career ===
Shaw remained active in his later years; along with his fellow Royal Shakespeare Company actors Ian Richardson, John Nettles, Martin Best and Ann Firbank, he engaged in discussions and workshops with acting teachers and students in the early 1980s. Although appearances in films became far less common in his later career, he received much acclaim for his performance as the Cold War spy Sharp in Clare Peploe's High Season at the New York Film Festival in 1987; The San Diego Union-Tribune said Shaw played the role with "endearing, sweet gravity". One of his last performances was in the Christmas season of 1988 and 1989, when he played the wizard in a stage production of The Wizard of Oz at the Barbican Centre. The Times said audiences were "delighted to recognise his honeyed threats from behind the great carapace that disguised the Wizard of Oz". Shaw became an honorary life-member at the Garrick Club, which included such past members as the writers Charles Dickens, J.M. Barrie, Kingsley Amis, and A. A. Milne; the artists Dante Gabriel Rossetti and John Everett Millais; and the composer Edward Elgar.

== Death ==
Shaw died of natural causes on 23 December 1994 at the age of 89 in Brighton, England. A memorial service was held on 15 February 1995 at St Paul's, Covent Garden, commonly known as the Actors' Church due to its long association with the theatre community. The actors Ian Richardson and Ben Kingsley read works by William Shakespeare, the stage actress Estelle Kohler read How Do I Love Thee? by the Victorian poet Elizabeth Barrett Browning, the actress Sheila Allen read Life by the poet George Herbert, and the actor Kenneth Branagh read from the works of Henry Scott Holland. One of Shaw's own poems, Gemini, was also read by Alan Ravenscroft. Stephen Varcoe, a baritone, sang Wie bist du meine Königin by Johannes Brahms, accompanied by Graham Johnson on the piano, and guitarist Martin Best performed and sang his composition of Ariel's Songs from The Tempest. Shaw was survived by his partner Joan Ingpen, daughter Drusilla MacLeod, sisters Susan Bonner-Morgan and Penelope Harness, and sister-in-law Olga Young. His other long term companion Harriet Ravenscroft pre-deceased him.

== Filmography ==
Year	Title	Role	Notes
1930	Caste	Hon. George d'Alroy	
1933	Little Miss Nobody	Pat Carey	
1933	House of Dreams	Unknown	
1933	Taxi to Paradise	Tom Fanshawe	
1934	The Way of Youth	Alan Marmon	
1934	The Four Masked Men	Arthur Phillips	
1934	Get Your Man	Robert Halbean	
1934	Adventure Ltd.	Bruce Blandford	
1935	Brewster's Millions	Frank	
1935	The Lad	Jimmy	
1935	The Ace of Spades	Trent	
1935	Three Witnesses	Roger Truscott	
1935	Jubilee Window	Peter Ward	
1935	Department Store	John Goodman Johnson	
1936	Tomorrow We Live	Eric Morton	
1936	Birds of a Feather	Jack Wortle	
1936	Jury's Evidence	Philip	
1936	Men Are Not Gods	Edmund Davey	
1937	Farewell Again	Capt. Gilbert Reed	
1937	The Squeaker	Frank Sutton	
1938	Julius Caesar	Marcus Brutus	
1939	Too Dangerous to Live	Jacques Leclerc	
1939	Prison Without Bars	Doctor	
1939	Table d'Hote	Adam	"Doubting Hall" section
1939	The Spy in Black	Lieutenant Ashington; Commander David Blacklock	
1940	Now You're Talking	Charles Hampton	
1940	Three Silent Men	Sir James Quentin	
1940	Bulldog Sees It Through	Derek Sinclair	
1940	The Flying Squad	Inspector Bradley	
1941	East of Piccadilly	Tamsie Green	
1945	Journey Together	Squadron Leader Marshall	
1947	Hamlet	Claudius	
1949	The Glass Mountain	Bruce McLeod	
1949	Landfall	Wing Commander Dickens	
1952	BBC Sunday Night Theatre	Archdeacon Adam Brandon	Episode: "The Cathedral"
1953	Laxdale Hall	Hugh Marvell, MP	
1958	Armchair Theatre	Unknown	Episode: "The Terrorist"
1960	Here Lies Miss Sabry	James "Cracker" Talbot	
1961	For Elise	Chief Inspector Lynch	BBC Home Service Radio Drama
1966	It Happened Here	Dr. Richard Fletcher	
1966	Out of the Unknown	Major Gregory	Episode: "Walk's End"
1968	All's Well That Ends Well	King of France	
1968	A Midsummer Night's Dream	Quince	
1972	Thirty-Minute Theatre	Judge	Episode: "The Judge's Wife"
1972	Dead of Night	Powys Jubb	Episode: "Death Cancels All Debts"
1975	Village Hall	Ralph	Episode: "Lot 23"
1977	Play for Today	Abbot General	Episode: "A Choice of Evils"
1978	BBC2 Play of the Week	Carl Fiodorich	Episode: "Liza"
1979	Rumpole of the Bailey	Mr. Justice Skelton	Episode: "Rumpole and the Show Folk"
1979	The Old Curiosity Shop	Grandfather	
1981	Nanny	Mr. Starkie	Episode: "Goats and Tigers"
1981	Timon of Athens	Old Athenian	
1983	Reilly: Ace of Spies	Reverend Thomas	Episode: "An Affair with a Married Woman"
1983	The Weather in the Streets	Mr. Curtis	
1983	Return of the Jedi	Anakin Skywalker	Also appears as Anakin Skywalker's force ghost in original release and 1997 Special Edition; replaced by Hayden Christensen in all DVD and Blu-ray releases since 2004
1983	The Nation's Health	Dr. Thurson	Episodes: "Collapse" and "Decline"
1984	Crown Court	Justice Bewes	Episodes: "There Was an Old Woman" and "Drunk, Who Cares"
1987	High Season	Sharp	
1988	The Master Builder	Knut Brovik	
1988	Casualty	Charles Howlett	Episode: "Drake's Drum"
1989	Chelworth	Lord Toller	
1991	Chernobyl: The Final Warning	Grandpa	
1991	Chimera	Dr. Liawski	
1992	Growing Rich	Mr. Sallace	Final Acting Role
