= Men Are Not Gods =

- Directed by: Walter Reisch
- Written by: Walter Reisch
- Screenplay by: G.B. Stern; Iris Wright
- Produced by: Alexander Korda
- Starring: Miriam Hopkins; Gertrude Lawrence; Sebastian Shaw; Rex Harrison
- Cinematography: Charles Rosher
- Edited by: Henry Cornelius; William Hornbeck
- Music by: Geoffrey Toye
- Distributed by: United Artists
- Release dates: 26 November 1936 (UK); 18 January 1937 (U.S.)
- Running time: 90 minutes
- Country: United Kingdom
- Language: English

Men Are Not Gods is a 1936 British film starring Miriam Hopkins and co-starring Gertrude Lawrence, Sebastian Shaw and Rex Harrison. It was a success in the UK when released largely due to the popularity of the two female stars Hopkins and Lawrence. This also brought to attention the talents of Rex Harrison who made his breakthrough into Hollywood not too long after this film. Gertrude Lawrence, although not so much a movie actress, was at the peak of her stage career when this film was released and her performance was praised.

== Plot ==
In London, critic Mr. Skeates dictates a scathing review of Edmund Davey, the lead actor debuting in the play Othello, to his secretary, Ann Williams. Barbara Albert, Davey's co-star and wife, comes to the newspaper offices to plead her husband's case. Skeates has already left, so she begs Ann for help to save Edmund's career, insisting that he is a great actor who was simply overwhelmed by his great opportunity. Ann is touched and takes a great risk (as Skeates never reads his own work), rewriting the review to praise the actor's performance. The critic, however, finds out when Edmund thanks him for his kind words, and Ann is given the sack.

She goes to see the play. She and the rest of the audience are entranced by Edmund's second performance. When Barbara spots her after the show, she introduces Ann to her husband. Ann and Edmund become infatuated with each other, however.

Edmund pursues Ann and even though she admits being in love with him, she won't give in to it due to respect for his wife. He eventually convinces her and they carry on an affair.

Barbara finds out about Ann and Edmund and goes to Ann pleading with her to stop the affair. Barbara also tells her she is pregnant. Ann tells her she shall have her husband back and writes him a note saying he should stay with Barbara as long as she lives.

Edmund becomes obsessed with "as long as she lives" and tries to actually strangle Barbara during a performance of Othello. Ann is in the audience and screams for him to stop. He snaps out of his trance and later in the dressing room asks Barbara for forgiveness which she gives him and they make up. She tells him to find Ann and say something nice to her. He thanks Ann for stopping him from doing something terrible and Ann leaves.

== Cast ==
- Miriam Hopkins as Ann Williams
- Gertrude Lawrence as Barbara Halson
- Sebastian Shaw as Edmund Davey
- Rex Harrison as Tommy Stapleton, a newspaper reporter in love with Ann
- A. E. Matthews as Frederick Skeates
- Val Gielgud as The Producer
- Laura Smithson as Katherine
- Lawrence Grossmith as Stanley (as Laurence Grossmith)
- Sybil Grove as Painter
- Winifred Willard as Mrs. Williams
- Wally Patch as Gallery Attendant
