= Gaudeamus International Interpreters Award =

Award and competition for contemporary music

The Gaudeamus International Interpreters Award has been offered since 1963 by the Gaudeamus Foundation to outstanding young performers winning the International Gaudemus Competition for Interpreters of Contemporary Music (Anon. 2001). The competition provides an opportunity for performers of contemporary music to meet other musicians from all over the world. During the festival workshops, master classes and concerts take place.

== First Prize winners ==
- 1963: 1st Prize not awarded
- 1964: Duo Petr Messiereur (Czechoslovakia, violin) and Jarmila Kozderková (Czechoslovakia, piano)
- 1965: Charles de Wolff (Netherlands, organ)
- 1966: Harald Boje (Germany, piano) ex aequo Zygmunt Krauze (Poland, piano)
- 1967: Duo Joan Ryall (United Kingdom, piano) and June Clark (United Kingdom, piano)
- 1968: Ronald Lumsden (United Kingdom, piano)
- 1969: Frank van Kooten (Netherlands, oboe)
- 1970: Bart Berman (Netherlands, piano)
- 1971: Doris Hays (United States, piano)
- 1972: Harry Sparnaay (Netherlands, bass clarinet)
- 1973: Michiko Takahashi (Japan, marimba)
- 1974: Herbert Henck (Germany, piano)
- 1975: Fernando Grillo (Italy, contrabass)
- 1976: Max Lifchitz (Mexico, piano)
- 1977: Toyoji Peter Tomita (United States, trombone)
- 1978: Edward Johnson (United States, clarinet)
- 1979: Mircea Ardeleanu (Romania, percussion)
- 1980: Florean Popa (Romania, clarinet)
- 1981: David Arden (United States, piano)
- 1982: Anthony de Mare (United States, piano)
- 1983: John Kenny (United Kingdom, trombone)
- 1985: Amadinda Percussion Group (Hungary, percussion)
- 1987: Stefan Hussong (Germany, accordion)
- 1989: Louise Bessette (Canada, piano)
- 1991: Tomoko Mukaiyama (Japan, piano)
- 1993: Aleksandra Krzanowska (Poland, piano)
- 1994: Margit Kern (Germany, accordion)
- 1995: Guido Arbonelli (Italy, bass clarinet)
- 1996: Helen Bledsoe (United States, flute)
- 1997: Alan Thomas (United States, guitar)
- 1999: Ralph van Raat (Netherlands, piano)
- 2001: Tony Arnold (United States, soprano)
- 2003: Philip Howard (United Kingdom, piano)
- 2005: Ashley Hribar (Australia, piano)
- 2007: Mathias Reumert (Denmark, percussion)
- 2009: Małgorzata Walentynowicz (Poland, piano)
- 2011: Brian Archinal (United States, percussion)

== Sources ==
- Anon. 2001. "Gaudeamus Foundation". The New Grove Dictionary of Music and Musicians, second edition, edited by Stanley Sadie and John Tyrrell. London: Macmillan Publishers.
- "Gaudeamus Interpreters Competition: Prize winners from the past". Music Center Netherlands.

== See also ==
- Gaudeamus International Composers Award
