= Paul Tosio =

Paul Tosio is a dual British-South African educational specialist and a psychologist qualified at the University of Oxford. He is an alumnus of New College Oxford University.

== Personal life ==
Tosio is a graduate of Rhodes University and the University of Oxford. During his first three degrees at Rhodes he was awarded full academic colours and numerous scholarships. Following this, he read for an MSc in Experimental Psychology at the University of Oxford. This was his fourth degree.

Tosio now resides permanently in Cape Town, South Africa, and travels extensively to teach.

== Study skills specialist ==
Tosio is the developer and director of the Easy Cheetah Study Skills Program and its predecessor The Juno Study Course. In this capacity he has trained study skills around the world with students from hundreds of educational institutions. These include prestigious high schools around the globe such as the Oprah Winfrey Leadership Academy for Girls, Hilton College (South Africa), Michaelhouse, Santa Fe Preparatory School, Herschel Girls School, Tanglin Trust School, St John's College, Johannesburg, St Paul's School, Brazil, Repton School Dubai, St. Andrew's College, Grahamstown, St. Cyprian's School, Cape Town, Dubai British School, Rondebosch Boys' High School, the International School Amsterdam, Sharjah English School, Brookhouse School among many others.

Tosio developed and began teaching The Juno Study Course in December 2000. The course teaches the skills which helped him succeed academically, including visual memory, speed reading, relaxation techniques and exam strategy. The program now operates as Easy Cheetah, which now incorporates various Visible Learning techniques to enhance its effectiveness.

== Media presence ==
As a study skills specialist, Tosio has frequently been featured in the media, including in regional South African papers such as Eastern Province Herald, The Randburg Sun, The Sandton Chronicle and South Africa's oldest surviving independent Newspaper the Grocott's Mail. He has contributed regularly to radio shows including Radio 702 (interviewers Jenny Crwys Williams and Eusebius McKaiser), Cape Talk (interviewers Soli Philander and Africa Melane), the BBC (interviewer Jonathan Hancock) and SAFM (interviewer Thabiso Sikwane). Through this and his publication contributions his study skills have been disseminated to millions of students around the world. Tosio has been employed by people including Raymond Ackerman and Irvin Khoza of the Orlando Pirates to train his skills.

== Theatre and Literary Work ==
Tosio has worked as actor, director and playwright. As a performer, he has frequently been praised in terms of vocal aptitude and physicality. Tosio was the title character in the premiere of Tim Benjamin’s The Corley Conspiracy. He is one of the founding members of the Oxford University Playwriting and Dramaturgy Society and frequently writes in collaboration with Dr Barbara Whitfield. Their first full-length screenplay, One Small Step, was optioned by Stanley Road Productions. The two are represented by literary agency Jenny Brown Associates in Edinburgh, Scotland.
