= Joan Ingpen =

Joan Mary Eileen Ingpen (née Williams; 3 January 1916 – 29 December 2007) was a classical music and opera talent manager and agent. Ingpen is credited with launching the career of opera singer Luciano Pavarotti. She also served as the former artistic administrator of the Royal Opera House in London.

== Biography ==
Ingpen was born in London in 1916. She enrolled at the Royal Academy of Music and studied piano. However, she initially decided to pursue a career as an insurance agent. She became acquainted with the classical music industry by attending a large number of concerts. Through her concert contacts, Ingpen was offered a job with the Entertainments National Service Association, a United Kingdom World War II era agency that provided entertainment to British military servicemen.

Following the end of World War II, Ingpen established her own classical music talent management agency, Ingpen & Williams in 1946. The Ingpen & Williams agency was named for herself and her pet dachshund, Williams, whom she considered to be co-founders of the agency Her early clients during the 1950s included conductors Sir Georg Solti, Geraint Evans and Rudolf Kempe, as well as Joan Sutherland. She was keen to cast British singers, including David Ward, William McCue and William McAlpine.

Ingpen sold Ingpen & Williams in 1961 to become the artistic administrator of the Royal Opera House that same year. However, she remained actively involved in her former agency. In 1963, Ingpen heard in Dublin a young Italian tenor, Luciano Pavarotti, whose potential she recognised immediately. She booked him as substitute/stand-in singer for Giuseppe di Stefano in a revival of La Bohème, offering him the role of Rodolfo for the final performance. Pavarotti took Covent Garden by storm and his performance earned him critical praise and helped to launch his career as an internationally renowned tenor.

== Retirement ==
Ingpen retired from the industry in 1984 and returned to her home near Brighton, England. However, she continued to work, this time with the Metropolitan Opera in New York City as a vocal consultant, until her retirement from that institution in 1987.

== Death ==
Joan Ingpen died at her hometown of Hove, England, on 29 December 2007, after a short illness. She was 91 years old. She had been married twice and had no children. In Brighton, she lived with her partner, actor Sebastian Shaw, who predeceased her.
