= Amadinda Percussion Group =

Hungarian percussion ensemble

Amadinda Percussion Group is a percussion ensemble that was formed in Budapest in 1984 by four musicians, who had just graduated from the Ferenc Liszt Academy of Music.

Since founding the ensemble, their aim has been twofold: to present masterpieces of percussion music unknown to the Hungarian audience, and to perform the music of Hungarian contemporary composers in their country and abroad. One of their principal intentions is to inspire Hungarian and international composers to create new pieces. In recent years, they have also sought to research traditional percussion cultures, to perform original pieces by members of the group, and to transcribe outstanding works for percussion instruments.

From the very beginning, Amadinda has cooperated with world-famous artists like John Cage (recording his complete works for percussion), Steve Reich, Bruno Canino, Peter Eötvös, Rosemary Hardy, András Keller, Zoltán Kocsis, György Kurtág, György Ligeti, András Schiff, Zoltán Jeney and Istvan Marta.

== Members ==
- Zoltán Rácz
- Zoltán Váczi
- Aurél Holló
- Károly Bojtos

== Awards ==
- 1984 Stipendium Prize, Darmstadt
- 1985 Gaudeamus International Interpreters Award, Amsterdam, First Prize
- 1986 Prize of Hungarian Composers’ Association for outstanding interpretation of Hungarian works
- 1987 Recording of the Year by Hungaroton
- 1988 Ferenc Liszt Prize by the Hungarian Government
- 1991, 1998 Prize of Society ARTISJUS Hungarian Bureau for the Protection of Authors’ Rights
- 1997 Order of Merit of the Hungarian Republic
- 2002 Chevalier de l’ordre des Arts et des Lettres (Z. Rácz)
- 2004 Kossuth Prize by the Hungarian Government
- 2006 Pro Urbe Budapest Prize
