= Anthony Gilbert (composer) =

British composer (1934–2023)

- Born: 26 July 1934; London, England
- Died: 5 July 2023 (aged 88)
- Education: Trinity College of Music; Morley College; Tanglewood
- Occupations: Composer; Academic teacher
- Organizations: Schott; Royal Northern College of Music; New South Wales State Conservatorium

Anthony Gilbert (26 July 1934 – 5 July 2023) was a British composer and academic, long associated with the Royal Northern College of Music. He also taught for extended periods as head of composition at the New South Wales State Conservatorium. His works, many of them for larger chamber ensembles, were published by Schott and University of York Music Press. Several of them were written for particular musicians, who performed and recorded them. He wrote a memoir, published in 2021.

== Biography ==
Gilbert, who was born in London on 26 July 1934, trained initially as a translator, then studied composition privately with Mátyás Seiber, piano with Denis Holloway at Trinity College, and composition with Alexander Goehr and Anthony Milner at Morley College. He also studied with Gunther Schuller at Tanglewood.

He worked for the London branch of Schott, beginning as a warehouseman and later chief editor of contemporary music, and head of production. In 1970 he moved north, first as Granada Arts Fellow at Lancaster University, and then to the Royal Northern College of Music, as tutor and later head of the school of composition and contemporary music, where he stayed until retirement in 1999. He worked for extended periods as head of the composition department of the New South Wales State Conservatorium during the 1980s. Amongst his students were Sally Beamish, Tim Benjamin, Martin Butler, Simon Holt, Adam Johnson, Paul Newland, Priti Paintal, Janet Owen Thomas, James Saunders, Jane Antonia Cornish and Ian Vine.

Gilbert was an active committee member of the Society for the Promotion of New Music, the music section of the ICA, the ISCM's British and Sydney sections, and the new music panel of North West Arts. He was a founding member and artistic director of both the New Music Forum, Manchester, and the Akanthos Ensemble at the Royal Northern College of Music. His publishers were Schott Music, for works prior to 1994, and then University of York Music Press. He enjoyed lasting friendships with other composers, including Harrison Birtwistle, Don Banks, Alexander Goehr and David Lumsdaine.

He began writing a memoir in 2014, focusing on the work in the months preceding his 87th birthday; it was published as Kettle of Fish in 2021.

Gilbert was married twice, and divorced twice. His first marriage was to Mary Hill, in 1956. Hill and Gilbert had three children.

His second marriage in 1978 was to Alison Cox, who became the first head of composition at the Purcell School for Young Musicians, where she has taught since 1988, and also founded a musical charity, the Commonwealth Resounds.

Gilbert died on 5 July 2023, at age 88. His three children, seven grandchildren, and three great-grandchildren survive him.

== Music ==
Gilbert was a prolific composer from the early 1960s, writing the majority of his works for instrumental or chamber ensemble.

He wrote about composing:

Ultimately, for me, the only honest thing to do in composing is to write straight from the heart and guts, whilst closely involving the brain. Trying to assess what my audience would like to hear, to be "accessible", would to me seem cheap and patronising.

The Piano Sonata No. 1 (1962) was his first published composition. It was selected for the 1962 ISCM Festival and premiered by Margaret Kitchin at the Cheltenham Festival. Early ensemble pieces include Brighton Piece and Nine or Ten Osannas (both 1967), and works especially written for The Fires of London, such as The Incredible Flute Music (1970) and Spell Respell for basset clarinet and piano (1973). From the 1970s he produced a series of larger orchestral compositions such as the Symphony (1973) and Ghost and Dream Dancing (1974), which he called "in effect, a second symphony", as well as two operas: The Scene-Machine (1970, for the Staatstheater Kassel) and The Chakravaka-Bird (1977, for BBC Radio). Compositions for smaller orchestra during this period included Crow-Cry (1976, written for the London Sinfonietta), and Towards Asvari for solo piano and chamber orchestra (1978, written for Peter Lawson and the Manchester Camerata).

During the following decade smaller scale works were his primary focus. Moonfaring for cello and percussion (1983) has also been performed with dancers. There are a trilogy of humorous pieces based on the imaginary Chinese bestiary of Jorge Luis Borges: Quartet of Beasts (1984). Beastly Jingles (1985) and Six of the Bestiary (1985). Other works from this time include Dream Carousels for wind ensemble (Gilbert's most-performed work, written for RNCM conductor Timothy Reynish) and the orchestral song-cycle Certain Lights Reflecting. Both were inspired by writings of the Tasmanian poet Sarah Day. Igórochki, a recorder concerto written for John Turner, was completed in 1992 and there was a lyrical violin concerto, On Beholding a Rainbow (1997), recorded in 2005 with soloist Anthony Marwood.

Although not noted for his interest in traditional forms, Gilbert composed four piano sonatas (the most recent in 2022) and a cycle of five string quartets spanning the years 1972 to 2009. The third quartet has been recorded by the Nossek String Quartet (1999), the Madawaska Quartet (2009) and the Bingham Quartet (2014), and the fourth by the Tavec Quartet (2009). There is also a string trio, Humdance (2007) and a string quintet, Haven of Mysteries, premiered by the Carducci String Quartet with cellist Guy Johnston at the Wigmore Hall on 14 June 2015. He wrote an extended essay on the British String Quartet since 1935.

=== Works ===
Gilbert's compositions include:

==== Piano ====
- Elegy, 1961
- Piano Sonata No. 1, 1962
- Piano Sonata No. 2 (piano 4-hands), 1966
- Little Piano Pieces, 8', 1972
- O alter Duft (withdrawn), 1984
- Funtoons: children's pieces (MS), 8', 1985
- Peal III (MS), 2', 1984
- Piano Sonata No. 3 autour des palombes, 15', 2001
- People Pieces (for beginners and on), 15', 2005
- Papillon Postcards (3 miniatures for solo piano), 2', 2005
- Passing Bells, 3', 2006
- Do Well: 8 short pieces, 15', 2009
- Some Say: 11 short pieces for solo piano, 11', 2009
- Chimes in Time, 3', 2010
- Propel, 7', 2010
- Monsoon Toccata, 4', 2013
- Piano Sonata No. 4, 2022

==== Instrumental ====
- Strophics for violin & piano, 1961
- Duo for violin and viola, 1963
- The Incredible Flute Music for flute and piano (Peal I), 1968
- Spell Respell for electric basset clarinet and piano, 1968
- Treatment of Silence for violin and tape, 1969
- Crow Undersongs for solo viola, 11', 1981
- Sunrising for oboe and piano (commissioned and published by Forsyth Bros. Ltd., Manchester), 3', 1981
- Two Birds by Kuring-Gai for horn and piano (commissioned and published by Forsyth), 6', 1982
- Moonfaring for cello and percussion, 19'-30', 1983
- Dawnfaring for viola and piano 15', 1984
- Peal IV for organ (MS), 2', 1984
- O alter Duft for piano duet (withdrawn), 1990
- Paluma for sopranino recorder and piano (arranged from movement IV of Igórochki) (MS), 4', 1993
- Trying to make John SLOW DOWN AFTER 50 for sopranino recorder and piano (Forsyth), 1993
- Ziggurat for bass clarinet and marimba, 21', 1994
- Stars for treble recorder and guitar (rev. 2004), 13', 1995
- Flame Robin for sopranino recorder solo (Forsyth), 1', 1995
- Miss Carroll her Lullabye for sopranino recorder and piano (Forsyth), 1995
- Chant-au-clair for sopranino recorder and piano (Forsyth), 1995
- Midwales Lightwhistle Automatic for sopranino recorder and piano (Forsyth), 1996
- Réflexions, Rose nord for bass clarinet and vibraphone, 5', 1996
- Osanna for Lady O for cello and piano (rewritten 2007), 8', 1997
- Ondine – chant au clair de lune for soprano and recorder (Aloysius Bertrand) (MS), 6', 1998
- Os for oboe and vibraphone (revised 2002), 16', 1999
- Margareeting for tenor or descant recorder and piano (MS), 2', 2000
- Sinfin for vibraphone solo (also arranged for vibraphone duo), 8', 2000
- Worldwhorls for bass clarinet solo, 8', 2000
- Photos found at Hukvaldy, August 1928 for oboe solo, 5', 2000
- Farings for sopranino recorder and piano (Forsyth), 15', 2000
- Kauri for solo Tuba, 11', 2002
- Tulip Tree Dances for solo bass and treble recorders, 15', 2003
- Rose luisante for solo freebass accordion, 9', 2003
- Litany for clarinet and piano (Associated Board Spectrum series), 2', 2004
- Catercorny, four pieces for clarinet and piano (contains Litany above), 6', 2004
- Swallowtail for solo vibraphone, 2', 2004
- Halifenu Vine Dance for organ and pre-recorded organ, 9', 2005
- U-Go for Arirang for variable instruments, 4', 2005
- A Piece of Cake for treble recorder and piano (MS), 80", 2006
- Jugalbandi Blues for bass clarinet solo, 60", 2006
- Echo for solo trumpet (Cincuentas 5), 4', 2007
- Twirlpool for flute and viola, 3', 2008
- Gioco dei Pari for violin & viola (reworking of Duo of 1962), 10', 2008
- Tulip Dance, for solo flute (arranged from Tulip Tree, 2003), 5', 2008
- Twinned Set, seven short pieces for solo bassoon (and Set 2 for bass clarinet), 18', 2008
- Converse, for bass clarinet and tenor saxophone, 9', 2010
- Inseparable, for alto flute or oboe and string trio, 7', 2010
- Recitative, for solo trombone, 8', 2010
- Running Free, for tenor saxophone solo, 6', 2010
- Above all that, for recorder and piano, 3', 2011
- Early to Bloom, for tenor recorder and harpsichord, 3', 2011
- Rapprochement for piano and cello, 8', 2011
- Songline, for double bass and piano, 3', 2011
- Behind all this, for descant recorder and harpsichord, 3', 2012
- Dançando con Flores, for solo guitar, 5', 2012
- DancE-a-Triple-Round, for recorder and cello, 2', 2012
- Outflow, for solo double bass, 3', 2012
- Pilbara Park, for solo guitar, 10', 2012
- Skipping side to side, for solo banjo, 5', 2012
- Behind all this, for recorder and piano, 3', 2012
- Haunted, for solo bass guitar, 5', 2013
- The Flame has Ceased (in memory John McCabe), 2016
- Verse for solo double bass (written for David Hayes), 2019
- Duologue – small sonata for viola & piano, 8'45", 2020
- Tulip Dance 5 – ‘Spring Dance’ music for bass recorder and tuned percussion, intended for ballet-type dance, 4'44", 2021
- A Breath for Life brief song for John Turner's 80th birthday, 2023

==== Chamber music ====
- Serenade for 6 instruments, 1963
- Brighton Piece for 8 players, 1967
- Nine or Ten Osannas for 5 players, 1967
- O'Grady Music for clarinet, cello and toy instruments, 24', 1971
- String Quartet No. 1 (also available in arrangement with piano), 22', 1972
- Canticle I (Rock-Song) for wind instruments, 9', 1973
- Canticle I (Rock-Song) version 2 for woodwind, horns, harp & piano, 9', 1979
- Calls around Chungmori for chamber ensemble and participating audience, 15', 1979
- Vasanta with Dancing for chamber ensemble (dancer optional), 17', 1981
- Bendigo Match for wind band (MS), 3', 1981
- Concert Fanfare for Strathfieldsaye for 5 brass and 2 percussion (MS), 1', 1981
- Little Fantasy on Gold-digger Melodies for flute and string quartet (MS), 4', 1981
- Little Dance of Barrenjoey for flute, clarinet, viola and cello (MS), 2', 1981
- Quartet of Beasts for 3 wind instruments and piano, 13', 1984
- Six of the Bestiary for saxophone quartet, 12', 1985
- Fanfarings for 6 and 8 brass instruments (MS), 1', 1986
- String Quartet No. 2 (revised 2003), 19', 1987
- String Quartet No. 3 super hoqueto 'David', 7', 1987
- Tree of Singing Names for chamber orchestra, 15', 1989
- Fanfaring V for brass (MS), 1', 1992
- Moon comes up, Pearl Beach (June '79) for alto flute, vibraphone and cello (version 2, MS lost), 1', 1995
- Dancing to the Tune for 4–8 oboes, 2–4 cors anglais, 1–2 heckelphones (MS), 4', 1996
- Sinfin 2 for 4 vibraphones, 8', 2000
- Unrise for ten wind instruments, 16', 2001
- Four Seasons for Josca's for young players (variable ensemble), 3', 2001
- String Quartet No. 4, 23', 2002
- Ondine (version 2, extended) for soprano, recorder, cello and harpsichord, 11', 2003
- Palace of the Winds for 11 solo strings, 15', 2003
- Tinos for soprano, clarinet and vibraphone (text Magdalena Mismareza), 3', 2004
- Dark Singing, Dancing Light for bassoon and string quintet or string ensemble, 10', 2005
- ecco Eco for flute, clarinet & vibraphone (Cincuentas 4), 50", 2007
- HumDance for string trio, 20', 2007
- York Surprise for flute, clarinet and bass clarinet, 8', 2007
- Word-Chimes in the Wind for wind quintet, 18', 2008
- String Quartet No. 5, 20', 2009
- Not for the Nashties, septet for three woodwind and string quartet (unpublished), 14', 2012
- Hope's Place for chamber ensemble, 18', 2013
- Tryptych for three winds and string ensemble, 16', 2014
- Haven of Mysteries, string quintet, 2015
- La Douceur, septet for three winds and string quartet, dedicated to Raymonde Sassoon, 11'15", 2016
- Return of the St Louis, trio for oboe, clarinet in A and bassoon, 9', 2017

==== Choral and vocal ====
- Missa Brevis for unaccompanied choir, 1965
- Assonants 1 for SATB soloists, clarinet and horn, 1965
- Three War Poems for chorus, 1966
- Shepherd Masque for young voices, 1968
- Love Poems for soprano and instrumental ensemble (2 versions), 10', 1970
- Cantata: the man who tried to hijack an airliner, 16' (withdrawn), 1971
- Canticle II (Anger) for 6 male voices, 6', 1974
- Inscapes for soprano, speaking voice and small ensemble, 30', 1975
- Long White Moonlight for soprano and electric double bass, 18', 1980
- Chant of Cockeye Bob for children's voices and instruments, 14', 1981
- Victorian Round for any number of voices (MS), 1981
- Beastly Jingles for soprano and instrumental ensemble, 11', 1984
- Certain Lights Reflecting, song-cycle for mezzo-soprano and orchestra to poems of Sarah Day, 19', 1989
- Upstream River Rewa for storyteller and Indo-European ensemble, 29', 1991
- Little Cycle for Elizabeth Yeoman for soprano, cello and piano (MS), 7', 1992
- Handles to the Invisible for a cappella choir to poems of Sarah Day (rev. 2003), 15', 1995
- 'This Tree' (Frances Horovitz) (No. 1 of Love Poems, 1970, arr. mezzo and piano) (Schott), 3', 1996
- Vers de Lune for soprano, flute, cello and percussion to texts by Aloysius Bertrand (incorporating a version of Ondine – chant au clair), 17', 1999
- Encantos, song-cycle to Spanish symbolist love poetry for soprano or mezzo, clarinet, vibraphone and guitar to texts by Magdalena Mismareza and anon.), 14', 2004
- Ygg-drasill for soprano or mezzo, recorder, oboe, clarinet, bassoon, trumpet, three violins and cello (Cincuentas 3), 9', 2006
- En Bateau, after Watteau for soprano, recorder, oboe, violin and cello to poems by Baudelaire and Proust), 9', 2007
- Those Fenny Bells for treble, counter-tenor and vibraphone (to a poem by John Clare), 3', 2008
- Encantos 2010 (Mismareza) for soprano or mezzo-soprano + ensemble of 8 instruments (alternative re-scoring of Encantos of 2004), 14’30", 2010
- Peace Notes, (Sarah Day) for soprano or mezzo-soprano and piano, 14', 2011
- Placing Art, (Ian Kemp) for soprano and bass recorder, 4', 2012
- Lay the Lances, five songs for baritone and string orchestra, 2018

==== Orchestral ====
- Sinfonia for chamber orchestra, 1965
- Regions for two orchestras, 1966
- Peal II for big band, 1968
- Symphony (incorporates modified version of Regions), 39', Cheltenham Festival, 1973
- Ghost and Dream Dancing for orchestra, 19', 1974
- Crow-Cry for chamber orchestra, 20', 1976
- Welkin for orchestra, 11', 1976
- Koonapippi for youth orchestra, 6', 1981
- Dream Carousels for wind orchestra, 13', 1984
- Mozart Sampler with Ground for orchestra, 10', 1991
- ...into the Gyre of a Madder Dance for concert band, 7', 1994
- Another Dream Carousel for string orchestra, 8', 2000
- Even in flames, / the Thames/ can't hold a candle/ to the Wandle for variable orchestra, 6', 2000
- Sheer for string orchestra, 16', 2003
- Dance Concerto – Groove by chants, for orchestra, 19', 2006
- Loopy Line-dance orchestral wind, 7', 2011
- Lifelines, roundelay for orchestra, 10', 2020
- Liaison, tone poem for medium-sized orchestra, 11'17", 2021

==== Concertante ====
- Mother, for solo cello and ensemble (withdrawn), 14', 1969
- Towards Asâvari for piano and chamber orchestra, 22', 1978
- Igórochki, concerto for recorder, 1992
- On beholding a Rainbow, concerto for violin and orchestra, 30', 1997
- A Melding, concerto for B♭ clarinet and chamber ensemble, 14', 2019

==== Opera ====
- The Scene-Machine, one-act opera to a libretto by George MacBeth, 50', 1970
- The Chakravaka-Bird, radio opera to a libretto translated from Indian sources by A. K. Ramanujan, Daniel H. H. Ingalls and A. Gilbert, 77', 1977

==== Arrangements ====
- Guillaume de Machaut: Ma fin est mon commencement, arr. for recorder ensemble with tambour (MS), 4', 1981
- Arthur Benjamin: Two Jamaican Street Songs, arr. for piano four-hand (Boosey), 1990
- Mátyás Seiber: Burlesque from Pastorale & Burlesque, arr. for recorder and piano; or for recorder and string trio (Schott), 2005

=== Recordings ===
- Nine or Ten Osannas - Music Projects London/Bernas - NMC D 014 (1993)
- Beastly Jingles - Jane’s Minstrels/Montgomery - NMC D 025 (1995)
- Chant-au-clair - Postern PPD 003 (1997)
- Midwales Lightwhistle Automatic - Tabernacle TABIP 1 (1997)
- Moonfaring - BML 026 (1998)
- Farings - Forsyth FS001/002 (1999)
- String Quartet No. 3 super hoqueto ‘David’ - Nossek String Quartet - ASC CS CD11 (1999)
- Dream Carousels, Quartet of Beasts, Igórochki, Six of the Bestiary, Towards Asávari - RNCM Wind Orchestra and New Ensemble - NMC D 068 (2000)
- MANCHESTER ACCENTS - Northern Chamber Orchestra, dir. Nicholas Ward - ASC CS CD45 (2001)
- Another Dream Carousel - Northern Chamber Orchestra dir. Nicholas Ward - ASC CS CD45 (2001) and Prima Facie PFCD 003 (2011)
- On Beholding a Rainbow, Certain Lights Reflecting, ...into the Gyre of a Madder Dance, Unrise - NMC D 105 (2005)
- String Quartet No. 4 - Tavec String Quartet - Campion Cameo 2046 (2006)
- Stars - Turquoise Guitar Editions, TGE 015 (2006)
- Os - Dutton CDLX 7180 (2007)
- Jugalbandi Blues - Shoepair DVD 701 (2007)
- Another Dream Carousel - Manchester Chamber Ensemble, dir. Richard Howarth - Dutton CDLX 7207 (2008)
- Those Fenny Bells - NMC D 150, disc 1 (2009)
- String Quartet No. 3 super hoqueto ‘David’ - Madawaska Quartet - ART 039 (2009)
- Doubles - Endymion Ensemble dir. Quentin Poole - NMC D 160, disc 1 (2010)
- Ondine; En Bateau, d’après Watteau - Prima Facie PFCD 004 (2011)
- Piano sonatas 1 - 3, Little Piano Pieces, Elegy, 3 Papillon Postcards - Prima Facie PFCD 007 (2011)
- Palace of the Winds - Goldberg Ensemble, dir. Malcolm Layfield - NMC D 174 (2011)
- 3 Papillon Postcards - NMC D 181 (2011)
- Réflexions, Rose nord - Atoll ACD 212 (2011)
- Dream Carousels for Wind Orchestra - National Youth Wind Ensemble of Great Britain, cond. Phillip Scott - Mark Records 9560 MCD (2011)
- Chimes in Time, Propel, Chatkwell, Toll, John’s Peal, Farewell, Speedwell, Duelo - Prima Facie PFCD 013 (2012)
- Above all that - Divine Art dda 21217 (2012)
- Piano Sonata No. 3 - Benjamin Powell - UHC 02001 1026 (2012)
- String Quartet No. 3 super hoqueto ‘David’ - Bingham Quartet - Prima Facie PFCD 032 (2014)
- DancE-a-Triple Round - Birthday tribute for David Ellis for recorder and cello - Prima Facie PFCD 037 (2014)
- Travelling with Time - Ygg-drasill, Papillon Postcards, En Bateau, Piano Sonata 3, Another Dream Carousel, Rapprochement, String Quartet No. 3 - Prima Facie PFCD 041 (2015)
- Haven of Mysteries for String Quintet, on: ‘Bracing Change’ - Chamber works commissioned for and recorded at Wigmore Hall, London - NMC D216 (2017)
- A Shooting Star - Music by Janet Owen Thomas and Anthony Gilbert - Prima Facie PFCD063 (2018)
- Zustandsformen - works for recorder and guitar - Stadt Baden Aargauer (2020)
