= Ralph van Raat =

Dutch classical pianist

Ralph van Raat (born 1978) is a Dutch classical pianist. Van Raat performs regularly as a soloist with orchestras and at important festivals. Since 2006, Van Raat has had an exclusive contract with Naxos. His first recording was the complete piano works by John Adams. In 2025, he released a recording of Arvo Pärt's piano repertoire. He teaches contemporary piano interpretation at the University of Amsterdam. Van Raat has won a large number of prizes and awards, including first prize at the Gaudeamus International Interpreters Award competition and an international Borletti-Buitoni Fellowship.

== Early life and education ==
Ralph van Raat graduated with honors from both the Conservatory and the University of Amsterdam (musicology).

== Career ==
Pianist and musicologist Ralph van Raat appears as a recitalist in Europe, Asia, Australia and the United States. Augmenting traditional repertoire, he takes special interest in the performance of contemporary classical music. He has worked closely with many composers on the interpretation of their piano works, with John Adams, Louis Andriessen, Tan Dun, György Kurtág, Magnus Lindberg, Arvo Pärt, Frederic Rzewski and Sir John Tavener. Many composers have dedicated their piano compositions to van Raat.

Ralph van Raat performs regularly as a soloist with orchestras including London Sinfonietta, the BBC Symphony Orchestra, the Shanghai Philharmonic, the Royal Concertgebouw Orchestra, the Rotterdam Philharmonic Orchestra, the Los Angeles Philharmonic, Melbourne Symphony Orchestra, Guangzhou Symphony Orchestra and the Dortmunder Philharmoniker. He has worked closely with conductors including Tan Dun, Valery Gergiev, JoAnn Falletta, David Robertson, Yannick Nézet-Séguin, Susanna Mälkki, Stefan Asbury and John Adams.

He has performed as a soloist at important festivals including the Gergiev Festival, the BBC Proms, the Festival International de Musique de Besançon, Holland Festival, the Time of Music festival in Viitasaari, Finland, Huddersfield Contemporary Music Festival in the UK, the Berliner Festspiele, the Hong Kong Festival of the Arts and Tanglewood Summer Festival in the United States. He has been given his own concert series at both the Concertgebouw and Muziekgebouw of Amsterdam, and Rotterdam's De Doelen.

Since 2006, Van Raat has had an exclusive contract with Naxos. His first recording for Naxos (the complete piano works by John Adams) received top ratings in several magazines.

In 2018, Van Raat performed his début at both New York's Carnegie Hall and the Philharmonie in Paris, both to sold out halls, standing ovations and rave reviews.

In 2025, he released a recording of Arvo Pärt's piano repertoire.

He teaches contemporary piano interpretation at his alma mater and regularly gives masterclasses and lectures at several European conservatories and for many foundations and universities.

Van Raat is also a jury member of the Orléans Concours International.

== Critical reception ==
Of his album John Adams: Complete Piano Music, the San Francisco Chronicle said "van Raat gets off the a shaky start... with Phrygian Gates. But he bounces his way vigorously the neo-boogie of American Beserk and caresses the harmonies of China Gates. The Toronto Star added "van Raat captures the energy and frequent sensuality of Adams' piano music, while never flinching at the technical demands.

== Awards and honours ==
Van Raat has won a large number of prizes and awards, including:

- First Prize at the International Gaudeamus International Interpreters Award Competition in 1999
- an international Borletti-Buitoni Fellowship
- the Philip Morris Arts Award
- the Stipend-Prize during the “Internationale Ferienkurse fur Neue Musik” in Darmstadt
- the Second Prize as well as the Donemus-Prize (for Contemporary Music) of the Princess Christina Competition
- the Elisabeth Everts Prize
- the VSCD Classical Music Prize
- the Fortis MeesPierson Award of the Amsterdam Concertgebouw
- the Prijs Klassiek (Classics Prize) of the Dutch public broadcaster, NTR
- the VSCD Ovation Prize (2019)
