= Philip Howard (pianist) =

British musician

Philip Howard (born 1976) is a British-born composer and pianist, at present best known for his performances of music by Morton Feldman and Iannis Xenakis.

Howard studied in London, at the Royal Academy of Music. Taught to the age of 18 by Dr Alexander Abercrombie, his teachers at the RAM were Graeme Humphrey and Michael Finnissy.

His first success came as a composer, when in 1992 he won joint First Prize in the first BBC Young Musician of the Year Lloyds Bank Composer Award.

In 2003 Howard came to wider international recognition after winning First Prize in the Gaudeamus International Interpreters Award, as the first British winner in 35 years.

Ridley Scott's film Prometheus uses on its soundtrack a performance of Chopin's "Raindrop" Prelude recorded by Howard.

== Awards and recognitions ==
- First Prize, International Gaudeamus Interpreters Competition in 2003
- Joint First Prize, BBC Young Musician of the Year Lloyds Bank Composer Award in 1992

== Discography ==
- Decoding Skin – solo piano music of Morton Feldman, Iannis Xenakis, Michael Finnissy, Paul Newland, Max Wilson and Paul Whitty (Divine Art CD 25021)
- Maldon and other Choral Works – EXAUDI vocal ensemble, with Philip Howard and Michael Finnissy, piano duet (NMC D110)
- [rout]one – British new music group [rout] play Paul Newland, Paul Whitty and Sam Hayden. (Divine Art CD 29001)
