= Margaret Kitchin =

Swiss classical pianist

Margaret Kitchin (23 March 1914 – 16 June 2008) was a classical pianist, born in Switzerland but long resident in the United Kingdom. She was strongly associated with contemporary piano music, particularly that of Michael Tippett.

Born Margaret Rothen in Montreux, she was the daughter of an English mother and a Swiss father. She showed early promise as a pianist, attending the Montreux Conservatory and later the Lausanne Conservatory, where her teacher was Jacqueline Blancard. She married Michael Kitchin (an amateur musician and composer) in 1935, but couple separated in 1947. In late 1948 she moved to England, having made a previously visited in 1939 to obtain an LRAM diploma.

Kitchin gave many premieres. Tippett dedicated his Piano Sonata No 2 to her, and she gave its first performance at the Edinburgh Festival in 1962. Peter Racine Fricker also wrote her several works. With Kyla Greenbaum and Robin Wood she was one of the three soloists at the Proms in August 1956 performing Fricker's Concertante for Three Pianos and Strings.

Other premieres included works by Don Banks (Violin Sonata, 1953), Alan Bush, Anthony Gilbert, Alexander Goehr (Sonata in One Movement, 1952; Pezzo Dramatico for piano, 1956), Iain Hamilton, Kenneth Leighton, Elizabeth Maconchy (Piano Concertino, fp. 1951, conducted by Kathleen Merritt), Thea Musgrave, Priaulx Rainier (Barbaric Dance Suite, 1950) and Eva Ruth Spalding (Third Violin Sonata, 1952). She gave over 200 BBC recitals between 1949 and 1980.

Although she made few recordings, she did perform Tippett's first Piano Sonata and Iain Hamilton's Sonata, Op. 13 for the then new Lyrita label in 1960. There are recordings of her broadcast performances in the British Library Sound Archive.

Kitchin's second husband was music impresario Howard Hartog, who ran the Ingpen & Williams agency. They married in 1951 and stayed together, living in a Kensington flat from where they ran the agency until he died in 1990. She died at the age of 94, survived by two daughters from her first marriage.
