= David M. Arden =

US-american pianist

David M. Arden (born September 6, 1949) is an American concert pianist whose performing and recording career has focused predominantly on contemporary and American classical repertoire, including premiere performances and first recordings of piano works by a number of notable contemporary composers, such as Henryk Górecki, Luciano Berio, Earle Brown, Carson Kievman and David Lang. The Russian composer Galina Ustvolskaya named Arden's recording of her 12 Preludes for Piano as her preferred recording of that work.

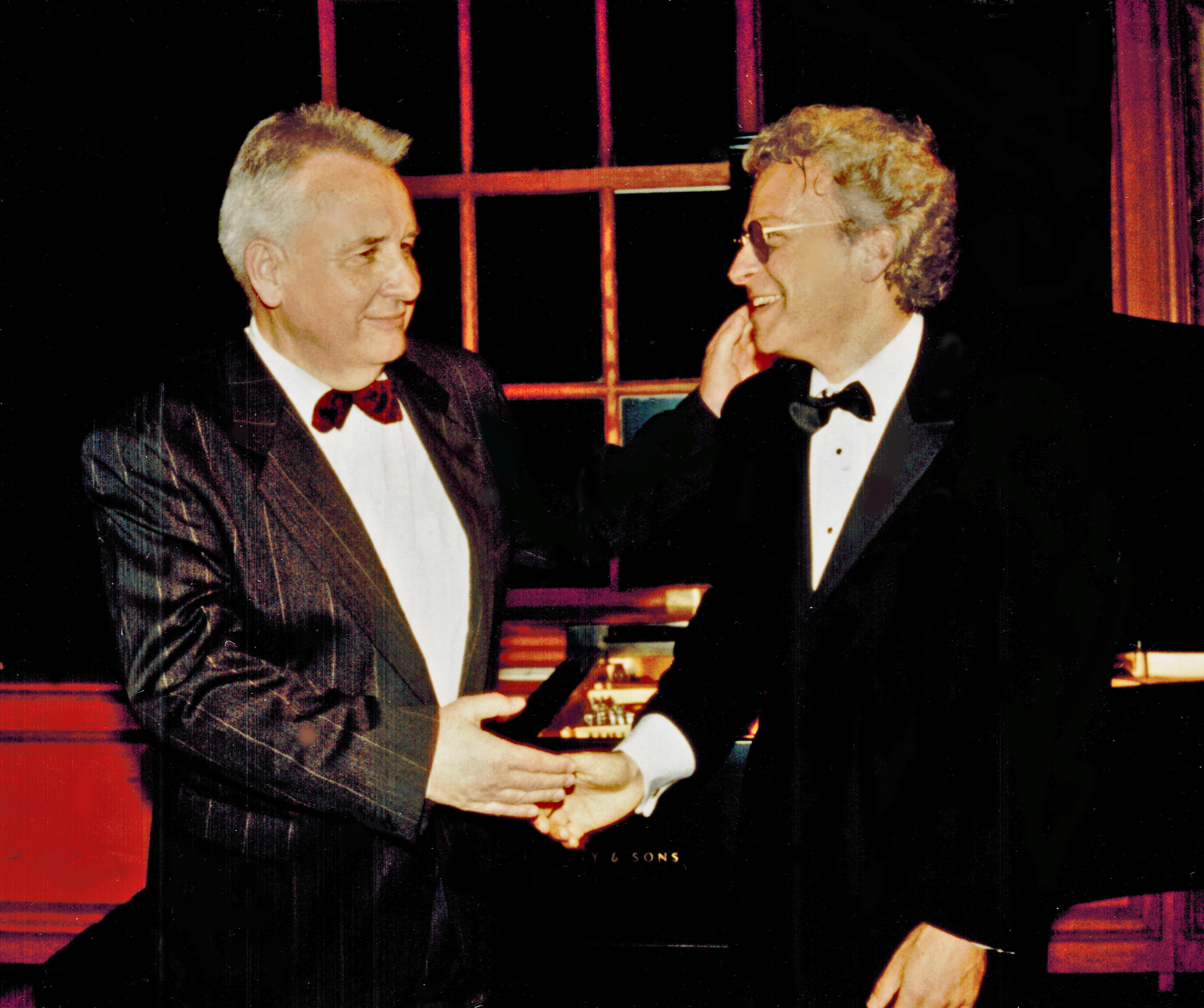
David Arden (rt.) with Henryk Górecki at Kosciuszko Foundation concert New York City, 1995

In addition to his performing career, Arden has been active as a music pedagogue, authoring the early-years piano instruction book Creative Music-Making at the Piano, establishing the New School of Piano in San Francisco, and founding Keys to Achievement Foundation, a nonprofit organization that places music keyboard instruction programs in US public schools.

== Biography ==
David Arden was born in Los Angeles. He received early piano instruction from Arthur Frazer in San Diego. Arden went on to study with Aube Tzerko at UCLA (Los Angeles), Lucy Brown at Peabody Conservatory of Music (Baltimore), Frederic Gevers at the Royal Flemish Music Conservatory (Antwerp, Belgium), and Aloys Kontarsky at the Cologne Musikhochschule (Cologne, Germany).

Arden received his Concert Diploma (Hoger Diploma) from the Royal Flemish Music Conservatory in 1974 and subsequently won a number of awards: 1st place at the Tenuto-Young Virtuosos Competition (Brussels, Belgium); 1st place at the Gaudeamus International Competition for Interpreters of Contemporary Music (Rotterdam, the Netherlands); and the Kranichsteiner Musikpreis (Darmstadt, Germany).

Arden has performed in concert and radio/TV broadcasts in Europe, the Far East and South Asia, South America, Australia, New Zealand, South Africa, and the US. His commercial recordings have covered piano repertoire of George Gershwin, Leonard Bernstein, Samuel Barber, André Previn, Henryk Górecki, Arvo Pärt, Galina Ustvolskaya, Luciano Berio, Earle Brown and Carson Kievman.

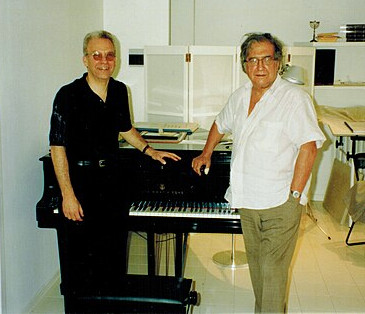
David Arden (lft.) with Luciano Berio in Berio's Florence studio in 1996

Arden was selected as a touring artist for the United States Information Agency’s Arts America Program from 1978 to 1981. He was also the recipient of a Meet The Composer/Arts Endowment Commissioning Music Grant in 1997 (for a new work by David Lang) and an Asian Cultural Council’s Japan Fellowship Grant in 2001.

From 1981-1984, Arden served as the piano soloist for American Ballet Theatre (New York), performing solo piano and concerto repertoire with the company on tour and at the Metropolitan Opera House in New York.

In the area of music education, Arden was Visiting Professor of Piano at the University of California, San Diego from 1979-80 and then in 1985 founded the New School of Piano in San Francisco. He is the author of "Creative Music-Making at the Piano", an instructional book for preschool age children, and then adapted that pedagogical approach for use in the early-age keyboard instruction software series "Children’s Music Journey" (published by Adventus Interactive).

In 2000, Arden established Keys to Achievement Foundation, a nonprofit organization dedicated to providing public schools, particularly those serving low-income populations, with a cost-efficient music keyboard instruction program.

== Discography ==
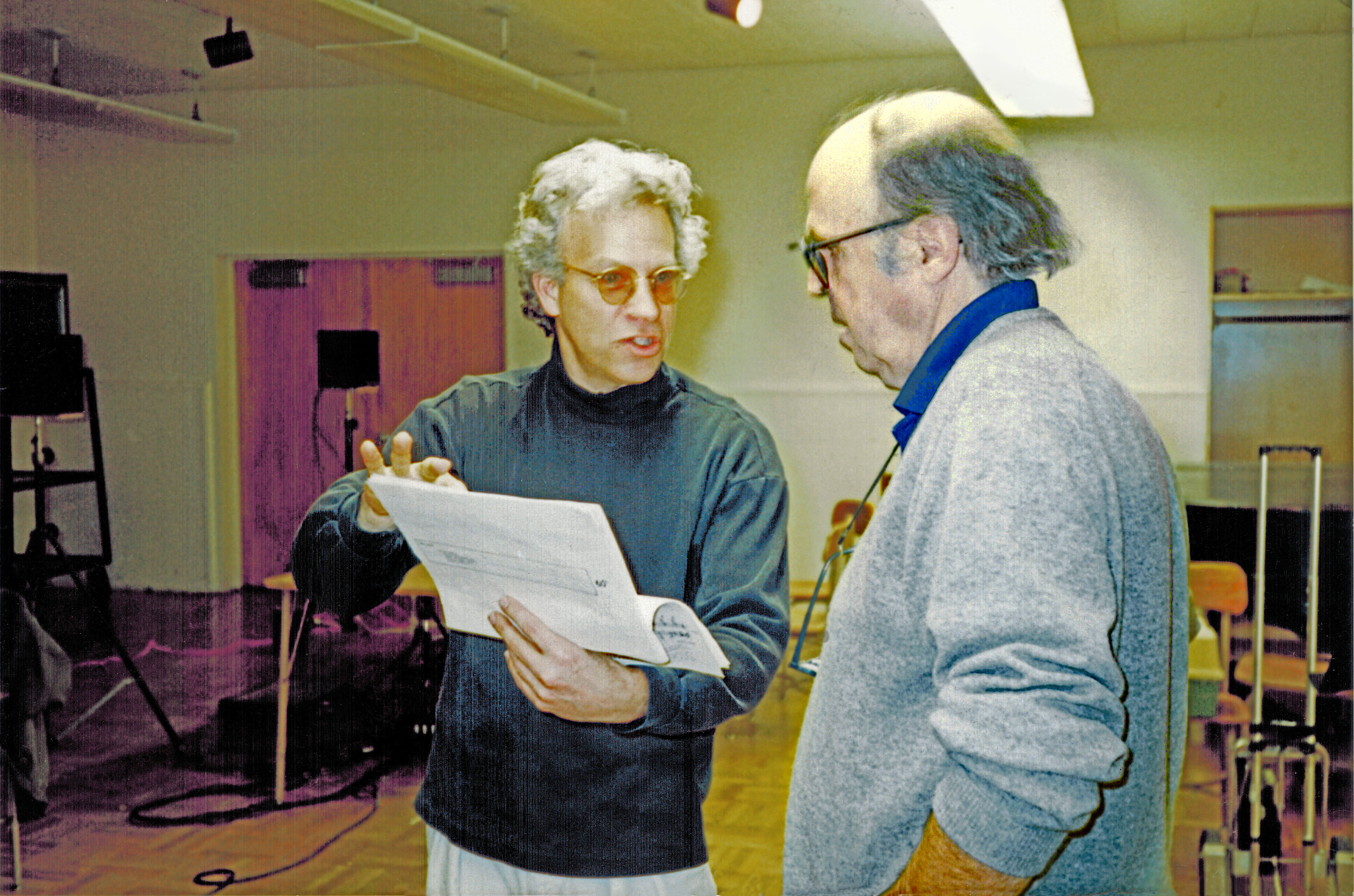
David Arden (lft.) with Earle Brown in recording session (San Francisco), 1995

- American Piano Music. LP/Musica Magna 50 017 (1976)
- Górecki, Pärt, Ustvolskaya: Solo Piano Works. CD/KOCH International 3-7301-2H1 (1995)
- Earle Brown: Music for Piano(s) 1951–1995. CD/New Albion Records NA082 (1996)
- Luciano Berio: The Complete Works for Solo Piano. CD/New Albion Records NA089 (1996)
- Women of Note. CD/ CD/KOCH International Classics 3-7603-2H1 (1997)
- Carson Kievman: The Temporary & Tentative Extended Piano. CD/CRI CD845 (2000)
- Darmstadt Aural Documents Box 1. CD/NEOS 11060 (2010)

== Sources ==
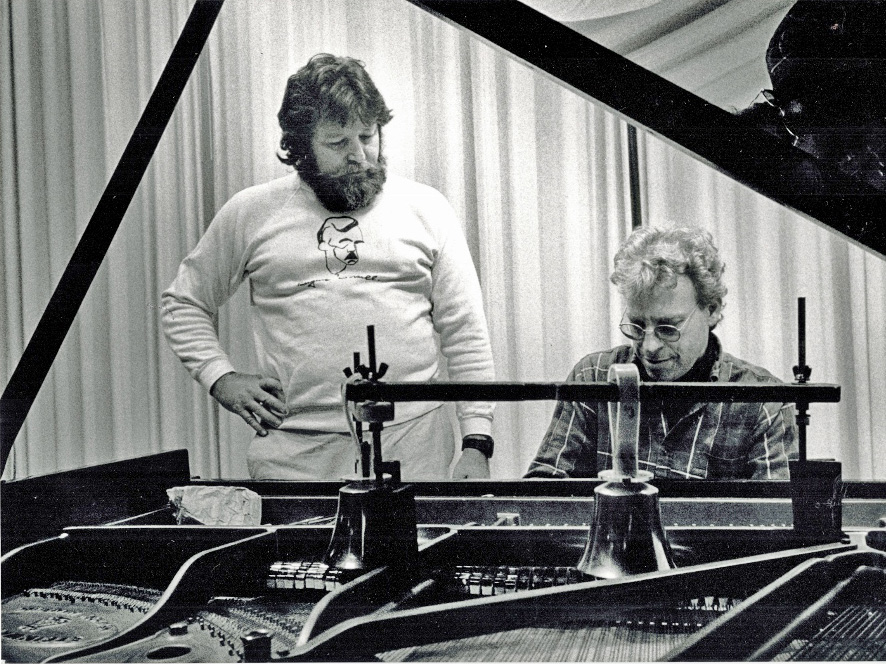
David Arden (rt.) rehearsing with Carson Kievman (Amsterdam), 1993

1. Internationales Musikinstitut Darmstadt, Kranichsteiner Musikpreis Chronologie
2. Wikipedia: Gaudeamus International Competition Winners List
3. "Mystical, Minimal and Now Onstage", New York Times, 27 Oct 1993
4. "Earle Brown: From Motets to Mathematics", Contemporary Music Review, Vol 26, Issue 3–4, 17 July 2007
5. Earle Brown Music Foundation
6. http://www.mysteryparkarts.org/Arden.html
7. "Berio: Complete works for solo piano", BBC Music Magazine, March
8. "Koncert Góreckiego w Fundacji Kościuszkowskiej", Nowy Dziennik (Polish Daily News), 3–4 June 1995
9. "Steelpan concerto just exhilarating", Chicago Tribune, 15 Nov 1995
10. "Composer Carson Kievman", SunSentinel, 30 May 1991
11. Fanfare, Nov/Dec 1995
12. Time Out New York, 14-21 Feb 1996
