= Martin Butler (composer) =

British composer

- Born: 1960 (age 65–66); Romsey, Hampshire, England
- Education: Royal Northern College of Music, Universities of Manchester and Princeton
- Occupations: Professor of Music, University of Sussex

Martin Butler (born 1960 in Romsey, Hampshire, England) is a musician and composer of classical music. He studied at the University of Manchester and the Royal Northern College of Music with Anthony Gilbert. In 1983 he received a Fulbright Award for study at Princeton University, USA, where he was resident until 1987, and in 1985 he received the Master of Fine Arts.

In 1988 he was awarded the Mendelssohn Scholarship which enabled him to spend several weeks at Tempo Reale, Berio's studio in Florence, and in 1994 was awarded an Honorary Fellowship of the Royal Northern College of Music. From September 1998 to July 1999 Martin Butler was Composer-in-Residence at the Institute for Advanced Study in Princeton in the United States. He is currently Professor of Music at the University of Sussex.
