= Paul Newland =

English composer & musician

Paul Newland is a composer, musician, and founding member of the group [rout], and the electric guitar duo, exquisite corpse (David Arrowsmith/Paul Newland).

He studied composition at the Royal Northern College of Music with Anthony Gilbert and visiting tutor Harrison Birtwistle, at the Royal Academy of Music in London with Michael Finnissy and at Royal Holloway, University of London with Simon Holt receiving his doctorate in 2006. While a student at the Royal Academy of Music, György Ligeti awarded Newland the Josiah Parker prize for composition. In 1999, he was awarded a Japanese government Monbusho scholarship to study with Japanese composer Jo Kondo, and lived in Japan from 1999 to 2002.

Recent commissions and performances include Difference is everywhere (2017) for the Elias String Quartet, commissioned by the Wigmore Hall Trust, things that happen again (again) (2017) for Music We'd Like to Hear, and Angus MacPhee (2015) commissioned by Ilan Volkov for the BBC Scottish Symphony Orchestra and premiered in Glasgow at Tectonics 2015.

He has made several works in collaboration with choreographer and dancer Marina Collard including what this is, is... (2016), going on - going on (2015) and shellsuit (2015).

Many of his works have been written for and premiered by [rout] including; readymade 2 (1997), standing jump (2002), situation 2 (2007), husk (2009), nicholas givotovsky (2012) and holywell (2015).

Other works include : surface for the London Symphony Orchestra commissioned for their Soundscape Pioneers series, Repetition and difference and Come gather... (solo piano) for Tim Parkinson, 1-4 (solo harpsichord) for Jane Chapman, monotonous forest for ensemble Radius commissioned by the Britten Foundation premiered at the Wigmore Hall, patina and essays in idleness (solo guitar) for David Arrowsmith and momiji gari for Japanese guitarists Norio Sato and Toshimitsu Kamigaichi.

The electric guitar duo, exquisite corpse, has performed at London's Vibe Bar, Café Oto, and Cakey Muto. As part of the ongoing project graft, exquisite corpse created a series of semi-improvised works with choreographer Mari Frogner, giving performances at Crondell St. Underground Car Park Shoreditch, The Book Club Spitalfields and The Old Police Station Deptford. The duo performed common wealth a work created specifically for the derelict Commonwealth Institute building on Kensington High Street. This new piece was created in collaboration with choreographer Mari Frogner and commissioned by Fruits of the Apocalypse for their Common Sounds project at Kensington and Chelsea Festival.

Newland is currently writing a solo piano piece for Satoko Inoue.

In 1994, he received the Paul Hamlyn Foundation Award for Composition. He received the New Millennium Composers Award in 2010.

He is a Professor of Composition at Guildhall School of Music and Drama in the Barbican, London. He is also Professor at Trinity Laban Conservatoire of Music and Dance, Greenwich.

== Works ==
His works include:

- Difference is everywhere (2017) for string quartet
- Things that happen again (again) (2016) for piano trio
- What this is, is... (2016) dancer, giant latex cube, music/sound, film, still images and light
- going on - going on (2015) solo dancer, prepared electric guitar, film projection
- shellsuit (2015) dance, music for two electric guitars (prepared), spoken text and projected film
- holywell (2015) sax, e guit, piano, vn, db, field recordings
- Aldwych (2015) seven sine tones and seven spatially dispersed speakers
- Come gather... (2015) for Tim Parkinson (solo piano)
- Repetition and difference (2014) for Tim Parkinson (solo piano)
- locus (2013) any instruments, acoustic objects, recorded sounds
- nicholas givotovsky (2012) for [rout] sax, eguit., piano, vn, db
- patina (2011) for David Arrowsmith (solo guitar)
- surface (2009) orchestra
- husk (2009) for [rout] sax, egit, piano, vn, db and Okeanos ob.cl.va.shakuhachi.sho.koto
- monotonous forest (2009) 'cello, piano, vibes
- shellac (2009) sinfonietta
- time quivers (2008) fl.cl.perc.vn.vc
- 1-4 (2007) for Jane Chapman (solo harpsichord)
- situation 2 (2007) for [rout]
- Shadows and Dust (2005)
- Standing Jump (2002) for violin, guitar, harmonium and harpsichord
- Shukkeien (2001) violin and piano
- Essays in Idleness (2001) solo guitar
- butterfly dreaming (2000) for piano
- pachinko! (2000) field recording (Hiroshima) and guitar effects pedals
- slow dance (2000) looped recordings of dance movement and voice (Marina Collard)
- ashita gakko e ikimasu (2000) computer generated voice (three part canon)
- no[w]here (1999) for 3 simultaneous video tapes and optional minidisc
- being-as-it-is (1999) for 2 flutes, 2 oboes, 2 clarinets, 2 bassoons, 2 horns, 2 trumpets, vibraphone 6.6.4.4.2 strings
- readymade 2 (1997)

as well as a book called Writings through John Cage (2003), published by Contemporary Voices (BMIC)
