= Tim Benjamin (composer) =

English composer

Tim Benjamin (born 1975) is an Anglo-French composer and technology executive. His compositional output centres on opera, with eight stage works premiered since 1998, alongside orchestral, chamber, and choral music. He won the BBC Young Musician of the Year Composer's Award in 1993 at the age of seventeen, and the Stephen Oliver Prize for Contemporary Opera in 1996. His Symphony received its world premiere at the George Enescu Festival in Romania in 2021, and he serves on the jury of the George Enescu International Competition. Also a senior technology executive, he is currently Chief Technology Officer at Softwire, a UK technology consultancy.

== Early life and education ==
Benjamin was born in 1975, grew up in North London, and attended Christ's Hospital school. He studied composition at the Royal Northern College of Music under Anthony Gilbert, graduating with a first-class BMus Honours degree. He also studied privately with Steve Martland, in whose memory he later created and funds the Steve Martland Scholarship. He subsequently completed a DPhil at the University of Oxford under Robert Saxton, with his thesis The Economics of New Music examining the funding and commissioning of contemporary classical composition.

He lives in Todmorden, West Yorkshire.

== Career ==
=== Early recognition ===
Benjamin's compositional talent emerged early. At seventeen, while still a student at Christ's Hospital, he won the 1993 BBC Young Musician of the Year Composer's Award for Antagony, a substantial work scored for two large wind bands, amplified strings, and six percussionists. The work was performed by the London Sinfonietta under conductor Martyn Brabbins and broadcast on BBC Two television and BBC Radio 3.

In 1996, Benjamin won the Stephen Oliver Prize for Contemporary Opera for his first opera, The Bridge, with a libretto by playwright David Edgar. The prize, worth £10,000, was awarded to a young composer for a new work of opera. During 1997 and 1998, the Stephen Oliver Trust worked with the Royal Northern College of Music and the BOC Covent Garden Festival to stage the winning opera; both The Bridge and the 1994 winner David Horne's Travellers were brought to the stage in June 1998 as part of the Covent Garden Festival. The Bridge was also performed at the ISCM World Music Days in Manchester.

=== Opera ===
Opera dominates Benjamin's catalogue, with works ranging from brief one-act pieces to full-length productions.

The Corley Conspiracy (2007), commissioned by the London Design Festival, premiered at the Purcell Room, Southbank Centre. The 75-minute work is based on the paranoid Usenet postings of one "Mike Corley" during the 1990s. The Guardian's Guy Dammann wrote that "its broken, cracked lyricism speaks profoundly to contemporary humanity" and urged readers: "Corley's story is one that needs to be told, and it is told using music that needs to be listened to."

Le Gâteau d'anniversaire (2010), an allegorical comedy opera in French, was commissioned by CNIPAL (France's national professional lyric artist training centre). The world premiere took place in March 2010 at the Foyer of the Opéra de Marseille, with bass Geoffroy Buffière in the role of Louis. The UK premiere followed at the Purcell Room, Southbank Centre, with soprano Laura Sheerin as Marie.

Emily (2013) addressed the suffragette Emily Wilding Davison, who died after stepping in front of the King's horse at the 1913 Epsom Derby. The two-hour opera, to Benjamin's own libretto, premiered at the Hippodrome Theatre in Todmorden, West Yorkshire.

Madame X (2014), with a libretto by Anthony Peter, drew on Jacobean revenge tragedy filtered through Handel and Mozart's Italian opera traditions. Premiering at the Grimeborn Festival at the Arcola Theatre, it toured the UK including the Royal Northern College of Music. Opera magazine wrote: "Tim Benjamin refreshingly provided an opera that succeeds in sustaining interest over nearly two hours... The fluent, well-crafted score offers some striking moments." The Guardian noted that "Benjamin directs the opera himself with considerable theatrical flair."

Life Stories (2015), a double-bill comprising R.I.P. (based on Chekhov) and Silent Jack (about the legendary female highwayman Lady Katherine Ferrers), premiered at the Tête-à-Tête Opera Festival. Bachtrack critic Charlotte Valori wrote: "Tim Benjamin gives a masterclass in how to create a one-handed opera twice over... If Harold Pinter had ever written an opera, this would surely be it."

The Fire of Olympus; or, On Sticking It To The Man (2019), with libretto by Anthony Peter, is a large-scale opera retelling the Prometheus and Pandora myth in a contemporary, dystopian setting. Zeus appears as an authoritarian president, undermined by activists led by the prankster Prometheus. The musical language draws heavily on Handel's Italian operas but is sung in modern English, employing opera seria conventions of recitative and aria.

The production was developed in collaboration with Emma Stafford, Professor of Greek Culture at the University of Leeds, as part of her AHRC-funded "Hercules: a Hero for All Ages" research project. The Classical Association provided funding for a distinctive feature: a "virtual chorus" comprising the digitally combined voices of over 1,000 amateur singers recruited through workshops with choirs across the North and Midlands of England.

The opera toured nationally to eight UK venues between 14 September and 9 November 2019. A presentation previewing the work took place at the FIEC/Classical Association congress in London on 7 July 2019. Benjamin discussed the opera in a BBC Radio 3 broadcast interview.

A film version, produced by East View Film with Benjamin as director, was premiered in Leeds on 16 November 2019 and subsequently released on the streaming platform Marquee TV. UK Film Review noted that "Director Tim Benjamin's focus is on performances first" and praised the work as "a unique and innovative opera". The cast comprised Sophie Dicks as Prometheus, Robert Glyndwr Garland as Zeus, Charlotte Hoather as Pandora, Michael Vincent Jones as Hephaestus, and Elspeth Marrow as Epimetheus.

=== Orchestral music ===
Benjamin's Symphony (2021) was commissioned for the George Enescu Festival's 25th Jubilee Edition. The four-movement work draws on the story of dictator Nicolae Ceaușescu's destruction of Bucharest's historic Uranus or Dealul Spirii district to build the monumental Palace of the Parliament.

The world premiere took place on 9 September 2021 in Timișoara and 11 September 2021 at the Radio Hall in Bucharest, performed by the Banatul Philharmonic Orchestra of Timișoara under conductor Rumon Gamba. The concert was broadcast live across Europe. Festival Executive Director Mihai Constantinescu stated: "It's a true honour to premiere the first symphony of Tim Benjamin, a respected jury member of the Enescu International Competition."

Benjamin's symphony was one of a record number of world premieres at the 2021 festival, alongside works by Jonathan Dove, Mihnea Brumariu, Fred Popovici, and Adrian Iorgulescu. As part of the festival's "Music of the 21st Century" series, Benjamin participated in the International Composers' Forum alongside composers including Salvatore Sciarrino, Jonathan Dove, and Patrick Hawes.

A Piano Concerto followed, composed for Swedish pianist Peter Jablonski. Earlier orchestral works include Un Jeu de Tarot (1997), commissioned by the BBC Philharmonic, and Möbius, commissioned by the European Community Chamber Orchestra.

Yes, I remember (for string orchestra) was performed at the 2017 George Enescu Festival by the London Chamber Orchestra under Christopher Warren-Green. The Classical Source's Richard Whitehouse described it as "a thoughtful take on the English string tradition".

There Is Nothing Here (2024), for orchestra and soprano, received its world premiere on 19 September 2024 at Madetoja Hall in Oulu, Finland, performed by Oulu Sinfonia with soprano Emma Mustaniemi and conductor Adomas Morkūnas. The work was composed as a companion piece to Jean Sibelius's tone poem Luonnotar, sharing its creation mythology subject matter. The orchestra's programme notes described Benjamin as "a master of styles, whose next move is impossible to predict".

=== Choral and vocal music ===
Benjamin's choral works include settings of Anglo-Saxon poetry. His album Paths of Exile (2024), recorded by Kantos Chamber Choir conducted by Ellie Slorach, comprises settings of The Wanderer and The Seafarer, both poems from the Exeter Book. The works are scored for male voices with an "immersive audio soundtrack". Music critic Nick Holmes wrote of The Seafarer: "This recording by Kantos Chamber Choir draws out both the humanity of the music and its asceticism, the sense that the seafarer is a secular martyr to his fate on the cruel sea."

Other vocal works include Mrs Lazarus (2009), with text by UK Poet Laureate Carol Ann Duffy premiered at the Southbank Centre, and the oratorio Herakles (2016–17), based on the myth of the Choice of Hercules, which premiered at Yorkshire's Todmorden Town Hall in April 2017 as part of the University of Leeds "Hercules: a Hero for All Ages" research project. Benjamin and Emma Stafford subsequently co-authored a chapter on the oratorio's creation, "'I Shall Sing of Herakles': Writing a Hercules Oratorio for the Twenty-First Century", in the Brill academic volume Hercules Performed (2024); the Bryn Mawr Classical Review described their contribution as "particularly compelling".

=== Radius Opera ===
In 2007, Benjamin co-founded the ensemble Radius with composer Ian Vine, who had been a contemporary at the Royal Northern College of Music from 1994–1997. The ensemble's model draws on the 1960s collective The Fires of London, with core instrumentation derived from Schoenberg's Pierrot Lunaire: flute, clarinet, violin, cello, piano, and percussion.

Operating as a registered charity in England and Wales, Radius has performed at major London venues including the Purcell Room at the Southbank Centre and Wigmore Hall. Classical Music magazine praised the group's debut performances: "The performance by the young contemporary music ensemble Radius was exceptionally assured."

Radius Opera has produced touring productions of Benjamin's stage works throughout the UK and France.

== International recognition ==
Benjamin maintains significant international connections, particularly with Romania, France, and Finland. In France, his opera Le Gâteau d'anniversaire was commissioned by CNIPAL and premiered at the Opéra de Marseille in 2010. His orchestral work Yes, I remember was performed at the 2017 George Enescu Festival by the London Chamber Orchestra under Christopher Warren-Green, and his Symphony received its world premiere at the 2021 Festival. He serves as a jury member for the George Enescu International Competition in the composition category. In Finland, his orchestral work There Is Nothing Here received its world premiere by Oulu Sinfonia in 2024, performed alongside Sibelius's Luonnotar.

At the 2022 competition, the composition jury under president Zygmunt Krauze included Benjamin alongside Dan Dediu, Adrian Iorgulescu, Peter Ruzicka, Hubert Stuppner, and Cornel Țăranu. At the 2024 competition, Benjamin served alongside composers Pascal Dusapin, Jennifer Higdon, Magnus Lindberg, and Outi Tarkiainen.

=== Production music ===
Benjamin's library music, released through labels including KPM Music, Universal, and JW Media Music, is broadcast internationally on networks from the BBC to ESPN. His album Cinematic Piano for JW Media Music won PRS for Music's PRS Foundation Award for Best Newcomer at the 2017 Production Music Awards.

== Technology career ==
Benjamin maintains a parallel career in technology. He is currently Chief Technology Officer at Softwire, a UK technology and strategy consultancy specialising in digital transformation, artificial intelligence, and DevOps practices across regulated sectors including financial services, government, energy, and healthcare.

He founded Caiman Technologies in 1999, creating interactive television software deployed in millions of European homes. He also co-founded Clements Theory, an e-learning resource for music theory instruction used in schools internationally.

He has previously served as Chief Technology Officer of Fictioneers, a WPP-incubated startup in the interactive storytelling space, where he led the project bringing Wallace and Gromit into augmented reality. At Infinity Works (now part of Accenture), he held the title of "Chief Storyteller". He has also served as CTO of the Continuo Foundation, a funder of early music performance in the UK.

== Selected works ==
=== Opera ===
Title	Year	Librettist	Premiere venue
The Bridge	1996	David Edgar	ISCM World Music Days / Covent Garden Festival
The Corley Conspiracy	2007	Sean Starke & Tim Benjamin	Purcell Room, Southbank Centre
Le Gâteau d'anniversaire	2010	—	Opéra de Marseille (world premiere); Purcell Room (UK premiere)
Emily	2013	Tim Benjamin	Hippodrome Theatre, Todmorden
Madame X	2014	Anthony Peter	Grimeborn Festival
R.I.P.	2015	Tim Benjamin (after Chekhov)	Tête-à-Tête Festival
Silent Jack	2015	Anthony Peter & Tim Benjamin	Tête-à-Tête Festival
The Fire of Olympus	2019	Anthony Peter	UK tour (8 venues); film premiere Leeds 2019

=== Orchestral ===
- Antagony (1993) — for two wind bands, amplified strings, and six percussionists
- Un Jeu de Tarot (1997) — BBC Philharmonic commission
- Möbius — European Community Chamber Orchestra commission
- Yes, I remember — for string orchestra; performed by London Chamber Orchestra at George Enescu Festival 2017
- Symphony (2021) — George Enescu Festival world premiere
- Piano Concerto (2022) — composed for Peter Jablonski
- There Is Nothing Here (2024) — for orchestra and soprano; world premiere by Oulu Sinfonia

=== Choral and vocal ===
- Mrs Lazarus (2009) — text by Carol Ann Duffy
- Herakles (2016–17) — oratorio; premiered Todmorden Town Hall, April 2017; subject of co-authored chapter in Brill's Hercules Performed (2024)
- The Wanderer (2024) — for male voices and immersive audio
- The Seafarer (2024) — for male voices and immersive audio

== Discography ==
- Paths of Exile (2024) — Kantos Chamber Choir, Ellie Slorach (conductor)
- The Fire of Olympus (2020) — opera film, released on Marquee TV
- Life Stories (2016) — double-bill opera recording
- Cinematic Piano (2017) — JW Media Music (PRS Foundation Award winner)

== Selected publications ==
- Benjamin, Tim. The Economics of New Music (DPhil). University of Oxford.
- Stafford, Emma; Benjamin, Tim (2024). "'I Shall Sing of Herakles': Writing a Hercules Oratorio for the Twenty-First Century". In Stafford, Emma (ed.). Hercules Performed: The Hero on Stage from the Enlightenment to the Early Twenty-First Century. Metaforms. Vol. 25. Leiden: Brill. ISBN 9789004695757.

== Awards and honours ==
- BBC Young Musician of the Year Composer's Award (1993)
- Stephen Oliver Prize for Contemporary Opera (1996)
- PRS Foundation Award for Best Newcomer, Production Music Awards (2017)

== Legacy ==
In 2015, Benjamin founded the Steve Martland Scholarship for young composers at the Sound and Music Summer School, in honour of his former mentor.
