= Simon Holt =

English composer (born 1958)

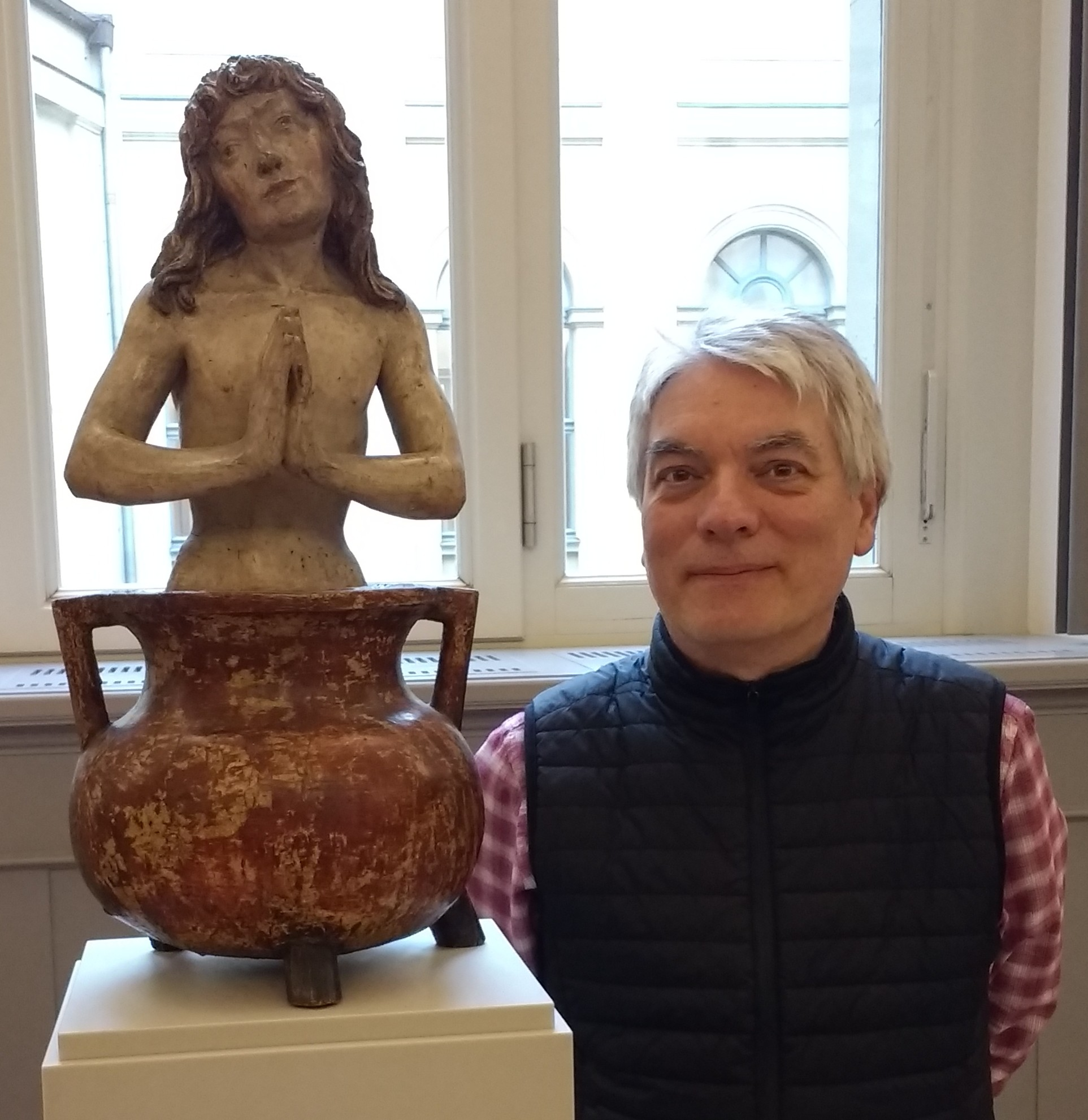
Simon Holt with a sculpture of St Vitus in the kettle in 2017

Simon Holt (born 21 February 1958) is an English composer.

== Biography ==
Simon Holt was born in Bolton, Lancashire on 21 February 1958. Educated at Bolton School, Holt immersed himself in organ, piano and visual art during his sixth form years. In 1976, he attended Bolton College of Art for a year where he fulfilled a foundation course in all areas of visual representation. Shortly before achieving a diploma in composition from the Royal Northern College of Music, where he studied with Anthony Gilbert for four years from 1978 to 1982, he received a commission from the London Sinfonietta, which became Kites (1983). He was soon firmly established with a series of commissions and fruitful collaborations including not only with the Sinfonietta, but also the Nash Ensemble and the Birmingham Contemporary Music Group, resulting in pieces such as eco-pavan (1998), Sparrow Night (1989) and Lilith (1990) respectively. Inspired by Messiaen, Xenakis and Feldman as well as visual artists such as Goya, Alberto Giacometti and Brâncuși, his music is innately dramatic and impulsive in nature. His output comprises chamber music, concertos, songs, opera, orchestral and piano music.

From 2000 onwards, Holt has written several concertos and orchestral pieces, including a table of noises (2007), a percussion concerto for Colin Currie. Holt was Composer in Association with the BBC National Orchestra of Wales from 2008 to 2014, working closely with the conductor Thierry Fischer on pieces such as Troubled Light (2008) for orchestra and Morpheus Wakes (2011), a flute concerto written for Emmanuel Pahud, both for the BBC Proms. Previously, Holt had been commissioned to write two orchestral pieces for the BBC Proms; Syrensong (1987), his first orchestral piece, written for the BBC Symphony Orchestra and the viola concerto, walking with the river’s roar (1991), for Nobuko Imai and the BBC Philharmonic. Recent commissions include the orchestral piece, Surcos (2016), for Sir Simon Rattle and the Berliner Philharmoniker and co-commissioned by the City of Birmingham Symphony Orchestra who gave the UK premiere with the conductor Ilan Volkov and the basset clarinet concerto, Joy Beast (2016), for Mark Simpson and the BBC Philharmonic as part of the New Music Biennial 2017. Simon Holt's music has been recorded on several record labels, most extensively with NMC.

Holt is currently Professor of Composition at the Royal College of Music.

=== Career highlights ===
- 1978–82 – Studied at the Royal Northern College of Music with Anthony Gilbert
- 1985 – Came to prominence as featured composer at the Bath Festival
- 1989 – Royal Philharmonic Society Award for Capriccio Spettrale
- 1998 – Featured composer at Huddersfield Contemporary Music Festival
- 2001 – Le Prix de la Fondation Prince Pierre, Monaco for Sunrise' yellow noise
- 2002 – Ivor Novello Classical Music Award for Boots of Lead
- 2004 – British Composer Award (Stage Works) for Who put Bella in the Wych elm?
- 2006 – British Composer Award (Orchestral) for witness to a snow miracle
- 2008 – Appointed Composer in Association with the BBC National Orchestra of Wales
- 2009 – British Composer Award (Orchestral) for a table of noises
- 2011 – Week long residency at the Royal College of Music featuring several performances of orchestral and chamber music
- 2015 – 3rd Quartet was premièred by the JACK Quartet at Wigmore Hall and the Internationales Musikfestival Heidelberger Frühling
- 2017 – Surcos, a co-commission from the Berliner Philharmoniker (conducted by Sir Simon Rattle) and CBSO (with Ilan Volkov), was performed three times in Berlin and opened the Berliner Philharmoniker's first appearance at the Elbphilharmonie in Hamburg
- 2017 – Basset clarinet concerto, Joy Beast, written for Mark Simpson and commissioned by the BBC, received four performances; premièred in Hull and then in London as part of the New Music Biennial 2017
- 2018 – Featured at the Aldeburgh Festival with a series of chamber pieces including two world premières

== Key works ==
- Maïastra (1981; flute solo)
- Kites (1983; chamber ensemble)
- Era madrugada (1984; chamber ensemble)
- Canciones (1986; mezzo-soprano and chamber ensemble)
- Syrensong (1987; orchestra)
- Sparrow Night (1989; solo oboe and chamber ensemble)
- Lilith (1990; small chamber ensemble)
- walking with the river’s roar (1991; viola concerto)
- Banshee (1994; oboe and percussion)
- Nigredo (1994; piano solo)
- The Nightingale’s to Blame (1996 to 1998; chamber opera)
- eco-pavan (1998; solo piano and chamber ensemble)
- feet of clay (2003; cello solo)
- witness to a snow miracle (2005; violin concerto)
- Sueños (2006; baritone and chamber ensemble)
- a table of noises (2007; percussion concerto)
- Troubled Light (2008; orchestra)
- Morpheus Wakes (2011; flute concerto)
- The Yellow Wallpaper (2011; soprano, 6 female singers and orchestra)
- Ellsworth 2 (2012; orchestra)
- Fool is Hurt (2015; piccolo concerto)
- Joy Beast (2016; basset clarinet concerto)
- Surcos (2017; orchestra)
- Quadriga (2017; percussion and string quartet)
- Serra-Sierra (2018; cello and piano)
- 3 for Icarus: Icarus Lamentations (1992; 2 clarinets, cimbalom, harp and strings), Minotaur Games (1993; orchestra), Daedalus Remembers (1995; solo cello and chamber ensemble)
- a ribbon of time: Sunrise' yellow noise (1999; soprano and orchestra), Two movements for string quartet (2001), Boots of Lead (2002; mezzo-soprano and chamber ensemble), Clandestiny (2000; soprano and organ), startled Grass (2001; solo cello, 6 sopranos, 6 altos, harp, cimbalom and percussion)
- The Bella cycle: the sharp end of night (2003; violin solo), the other side of silence (2004; chamber ensemble), The Coroner’s Report (2004; chamber ensemble), Who put Bella in the Wych elm? (2003; music theatre, baritone, soprano, violin, piano and chamber ensemble)
- Terrain: String sextet: the torturer’s horse (2009), everything turns away (2010; piano and four string players), 3rd Quartet (2013), Amapolas (2008; string trio), Telarañas (2009; violin and cello), Mantis (2005; solo viola)

== Selected recordings ==
- Canciones; Era madrugada; Shadow Realm; Sparrow Night – NMC D008
- Boots of Lead; eco-pavan; Kites; Lilith; feet of clay – NMC D094
- Tauromaquia; a book of colours; Black Lanterns; Klop's Last Bite; Nigredo – NMC D128
- Maïastra – Metier MSV CD92063
- a table of noises; St Vitus in the kettle; witness to a snow miracle – NMC D218
- 3rd Quartet – NMC D216
