= Black spider =

Black Spider may refer to:

== Arts and entertainment ==
- Black Spider (comics), a DC Comics supervillain
- Black Spiders, an English rock band
- The Black Spider, an 1842 novella by Jeremias Gotthelf.
  - The Black Spider (opera), an opera by Judith Weir
  - The Black Spider (1920 film), a British silent mystery film
  - The Black Spider (1921 film), a German silent horror film

== Other ==
- BlackSpider Technologies Limited, a British software company
- Red-faced black spider monkey, a species of monkey
- The Black spider memos, a series of letters and memorandums written by Charles III of the United Kingdom, during his tenure as Prince of Wales, to British government ministers and politicians over several years
- Lev Yashin (1929-1990), a Soviet football goalkeeper who served for Dynamo Moscow and the USSR national football team

== See also ==
- Black Spider-Man, a Marvel Comics superhero
- "Black Spiderman", a 2017 rap song by the rapper Logic
- Spider (disambiguation)
