= Brad Cresswell =

American opera singer

- Born: Chicago, Illinois
- Occupations: Radio host and producer; Opera singer (retired)
- Years active: 1990–present

Brad Cresswell is an American radio broadcaster and former opera singer who is currently based at WGTE-FM in Toledo, Ohio. He is also the creator and host of Living American Composers: New Music from Bowling Green, a radio series sponsored by Bowling Green State University and syndicated internationally by The WFMT Radio Network. Since 2012 he has hosted the popular Opera Quiz intermission feature heard during the international Metropolitan Opera radio broadcasts.

== Early life and opera career ==
Born in Chicago, Cresswell grew up in Moline, Illinois, where he sang in the Moline Boys Choir. His interest in music continued through high school, where he learned to play several instruments and also began composing. Cresswell subsequently attended Simpson College in Indianola, Iowa; the St. Louis Conservatory and School for the Arts, and Boston's New England Conservatory of Music.

Cresswell made his professional debut in Richard Strauss's opera Elektra with Seiji Ozawa and the Boston Symphony Orchestra at Carnegie Hall, a performance which was later released on Philips Records. He also performs the tenor solos in what The Penguin Record Guide calls a "unique recording" of Beethoven's Symphony No. 9 with the Boston Philharmonic Orchestra under Benjamin Zander. The recording purports to use Beethoven's original tempo markings, which differ markedly from those normally heard in modern performance.

Cresswell sang several premieres for both Opera Theatre of St. Louis and Santa Fe Opera, including Judith Weir's The Vanishing Bridegroom and Blond Eckbert. He also created the role of the poet John Lorimond in David Carlson's The Midnight Angel, to a libretto and original story by author Peter S. Beagle, which was commissioned by Opera Theatre of St. Louis, Glimmerglass Opera, and Sacramento Opera. For Chicago Lyric Opera, Cresswell created a role in Anthony Davis' opera Amistad, based on the 1839 slave revolt aboard the Spanish schooner La Amistad. Cresswell appears in the original cast recording of Amistad under conductor Dennis Russell Davies on New World Records.

Throughout the 1990s Cresswell performed regularly at the Lyric Opera of Chicago. During this time, he also made important debuts with the New York City Opera, San Francisco Opera, Washington Opera, and the Teatro Colon in Buenos Aires.

== Radio career ==
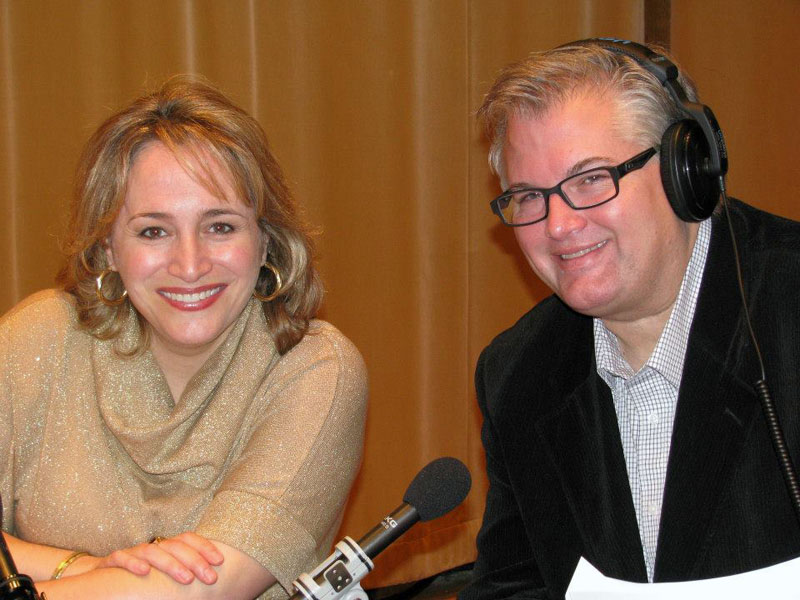
Soprano Patricia Racette with host Brad Cresswell during the Metropolitan Opera Quiz, 2012

During the early 2000s Cresswell joined the NPR affiliate in New York City, WNYC, as a music host and producer. At WNYC, Cresswell helped to create one of the first contemporary classical music services on the internet and HD radio, WNYC2. He has also made guest appearances on the popular Public Radio programs Studio 360 and Radiolab. In 2007 Cresswell received the first ASCAP Deems Taylor Multimedia Award for his work on the online music festival 24 Hours and 33 Minutes, The Playful and Playable Cage.

Cresswell has written extensively for the Metropolitan Opera Radio channel on Sirius Satellite Radio. He has also been a regular panelist for the popular Opera Quiz intermission feature heard during the Met's live Saturday matinee broadcasts. In 2012 Cresswell was named one of three revolving hosts for the Opera Quiz, which is broadcast by more than 300 stations worldwide.

In 2009 Cresswell joined WGTE-FM in Toledo, Ohio as Music Director and Host. He currently hosts a daily program of classical music which includes occasional interviews with artists. He also produces concert broadcasts from the Toledo Symphony, and hosts a monthly live performance/talk show.

At WGTE, Cresswell created a radio series called Living American Composers: New Music from Bowling Green, which is distributed by The WFMT Radio Network to more than 160 radio stations worldwide. The program features music and commentary from contemporary composers, with performances coming from the MidAmerican Center for Contemporary Music at Bowling Green State University (BGSU). Among the musicians frequently heard is Pulitzer and Grammy winning composer Jennifer Higdon, who is an alumna of BGSU.
