= Barbara White (composer) =

American composer (born 1965)

- Born: December 3, 1965 (age 60); Boston, Massachusetts, U.S.
- Occupations: Composer; clarinetist; musicologist
- Employer: Princeton University
- Awards: Guggenheim Fellowship (2003)

Academic background
- Education: Radcliffe College; University of Pittsburgh
- Thesis: Music Drama on the Concert Stage: A Study of Judith Weir's "The Consolations of Scholarship" (1997)
- Musical career
- Genre: Classical music
- Instrument: Clarinet

Barbara White (born December 3, 1965) is an American composer, clarinetist, and musicologist. A 2003 Guggenheim Fellow, she has released four albums, all but one of which she performs as the clarinetist, and she is a professor of music at Princeton University.

== Biography ==
Barbara White was born on December 3, 1965, in Boston, Massachusetts. She obtained her BA (1987) from Radcliffe College and MA (1994) and PhD (1997) from University of Pittsburgh; her doctoral dissertation was titled Music Drama on the Concert Stage: A Study of Judith Weir's "The Consolations of Scholarship".

During her early career, White was awarded a 1995 American Society of Composers, Authors and Publishers Young Composer Award, as well as both a 1997 Charles Ives Prize and Pennsylvania Council on the Arts Interdisciplinary Arts Award. Richard Buell of the Boston Globe said that her 1999 composition "No Man's Land" "took us back to the dear dead days of multiphonics and the modish unleasing of "new" tone colors, particularly from instruments you didn't think had a single chord to declare". She was later a 1999-2000 Continental Harmony Composer-in-Residence and a 2000 New Jersey State Council on the Arts Fellow, as well as a 2000-2001 Harvard Radcliffe Institute Bunting Fellow.

In The New York Times' review of Speculum Musicae's 2002 concert at Merkin Hall, Paul Griffiths praised White's piece "Learning to See" as "a real discovery" because "she writes no more notes than she needs, and she has a way of making straightforward quotations (from Varése, Stravinsky and others) her own". In 2002, her composition album When the Smoke Clears was released; it later received a re-release from New World Records in 2007. Payton MacDonald of the American Record Guide said of the album: "Barbara White creates energetic and kinetic music, reflecting her interest in performing and martial arts ... White takes advantage of the timbral possibilities and comes up with some welcome colors. She's also not a bad performer". In 2003, she was awarded a Guggenheim Fellowship in music composition. In 2004, she released her another album, Apocryphal Stories.

In 2013, White's opera Weakness, based on the Irish mythological story Ces Ulad, was released as part of the album White: Weakness – Cowan: Macha by Albany Records; Barry Kilpatrick called the album's music "strange but fascinating", noting that "it fits perfectly with this very strange story". In 2021, she released Farewell to Music, a shakuhachi album featuring Riley Lee.

White has been a member of the Princeton University faculty since 1998, when she became assistant professor of music there before eventually becoming full professor. She was the Harold Willis Dodds University Preceptor from 2001 to 2004. Her academic work focuses on the relationship between culture and the basics of music, with examples including art, dance, and film, and she has published several articles in scholarly journals. She teaches composition and music theory in Princeton.

As of 2018, White lived in Princeton, New Jersey.

== Discography ==
Title	Year	Details	Ref.
Apocryphal Stories (as composer)	2004	Released: January 1, 2004; Label: Albany Records	
When the Smoke Clears (as composer and clarinetist)	2007	Released: January 1, 2007; Label: New World Records	
White: Weakness – Cowan: Macha (as composer with Tom Cowan and clarinetist)	2013	Released: October 1, 2013; Label: Albany Records	
Farewell to Music (as composer and clarinetist)	2021	Released: November 1, 2021; Label: Albany Records	
