= Margaret Williams (film director) =

British film director (1950–2024)

Margaret Joy Williams (26 August 1950 – 14 April 2024) was a British film and television director based in London. She started her career producing and directing arts documentaries then mainly directing music and arts films for BBC, Arts Council and Channel 4. Latterly developing scripts for drama.

== Life and career ==
Margaret Joy Williams was born in Epping, Essex, on 26 August 1950.

Williams directed films for the BBC, including the dance film Cross Channel in 1992. She created a number of films with choreographer Victoria Marks, including Mothers and Daughters in 1994 and later Outside In.

The Wapping Project organised a retrospective of Margaret’s dance films in 2007. Her dance film Veterans was performed and co-created with US Veterans from the West Los Angeles combat rehab/PTSD clinic and won First Prize, the Premi Internacional VideoDansa in Barcelona in 2009. In 2011, One Man Walking, a dance film directed by Williams, was broadcast on Channel 4. The film was choreographed by Kenrick Sandy and devised with Jonzi D. Williams has also adapted stage works for the screen such as Thomas Adès's opera Powder Her Face and Judith Weir's Blond Eckbert, both for Channel 4.

Williams collaborated many times with composer Judith Weir, including on film versions of Armida (Weir), filmed in Morocco, and Owen Wingrave, an opera by Benjamin Britten.

Williams died on 14 April 2024, at the age of 73. She was survived by her partner, art director Stephanie Matthews.
