= The Black Spider (opera) =

Opera by Judith Weir

- Opera by Judith Weir
- Librettist: Weir
- Language: English
- Based on: Jeremias Gotthelf's novella Die schwarze Spinne (1842)
- Premiere: March 6, 1985; Canterbury Cathedral

The Black Spider is an opera in three acts by Judith Weir with a libretto by the composer. The work is loosely based on the 1842 novella Die schwarze Spinne by Jeremias Gotthelf.

== Background ==
The Black Spider is an opera written for young people. It merges a folk story from Switzerland with a news report from Poland. It combines mystery, history, science, horror and comedy, and requires skilled acting and singing.

Norman Platt, director of Kent Opera, described how his finance director Robin Jessel lent him a recording of King Harald's Saga by Weir. Platt was much impressed by its originality, and having listened to more of her music, he met her, and commissioned a young people's opera with funds from the Arts Council.

The work was first performed in the crypt of Canterbury Cathedral on 6 March 1985, with tenor Armistead Wilkinson and children of the Frank Hooker School; it lasts around one hour and a quarter. It was produced at the Huddersfield Contemporary Music Festival in 1995, and Welsh National Youth Opera performed the work at the Millennium Centre in Cardiff in May 2022.

Weir describes the opera's tone as "somewhere between a video nasty and an Ealing comedy".

== Synopsis ==
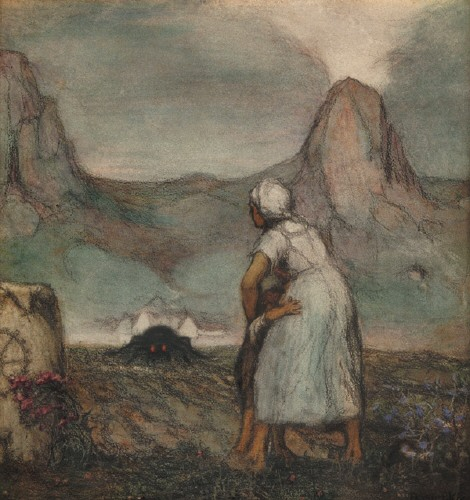
The Black Spider by Franz Karl Basler-Kopp

The opera exploits the collision of two plots and switches back and forth between a Polish legend of the Middle Ages, adapted from Die Schwarze Spinne by Jeremias Gotthelf, and a contemporary newspaper cutting about a curse on the opening of the Tomb of Casimir IV Jagiellon in Wawel Cathedral, Kraków.

The earlier story tells of villagers oppressed by a wicked landlord, the Count Heinrich, who are given the task of carrying an entire beech forest to the mountain-top where he lives. A strange Green Man appears and says he will undertake the task provided the village girl, Christina, weds him. Christina is planning to marry Carl, but nevertheless agrees to the Green Man's bargain to spare the villagers from the Count's violence. The little green man fulfills his pledge as agreed, but Christina naturally breaks her word, wedding Carl. At the ceremony a spider crawls out from her hand, and this then proceeds to cause plague and pestilence in the village. The spider manages to block the exit to the valley, and it seems impossible for the villagers to escape their ravaged home. The spider even kills Count Heinrich by biting into his brain. Finally the disaster is stopped when Christina catches the spider in her cousin Caspar's guitar, and rushes to Kraków to bury it in the tomb of the recently deceased King Casimir IV.

In the modern story, inspired by a 1983 news report in The Times, excavations are taking place at the tomb of Casimir IV, in Wawel Cathedral, Cracow. When the tomb is first opened, a small spider emerges. More and more archaeologists are affected by a deadly virus with no clue to why it is happening.

== German version ==
Conductor and composer Benjamin Gordon was asked by the Staatsoper Hamburg to revise and expand the opera for its 2008/2009 season; this version is called Das Geheimnis der schwarzen Spinne (The Secret of the Black Spider). The orchestra was expanded to full strings, augmenting the original clarinets, trumpets. The percussion parts were changed, replacing home-made instruments with traditional percussion and the guitar part by a harp. The vocal parts were transposed and arias and ensembles extended, using material based on existing motives. The addition of orchestral interludes using existing music make the work slightly longer (around 75 minutes). Gordon's orchestration is still tailored for young players, however for more advanced ones than in the original as it is rhythmically more complex. In some places the music is more Transylvanian, in others more sinister. Weir attended the premiere on 8 February 2009. The "Hamburg" version has been performed in Bonn (2010), Regensburg (2011), Dortmund (2014) and Leipzig (2017, 2018 & 2022).

In September 2025 the first UK performance of this version took place at the Grand Theatre, Leeds, by the Opera North Youth Chorus and Orchestra, conducted by Nicholas Shaw.
