= Ian Spink =

Australian-British choreographer (1947–2023)

Ian Spink (8 October 1947 – 11 October 2023) was an Australian-British choreographer.

== Life and career ==
Born in Melbourne on 8 October 1947, Spink trained at the Australian Ballet School. After graduating in 1968, he danced and choreographed for The Australian Ballet, Australian Dance Theatre and the Dance Company of New South Wales.

In 1974, he was offered a grant to tour with Merce Cunningham's dance troupes when they toured Australia. He then moved to London in 1977, and remained in the UK for the rest of his life. In 1982, Spink co-founded Second Stride along with Siobhan Davies and Richard Alston.

In 1990 he directed the premiere production of Judith Weir's opera The Vanishing Bridegroom for Scottish Opera, subsequently broadcast by BBC TV.

Spink later choreographed Petruska for Scottish Ballet at the Edinburgh International Festival. Spink was Artistic Director of citymoves Dance Agency Aberdeen, one of the three Scottish Dance Agencies (2005-2010), and created the Dance Live Festival in 2005, which continues today.

Spink was a member of The Work Room, a resource centre for independent choreographers in Glasgow, and worked as a director, as well as a performer with contemporary performance company Airfield.

Ian Spink died of lung cancer on 11 October 2023, at the age of 76.
