= Tomb of Casimir IV Jagiellon =

Tomb by Veit Stoss in Kraków, Poland

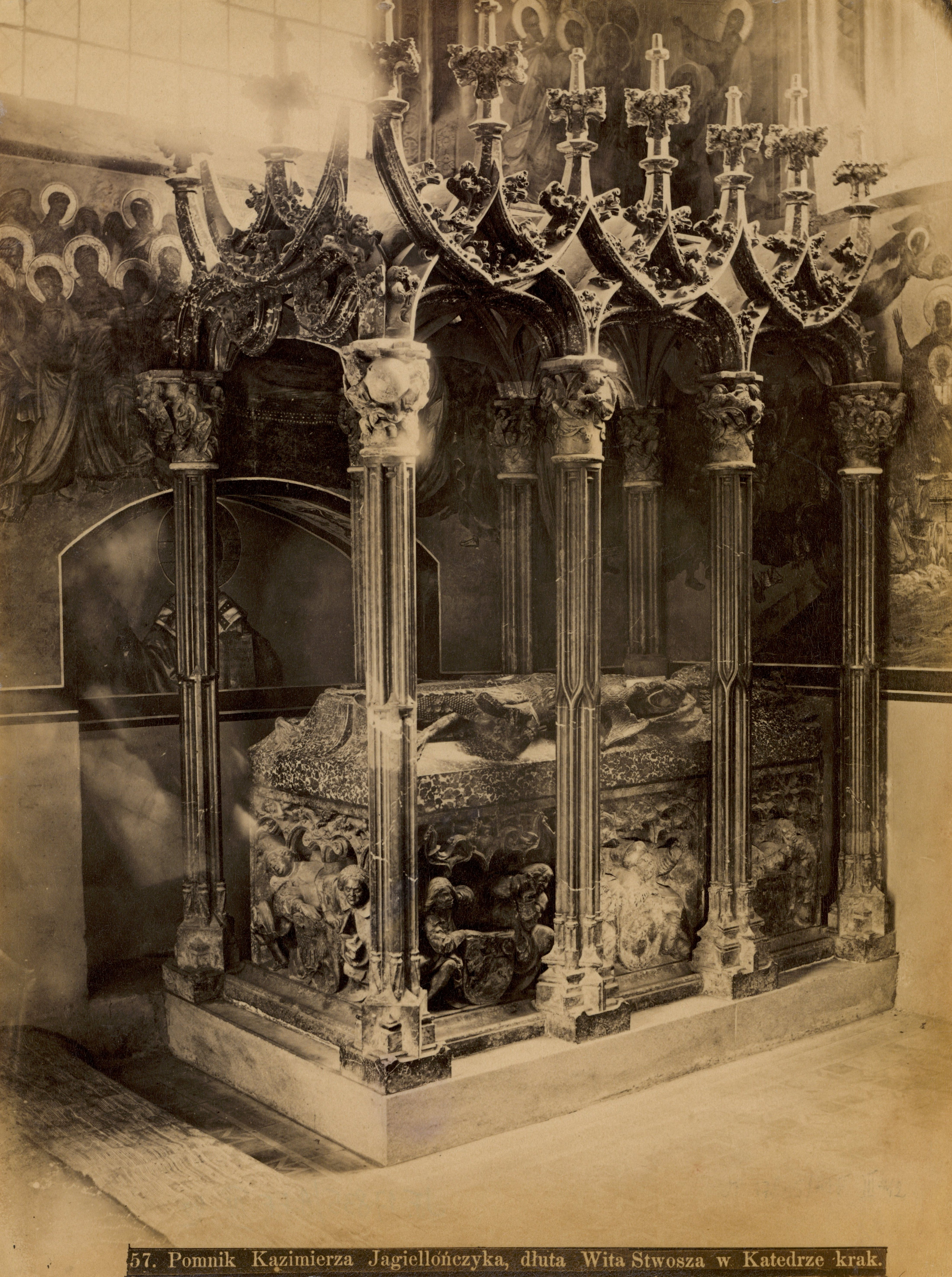
Tomb of Casimir IV in the Wawel Cathedral

The tomb of Casimir IV Jagiellon (Polish: Nagrobek Kazimierza IV Jagiellończyka), located in Wawel Cathedral, Kraków, is a late 15th century masterpiece created in red marble by German sculptor Veit Stoss in the late Gothic style. Casimir IV, a King of Poland and Grand Duke of Lithuania of the Jagiellonian dynasty, was interred in the tomb following his death in 1492. His wife, Elizabeth of Austria, was placed with him in the tomb when she died in 1505.

The tomb was opened in 1973 by a 12-man team in order to carry out conservation work. Shortly afterwards, 10 of the team died prematurely, prompting rumours of a "Jagiellonian curse". It was subsequently reported that the deaths were likely caused by a pathogenic fungus known as Aspergillus flavus that was present in the tomb. Media reports suggested that spores from the fungus had been inhaled by the conservationists as they opened the tomb.

== Background and creation ==
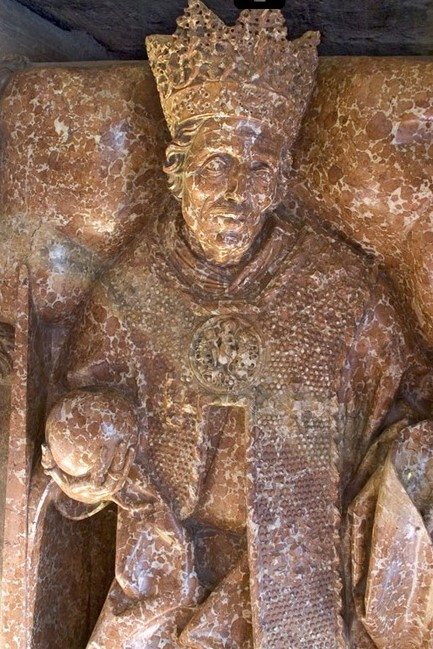
Effigy of Casimir IV lying on the tomb's sarcophagus

Casimir IV, a member of the Jagiellonian dynasty, was Grand Duke of Lithuania from 1440 and King of Poland from 1447, until his death in 1492. He had married Elizabeth of Austria in 1454.

The German sculptor Veit Stoss had moved to Kraków from Nuremberg in 1477 to work on the altarpiece of St. Mary's Basilica, carving it in wood and completing it in 1489. Stoss was then commissioned (Note: Art historians believe it was Casimir's widow, Elizabeth, who commissioned Stoss.) to create, in red marble, a tomb for Casimir in the city's Wawel Cathedral, which he worked on between 1492 and 1496. The tomb was located in the cathedral's Holy Cross Chapel, and Casimir was interred in it in July 1492. When Elizabeth died in 1505 she was interred in the tomb beside her husband.

The "Ruthenian" Holy Cross Chapel, which Casimir IV had built as a family mausoleum was painted in the Byzantine–Russian style, contains a Cyrillic inscription in Old Belarusian.

== Description and artistic legacy ==
The tomb is a late Gothic masterpiece made from mainly red marble from Adnet, near Salzburg. It is composed of a sarcophagus, over which was sculpted a canopy supported by ornate arches. The inner parts of the canopy are made from limestone from Pińczów. A full length sculpted effigy of Casimir lies on top of the sarcophagus. The effigy is highly unusual: Casimir is presented as being in agony and is dressed in a clerical cloak only used at coronations. Stoss's signature appears under the effigy's feet. The sides of the sarchophagus bear the arms of Casimir's kingdoms and territories. The canopy includes a late Gothic crown. The nature of the sculpting of the crown and arches echoes the ornate carving of wooden altarpieces at the time. The arches are supported by marble pillars, the capitals of which feature biblical scenes and are signed by Stoss's assistant, Jörg Huber of Passau.

Stoss's work is considered a masterpiece and, as a consequence of this success, he was asked to construct a series of royal tombs in Kraków. The tomb, as well as Stoss's St Mary's altarpiece, became artistically extremely influential in Poland and eastern Prussia.

== 1973 opening of the tomb ==
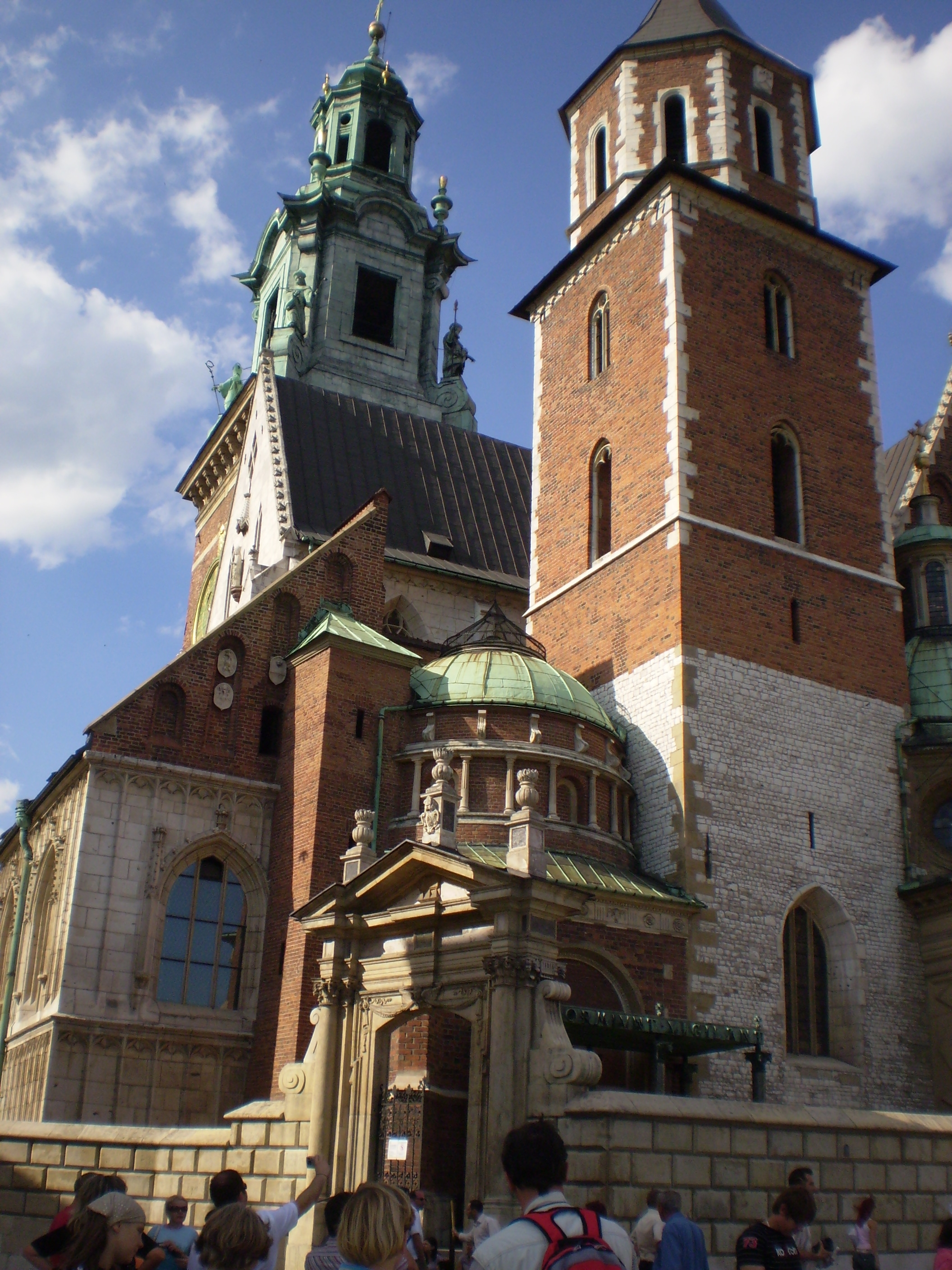
Holy Cross chapel, location of the tomb

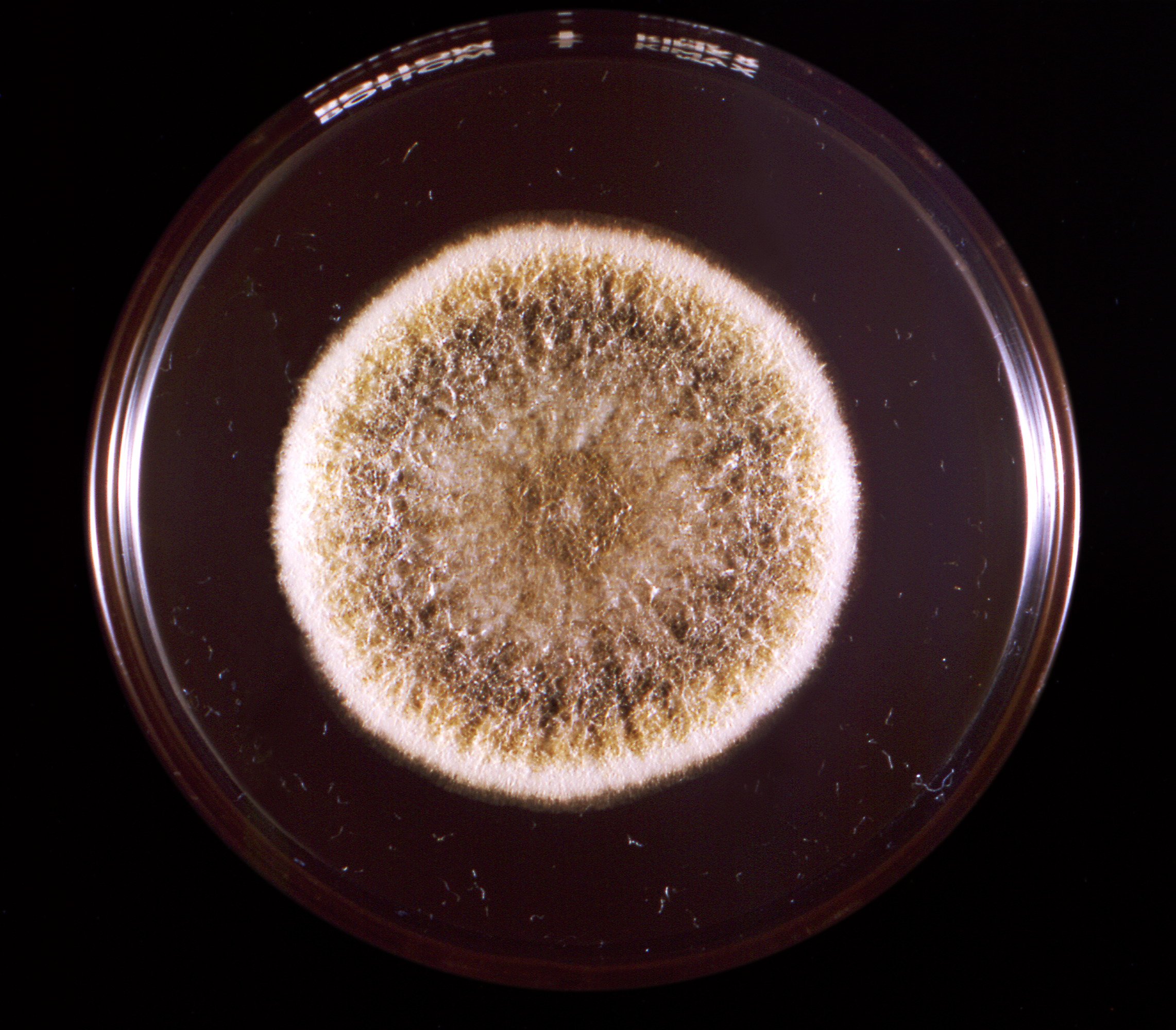
A colony of Aspergillus flavus, the deadly fungus found in the tomb

From 1972 to 1973, the Cathedral authorities undertook work to renovate the Holy Cross chapel. As part of this project, permission was given by the Archbishop of Kraków, Karol Wojtyła – the future Pope John Paul II – to open the tomb of Casimir and Elizabeth in May 1973. The work was undertaken by a team of 12 conservators and their initial aim was to examine the contents of the tomb in order to assess how best to renovate it. When the tomb was opened, the team found rotting wooden coffins and the remains of Casimir and Elizabeth. The restoration work was then carried out and, once it had been completed, Casimir and Elizabeth were re-interred in a ceremony held in the cathedral on 18 September 1973, with Archbishop Wojtyła conducting the service.

In the following months, members of the conservator team began to die prematurely and unexpectedly: Feliks Dańczak died in April 1974, Stefan Walczy in June 1974, Kazimierz Hurlak in August 1974, and Jan Myrlak in May 1975. Other premature deaths soon followed and 10 (Note: Some sources reference 15 rather than 10 deaths; see, for example, J. A. Nungovitch (2018). Gazeta Krakowska, in a 2014 article, refers to the 15 deaths taking place over an extended period of 10 years.) of the 12-man team died prematurely. The global media made comparisons with the supposed curse linked to the premature deaths of those involved in the discovery of the tomb of Tutankhamun in 1922, and rumours of a "Jagiellonian curse" began to circulate. The global notoriety of the story was boosted by the election of Archbishop Wojtyła as Pope in 1978, as his officiation at Casimir's re-interment was one of the few "background" film clips of the new Pope available to the international media.

However, microbiologist Bolesław Smyk identified the presence of the fungus Aspergillus flavus in samples taken from the tomb. This type of fungus produces toxic substances called aflatoxins which are linked to a number of serious health conditions affecting the liver and are highly carcinogenic. Media reports have suggested that the likely cause of the deaths were the aflatoxins produced by this fungus. The Times reported that it is thought that the conservator team members had inhaled the toxic spores of the fungus as they opened the tomb.

== Cultural depictions ==
The Black Spider, a 1985 opera by British composer Judith Weir, includes as one of its stories the opening of Casimir's tomb in 1973 and the subsequent deaths.

Kraków journalist Zbigniew Święch published a book in 1989 telling the story of the opening of Casimir's tomb and the investigation into the subsequent deaths. Curses, Microbes and Scholars (Polish: Klątwy, mikroby i uczeni), which Święch dedicated to the victims of the "Jagiellonian curse", became a best-seller.

== Bibliography ==
- Boyes, Roger (25 February 2010). "Researchers hold breath as they lift lid on history in quest for Archbishop Wichmann". The Times.
- Chipps Smith, Jeffrey (2006). "Stoss, Veit". In Emmerson, Richard Kenneth (ed.). Key Figures in Medieval Europe: An Encyclopedia. Routledge. ISBN 978-0-415-97385-4.
- Davies, Norman (1996). Europe: A History. Oxford University Press. ISBN 978-0-06-097468-8.
- Duczmal, Małgorzata (2012). Jogailaičiai (in Lithuanian). Translated by Mikalonienė, Birutė; Jarutis, Vyturys. MELC. ISBN 978-5-420-01703-6.
- Evans, Rian (29 May 2022). "The Black Spider review – Weir's opera is ghastly gothic treat". The Guardian.
- Frost, Robert (2018). The Making of the Polish–Lithuanian Union 1385–1569. Vol. 1. Oxford University Press. ISBN 978-0-19-256814-4.
- Gazeta Krakowska staff (19 May 2014). "Gdy otwarto grób królewski, zaczęła działać klątwa Jagiellończyka" [When the royal tomb was opened, the curse of the Jagiellonian began its work]. Gazeta Krakowska (in Polish).
- Jones, Barry (2018). Dictionary of World Biography. Australian National University Press. ISBN 978-1-76046-218-5.
- Marchant, Jo (2013). The Shadow King. Da Capo Press. ISBN 978-0-306-82134-9.
- Natkaniec, Alicja (13 September 2007). "Harmful fungi or exaggerated gossip?". The Krakow Post.
- Nungovitch, Petro Andreas (2018). Here All Is Poland: A Pantheonic History of Wawel, 1787–2010. Lexington Books. ISBN 978-1-4985-6913-2.
- Tirmenstein, Mark A.; Mangipudy, Raja (2014). "Aflatoxin". In Wexler, Philip (ed.). Encyclopedia of Toxicology (3rd ed.). Elsevier. ISBN 978-0-12-386455-0.
- Walczak, Marek. "Tombstone of King Casimir IV Jagiellon". Wirtulne Muzea Małopolska. Małopolska Institute of Culture.
- Zuffi, Stefano (2005). European Art of the 15th Century. Translated by Phillips, Brian D. Getty Publications. ISBN 978-0-89236-831-0.
