= David Thaxton =

British musical theatre actor (born 1982)

- Born: 12 May 1982 (age 44); Neath, Neath Port Talbot, Wales
- Education: Royal Welsh College of Music & Drama
- Occupations: Actor, singer
- Known for: Passion, Les Misérables, Sunset Boulevard
- Awards: Laurence Olivier Award for Best Actor in a Musical (2011)

David Thaxton (born 12 May 1982) is a Welsh singer, actor and musical theatre and opera performer. He starred in the Donmar Warehouse's Passion, for which he won the 2011 Laurence Olivier Award for Best Actor in a Leading Role in a Musical.

His West End credits include playing Enjolras and Javert in Les Misérables, The Phantom in The Phantom of the Opera, Kevin T in Come from Away, and Raoul de Chagny in Love Never Dies. In 2023, he starred as Max von Mayerling in the West End revival of Sunset Boulevard and reprised the role for his Broadway debut in 2024. He was nominated for a second Olivier Award for his performance. He returned to the West End in the summer of 2026 as Pontius Pilate in Jesus Christ Superstar.

== Early life and education ==
Thaxton was born in Neath, South Wales. He attended Grimston Primary School and Springwood High School in King's Lynn, Norfolk, and subsequently won a scholarship to the Royal Welsh College of Music and Drama, following a four-year vocal studies course, where he was awarded Young Welsh Musical Theatre Singer of the Year 2005 and was runner-up in the Kathleen Ferrier Young Singers' Bursary. He was also a member of Only Men Aloud!.

== Career ==
As a member of the National Youth Music Theatre, he was part of the world premiere of Richard Taylor's Warchild. He was a soloist at the opening gala for the Wales Millennium Centre in 2004 and created the role of the Wolf in the world premiere of John Doyle's The Tailors Daughter (Welsh National Youth Opera). Other work includes Foreman in Trial by Jury, and the subsequent Chandos recording (BBC National Orchestra of Wales, St David's Hall), Nick Shadow in The Rake's Progress (Wales Millennium Centre), Sweeney in Sweeney Todd (Norwich Playhouse), Harasta in The Cunning Little Vixen (Cardiff Sherman) and Tarquinius in The Rape of Lucretia.

=== Les Misérables ===
From 2005 to 2007, Thaxton was an ensemble member in the London production of Les Misérables at the Queen's Theatre, playing the parts of Courfeyrac and Bamatabois, and understudying the roles of Enjolras and the Bishop of Digne (both first cover). He was part of the 21st Anniversary Cast, performing at the special BBC Radio 2 concert.

In 2008, he returned to Les Misérables, now as principal Enjolras. After the cast change in June 2009, he stayed on for the 2009–2010 season as well. He left the show on 19 June 2010, having played the role to much acclaim and attention from the public.

Thaxton played the role of Javert in the 2014–2015 West End production and reprised the role in 2018.

As of September 27th 2022, Thaxton has once again returned to the role of Javert at the Sondheim Theatre in London's West End, opposite Jon Robyns as Jean Valjean. He left the show in March 2023.

=== Passion, Love Never Dies, and Candide ===
In March 2010, Thaxton accepted the offer to play the part of Giorgio in the Donmar Warehouse revival of the Sondheim/Lapine musical Passion alongside Elena Roger and Scarlett Strallen, with previews starting on 10 September 2010 and opening night on 21 September 2010. He won the Olivier Award for Best Actor in a Musical. Sondheim praised his performance for bringing the show "properly into focus" and making Giorgio the center of attention.

Thaxton portrayed Raoul, Vicomte de Chagny in the second cast of Love Never Dies, taking over from Joseph Millson who portrayed Raoul in the original cast. He played this role at the Adelphi Theatre until it closed on 27 August 2011.

From 23 November to 22 February 2013, Thaxton portrayed Maximilian in Candide at the Menier Chocolate Factory, alongside Fra Fee and Scarlett Strallen.

=== Unborn Twin ===
Thaxton is a member of the band Unborn Twin (formerly Glasgow Coma Score). On 12 January 2012, they announced that they would be issuing their first EP (Distort and Merge EP) and on 12 April of the same year would play a concert at London's Bush Hall. Following on from this the band released the CD and download single "Suffer This", and have played several shows at venues such as Norwich Arts Centre, 93 Feet East and the Dublin Castle in Camden.

=== The Phantom of the Opera, Sunset Boulevard, and further success ===
In October 2018, Thaxton played King Arthur in the London Musical Theatre Orchestra production of Camelot at the London Palladium. He starred opposite Savannah Stevenson and Charles Rice as Guenevere and Lancelot.

From December 2018 to May 2019, Thaxton played a limited engagement as The Phantom in Andrew Lloyd Webber's The Phantom of the Opera filling in for Tim Howar in the West End.

In September 2019, he joined the West End cast of Come from Away as Kevin T, Garth and others.

In 2023, he played Max von Mayerling in a West End revival of Sunset Boulevard. He made his Broadway debut when the production transferred in 2024. He played his final performance in the role on 8 June 2025 and was replaced by Jordan Donica.

== Theatre credits ==
List of David Thaxton theatre credits
| Year | Title | Role | Theatre | Location |
|---|---|---|---|---|
| 2004 | The Tailors Daughter | Wolf | Welsh National Youth Opera | Cardiff |
| 2004 | Sweeney Todd: The Demon Barber of Fleet Street | Sweeney Todd | Norwich Playhouse | Norwich |
| 2005 | Trial By Jury | Foreman | St David's Hall | Cardiff |
| 2005–2007 | Les Misérables | Courfeyrac / Bamatabois / Ensemble u/s Enjolras u/s The Bishop of Digne | Queen's Theatre | West End |
| 2008–2010 | Les Misérables | Enjolras | Queen's Theatre | West End |
| 2010 | Passion | Giorgio Bachetti | Donmar Warehouse | Off-West End |
| 2011 | Love Never Dies | Raoul, Vicomte de Chagny | Adelphi Theatre | West End |
| 2013 | Candide | Maximillian | Menier Chocolate Factory | Off-West End |
| 2014–2015 | Les Misérables | Inspector Javert | Queen's Theatre | West End |
| 2015 | The Olivier's in Concert | Himself | BBC Concert Orchestra | London |
| 2016 | Jesus Christ Superstar | Pontius Pilate | Regent's Park Open Air Theatre | London |
| 2017 | Jesus Christ Superstar | Pontius Pilate | Regent's Park Open Air Theatre | London |
| 2018 | Les Misérables | Inspector Javert | Queen's Theatre | West End |
| 2018 | Camelot | King Arthur | London Palladium | West End |
| 2018–2019 | The Phantom of The Opera | The Phantom of the Opera | Her Majesty's Theatre | West End |
| 2019–2020 | Come from Away | Kevin T, Garth & Others | Phoenix Theatre | West End |
| 2020 | Jesus Christ Superstar | Pontius Pilate | Regent's Park Open Air Theatre | London |
| 2021 | The Sorcerer's Apprentice | Johan Gottel | Southwark Playhouse | Off-West End |
| 2021-2022 | She Loves Me | Georg Nowack | Crucible Theatre | Sheffield |
| 2022-2023 | Les Misérables | Inspector Javert | Sondheim Theatre | West End |
| 2023-2024 | Sunset Boulevard | Max von Mayerling | Savoy Theatre | West End |
| 2024-2025 | Sunset Boulevard | Max von Mayerling | St. James Theatre | Broadway |
| 2025 | Roam | Philippe | Shaftesbury Theatre | West End |
| 2026 | Jesus Christ Superstar | Pontius Pilate | London Palladium | West End |
| 2026–2027 | Jesus Christ Superstar | Pontius Pilate | Theatre Royal, Drury Lane | West End |

== Accolades ==
| Year | Award | Category | Work | Result |
|---|---|---|---|---|
| 2011 | Laurence Olivier Awards | Best Actor in a Leading Role in a Musical | Passion | Won |
| 2024 | Laurence Olivier Awards | Best Actor in a Supporting Role in a Musical | Sunset Boulevard | Nominated |

== See also ==
- List of British actors
