= Oboe Concerto (Weir) =

2018 oboe concerto by Judith Weir

Judith Weir's Oboe Concerto was written from 2016 to 2018 on a joint commission from the Adelaide Symphony Orchestra, the Tasmanian Symphony Orchestra, and the West Australian Symphony Orchestra. Its world premiere was performed by the oboist Celia Craig (to whom the score is dedicated) and the Adelaide Symphony Orchestra conducted by Douglas Boyd at Adelaide Town Hall, Adelaide, on 12 October 2018.

== Composition ==
The concerto lasts about 18 minutes and is divided in two numbered movements. Weir, who began playing the oboe at the age of 11, described writing the piece as having "an almost autobiographical significance." She added, "It was also a memory exercise, as I recalled in detail some of the music I had learned so carefully during those years. One important work, the Strauss Concerto, was helpful with my choice of accompanying instruments; just a wind octet plus strings." She also cited Domenico Cimarosa's "Concerto for Oboe" as having influenced "the melancholy but also dance-like feel" of the second movement.

=== Instrumentation ===
The work is scored for solo oboe and a small orchestra comprising two flutes, two clarinets, two bassoons, two horns, and strings.

== Reception ==
The concerto has been generally praised by music critics. Rebecca Franks of The Times wrote, "The solo line strolls in as if it had just turned a corner to join us; it later simply disappears like a bird flying high up into the sky. The work finishes as unassumingly as it starts: three oboe calls followed by three string chords that fade into the distance. The effect was understated, refreshing." Hannah Nepilova of the Financial Times similarly opined that "this piece confirms Weir's integrity: she writes what she wants to write, impervious to the criticisms of those who might disdain tonality. There is much sophisticated lyricism in this concerto, and real feeling." She nevertheless added, "But the nostalgia runs away with itself: between echoes of early Vaughan Williams and Richard Strauss, there's precious little space left for Weir's own voice."
