= Kent Opera =

Opera company in Ashford, England (1969–1989)

- Opera company
- Founded: 1969, by Norman Platt
- Disbanded: 1989
- Location: Ashford, Kent, England
- Music director: Roger Norrington (1969–1984); Iván Fischer (1984–1989)
- Website: kentopera.org

Kent Opera was a British opera company active between 1969 and 1989. It was based in Ashford and regular venues included The Orchard Theatre, Dartford; Assembly Halls, Tunbridge Wells; Marlowe Theatre, Canterbury; Kings Theatre, Southsea; Theatre Royal, Norwich; and the Derngate, Northampton. Its operas were performed in English, usually with new translations of the libretto by professor Michael Irwin, but also by Norman Platt or Anne Riddler. For the first two years it performed with the Midland Sinfonia but later had its own orchestra.

== History ==
Kent Opera was England's first regional opera company, founded in 1969 by Norman Platt (1920–2004), in response to a perceived need for first-class opera in England outside the main centres, in productions that were composer-centred. The founding music director of Kent Opera was Roger Norrington (1969–1984). He was succeeded by Iván Fischer (1984–1989). Chorus masters during its existence were Jonathan Hinden, Timothy Dean and Mark Tatlow.

Kent Opera gave its inaugural performances in 1969 with Claudio Monteverdi's The Coronation of Poppea, sung in English at Canterbury and Tunbridge Wells with Adrian de Peyer, a high tenor, as Nero and Laura Sarti as Poppea. The edition chosen by the conductor, Roger Norrington, was that by Raymond Leppard, but in 1974, when the company was invited to Lisbon, Norrington, with the Kent Opera continuo players, produced a realisation closer to Monteverdi's manuscripts. Anne Pashley and Sandra Browne were now the lovers, Laura Sarti sang Ottavia and John Tomlinson Seneca. Later that year the production toured Kent and was seen at the City of London Festival: "It comes closer to the heart of this blazing masterpiece than any other I have heard", wrote the Sunday Telegraph. The following year, in a new translation by Platt, the opera was performed at the Proms, with Sarah Walker as Poppea. In 1986, Kent Opera toured a new production of Poppea with Patricia Rozario as Nero and Eirian James as Poppea, and Iván Fischer made his own new realisation of the score.

By 1974, there were usually three operas in the repertory at any time, typically a Baroque opera, a Mozart opera and a 19th- or 20th-century work. Wherever possible the company aimed to revive productions with the same team and singers and improve on the original production. The company's performances were broadcast on radio and television. The company was the subject of a series of programmes made by TVS entitled Staging an Opera. Channel 4 broadcast the production of King Priam in 1986 in celebration of Michael Tippett's 80th birthday. Other television programmes were one on Kent Opera including rehearsals of L'Orfeo (Monteverdi) also A Night at the Chinese Opera (Weir).

Kent Opera did considerable work with children and in developing new audiences. This included commissioning children's operas from Alan Ridout, Adrian Cruft, Judith Weir, Christopher Brown and Ruth Byrchmore. Summer concerts from 1971 were presented in venues around the south east of England.

The company appeared at major British festivals: Edinburgh (1979), the City of London, Aldeburgh and Bath; as well as in Lisbon and Porto (1974), Venice (1980), Schwetzingen (1976) and Singapore. It was the first British company to appear at the Vienna Festival in June 1986 at the Theater an der Wien. It presented The Coronation of Poppea at the Proms in 1975.

The company received critical acclaim for the clarity and imagination of its productions, of which Norman Platt directed 17; Jonathan Miller directed his first opera at Kent Opera in 1974 (Così fan tutte) and returned to direct six further operas. Other guest directors included Adrian Slack, Elijah Moshinsky, Nicholas Hytner (his first opera direction), Christopher Bruce, Adrian Noble, and Richard Jones.

== Repertory ==
The company performed a wide range of operas from the entire history of the genre:

- The Coronation of Poppea (Monteverdi) (1969, 1974, 1986)
- Atalanta (Handel) (1970)
- The Marriage of Figaro (Mozart) (1970, 1981–82, 1984–86)
- Dido and Aeneas (Purcell) (1971, 1986–87)
- Venus and Adonis (Blow) (1972, 1976, 1980–81)
- Don Giovanni (Mozart) (1972, 1983, 1988)
- H.M.S. Pinafore (Sullivan) (1973)
- The Patience of Socrates (Telemann) (1974, British première)
- Così fan tutte (Mozart) (1974, 1981)
- Ruddigore (Sullivan) (1975)
- Rigoletto (Verdi) (1975)
- The Magic Flute (Mozart) (1976, 1980, 1987)
- Orfeo (Monteverdi) (1976, 1997)
- Eugene Onegin (Tchaikovsky) (1977, 1981–82)
- Iphigenia in Tauris (Gluck) (1977)
- Die Entführung aus dem Serail (Mozart) (1978, 1984)
- The Return of Ulysses (Monteverdi) (1978, 1989)
- Idomeneo (Mozart) (1979)
- La Traviata (Verdi) (1979–80, 1985–86)
- The Turn of the Screw (Britten) (1979–80)
- Il ballo delle ingrate (Monteverdi) (1980–81)
- Falstaff (Verdi) (1980–81, 1983–84)
- Il Combattimento di Tancredi e Clorinda (Monteverdi) (1981)
- Aggripina (Handel) (1981, 1985)
- The Beggar's Opera (arr Britten) (1982–83)
- Fidelio (Beethoven) (1982–83, 1988)
- Robinson Crusoé (Offenbach) (1983–84)
- King Priam (Tippett) (1984–85)
- The Barber of Seville (Rossini) (1985)
- Pigmalion (Rameau) (1986–87)
- Carmen (Bizet) (1986–87)
- Il Re Pastore (Mozart) (1987)
- Le Comte Ory (Rossini) (1988)
- Peter Grimes (Britten) (1989)
- The Burning Fiery Furnace (Britten) (1989)
- The Prodigal Son (Britten) (1994)
- The Masque in Dioclesian (Purcell) (1995)
- Orfeo (Monteverdi)

In addition, the company gave world premieres of the following operas: The Pardoner's Tale by Alan Ridout (1971), The Black Spider by Judith Weir (1985), A Night at the Chinese Opera by Judith Weir (1987), and Dr Syn by Adrian Cruft (1984).

== Closure ==
The effective closure of Kent Opera in 1989, due to the withdrawal of all funding from the Arts Council, was a controversial decision which generated protest. In 1983, Kent Opera was the only opera company not to have its deficit written off. An Arts Council report in 1987 threatened to withdraw Kent Opera's grant from 1 April 1988 but this was successfully fought off, partly because the report contained much false information. In 1988, the company made successful tours to Singapore and Valencia in Spain, and with its 20th anniversary approaching, received plaudits in the press. When another proposal to cut the company was put forward in December 1989, Robert Ponsonby resigned from the music panel, performances at Covent Garden were cancelled and commissions from Michael Berkeley and Peter Maxwell Davies stopped.

Three further small-scale productions were mounted between 1994 and 1997.
