= Welsh National Youth Opera =

WNO Youth Opera (WNYO) (Welsh: Opera Ieuenctid WNO) is a training and performance programme for young singers aged between 8 and 25. It forms part of the youth wing of Welsh National Opera, with Youth Opera groups in South Wales (Cardiff), North Wales (Llandudno) and Birmingham. Recent full-scale WNO Youth Opera productions include Brundibár (2019), Kommilitonen! (2016), and Paul Bunyan (2013).

The groups meets regularly in throughout the academic year with and work with directors, vocal coaches and musicians to improve performance skills, as well as collaborating with composers and writers in the creation of new pieces.

== Background ==
Formerly known as WNO Singing Club and starting with only seven participants, it has grown to include over a hundred members spanning over three regional hubs (South Wales, North Wales and Birmingham).

Each year WNO Youth Opera mounts a full-scale production which is performed in the Wales Millennium Centre. In April 2005 it premièred the thrilling new opera The Tailor's Daughter composed by Brian Irvine with a libretto by Greg Cullen and directed by John Doyle. In July 2006 it performed Leonard Bernstein's comic operetta Candide to much acclaim ), while in July 2009 the company performed Stephen Sondheim's Sweeney Todd. There were more performances in 2022 (Judith Weir’s The Black Spider), 2024 (The Very Last Green Thing) and 2025 (Panig, Attack!).

Upcoming productions in 2022 include Judith Weir's The Black Spider and Shostakovich's Moscow, Cheryomushki.

Upcoming productions in 2026 include The Odyssey.

== Notable alumni ==
Previous members currently working in opera and music theatre include Natalya Romaniw, Samantha Price and David Thaxton.
