= Begin Afresh =

Orchestral work by Judith Weir

Begin Afresh is an orchestral composition written in 2022 by the British composer Judith Weir. The work was commissioned by BBC Radio 3 and was given its premiere by the BBC Symphony Orchestra conducted by Sakari Oramo as part of the BBC Proms at the Royal Albert Hall, London, on 24 August 2023. The piece is dedicated to the BBC Symphony Orchestra.

== Composition ==
Begin Afresh has a duration of about 17 minutes and is cast in three movements:

1. April
2. October
3. February

=== Background ===
In the score program note, Weir described the piece as "a kind of diary, an almost continuous survey of musical reflections about the trees and plants I observed, in a very urban setting, over the period of a year." The title of the work comes from the final line of Philip Larkin's poem "The Trees." During the course of its completion, Weir had also taken two breaks from composing and thus named the movements after each month she started or restarted work on the piece.

=== Instrumentation ===
The work is scored for an orchestra consisting of three flutes (3rd doubling piccolo), two oboes, cor anglais, two clarinets, bass clarinet, two bassoons, contrabassoon, four horns, three trumpets, two trombones, bass trombone tuba, timpani, two percussionists, piano, and strings.

== Reception ==
Reviewing the world premiere, Martin Kettle of The Guardian gave Begin Afresh a positive review, remarking, "Though trees themselves are necessarily static, Weir's three-movement score is anything but. It ripples sinuously in the spring, with almost a concertante role for lead violin Igor Yuzefovich, pulses mysteriously in the autumn, and is full of mostly quiet activity even in midwinter." He added, "Begin Afresh, a title drawn from Philip Larkin, is delicately scored and its ideas are always evolving in a recognisably traditional way. It even gets a bit Tolkienesque at times, with piano and brass conjuring passages that sounded distinctly like music for ents. Oramo and his players did it all proud."
