= Like as the hart (Weir) =

2022 choral composition by Judith Weir

- Choral composition by Judith Weir
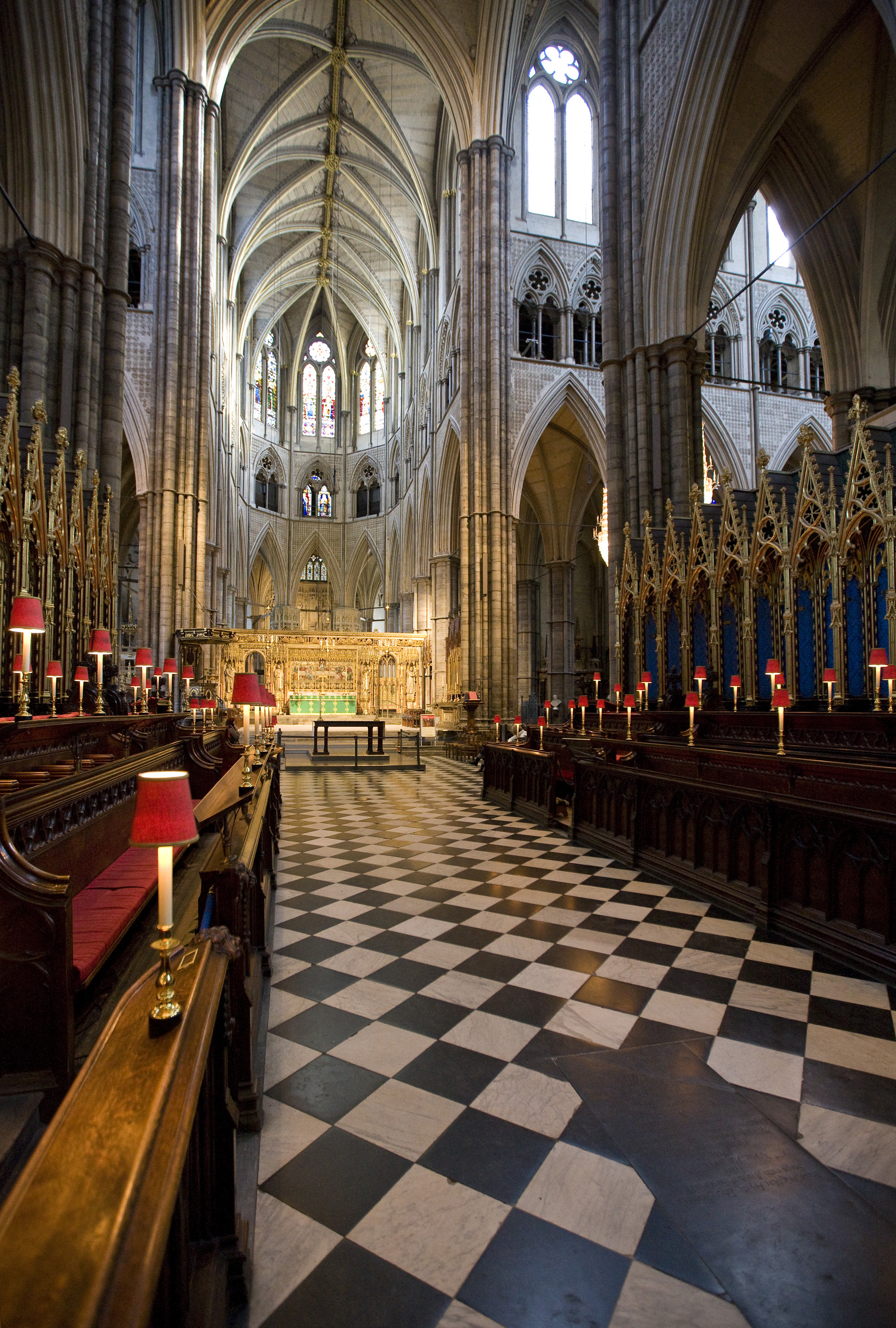
- Interior of Westminster Abbey
- Occasion: State funeral of Elizabeth II
- Text: Psalm 42:1–7 (Book of Common Prayer)
- Language: English
- Performed: 19 September 2022: Westminster Abbey
- Scoring: SATB choir

"Like as the hart" is a composition for unaccompanied choir by the British composer Judith Weir, setting the first seven verses of Psalm 42 from the Book of Common Prayer. It was commissioned for the state funeral of Queen Elizabeth II, at which it was first performed by choirs conducted by James O'Donnell at Westminster Abbey on 19 September 2022.

== History ==
Weir, who was appointed the first female Master of the Queen's Music in 2014, recalled that her compositions for royal occasions, such as the service of thanksgiving for the Platinum Jubilee of Queen Elizabeth II in June 2022 at St Paul's Cathedral, were "always graciously, and often personally, acknowledged by The Queen". As Master of the King's Music, Weir was commissioned to compose "Like as the hart" for Elizabeth's state funeral, which took place on 19 September 2022 at Westminster Abbey. It is a three-minute a cappella setting of the first seven verses of Psalm 42 as used in the Book of Common Prayer. The work was published by Chester Music.

The piece, inspired by Her Majesty's unwavering Christian faith, is a setting of Psalm 42 to music and will be sung unaccompanied.

— Buckingham Palace, 18 September 2022

"Like as the hart" was first performed during the funeral by the combined choirs of Westminster Abbey and the Chapel Royal, St James's Palace, conducted by James O'Donnell, the Abbey's organist and master of the choristers.

== Text and theme ==
The first seven verses of Psalm 42 read in the BCP:

1. Like as the hart desireth the water-brooks: so longeth my soul after thee, O God.
2. My soul is athirst for God, yea, even for the living God : when shall I come to appear before the presence of God?
3. My tears have been my meat day and night: while they daily say unto me, Where is now thy God?
4. Now when I think thereupon, I pour out my heart by myself: for I went with the multitude, and brought them forth into the house of God;
5. In the voice of praise and thanksgiving: among such as keep holy-day.
6. Why art thou so full of heaviness, O my soul : and why art thou so disquieted within me?
7. Put thy trust in God: for I will yet give him thanks for the help of his countenance.

Weir commented about the text and her composition: "The words and music speak at first of the soul's great sadness and thirst for God's reassurance; but as the psalm progresses, the mood becomes calmer and more resolved, culminating in consolation, with the words 'Put thy trust in God'". She said that she was inspired by the Queen's strong faith in Anglican worship, and her support for it.

== Reception ==
Tim Ashley from The Guardian wrote: "Weir's psalm is astonishingly beautiful, as slowly shifting chords and harmonies suggest the soul's longing for God in the contemplation of eternity."
