= The Black Spider =

1842 novella by the Swiss writer Jeremias Gotthelf

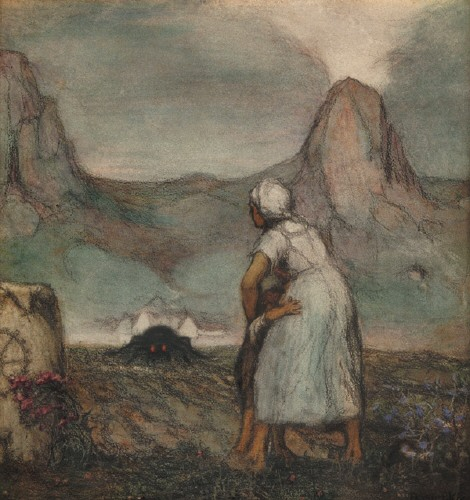
- 'The Black Spider' by Franz Karl Basler-Kopp
- Author: Jeremias Gotthelf
- Original title: Die Schwarze Spinne
- Translator: HM Waidson (1958); JT Hughes (2010); Susan Bernofsky (2013)
- Language: German
- Genre: Allegory, horror, Biedermeier
- Published: 1842
- Publication place: Switzerland

The Black Spider is a novella by the Swiss writer Jeremias Gotthelf written in 1842. Set in an idyllic frame story, old legends are worked into a Christian-humanist allegory about ideas of good and evil. Though the novel is initially divided, what is originally the internal story later spills over into the frame story as well. The story is characterized by its complex narrative structure, its conservative Christian motifs and symbolism and its precise descriptions of the social dynamics of the village.

== Plot ==
The novella begins with a christening party at a farm, during the course of which a few of the guests in front of the house go for a walk. It catches the godmother's eye that although the house is newly built, an old black post is built into it. At her inquiry, the grandfather tells everyone the story of the post.

=== First internal narrative ===
The grandfather tells how a few centuries before, the village had been ruled by a Teutonic Knight named Hans von Stoffeln, who worked the farmers of the village very hard. Von Stoffeln, a strict and aggressive man, relentlessly collected on the tax obligations of his serfs. His unpredictability inspired fear among the peasants, and he would brook no contradiction; any criticism towards Von Stoffeln's rule inspired such harsh retaliation that the farmers submitted meekly to his will. Von Stoffeln demanded ever more ludicrous tasks, the last of which was the replanting of trees from a distant mountain to form a shaded path on his estate. He demanded this job be done in such a short period that the peasants could never complete it without abandoning their own harvest and going hungry.

At this dire moment, the Devil, in the form of a wild hunter, offered his assistance with the replanting. As payment, he wanted an unbaptized child. At first, the peasants refused his offer. However, Christine, a farmer's wife who had come to the valley from Lindau near Lake Constance, was against the mistreatment of the villagers and wanted an end to all the outrageous demands being enforced by von Stoffeln. After the initial refusal, everything began to go wrong with their project. Finally, Christine convinced the farmers to accept the bargain, believing that they could escape it by baptizing every child immediately at birth. The Devil's pact was sealed when the hunter gave Christine a kiss on her cheek. The hunter used his demonic powers to instill a curse in the kiss, which would ensure his payment.

The task of moving the trees suddenly became very easy and was quickly completed. When the first child was born, the pastor saved her by baptizing the girl immediately afterwards. However, Christine soon felt a burning pain on her cheek, exactly where the hunter had kissed her. A black mark appeared on her face, which grew into the shape of a black spider. After the second child was baptized, a storm blew in and a swarm of tiny venomous spiders emerged from the enchanted mark on Christine's face, spreading across the village and slaying the cattle in their stalls. Thus, the Devil reminded everyone of his contract.

Christine and the villagers decided on sacrificing a third newborn, and the plague on their cattle ceased. On the day of the birth, Christine tried to steal the infant so she could give him to the devil, but the priest drove him away with a prayer. Sprinkled with holy water, Christine was transformed into a demonic spider and killed the priest before fleeing from her village. She began to terrorize the valley, killing both villagers and animals, including von Stoffeln and his entire retinue. One night, the mother of one of Christine's victims captured the spider, shoved it into a hole in a window post she had prepared, and plugged the hole up. The woman died upon touching the spider, but peace returned to the valley.

After the grandfather finished his story, the guests, now afraid of the house, reluctantly return to the dining room. The grandfather therefore feels obligated to finish the story:

=== Second internal narrative ===
In the following years, the valley's citizens continued their lives with a newfound respect towards God. However, in time many turned to godless behavior. Finally, a malicious farmhand released the spider, which killed almost everyone in the village. At the next birth, Christen, the master of the farmhand who released the spider, rescued the child from the Devil's clutches, captured the spider, and returned it to its old prison. He paid for this service with his life, but he died in "God's peace". Once again, peace and respect towards God continued within the valley. Although the farmhouse was rebuilt several times, the post was always put back in so the villagers can preserve their old blessing. When the latest house was built, the grandfather integrated the old window post into it.

The grandfather ends his story on that note, and the christening celebration continues jovially until later that night. The novella ends with a hint that God is watching over everything.

== Reception and criticism ==
The Black Spider is Gotthelf's best known work. At first little noticed, the story is now considered by many critics to be among the masterworks of the German Biedermeier era and sensibility. Thomas Mann wrote of it in his The Genesis of Doctor Faustus that Gotthelf "often touched the Homeric" and that he admired The Black Spider "like no other piece of world literature."

The Black Spider is, in many ways, a precursor to the weird fiction of twentieth-century writers such as Lord Dunsany, Clark Ashton Smith, and H.P. Lovecraft and "may very well be one of the first works of weird fiction ever written."

In a review for the New York Times, Terrence Rafferty wrote: "[Gotthelf] does something only the best horror writers, and the best preachers, can do: he puts the fear of God in you."

The novella's depictions of a town led astray in difficult times by a headstrong leader and the morality of collective guilt gave it renewed relevance in the post-World War II era. Scholars and critics have also focused on the gender norms that emerge from the story. Christine's role as the headstrong and independent woman leads to the first introduction of the spider and her eventual transformation into a monster. The mother of a child then manages to capture the spider, at the cost of her life. Then the malicious, godless farmhand releases it. Finally Christen (who is browbeaten by his overbearing wife and mother) captures the beast again, and dies from its bite.

== Legacy ==
The Swiss composer Heinrich Sutermeister wrote a one act opera based on the story in 1936, which was first performed as a radio opera. In 1949 a staged version was put on conducted by Silvio Varviso. In 1954, John Lewis Opera gave the first stage performances of the opera in England at Peter Jones in Sloane Square. The first film adaptation was released in 1921 as a silent film; then in 1983, Swiss director Mark Rissi directed a film based on the novel, but with a modern story frame. The story was also the basis for a 1983 opera by Judith Weir.

== Editions ==
The novella has been translated into English in a number of versions and numerous other languages. This is not a complete list.

- The Black Spider, John Calder. Trans. H. M. Waidson (1958)
- The Black Spider in Nineteenth Century German Tales, Anchor Books (1959)
- The Black Spider in German Novellas of Realism, The German Library. Trans. H. M. Waidson
- The Black Spider, University Press of America. Trans. Jolyon Timothy Hughes (2010)
- The Black Spider, New York Review Books Classics. Trans. Susan Bernofsky (2013)
