= The Consolations of Scholarship =

Opera by Judith Weir

- Opera by Judith Weir
- Librettist: Weir
- Language: English
- Based on: Chi Chun-hsiang's The Orphan of Chao
- Premiere: 5 May 1985; University of Durham

The Consolations of Scholarship is an opera by Judith Weir with a libretto by the composer. The Consolations of Scholarship is based closely on the Yuan dramas The Orphan of Chao (by Chi Chun-hsiang) and the anonymous A Stratagem of Interlocking Rings.

Described as a 'music drama' for soprano and nine instruments, "a Yuan dynasty tale unfolds (this piece is the embryo for A Night at the Chinese Opera with which it shares both narrative and musical material) through plain narration and philosophical discourse".

The work was composed for the Lontano Ensemble; the premiere took place at University of Durham in 1985 with Linda Hirst, mezzo-soprano, and Lontano directed by Odaline de la Martinez.

== Performance history ==
The opera was first performed at the University of Durham on 5 May 1985 with Hirst and Lontano, and recorded by them at St Luke's Hampstead in 1989, issued on United 88040.

== Synopsis ==
Place: China
Time: 13th / 14th century

A traveller describes the Kingdom of Tsin and the ruthless General K'an. The latter has only one adversary, a good government official Chao Tun. Chao Tun is accused of plotting against the Emperor by K'an and sent a false letter telling him to kill himself. Before he does so he gets his wife and their new-born son to flee.

The son, who has been raised in an enlightened way by a remote hermit, goes to the capital city twenty years later as a young man to study philosophical classics. In the library he deciphers passages in texts which reveal the true story of his father's death.

A heavenly being, attempting to stop a plot against the Emperor by K'an casts a scroll at the General's feet, who, unable to understand the words, looks for someone to help read it, and meets the boy leaving the library. Reading and realizing the plot, the son gives a different translation then rushes to warn the Emperor of the attack. The Emperor thanks the son by returning to him his father's property.
