= Miss Fortune (opera) =

Miss Fortune is an opera by Judith Weir based on a Sicilian fable.

On 21 July 2011, Miss Fortune premiered at the Bregenz Festival in Austria as Miss Fortune (Achterbahn). It was a co-production with the Royal Opera, Covent Garden, London, and was written in English.

The opera reworks a Sicilian folktale as a contemporary parable. Gerhard R. Koch, writing in the Frankfurter Allgemeine newspaper on 25 July, had these observations:

The music of Judith Weir, who also wrote the libretto for her opera, is neither avant-garde nor experimental but has a highly distilled folkloric style with cantabile voices similar to that of Britten without becoming retrospective. Tonality and atonality are not applied in a strictly antithetical manner, therefore the ideas of the American minimalists Reich and Riley are very present. This music has colour and a rhythmic pulse; it creates characteristic sounds without losing itself in descriptive patterns.

Miss Fortune moved to London in March 2012, garnering at least two negative reviews. Edward Seckerson in The Independent wrote of "Miss Fortune in name and deed" and described the opera as "silly and naive" and "a waste of talent and resources", with a libretto that "vacillates between the banal and the unintentionally comedic (or is that irony?), full of truisms and clunky metaphors" and "about as streetwise as a visitor from Venus". Andrew Clements wrote in The Guardian of "a long two hours in the opera house" with scenes that "follow like cartoonish tableaux, without real characterisation, or confrontation, and without suggesting a dramatic shape", and also criticised the "twee rhyming couplets and inert blank verse" of Weir's libretto.

The American premiere of Miss Fortune was originally planned in 2011 by the Santa Fe Opera to be a part of its 2014 season, but it was announced in the summer of 2012 that the opera was to be replaced by the North American premiere of Huang Ruo's Dr. Sun Yat-sen.
