= The welcome arrival of rain =

Orchestral work by Judith Weir

The welcome arrival of rain is an orchestral composition written between 2001 and 2002 by the British composer Judith Weir. It was commissioned for the centennial celebration of the Minnesota Orchestra, which first performed the piece under the conductor Osmo Vänskä on 22 January 2003.

== Composition ==
The welcome arrival of rain is written in a single movement and lasts about 16 minutes. The work's title was inspired by a passage from the Hindu text Bhagavata Purana and the music itself was inspired in part by the annual arrival of the monsoon in India.

=== Instrumentation ===
The work is scored for a large orchestra comprising three flutes (3rd doubling piccolo), two oboes, cor anglais, three clarinets, three bassoons, four horns, four trumpets, timpani, three percussionists (on glockenspiel, rototoms, and tomtoms), harp, and strings.

== Reception ==
Reviewing the United Kingdom premiere by the BBC Symphony Orchestra, Andrew Clements of The Guardian called The welcome arrival of rain "an enchanting piece" and wrote, "the elements of Weir's quarter-hour orchestral evocation seem simple enough—a recurrent Janacek-like brass refrain, a pattering of drums that sets in halfway through and gets more insistent, a pawky trio of bassoons, sky-bound flutes, flaring clarinets—but these ingredients are combined in unexpected ways, through sly orchestral doublings and sleights of pacing." Tom Service, also writing for The Guaridan, later named the piece as one of five key works in the composer's career.

Geoffrey Norris of The Daily Telegraph was slightly more critical of the work, however, observing, "The ending to this piece, in part inspired by a Hindu text about the monsoon, has a sweet freshness to it, but the rest is harder to fathom. As one who normally responds keenly to Weir's music and likes its healthy diversity, I found The Welcome Arrival of Rain slightly disappointing. The mounting energy of which Weir spoke in her programme note did not really materialise." He added, "The music is certainly written with a virtuoso flourish, with plenty of instrumental colour and atmosphere. A firm rhythmic momentum is maintained, but the texture becomes mired in detail and a profusion of material, and somehow loses a sense of structural grip and direction."
