= Piano Concerto (Weir) =

Concerto by Judith Weir

The Piano Concerto is a concerto for piano and string orchestra by the British composer Judith Weir. The work was commissioned by Anthony and Mary Henfrey in celebration of their 25th wedding anniversary. It was written for the pianist William Howard, who first performed the work with the BT Scottish Ensemble at the Spitalfields Festival in London on 12 June 1997.

== Composition ==
In the score program notes, Weir described the soft nature of the Piano Concerto, writing, "Ever since the modern piano was born, the composition of piano concertos has been on an inflationary spiral, and it is now a musical form associated with the crashingly loud side of music; which is not the kind of music I generally like to write." She continued:

But knowing of William's performances of such smale [sic] scale concertos as the Mozart K 449 with as few as five strings in the accompanying orchestra, I was inspired to write him a contemporary piece which similarly lives in the space between chamber music and bravura-filled spectacle. The first performance (given at the 1997 Spitalfields Festival in London) was performed with an orchestra of nine solo strings, led from the keyboard. Subsequent performances have sometimes involved much larger string orchestras, often directed by a conductor. But this doesn’t seem to have altered the essentially intimate character of the music.

=== Structure ===
The concerto has a duration of roughly 15 minutes in performance and is cast in three movements:

- I
- II: "The Sweet Primeroses"
- III

== Reception ==
The Piano Concerto is one of Weir's most celebrated works. Tom Service of The Guardian called it a "pocket-sized compression of a big classical form into just 15 minutes, scored for piano and string ensemble," adding, "Weir somehow manages to create music that sounds completely new from the utterly familiar elements of a held chord in the strings and a melody high up in the piano." Reviewing a recording of the concerto, the music critic Anthony Tommasini of The New York Times similarly remarked, "Ms. Weir's 1997 Piano Concerto, while paying homage to the delicacy of Mozart's smaller-scaled concertos, shows her in her most audacious mode from the start: wispy lyrical lines in the piano are cushioned by pungent chamber orchestra chords, until the piano turns agitated and a rhythmic bout breaks out among all the players." Arnold Whittall of Gramophone described it as "another exercise in puncturing pretension, making strong points about how both lyrical and brittle textures can interact with folk-like idioms in ways where nothing seems diluted or bland."
