= Christopher Ventris =

British tenor (born 1965)

Christopher Ventris, is a British tenor. He is particularly known for his role as Parsifal which he has performed over 100 times including performances at the Bayreuth Festival during the 2008, 2009, and 2010 Festival seasons.

Ventris studied at the Royal Academy of Music, studying with Joy Mammen. He appeared there in the title-role of Orpheus in the Underworld, where one critic, though commenting that "North-country speech and standard pronunciation in song do not go well together in operetta", otherwise found "Ventris was a true-voiced and likeable Orpheus".

After college he joined Glyndebourne Festival Opera winning the GTO Singers and John Christie awards. He went on to sing with other British companies, including Opera North and English National Opera. He sang the part of Robert Lonle in the first performance of Robert Saxton's Caritas and the combined role of Walter, Hugo and the old woman in the first performance of Judith Weir's opera Blond Eckbert. He was the 2007 recipient of the Maria Callas Debut Artist of the Year Award, presented annually by Dallas Opera to the singer who makes the biggest impact on voting patrons in his or her company debut, for the role of Lohengrin.

Ventris' engagements include productions at the Vienna State Opera, the San Francisco Opera, the Royal Opera, London, the Teatro di San Carlo, Naples, La Fenice, Venice, La Scala, Milan, the Glyndebourne Festival, the Grand Théâtre de Genève in Geneva and the Bavarian State Opera.

== Roles ==
Ventris's roles include:

- The title roles in Parsifal, Lohengrin, Tannhäuser and Peter Grimes
- Siegmund in Die Walküre
- Erik in Der fliegende Holländer
- Max in Der Freischütz
- Sergej in Lady Macbeth of Mtsensk
- Laca in Jenůfa
- Janek in The Makropulos Affair
- Florestan in Fidelio
- Manolios in The Greek Passion
- Lensky in Eugene Onegin
- Grigory (the False Dmitriy) in Boris Godunov
- Jenik in The Bartered Bride
- Prince in The Love of Three Oranges
- Jack in The Midsummer Marriage
- Paris in King Priam
- Clemente in Hans Werner Henze's Venus und Adonis
- Officer in Cardillac

== Selected recordings ==
- Wagner: Parsifal (Christopher Ventris, Thomas Hampson, Waltraud Meier, Matti Salminen; Berlin Opera Orchestra and Chorus, conductor: Kent Nagano. (DVD - 2005) Label: BBC / Opus Arte'
- Shostakovich: Lady Macbeth of Mtsensk (Christopher Ventris, Eva-Maria Westbroek, Vladimir Vaneev, Carole Wilson, Ludovit Ludha; Royal Concertgebouw Orchestra, conductor: Mariss Jansons (DVD 2006) Label: BBC / Opus Arte.
- Britten: Peter Grimes (Christopher Ventris, Emily Magee, Liliana Nikiteanu, Alfred Muff; Zurich Opera Orchestra and Chorus, conductor: Franz Welser-Möst (DVD 2007) Label: EMI.
