= Norman Platt =

British singer and opera director (1920–2004)

Norman Platt (1920 − 2004) was a singer and opera director, and artistic director in charge of Kent Opera from its beginnings to its enforced closure in 1989. His singing career covered membership of the Deller Consort and Sadler's Wells Opera, and he also translated opera libretti.

== Life and Career ==
Platt was born in Bury on 29 August 1920 and began piano lessons at six years; by nine he was a paid member of the parish choir in Bury where he later attended the Grammar School. Aged 15 he was taken to Munich and Bayreuth and was overwhelmed by his exposure to Wagner in the theatre. He went to King's College, Cambridge in 1939 and read theology, joining the chapel choir; upon graduation, as a pacifist he became an air-raid warden. At this time he took singing lessons with Elena Gerhardt which led to a job in the chorus of The Tales of Hoffmann at the Strand Theatre and in 1946 he became a principal with Sadler's Wells Opera where his roles included Ned Keene, Schaunard, Monterone and Mizgir. He sang Page in the first professional production of Sir John in Love in 1946. In 1947 he gave a solo recital at Wigmore Hall with Gerald Moore, and later that year played Feste in Twelfth Night in Regent's Park. The same year he joined the St Paul's Cathedral choir where he met Alfred Deller and became a founding member of the Deller Consort.

He translated Boulevard Solitude for its UK premiere at Sadler's Wells Theatre in June 1962 and later Atalanta, Fidelio and Don Giovanni among others.

In 1966 he was the moving spirit behind a new opera company called Regional Opera, which gave its first performance at the Swan Theatre in Worcester that November with a double-bill of Pimpinone and Dido and Aeneas, both produced by Platt and with him singing the title role in the Telemann.

He founded Kent Opera in 1969 and received critical acclaim for the clarity and imagination of its productions, of which Norman Platt directed 17; in total 60 productions were mounted by Kent Opera and toured within the UK and in Europe. He was also noted for helping young directors - such as Jonathan Miller and Nicholas Hytner and singers get started. The effective closure of Kent Opera in 1989 due to the withdrawal of all funding from the Arts Council was a controversial decision which generated protest.

In 1981 he was awarded an Honorary Doctorate of Civil Law by the University of Kent, and an OBE in 1985. He published his memoirs "Making Music" in 2001 and died in Ashford on 4 January 2004.

Platt sang Filch and Jeremy Twitcher for the performances of The Beggar's Opera by the English Opera Group under Benjamin Britten in 1948, and this was issued on CDs in 2006. He also took part in audio recordings by the Deller Consort of music by Gesualdo, Monteverdi, Purcell (including roles in The Fairy-Queen), and Weelkes.

In his Opera magazine obituary, Rodney Milnes wrote "He was a true maverick, a North Country Diaghilev, a personality that the 'polite' UK arts establishment found it hard to cope with. He was without doubt one of the most significant figures in British opera in the second half of the 20th century".
