= The Black Spider (1921 film) =

1921 film

- German: Die schwarze Spinne
- Directed by: Siegfried Philippi
- Written by: Siegfried Philippi
- Based on: The Black Spider by Jeremias Gotthelf
- Starring: Olga Engl; Hugo Flink; Charles Willy Kayser; Rudolf Klein-Rhoden
- Cinematography: Heinrich Gärtner
- Production company: Turma Film
- Release date: 8 August 1921
- Country: Germany
- Languages: Silent; German intertitles

The Black Spider (German: Die schwarze Spinne) is a 1921 German silent horror film directed by Siegfried Philippi and starring Olga Engl, Hugo Flink, and Charles Willy Kayser. It is based on the novella The Black Spider by Jeremias Gotthelf. It premiered in Berlin on 8 August 1921.

== Cast ==
In alphabetical order

- Olga Engl
- Hugo Flink
- Charles Willy Kayser
- Rudolf Klein-Rhoden
- Marga Köhler
- Lissi Lind
- Max Ruhbeck
- Joseph Römer
- Ortrud Wagner
