= Anne-Marie Owens =

English mezzo-soprano

Anne-Marie Owens (born 1955) is an English mezzo-soprano.

Born in South Shields, Owens graduated from the Guildhall School of Music and Drama, where she studied with Laura Sarti, and also performed with the National Opera Studio. Her professional debut came as Mistress Quickly with Glyndebourne Touring Opera. In 1985 Owens became a member of the company at English National Opera. Roles which she performed during her time there included Anežka in The Two Widows; Marfa in Khovanshchina; Jezibaba in Rusalka; and Berthe in Blond Eckbert. She has also appeared with the Welsh National Opera; La Monnaie; the Komische Oper Berlin; Scottish Opera; Garsington Opera; Opera Australia; Wexford Festival Opera; and Opera North during her career. In 1996 she created the role of Aunt Hannah Watkins in the world premiere of Tobias Picker's Emmeline for Santa Fe Opera; the following year she repeated the role at New York City Opera. Owens has appeared in operas ranging from Tristan und Isolde to The Turn of the Screw during her career. She has recorded The Mask of Orpheus, Sir John in Love, The Pilgrim's Progress, and L'enfant et les sortilèges.

In 2015 Owens made her debut in pantomime, playing the Queen of Hearts in Alice in Wonderland in her hometown of South Shields.
