= A Night at the Chinese Opera =

Opera by Judith Weir

- Opera by Judith Weir
- Librettist: Weir
- Language: English
- Based on: The Orphan of Zhao
- Premiere: 8 July 1987; Kent Opera

A Night at the Chinese Opera is an opera in three acts by Judith Weir, who also wrote the libretto. Aside from an earlier opera for children, this was Weir's first full-scale opera, written on commission from the BBC for performance by Kent Opera. Weir incorporated an early Chinese play of the Yuan dynasty, The Orphan of Zhao, as the centrepiece of Act 2 of her opera.

The work received its premiere on 8 July 1987 at the Everyman Theatre, Cheltenham, England. The Opera magazine critic noted that "few new operas have recently made so diverting a first impression as A Night at the Chinese Opera, partly on its intrinsic musico-dramatic merits, partly through the style of production".

The outer acts are fully scored for the chamber orchestra in 'closed-forms' such as aria, sextet, seven-part motet but the Yuan play is mostly scored for flute, lower strings and percussion.

== Roles ==
Role	Voice type	Premiere cast, Cheltenham Music Festival, 8 July 1987 (Conductor: Andrew Parrott)
Little Moon / Actor	soprano	Meryl Drower
Mrs Chin / Old Crone	mezzo-soprano	Enid Hartle
An Actor	soprano	Frances Lynch
Chao Lin as a boy		Diccon Cooper
Military Governor	countertenor	Michael Chance
Old P'eng / Mountain Dweller	tenor	David Johnston
Nightwatchman / Marco Polo	tenor	Tomos Ellis
Chao Lin	baritone	Gwion Thomas
An Actor	baritone	Alan Oke
Chao Sun / Fireman	baritone	Stuart Buchanan
Mongolian Soldier	baritone	Jonathan Best

== Performance history ==
Kent Opera subsequently took the opera on tour to Dartford, Canterbury, Plymouth, Southsea and Eastbourne during their 1987–88 season. Santa Fe Opera gave the US premiere of the opera in July 1989. The second British production was at the Glasgow Royal Concert Hall on 26 February 1999 as a semi-staged concert. A third British production was by the Royal Academy of Music in March 2006. The first staged production in Scotland, at Scottish Opera, was in April 2008. British Youth Opera performed it during September 2012.

The Kent Opera production was recorded for television by the BBC in 1988, directed by Barrie Gavin.

== Synopsis ==
Place: China
Time: 13th-century

Chao Sun is an explorer and mapmaker who is exiled from the city of Loyan. His son Chao Lin becomes the supervisor of the building of a canal. His workers include a group of actors.

One evening, the actors/workers perform the old Chinese opera The Chao Family Orphan. The older drama tells of the evil General Tuan-Ku, who causes his servant Chao and his wife to commit suicide by forging a seemingly official letter from the Emperor instructing Chao to take his own life. Their young son is left behind as an orphan. Unwittingly, the General later adopts and raises the child as his own son. Twenty years later, there is a conspiracy to overthrow the emperor. The orphan gradually learns his true birth identity and the fate of his parents, and joins the plot for revenge. An earthquake, however, interrupts the conspiracy and the actors are arrested.

Chao Lin's work on the canal is praised. At one point, when he is surveying the canal, Chao meets an old woman who tells him of what happened to his father. In parallel to the Chao Family Orphan story, Chao Lin plans vengeance on his father's enemies. However, Chao Lin is captured and executed for his conspiracy. The actors who were performing The Chao Family Orphan then return to complete the play, where the son does succeed in avenging his father against General Tuan-Ku.
