= Biseriate =

Biseriate is a botanical term applied to both plantae and fungi, meaning 'arranged in two rows'.

The term can refer to any number of structures found within these kingdoms, from arrangement of leaves to the placement of spores.

It becomes useful in taxonomy for placing a species within a certain genus, family, or even order, based upon morphology, when making an initial choice or when DNA evidence is inconclusive.
