= The Vanishing Bridegroom =

Opera by Judith Weir

- Opera by Judith Weir
- Librettist: Weir
- Language: English
- Premiere: 1990; Scottish Opera, Glasgow

The Vanishing Bridegroom is an opera by composer Judith Weir to a libretto by the composer from work edited by J. F. Campbell of Islay. Commissioned by the Glasgow District Council, the opera was premiered by the Scottish Opera as a part of the 1990 European Capital of Culture celebrations in Glasgow. The United States premiere of the opera was given by the Opera Theatre of Saint Louis in 1992 (under the title Highland Wedding) with soprano Lauren Flanigan as the Bride/Wife/Mother.

The compositional style is primarily polytonal and polyrhythmic, with elements of minimalism and atonality. Woodwinds are used throughout to introduce Gaelic folk melodies, with violin often being employed as a fiddle, either solo or in duet. The three acts vary stylistically, although some musical gestures are common to all three, such as long rising glissandos in the string section.

The opera was broadcast by BBC TV in 1991 in a production directed for television by Mike Newman, with the Scottish Opera production, directed by Ian Spink and conducted by Justin Brown.

== Synopsis ==
The opera is written in three acts, each a retelling of a Scottish folk story. The opera loosely weaves the stories together into a narrative thread.

The Inheritance. On his deathbed the Father tells his three Sons that they will find their inheritance in the chest of drawers. He dies and the Sons search the chest of drawers for the inheritance money but it cannot be found. The three sons ask the Doctor (who had been a friend of their father) for advice and in response he tells a parable of a bride who swore to love one man but was forced to marry another. When the Bridegroom finds out about the woman’s Lover, he sends her back to the Lover with her dowry but the Lover rejects both the dowry and the Bride. On her return journey to the Bridegroom three robbers waylay her. Two of them make off with the dowry but the third takes pity on her and helps her to get home. When the Doctor asks the Sons which character in his tale “did the best”. the youngest son’s response reveals that he is the guilty party and the stolen money is found on him.

The Vanishing. It is night and the Father sets out from his house, accompanied by the Friend, to bring a priest to conduct the christening. On the way the Father laments … an extra mouth to feed, the misfortunes that have befallen him … and then he sees a golden glow emanating from a hill and is lured in by fairies. His friend, powerless to stop him, returns to the house; the women have summoned the Policeman and the Friend tries to explain what happened while the Policeman implies the Friend has killed the Husband. Protesting his innocence the Friend leads the Policeman to the enchanted hill and they wait. Years pass and they wait. Then the Husband emerges, still a young man and blissfully unaware of the passage of time, while the Friend and Policeman have aged and withered. The Friend leads the Husband away from the hill and the Husband recollects his mission of finding a priest for the Christening but the Friend leads him homeward to meet his now fully-grown daughter.

The Stranger. The Daughter, now a grown woman, is singing a folksong as she works in a hillside pasture when a Stranger appears. While he woos her with flattery and conjures gold from the soil, the Father and Mother observe from a distance. The Stranger disappears and the parents comment on how charming he seemed but the Daughter has observed his unearthly appearance. A passing Preacher overhears the conversation and, declaring the Stranger to be the Devil, the Preacher marks a circle around the Daughter and utters a protective prayer. Preacher, Mother and Father leave and the Stranger returns but all his malevolence cannot harm the Daughter as she sings the concluding verse of the folksong and the Stranger, now clearly in the form of The Devil is defeated and disappears.
