= Armida (Weir) =

Opera by Judith Weir

- Opera by Judith Weir
- Librettist: Weir
- Language: English
- Based on: Torquato Tasso's La Gerusalemme liberata
- Premiere: 25 December 2005; Television broadcast

Armida is an opera by British composer Judith Weir. It premiered on 25 December 2005 as a television broadcast on the UK station, Channel 4 which had commissioned the work. The English libretto, also written by Weir, is loosely based on the story of Rinaldo and Armida, in Torquato Tasso's 1581 epic poem set in the First Crusade, La Gerusalemme liberata (Jerusalem Delivered).

Armida had been a highly popular subject for operas in the 18th and early 19th Centuries, but only rarely afterwards.

In Weir's 50-minute-long opera, the setting is updated to a modern Middle-East conflict which alludes to but never specifically mentions the Iraq War. Rinaldo, Tasso's Christian knight, becomes an army officer conflicted about his love for peace and his duty as a soldier. Armida, Tasso's beautiful Muslim sorceress, becomes a high-powered television journalist, equally conflicted by her profession as a war reporter in her occupied country. She enters the army camp, ostensibly to interview the soldiers, but with the intention of subverting them. When she and Rinaldo fall in love, she spirits him away in her news helicopter to an enchanted Moorish city. His fellow soldiers try to free him, but Rinaldo no longer has an appetite for combat. In the end, love triumphs as both journalism and soldiering are replaced by what Weir calls in her libretto "cultivation and repose". Rinaldo and his comrades start growing flowers and vegetables in the desert. Armida's employer, Metropolis News, decides to stop covering wars and specialise in gardening shows.

The instrumental score was written for bass clarinet, soprano saxophone, percussion, piano and strings and was performed in the premiere by The Continuum Ensemble conducted by Philip Headlam. The title role was sung by American soprano Talise Trevigne while the American tenor, Kenneth Tarver sang Rinaldo. The production, filmed in Morocco, was directed by Margaret Williams.

The opera was also the subject of a 2005 documentary film, Judith Weir: Armida and Other Stories, directed by Teresa Griffiths.

The world stage premiere of Armida was February 2019 in Manchester at the Martin Harris Centre, with students of the university portraying the characters. Armida and Rinaldo were played by Katie Emanuel and Zahid Siddiqui. The production was conducted by Anna Beresford and directed by Emily Tandy.

== Roles ==
Role	Voice type	Premiere Cast, 25 December 2005 (Conductor: Philip Headlam)	Stage Premiere Cast, 22 February 2019 (Conductor: Anna Beresford)
Armida	soprano	Talise Trevigne	Katie Emanuel
Rinaldo	tenor	Kenneth Tarver	Zahid Siddiqui
Goffredo	bass	Dean Robinson	Jonathan Hill
Ms. Pescado, a weather reporter, Armida's friend	soprano	Donna Bateman	Laura Rushforth
Idraote	bass or bass-baritone	Nicholas Folwell	Hugh Summers
Carlo	baritone	Grant Doyle	Philip Haynes
Ubaldo	tenor	Olivier Dumait	Matthew Quinn
