= Franz Karl Basler-Kopp =

Swiss artist (1879–1937)

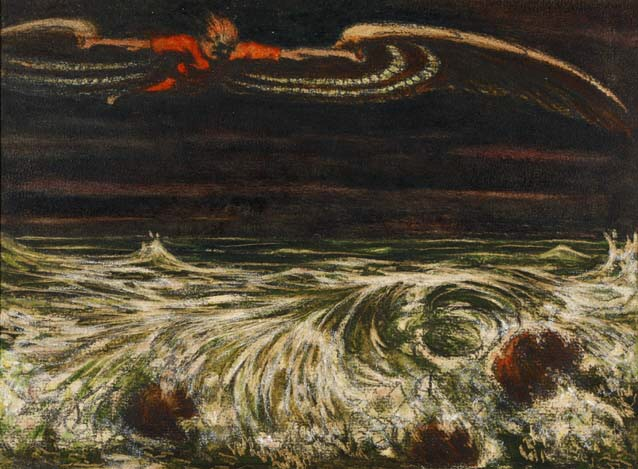
Schmied Völund (Wayland the Smith), undated

Franz Karl Basler-Kopp (1879–1937) was a Swiss painter. In addition to works with historic and biblical scenes, symbolic portrayals of the phases of life, he created, most famously, illustrations of legends and fairy tales. He was educated at the Lucerne University of Applied Sciences and Arts.

He became known as a "fairy tale painter" ("Märchenmaler") through his illustrations of Arnold Büchli's three-volume work Schweizersagen (Swiss legends) (1926, 1928 and 1931) as well as through his illustration and cover design of several books, some of which were written for literary and musical education in schools, such as Osterhas, Sankt Nicolas, Weihnacht und Neujahr by Eduard Fischer (1926) and the book of fairy tales Am Märchenbrunnen by Helene Kopp.

== Life ==
Franz Karl Basler was born in Basel on February 17, 1879 to a farming family from South Bavaria. Shortly after his birth, the family moved from Basel to Lucerne, where Basler grew up in poor conditions. He later compensated for his lack of education with intensive reading of widely diverse literature, from which he almost always drew motifs for his artwork. While still at school he also lost use of his right hand following an infection and became lefthanded.

From 1893 to 1898 he studied glass sculpting at the Lucerne School of Art and Design. However, he was more interested in painting on canvas and paper, to which he devoted himself in his spare time. After his education he no longer attended schools, nor did he seek contact with colleagues. He remained a retired recluse for the rest of his life. In 1905 he married Julia Kopp, the daughter of the headteacher of Lucerne School. He found in her a companion with whom he shared his life struggle, particularly during the long years of his severe illness in later life.

In both 1912 and 1914 he traveled to Munich. On the first study trip, he took part in an exhibition in Munich, after which he was invited by Ferdinand Avenarius, the director of the "Kunstwart", to publish some pictures. This was also the start of a friendship, which lasted until Avenarius' death in 1923. Over the course of their friendship they both discussed at length the relationship between art and humans and their mutual alienation.

Every year from 1910 to 1919, Basler took part first in national art exhibitions, then in those in the Kunsthaus Zürich, although he only submitted a few pieces. Afterwards, however, he almost totally stopped taking part. It was not until 1931, encouraged by his friends and organised by the Lucerne Museum of Art, that he once again published 70 paintings and drawings in the old War and Peace Museum.

Basler's paintings had few buyers. One of them was the ETH Professor Adolf Tobler, who purchased a series of pictures for his villa in Zürichberg. From 1922 to 1923 he also made it possible for him to take two trips to Germany, to Dresden and Hamburg, where Avenarius let him use his house on the island of Sylt. Both these trips are reflected in many Nordic motifs, in Fremde – Heimkehr, among others.

Artistic freedom meant everything to Basler, regardless of existential issues. Thus he declined an offer from the Munich Fliegende Blätter to join them as a fairy tale illustrator. However he worked regularly for the publisher Sauerländer for some years. His illustrations for the three volume work of Swiss legends by Arnold Büchli became particularly famous, a work that also left its mark on his paintings, for example in Hexenhaftler.

As an artist Basler was a late-born romanticist, driven to continue the artistic elements that found their great fulfillment in Spitzweg, Welti, Böcklin, a narrator and illustrator who created a fairytale and saga of highly individual sentiment, relying on the pictorial power of popular poetry.

He lived the last years of his life unconcerned about the artistic Zeitgeist, from which he always distanced himself with his own creations, and led a true hermit's life. A terrible illness that he had long been suffering from took his life on April 1, 1937.

== Works ==
- Die Hexenhalfter, Kreide auf Papier, Kunstmuseum Luzern
- Fremde – Heimkehr, Öl auf Kupfer, Kunstmuseum Luzern
- Die schwarze Spinne, Kreide auf Papier, Kunstmuseum Luzern
- Vor dem Stadttor, Pastell auf Karton, Kunstmuseum Luzern

== Literature ==
- Kunstwart 1916, Heft 29, S. 96.
- Kunstwart 1921, Heft 11, S. 311.
