= Blond Eckbert =

Opera by Judith Weir

- Opera by Judith Weir
- Librettist: Weir
- Language: English
- Based on: Ludwig Tieck's Der blonde Eckbert
- Premiere: 20 April 1994; London Coliseum

Blond Eckbert is an opera by Scottish composer Judith Weir. The composer wrote the English-language libretto herself, basing it on the cryptic supernatural short story Der blonde Eckbert by the German Romantic writer Ludwig Tieck. Weir completed the original two-act version of the opera in 1993, making Blond Eckbert her third full-length work in the genre. Like its predecessors, it was received well by the critics. She later produced a one act "pocket" version of the work. This uses chamber forces rather than the full orchestra of the two act version and omits the chorus. The pocket version receives frequent performances, especially in Germany and Austria, while the full version is available in a recording featuring the original cast.

== Preparation of the libretto ==
Ludwig Tieck wrote Der blonde Eckbert in 1796 and had it published in 1797 as part of his Peter Lebrechts Märchen (Peter Lebrecht's Fairy-tales). The story was the earliest example of the genre of Kunstmärchen, or German Romantic literary fairy tales.

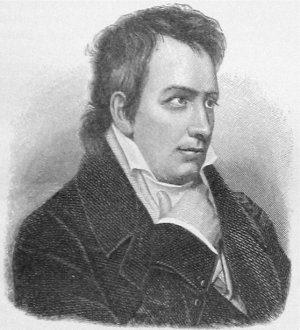
Ludwig Tieck the author of the original story on which the opera is based.

In the story, both the landscape and the variations in the song sung by the magic bird mirror the changing moods of the characters. A constant motif in the song is the concept of forest solitude or Waldeinsamkeit, a word Tieck coined in the story to stand for Romantic joy at being alone in nature. But not everything is joyful, for the story breaks with the fairy-tale tradition of a happy ending. The ruin of the protagonist involves the breaking down of the barriers between the world of the supernatural and that of everyday life, leaving the reader unable to tell where one end and the other begins.

Weir replaces the voice of Tieck's narrator with that of the bird. The text consists of a series of nested narratives. The bird tells the story of Eckbert and Berthe to the dog. And in that story, Bertha narrates events in her past and Eckbert reads her letter. The New York Times critic Bernard Holland describes the plot as "inscrutable" and "full of effects but bereft of causes". In looking for an explanation, he suggests that the figure of Walther in his various forms is a representation of memory and his murder as a sign of how what is remembered is intolerable. However, having put this explanation forward, Holland then goes on to say of the text "Perhaps it is interpretation-proof. This overeagerness to impose sense on nonsense ends up compromising a story meant more to be beheld than understood."

Anthony Tommasini, another critic at the same paper, describes the opera as "balancing between whimsy and terror". The whimsy can be illustrated by Berthe describing the bird's song in terms of instruments in Weir's orchestra, ("you would have thought the horn and the oboe were playing",) and by a parody of the Tieck's Waldeinsamkeit verse in which the bird instructed to sing the line "Alone in the wood, I don't feel so good" as if airsick.

== Performance history ==
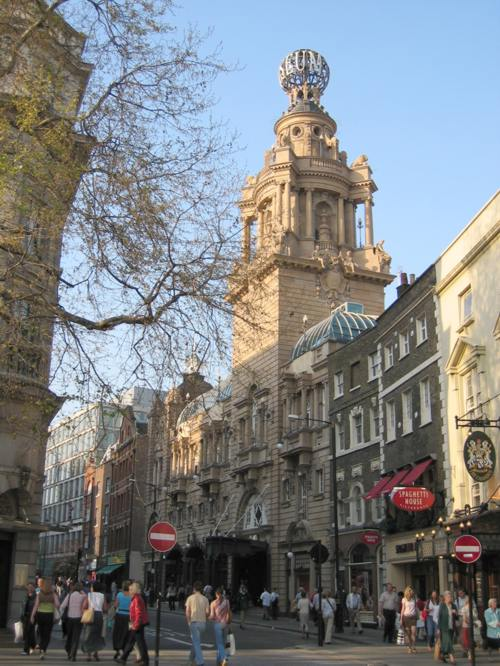
The London Coliseum where Blond Eckbert was first staged in 1994.

The opera was first performed on 20 April 1994 by English National Opera at the London Coliseum. This full-length version was expected by the composer to last approximately one hour and twenty minutes, but a recording of the performances takes approximately 65 minutes.

Blond Eckbert was given its American debut by the Santa Fe Opera in August 1994. In 2003, the North German Radio Symphony Orchestra gave a concert performance of the opera with slide projections.

A more lightly scored one-act "pocket" version of the opera, lasting less than an hour, was premiered on 14 June 2006 at the Linbury Studio of the Royal Opera House by The Opera Group and subsequently toured. Further performances of the pocket version by various German and Austrian groups have taken place in 2007, 2008 and 2009.

== Roles ==
Role	Voice type	Full version Premiere, 20 April 1994 (Sian Edwards)	Pocket Version Premiere, 14 June 2006 (Patrick Bailey)
Blond Eckbert	baritone	Nicholas Folwell	Owen Gilhooly
Berthe, his wife	mezzo-soprano	Anne-Marie Owens	Heather Shipp
Walther, his friend Hugo, his friend An old woman	tenor	Christopher Ventris	Mark Wilde
A bird	soprano	Nerys Jones	Claire Wild
A dog	non-singing part	Thor	
Chorus	SATB	English National Opera Chorus	None

== Music ==
The two-act version of Blond Eckbert is scored for double woodwind, (second players doubling piccolo, cor anglais, bass clarinet and contrabassoon,) four horns, three trumpets, three trombones, timpani and one other percussion player, harp and strings. The percussion consists of glockenspiel, suspended cymbal, xylophone, tenor drum, bell or small gong and three differently pitched cowbells. The pocket version is written for oboe, 2 clarinets (1 doubling bass clarinet), 2 horns, harp, 2 violins, and 2 cellos with no chorus.

Tommasini recognises Weir's musical voice as individual but he considers her to be more interested in consolidating the musical past than innovation or contemporary schools of music. Her music is, in Holland's words, "neither terribly old nor terribly new". While its language is modernist, it does not go far into the realms of dissonance. Tommasini lists Berg, Messiaen, big band jazz and German romanticism as among the influences on her. When interviewed for the programme notes to the first production, Weir placed herself musically more in a Stravinskian tradition than one based on Britten.

Much of the vocal writing consists of short phrases of speech song, written more to support the text than to be musically interesting in itself. It is accompanied by chordal progressions or brief bursts of melody in the orchestra.

When Tom Service reviewed the chamber version of the opera for the Guardian, he felt that the virtues of Weir's compact musical style and her ability to tell a story with the smallest of musical gestures are even more evident in the later version than in the original.

While Tommasini welcomed the recording of Blond Eckbert and Service is enthusiastic about both its versions, other critics are more ambivalent. Holland finds the work episodic and lacking in development. He recognises Weir's ear for orchestration and graceful writing but feels she could have done more with it. Andrew Clark of the Financial Times also feels that more might have been made of the work by providing orchestral interludes or extended vocal numbers. However, he also identifies compactness as one of the works virtues.

Writing in Grove, David C. H. Wright sees a deliberate strategy in the understatement of much of the music: the conclusion of the opera, with the orchestra providing the composer's commentary on events, is all the more powerful because of the contrast with the first act.

== Synopsis ==
=== Act 1 ===
The bird describes how Eckbert peacefully lives alone with his wife. They have few visitors apart from Walther, a strange man from a few towns over. The opening scene reveals Eckbert and Berthe at home. Eckbert sees a light in the distance which he correctly takes to be Walther. Walther often travels through the forest and has been out collecting natural history specimens. Eckbert speaks about how it is good to be able to tell friends secrets. When Walther arrives, Eckbert decides to get Berthe to tell Walther the story of her youth.

Berthe describes how she grew up in a poor shepherd's home and how she ran away because she was a burden on her parents who were often angry. She met an old woman in black who led her to her house. Berthe lived there, cooking and spinning and minding the home. Also in the house were a dog, whose name Berthe has forgotten, and a bird that lays gems for eggs. Eventually Berthe stole the gems, and attempted to steal the bird as well. She set the bird free when it began to sing. She returned to her home village to find her parents dead. She sold some gems and became wealthy enough to buy a home and marry Eckbert.

Walther thanks Berthe for telling the tale and says how he can really imagine the bird and the little dog, Strohmian. Both Eckbert and Berthe are amazed that Walther knows the dog's name. They are terribly afraid of Walther stealing their remaining fortune. When Walther goes out the next day, Eckbert follows him with a crossbow.

=== Act 2 ===
The prelude describes Eckbert's killing of Walther. Eckbert then reads a letter aloud. The letter was written by Berthe as she was dying. The letter details her fear and anxiety about Walther knowing the dog's name.

In a busy town, Eckbert meets Hugo. Eckbert is accused of murdering Walther by the townspeople. Hugo saves him, but suddenly Eckbert recognises him as the deceased Walther. He flees into the forest.

Eventually Eckbert comes to the place described by Berthe as where she met the old woman. He sees another man who reminds him of Walther. The bird flies over head as he approaches the old woman's house. The old woman is at the house and asks if Eckbert is bringing back the gems that were stolen from her.

She reveals to Eckbert: "I was Walther, I was Hugo." She also tells him that Berthe was his half-sister, the extramarital child of her father. She had been given a life with the old woman and her time of trials was almost over when she stole the bird and gems. Eckbert goes insane and dies.

== Recordings ==
A live recording of the original cast of the two-act version of Blond Eckbert has been released on CD. A film featuring the same cast, adapted by Margaret Williams from Tim Hopkins's ENO production, was broadcast by Channel 4 and later shown at the Huddersfield Contemporary Music Festival.
