= Judith Weir =

British composer (born 1954)

Dame Judith Weir DBE HonFRSE
- Born: 11 May 1954 (age 72); Cambridge, England, UK
- Occupation: Composer
- Works: List of compositions

21st Master of the King's Music
- In office 22 July 2014 – 22 July 2024
- Monarchs: Elizabeth II; Charles III
- Preceded by: Peter Maxwell Davies
- Succeeded by: Errollyn Wallen
- Website: www.judithweir.com

Dame Judith Weir (born 11 May 1954) is a British composer. She served as Master of the King's Music from 2014 to 2024. Appointed by Queen Elizabeth II, Weir was the first woman to hold this office.

== Early life ==
Weir was born in Cambridge, England, to Scottish parents from Aberdeen. It was a musical household, with her father playing the trumpet and her mother the viola; the family moved house to Harrow and she began to play the oboe in her early teens. She studied with John Tavener while at the North London Collegiate School and subsequently with Robin Holloway at King's College, Cambridge, graduating in 1976.

== Career ==
The first of her works to be heard professionally was Where the Shining Trumpets Blow, given by the New Philharmonia in 1974. Before going to Cambridge Weir had a six-month period at the Massachusetts Institute of Technology learning about computer music and acoustics. Her work Campanile "in which a concertino core derived from Bach's Nun ist das Heil is framed by two Brahmsian elegies" won the first prize in the International Festival of Youth Orchestras in Aberdeen in 1974 where the jury included Aaron Copland. She won a Koussevitzky Fellowship studying with Gunther Schuller at Tanglewood the following summer which resulted in several compositions including what "she consider[ed] her true opus 1", Out of the Air. In early 1976 she won the Greater London Arts Association young musicians' composition award.

From 1976 to 1979 Weir was the Composer-in-Residence with the Southern Arts Association in southern England, where she ran courses for children and adults and took part in artistic projects. She lectured at Glasgow University as a Cramb Fellow from 1979 to 1982, and similarly was a creative arts fellow from 1983 to 1985 at Trinity College, Cambridge. At the Royal Scottish Academy of Music and Drama, Glasgow, Weir served as Guinness composer-in-residence from 1988 to 1991. She held the post of Composer in Association for the City of Birmingham Symphony Orchestra from 1995 to 1998. From 1995 to 2000, she was Artistic Director of the Spitalfields Festival in London.

Weir’s music often draws on sources from medieval history, as well as the traditional stories and music of her parents' homeland, Scotland. Although she has achieved international recognition for her orchestral and chamber works, Weir is best known for her operas and theatrical works. Influenced by Stravinsky, her musical language is fairly conservative, with a "knack of making simple musical ideas appear freshly mysterious", and, later in her career, explained that pleasure in listening and curiosity guide her choices. Her first stage work, The Black Spider, is a one-act opera that was premiered in Canterbury in 1985, loosely based on the short novel of the same name by Jeremias Gotthelf. She has subsequently written one more "micro-opera", three full-length operas, and an opera for television. In 1987, her first half-length opera, A Night at the Chinese Opera, was premiered at Kent Opera. This was followed by a further three full-length operas: The Vanishing Bridegroom (1990); Blond Eckbert (1994, commissioned by English National Opera); and Miss Fortune (Achterbahn) (2011). Her opera Armida, an opera for television, was premiered on Channel Four in the United Kingdom in 2005. The work was made in co-operation with Margaret Williams. Weir's commissioned works most notably include We are Shadows (1999) for Simon Rattle and woman.life.song (2000) for Jessye Norman. In January 2008, Weir was the focus of the BBC's annual composer weekend at the Barbican Centre in London. The four days of programmes ended with a first performance of her new commission, CONCRETE, a choral motet. The subject of this piece was inspired by the Barbican building itself – she describes it as 'an imaginary excavation of the Barbican Centre, burrowing through 2,500 years of historical rubble'.

She was a visiting distinguished research professor in composition at Cardiff University from 2006 to 2009.

On 30 June 2014, The Guardian stated that her appointment as Master of the Queen's Music, succeeding Sir Peter Maxwell Davies (whose term of office expired in March 2014), would be announced; this was officially confirmed on 21 July. She was appointed for a decade.

The first public performance of Weir's arrangement of "God Save the Queen" was performed at the reburial of King Richard III at Leicester Cathedral on 26 March 2015. She was commissioned to compose an a cappella work for the state funeral of Elizabeth II on 19 September 2022, and wrote a setting of Psalm 42, "Like as the hart".

In 2023, Weir was one of twelve composers asked to write a new piece for the coronation of Charles III and Camilla. Her composition for orchestra, Brighter Visions Shine Afar, was performed before the ceremony began.

Dame Judith is President of the Royal Society of Musicians of Great Britain (RSM).

Weir is a member of the Incorporated Society of Musicians.

== Awards and recognition ==
Weir was appointed Commander of the Order of the British Empire (CBE) in the 1995 Birthday Honours for services to music, and was promoted Dame Commander of the Order of the British Empire (DBE) in the 2024 New Year Honours for services to music.

She received the Lincoln Center's Stoeger Prize in 1997, the South Bank Show music award in 2001 and the Incorporated Society of Musicians' Distinguished Musician Award in 2010.

In 2007 she was the third recipient of the Queen's Medal for Music.

In May 2015 Weir won The Ivors Classical Music Award at the Ivor Novello Awards.

In 2018 she was elected an Honorary Fellow of the Royal Society of Edinburgh and an Honorary Fellow of Trinity College Cambridge and in 2023 she was made an Honorary Fellow of Royal Holloway, University of London.

In October 2025 Weir was nominated for an Ivor Novello Award in the Best Large Ensemble Composition category for her piece Planet for chamber orchestra.

== List of compositions ==
=== Opera and music theatre ===
- King Harald's Saga (1979, soprano, singing eight roles)
- The Black Spider (6 March 1985, Canterbury); also exists in an expanded version for Hamburg State Opera (8 February 2009, Hamburg)
- The Consolations of Scholarship (5 May 1985, Durham, soprano, chamber ensemble)
- A Night at the Chinese Opera (8 July 1987, Cheltenham)
- HEAVEN ABLAZE in His Breast (5 October 1989, Basildon), based on E.T.A. Hoffmann's The Sandman, which won the prize for innovative work at OperaScreen in 1991.
- The Vanishing Bridegroom (1990, Glasgow); also exists in a chamber version (1990)
- Scipio's Dream (24 November 1991, television broadcast for the BBC), based on Il sogno di Scipione by Metastasio
- The Skriker (27 January 1994, London) – music for Caryl Churchill's play of the same name
- Blond Eckbert (20 April 1994, London); also exists in a so-called "pocket version" (reduced to one act from two) (2006)
- Armida (2005, television broadcast for Channel Four in the United Kingdom)
- Miss Fortune (opera) (Achterbahn "rollercoaster") (21 July 2011, Bregenzer Festspiele)

=== Other compositions ===
- Music for 247 Strings (1981, violin, piano)
- Thread! (1981, narrator, chamber ensemble)
- Scotch Minstrelsy (1982, tenor or soprano, piano)
- Wild Mossy Mountains (1982, organ)
- The Art of Touching the Keyboard (1983, piano)
- Ettrick Banks (1985, organ)
- Michael's Strathspey (1984, piano, also version for organ)
- Missa Del Cid (1988, SAAATTTBBB choir), originally part of BBC's Sound on Film series; later used independently in concert and on stage.
- String Quartet (1990)
- Musicians Wrestle Everywhere (1994, flute, oboe, bass clarinet, horn, trombone, piano, cello, double bass)
- Forest (1995, orchestra)
- Piano Concerto (1997, piano, strings)
- Storm (1997, children's choir, SSAA choir, chamber ensemble)
- Natural History (1998, soprano, orchestra)
- Piano Trio (1998)
- We Are Shadows (1999, children's choir, SATB choir, orchestra)
- Piano Quartet (2000)
- woman.life.song (2000, premiered by Jessye Norman at Carnegie Hall, soprano, chamber ensemble)
- The welcome arrival of rain (2001–2002, orchestra)
- Tiger Under the Table (2002, chamber ensemble)
- Piano Trio Two (2003–2004)
- Winter Song (2006, orchestra)
- CONCRETE (2007, speaker, SATB choir, orchestra)
- I give you the end of a golden string (2013, strings)
- In the Land of Uz (2017, SATB choir, soprano saxophone, trumpet, tuba, organ, viola, double bass)
- Oboe Concerto (2018, oboe, orchestra)
- The Prelude (2018–2019, flute, violin, viola, cello)
- The True Light (2018, SATB choir, organ) for the First World War centenary
- By Wisdom (2018, SATB choir, organ) for the Platinum Jubilee of Elizabeth II
- On White Meadows (2020, mezzo-soprano and piano)
- Music, Spread Thy Voice (2022, orchestra) for the 150th Anniversary of the Royal Orchestral Society
- Like as the hart (2022, SATB choir, organ) for the state funeral of Elizabeth II.*
- Begin Afresh (2022, orchestra)
- Brighter Visions Shine Afar (2023, orchestra) for the coronation of Charles III and Camilla

== Recordings ==
- Blond Eckbert Nicholas Folwell (baritone), Blond Eckbert; Anne-Marie Owens, Christopher Ventris, Nerys Jones; Chorus and Orchestra of English National Opera; Sian Edwards (conductor) Collins Classics: CD14612 / NMC: NMC D106 (2006)
- In the Land of Uz – Yale Schola Cantorum, David Hill. Hyperion CDA68466 (2025)
- King Harald's Saga – Judith Weir, Ailish Tynan, Iain Burnside. Cala CACD88040 (2006)
- A Night at the Chinese Opera – Andrew Parrott, Scottish Chamber Orchestra. NMC D060 (2000)
- Piano Concerto; Distance and Enchantment; various other chamber works – William Howard, Schubert Ensemble. NMC D090 (2002)
- On Buying a Horse: The songs of Judith Weir On Buying a Horse; Ox Mountain Was Covered by Trees; Songs from the Exotic; Scotch Minstrelsy; The Voice of Desire; A Spanish Liederbooklet; King Harald's Saga; Ständchen. Susan Bickley (mezzo-soprano), Andrew Kennedy (tenor), Ailish Tynan (soprano), Ian Burnside (piano) Signum SIGCD087 (2006)
- The Vanishing Bridegroom. Ailish Tynan (soprano), Anna Stéphany (soprano), Andrew Tortise (tenor), Owen Gilhooly (baritone), Jonathan Lemalu (bass-baritone), BBC Singers, BBC Symphony Orchestra; Martyn Brabbins (conductor) – NMC D196 (2014)

Court offices
Preceded by Peter Maxwell Davies	Master of the King's Music; 2014–2024	Succeeded by Errollyn Wallen
