= List of string quartet composers =

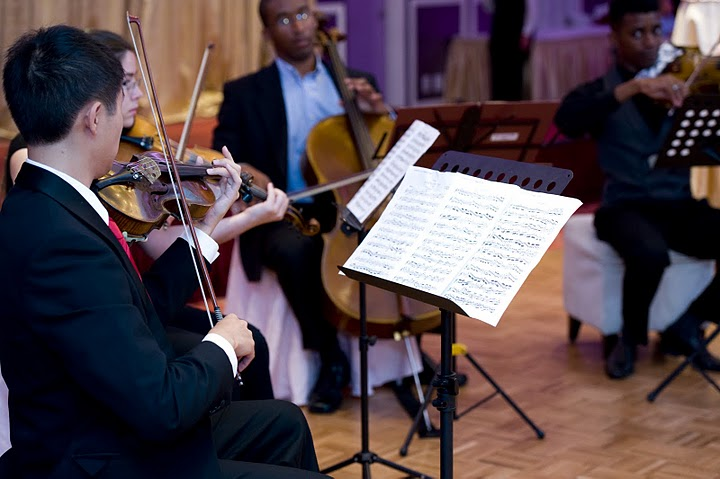
String quartet in performance

This is a list of string quartet composers, chronologically sorted by date of birth and then by surname. It includes only composers who have Wikipedia articles. This list is by no means complete. String quartets are written for four string instruments—usually two violins, viola and cello—unless stated otherwise.

== Born in the 16th century ==
- Gregorio Allegri (1582–1652): The earliest known composition for two violins, viola and cello (although is referred to as "Duoi Violini, Alto, & Basso di Viola") is attributed to him. Scholars often refer to it as a "Symphonia" or as a four-part sonata. Still, it is the very first example of a composition for this combination which does not involve the use of a basso continuo, which was unusual to omit at that time.

== Born in the 17th century ==
- Alessandro Scarlatti (1660–1725): Amongst his output of chamber sonatas, he wrote a set of Sonate a quattro per due violini, violetta e violoncello senza cembalo (c. 1715–1725).
- Georg Philipp Telemann (1681–1767): An example is Sonata á Violino I, Violino II, Viola e Violono in A major TWV 40:200. There is an expanded version for chamber string orchestra.

== Born in the 18th century ==
=== Born in the 1700s ===
- Giovanni Battista Sammartini (c. 1700–1775): Wrote several quartets, though as with many early works for the medium, some of these could be played equally appropriately by a small string orchestra.
- Franz Xaver Richter (1709–1789): Wrote seven string quartets, Op. 5 (1757).

=== Born in the 1720s ===
- Pietro Nardini (1722–1793): six string quartets, published around 1767.
- Carl Friedrich Abel (1723–1787): published in groups of six: Op. 8 (1769); Op. 12 (1775), Op. 15 (1789).
- Giovanni Battista Cirri (1724–1808): 6 String Quartets Op. 13
- Franz Asplmayr (1728–1786): published in groups of six: Op. 6 (c.1765), Op. 2 (1769)
- Florian Leopold Gassmann (1729–1774): He is thought to have composed 37 string quartets, including six quartetti published c. 1768 as Op. 1 (H431–6); a set published as Op. 2 (H441–2, 435, 444–6); and a further six published posthumously in 1804 (H451–6).

=== Born in the 1730s ===
- Tommaso Giordani (1730–1806): 10 string quartets.
- Antonín Kammel (1730–1784/5): Czech composer who wrote at least two string quartets
- Antonio Sacchini (1730–1786): Six string quartets Op. 2 (1778)
- Christian Cannabich (1731–1798): Six string quartets Op. 5 (about 1780)
- Joseph Haydn (1732–1809): Wrote sixty-eight string quartets (some of which he called Divertimenti), the last incomplete, plus Die Sieben letzten Worte unseres Erlösers am Kreuze (The Seven Last Words of Christ on the Cross), a sequence of eight slow movements plus a brief, rapid finale (originally written for orchestra, but probably better known in its version for string quartet). He also arranged a set of six preludes and fugues by Gregor Werner for string quartet.
  - List of string quartets by Joseph Haydn
- Thomas Erskine (1732–1781): Nine string quartets
- François-Joseph Gossec (1734–1829): Twelve string quartets: Op. 14 (1770) and Op. 15 (1772).
- Johann Christian Bach (1735–1782): three quartets (1776)
- Johann Georg Albrechtsberger (1736–1809): 73 string quartets (called Divertimenti during 1760s and Sonate during 1780s and after), Op. 7 (1787), Op. 20 6 quartetti con fughe per diversi stromenti (1800)
- Josef Mysliveček (1737–1781): 18 string quartets: Op. 3 (1768), Op. 1 (1777), and Op. Post (1781).
- Vincenzo Manfredini (1737–1799): Six string quartets (about 1780)
- Michael Haydn (1737–1806): 19 string quartets.
- Pierre Vachon (1738–1803): About 30 string quartets including Six Quartettos for two violins, a Tenor and Bass Op. 5 (c. 1775) and Six Quatuors Concertans pour deux Violons, Alto et Basse Op. 11 (1782).
- Johann Baptist Wanhal (1739–1813): Over seventy string quartets.
- Carl Ditters von Dittersdorf (1739–1799): Composed 13 string quartets and published 12. He also composed several trios and quintets.

=== Born in the 1740s ===
- Anton Ferdinand Tietz (1742-1811): 16 string quartets.
- Ernst Eichner (1740–1777): In addition to flute quartets he wrote a set of six quartets, not for the usual instrument combination of 2 violins, viola, and cello, but for violin, viola, cello and double bass: Sechs Quartette (6 Quartets) Op. 12 (published 1776–77).
- Giovanni Paisiello (1740–1816): Nine string quartets.
- Henri-Joseph Rigel (1741–1799): Six string quartets.
- Anton Zimmermann (1741–1781): Silesian-born composer who wrote six string quartets Op. 3 (c.1775).
- Václav Pichl (1741–1805): Wrote over thirty quartets; he was one of the founders of the Vienna Violin School.
- Antoine-Laurent Baudron (1742–1834): Amongst the first French composers to write string quartets, his Sei quartetti Op. 3 were published in 1768.
- Roman Hoffstetter (1742–1815): An Austrian monk and composer, now supposed to have composed the six string quartets known as Haydn's Op. 3, including the well-known 'Serenade Quartet'.
- Luigi Boccherini (1743–1805): A prolific composer in most chamber music genres, Boccherini wrote 91 string quartets—he also wrote 125 string quintets.
  - List of string quartets by Luigi Boccherini
- Gaetano Brunetti (1744–1798): Italian composer active in the Madrid area, wrote at least 50 string quartets, but also 47 trios, 65 quintets and 12 sextets
- Joseph Bologne, Chevalier de Saint-Georges (1745–1799): Eighteen quartets published in three sets comprising: Six quartets Op. 1, Six quartetto concertans "Au gout du jour" (1779) and Six quartetto concertans Op. 14 (1785).
- Maddalena Laura Sirmen (1745–1818): Six String quartets, published 1771.
- Giuseppe Cambini (1746–1825): Wrote 149 string quartets and 30 quartets d'airs variés (many of which also exist in versions with winds). Alfred Einstein suggests that Mozart's fourth flute quartet, in his opinion a satirical work, may have been in part a comment on their popularity.
- Leopold Koželuch (1747–1818): Six string quartets.
- Emanuel Aloys Förster (1748–1823): Six string quartets Op. 7 (c. 1794), six string quartets Op. 16 (c. 1798), three string quartets Op. 21 (1802).
- William Shield (1748–1829): six string quartets (1782)

=== Born in the 1750s ===
- Antonio Rosetti (c. 1750 – 1792): Eleven string quartets.
- Bartolomeo Campagnoli (1751–1827): Six string quartets.
- John Marsh (1752–1828): String Quartet in B♭ major (only surviving quartet).
- Franz Anton Hoffmeister (1754–1812): Fifty string quartets (plus seven for violin, two violas and cello) (source: Grove online).
- Peter Winter (1754–1825): At least eight string quartets.
- Giovanni Battista Viotti (1755–1824): Fifteen string quartets.
- Franz Grill (1756?–1792): Nine string quartets.
- Wolfgang Amadeus Mozart (1756–1791): Twenty-three string quartets, including the six so-called Haydn Quartets (1782–1785), generally reckoned to be his best, the Hoffmeister Quartet (1786), and the Prussian Quartets (1789–1790).
- Joseph Martin Kraus (1756–1792): Ten string quartets. See also his Flute quintet in D major.
- Paul Wranitzky (1756–1808): Wrote seventy-three string quartets which, at their best (the six quartets of Op. 16, the six of Op. 23), are second only to Haydn and the mature Mozart in quality.
- Ignace Pleyel (1757–1831): Student of Haydn, wrote 70 string quartets.
- Alessandro Rolla (1757–1841): Ten string quartets: three as Op. 2, three as Op. 5, and four others (source: Grove).
- Charles Wesley junior (1757–1834): 6 Quartettos, published in 1779.
- Franz Krommer / František Kramář (1759–1831): Approximately 100 string quartets, many of which were very popular in early 19th century Vienna, and were compared positively to Beethoven's quartets.

=== Born in the 1760s ===
- Luigi Cherubini (1760–1842): Six string quartets (1814–1837).
- Jan Ladislav Dussek (1760–1812): Published three string quartets, Op. 60.
- Antonín Vranický / Anton Wranitzky (1761–1820): Thirty quartets. A founder of the Vienna "violin school" and major virtuoso, he was the teacher of Ignaz Schuppanzigh and leader of the Lobkowitz orchestra.
- Adalbert Gyrowetz / Vojtěch Matyáš Jírovec (1763–1850): Friend of Mozart, wrote at least forty-two string quartets (Grove), possibly more than fifty (Hyperion CD notes).
- Paul Alday (c. 1763 – 1835): Three string quartets (B♭ major, A major, C minor) (London & Oxford, c.1795)
- Joseph Leopold Eybler (1765–1846): Friend of Mozart, a pupil of Albrechtsberger (who declared him to be the greatest musical genius in Vienna apart from Mozart) and a protégé of Joseph Haydn. Three string quartets, Op. 1, available on CD, written at the age of 22 in 1787 (published in 1794).
- Rodolphe Kreutzer (1766–1831): Fifteen string quartets.
- Samuel Wesley (1766–1837): At least one quartet (in E♭ major, written around 1810).
- Bernhard Romberg (1767–1841): Eleven complete string quartets, two sets of three quartets each Op. 1 & 25, and single quartets Opp. 12, 37, 39, 59, 60.
- Andreas Romberg (1767–1821): Twenty-nine complete string quartets: Three quartets each in Opp. 1, 2, 5, 7, 16, 30, 53, 59 and 76; a single quartet, Op. 40, and a quatuor brilliant, Op. 11. He also wrote three rondos for string quartet, Op. 34.
- Johannes Spech (1767–1836): Nine string quartets.
- Louis-Emmanuel Jadin (1768–1853): Six string quartets.
- Józef Elsner (1769–1854): At least three string quartets.

=== Born in the 1770s ===
- Ludwig van Beethoven (1770–1827): Sixteen quartets, widely regarded as the finest quartets ever composed. The Große Fuge was originally composed as the last movement of Op. 130, but was subsequently published as a separate work.
- Peter Hänsel (1770–1831): At least forty-nine quartets.
- Anton Reicha (1770–1836): At least thirty-seven string quartets (14 of them newly discovered), of which the eight Vienna quartets (1801–1806) are the most important. Though largely ignored since Reicha's lifetime, they were highly influential works. Groups in Europe have begun programming Reicha's quartets, and the first modern editions and first recordings are now in the works.
- Georg Abraham Schneider (1770–1839): At least twelve quartets, three each in Op. 10, 20, 65 and 68.
- Pierre Baillot (1771–1842): Three string quartets.
- Antonio Casimir Cartellieri (1772–1807): Three string quartets.
- Joseph Wölfl (1773–1812): An Austrian student of Michael Haydn and Leopold Mozart and a rival of Beethoven composed at least 13 string quartets including three quartets Op. 4, three quartets Op. 30 and six quartets Op. 51.
- Pierre Rode (1774–1830): Eight string quartets.
- Hyacinthe Jadin (1776–1800): Twelve string quartets in four opera, Opp. 1, 2, 3, 4, all in four movements except Op. 4, No. 1. Modeled on Haydn & Mozart; pre-romantic.
- Joseph Küffner (1776–1856): At least five string quartets (Op. 41 nos. 1–3, Op. 52, Op. 178).
- Johann Nepomuk Hummel (1778–1837): Three string quartets, Op. 30, No. 1 in C major; Op. 30, No. 2 in G major and Op. 30, No. 3 in E♭ major (all c. 1808).
- Joachim Nicolas Eggert (1779–1813): Swedish composer who composed at least twelve string quartets including: Three quartets Op. 1 (c. 1807), three quartets Op. 2 (c. 1810) and three quartets Op. 3.

=== Born in the 1780s ===
- Niccolò Paganini (1782–1840): Fifteen string quartets for violin, viola, guitar and cello, as well as three traditional string quartets.
- George Onslow (1784–1853): Thirty-six quartets were written between 1810 and 1845.
- Ferdinand Ries (1784–1838): Twenty-six string quartets including: Three quartets Op. 70 (1812, 1815) and String Quartet in F minor, WoO. 48 (1833–1835).
- Louis Spohr (1784–1859): Known as Ludwig in his native Germany, Spohr wrote thirty-six string quartets and four double quartets (for two string quartets).
  - List of string quartets by Louis Spohr
- Henry Bishop (1786–1855): String Quartet in C minor (1816)
- Carl Eberwein (1786–1868): At least one string quartet, Op. 4, in A major.
- Friedrich Schneider (1786–1853): Ten string quartets.
- Alexander Alyabyev (1787–1851): At least two string quartets, plus one incomplete.
- Franz Xaver Gebel (1787–1843): At least three string quartets.
- Friedrich Ernst Fesca (1789–1826): Published sixteen string quartets.

=== Born in the 1790s ===
- Georg Gerson (1790–1825): Five string quartets.
- Carl Czerny (1791–1857): Wrote at least 20 and as many as 40 string quartets, most never published, existing in manuscript form only. Several have seen recent recordings.
- Ferdinand Hérold (1791–1833): Three string quartets.
- Cipriani Potter (1792–1871): String Quartet in G Major (1837)
- Anselm Hüttenbrenner (1794–1868): Wrote two string quartets (E major 1816, C minor 1847)
- Franz Berwald (1796–1868): Swedish composer, wrote three string quartets, No. 1 in G minor (1818), No. 2 in A minor (1849), and No. 3 in E♭ major (1849).
- Carl Loewe (1796–1869): Four string quartets.
- Gaetano Donizetti (1797–1848): much better known for his operas, Donizetti also wrote eighteen string quartets, the first sixteen between 1817 and 1821 (mostly 'scholastic works', though the fifth is his most performed), the seventeenth in 1825 and the last in 1836.
- Franz Schubert (1797–1828): Traditionally reckoned to have written fifteen string quartets. The Quartettsatz, Death and the Maiden and Rosamunde quartets are particularly well known.
- Carl Gottlieb Reissiger (1798–1859): Seven string quartets.

== Born in the 19th century ==
=== Born in the 1800s ===
- Johannes Bernardus van Bree (1801–1857): Three string quartets.
- Jan Kalivoda (1801–1866): Three string quartets.
- John Lodge Ellerton (1801–1873): Some 100 string quartets (many unpublished).
- Bernhard Molique (1802–1869): As many as 13 string quartets.
- Charles Hommann (1803–1872?): Three string quartets (by 1855)
- Franz Lachner (1803–1890): at least six quartets (No. 1 in B minor, Op. 75, No. 2 in A major, Op. 76, No. 4 in D minor, Op. 120, No. 5 in G major, Op. 169, No. 6 in E minor, Op. 173).
- Mikhail Glinka (1804–1857): String Quartet in F major (1830). After attempting to compose a quartet in 1824 (a work that remained incomplete), Glinka wrote his only finished string quartet in 1830. While this piece is now seldom performed, this and its incomplete predecessor are notable as among the first attempts by a native Russian composer to work in this genre.
- Fanny Hensel (1805–1847): String quartet in E♭ major (1834).
- Johan Peter Emilius Hartmann (1805–1900): Three string quartets.
- Juan Crisóstomo Arriaga (1806–1826): Early 19th-century Spanish composer, born on Mozart's 50th birthday. Wrote three brilliant quartets (c. 1824) before his abrupt death at age 19; No. 1 in D minor; No. 2 in A major; No. 3 in E♭ major.
- Václav Jindřich Veit (1806–1864): Early Romantic Czech composer, a major influence on Smetana, wrote four string quartets and five string quintets.
- Ignaz Lachner (1807–1895): Eight quartets (Op. 43 in F; Op. 54 in C; Op. 74 in A; Op. 104 in G; Op. 105 in A minor; Op. 106 in C for 3 violins and viola; Op. 107 in G for four violins; in B♭ Op. posth.)
- Charles Lucas (1808–1869): String Quartet in G Major (1827)
- Felix Mendelssohn (1809–1847): Six numbered string quartets: Op. 12 (1829), Op. 13 (1827), Op. 44 (three quartets, 1838), and Op. 80 (1847); an early unnumbered string quartet in E♭ major (1823); Four Pieces (Andante, Scherzo, Capriccio, Fugue) for string quartet, Op. 81 (1847); a set of 12 fugues for string quartet, written when Mendelssohn was twelve.

=== Born in the 1810s ===
- Norbert Burgmüller (1810–1836): Four string quartets: Op. 4 in D minor, Op. 7 in D minor, Op. 9 in A♭ major, and Op. 14 in A minor.
- Félicien David (1810–1876): Four string quartets: One published in 1868, another three unpublished.
- Ferdinand David (1810–1863): One string quartet in A major, Op. 32.
- Robert Schumann (1810–1856): Wrote three string quartets (Op. 41), not among his better-known works.
- Wilhelm Taubert (1811–1891): At least four string quartets (1848? to 1872?).
- Emilie Mayer (1812–1883): Seven string quartets (G minor Op. 14, F major, D minor, E minor, G major, B♭ major, A major), of which only the G minor one was published in her lifetime.
- George Alexander Macfarren (1813–1887): Six string quartets.
- Jakob Rosenhain (1813–1894): Three string quartets (Op. 55 in G, Op. 57 in C, Op. 65 in D minor, published by Richault of Paris in 1864; his Am Abend variations for strings Op. 99 has been called in at least one source his 4th string quartet).
- Giuseppe Verdi (1813–1901): One string quartet, in E minor (1873).
- Josephine Lang (1815–1880): Menuetto [und Trio] für Streichquartett (C major); incomplete quartet in F major. All unpublished.
- Robert Volkmann (1815–1883): Six string quartets.
- Johannes Verhulst (1816–1891): Three string quartets.
- Salvatore Pappalardo (1817–1884): Four published quartets and several in manuscript.
- Niels Gade (1817–1890): One published quartet (D major, Op. 63) and suppressed quartets in F major, F minor and E minor.
- Antonio Bazzini (1818–1897): Six string quartets.
- Charles Gounod (1818–1893): At least four string quartets: D major, A major, F major, and A minor. The A minor quartet was published in 1893 as his third and received performance in Gounod's lifetime; the remaining three quartets were discovered in manuscript form in 1993.
- Stanisław Moniuszko (1819–1872): Two string quartets (in D minor, F major).

=== Born in the 1820s ===
- Henri Vieuxtemps (1820–1881): Three string quartets (in E minor, Op. 44, in C major, Op. 51, in B♭, Op. 52—the latter two published posthumously).
- Friedrich Kiel (1821–1885): Two string quartets (Op. 53, in A minor and E♭) and waltzes Op.73 and Op. 78.
- Joachim Raff (1822–1882): Nine string quartets, the first (1850) lost/destroyed (the other eight between 1855 and 1874); the last three (all from 1874) share an opus number and were also called suites by the composer.
- César Franck (1822–1890): One string quartet (1889).
- Édouard Lalo (1823–1892): One string quartet, in E♭ major (originally composed in 1855 as Op. 19 but revised in 1884 as Op. 45).
- Bedřich Smetana (1824–1884): Two string quartets, No. 1 in E minor From my Life; and No. 2 in D minor, with the first being the better known.
- Anton Bruckner (1824–1896): One string quartet (1862).
- Carl Reinecke (1824–1910): Five string quartets (Op. 16 in E♭ in 1842, Op. 30 in F around 1851, Op. 132 in C around 1874, Op. 211 in D, Op. 287 in G minor).
- Kate Loder (1825–1904): Two string quartets (in G minor, 1846, and E minor, 1848).
- Edward Mollenhauer (1827–1914): United States violinist and composer born in Prussia: his best-known compositions were quartets; he also wrote three operas.
- Woldemar Bargiel (1828–1897): Four string quartets (including No. 3, Op. 15b in A minor and No. 4, Op. 47 in D minor).
- Anton Rubinstein (1829–1894): Ten string quartets.

=== Born in the 1830s ===
- Karl Goldmark (1830–1915): Goldmark's only string quartet (String Quartet in B♭ major, Op.8, 1860) was his breakthrough work, his first composition to receive very positive reviews in contemporary Viennese musical journals. Long neglected, it was recorded several times in the 1990s as part of a general revival of interest in Goldmark's chamber music.
- Peter Arnold Heise (1830–1879): Ca. 6 string quartets: No. 1 in B minor (1852?), No. 2 in G major (1852), No. 3 in B♭ major, No. 4 in C minor (1857?), A major (1857?), g minor (1857?).
- Salomon Jadassohn (1831–1902): One string quartet, in C minor, Op. 10 (1858).
- Ludwig Norman (1831–1885): At least five string quartets.
- Johann Joseph Abert (1832–1915): String Quartet in A, dedicated to Karl Eckert (1862).
- Alexander Borodin (1833–1887): Two string quartets: No. 1 in A (1879) and No. 2 in D (1881)
- Johannes Brahms (1833–1897): Three string quartets, the first two in 1873 and the final one in 1875.
- Ernst Naumann (1833–1910): At least one quartet, Op. 9.
- Felix Otto Dessoff (1835–1892): Two string Quartets, Op. 7 and Op. 11.
- Felix Draeseke (1835–1913): Three string quartets between 1880 and 1895.
- Camille Saint-Saëns (1835–1921): Two string quartets: Op. 112 (1889) and Op. 153 (1918).
- Józef Wieniawski (1837–1912): At least one quartet, in A minor, Op. 32.
- Max Bruch (1838–1920): Two string quartets, from his student days or a little after, Op. 9 in C minor (1858–59) and Op. 10 in E major (1860).
- Ernst Eduard Taubert (1838–1934): At least four string quartets (1877 to 1902).
- Josef Rheinberger (1839–1901): Two string quartets, in C minor, Op. 89 and F major, Op. 147.
- Friedrich Gernsheim (1839–1916): Five string quartets (No. 1 in C minor, Op. 25 (perf. 1871); No. 2 in A minor, Op. 31 (perf. 1874); No. 3 in F major, Op. 51 (1886); No. 4 in E minor, Op. 66 (perf. 1900); No. 5 in A major, Op. 83 (c. 1911)).
- Louise Haenel de Cronenthall (1839–1896): One quartet, Cremonese.
- Alice Mary Smith (1839–1884): Three string quartets (No. 1 in D major, 1862; No. 2 in A Minor, 1872; No. 3, Tubal-Cain).

=== Born in the 1840s ===
- Hermann Goetz (1840–1876): One string quartet in B♭ (1865–66).
- Pyotr Ilyich Tchaikovsky (1840–1893): Three string quartets: No. 1 in D, Op. 11 (1871); No. 2 in F, Op. 22 (1873); and No. 3 in E♭ minor, Op. 30 (1876), of which the first is the best-known, especially the Andante cantabile second movement which has been recorded many times with full string orchestra. There is also a quartet movement in B♭ major from 1865.
- Johan Svendsen (1840–1911): One string quartet, his Op. 1.
- Antonín Dvořák (1841–1904): Fourteen string quartets, out of which number twelve, the American, is the best known.
- Giovanni Sgambati (1841–1914): Two string quartets, one in D minor (1864), and one in D♭ major, his Op. 17 (1882).
- Elfrida Andrée (1841–1929): One string quartet in D minor and another in A major (published in 2000).
- Mykola Lysenko (1842–1912): One string quartet in D minor (1869).
- Heinrich von Herzogenberg (1843–1900): Wrote five string quartets (1876–1890).
- Edvard Grieg (1843–1907): Two string quartets, the second being unfinished.
- Ján Levoslav Bella (1843–1936): Three string quartets, in E minor (1871), C minor (1880) and B♭ minor (1887).
- Georg Wilhelm Rauchenecker (1844–1906): Six string quartets.
- Nikolai Rimsky-Korsakov (1844–1908): Better known for his orchestral suites, he also wrote three complete string quartets, two single movements and three other pieces for string quartet.
- Clara Kathleen Rogers (1844–1931): Two string quartets, among them String quartet in D minor, Op. 5.
- Gabriel Fauré (1845–1924): One string quartet, in E minor, Op. 121 (1924).
- Ika Peyron (1845–1922): Humoresk in g minor for string quartet and a string quartet in three movements (1897).
- Fidelis Zitterbart (1845–1915): 125 string quartets.
- Marie Jaëll (1846–1925): One string quartet (1875).
- Agnes Tyrrell (1846–1883): String Quartet in G major.
- Augusta Holmès (1847–1903): Minuetto for String Quartet (1867).
- August Klughardt (1847–1902): Two string quartets (in F, Op. 42 and in D, Op. 61).
- Robert Fuchs (1847–1927): Four string quartets: No. 1 in E, Op. 58 (1895); No. 2 in A minor, Op. 62 (1899); No. 3 in C, Op. 71 (1903); No. 4 in A, Op. 106 (1916) (Austrian National Library claims to have a late 5th quartet and several in manuscript predating No. 1).
- Alexander Mackenzie (1847–1935): One string quartet in G (1868).
- Hubert Parry (1848–1918): Three string quartets (unpublished during his lifetime).
- Wilhelm Fitzenhagen (1848–1890): One string quartet, in D minor, Op. 23 (c. 1870).
- Benjamin Godard (1849–1895): Three string quartets.
- Felicia Tuczek (1849–1905): At least one string quartet, in F minor (published in 1904).

=== Born in the 1850s ===
- Fernand de la Tombelle (1854-1928): 1 string quartet.
- Tomas Breton (1850-1923): Three string quartets.
- Zdeněk Fibich (1850–1900): Two string quartets (A major, 1874, G major, 1878) and a set of variations for quartet (B♭, 1883) according to Orfeo CD label.
- Alexander Taneyev (1850–1918): Three string quartets: No. 1 in G major, Op. 25; No. 2 in C major, Op. 28; and No. 3 in A major, Op. 30. (source: Olympia CD notes)
- Antonio Scontrino (1850–1922): Four string quartets (A minor, G minor, F major, C major) and a movement (prelude and fugue in E minor) for string quartet.
- Vincent d'Indy (1851–1931): Three string quartets.
- Charles Villiers Stanford (1852–1924): Eight string quartets (1891–1919); No 1, op 44 (1891), No 2, op 45 (1891), No 3, op 64 (1897), No 4, op 99 (1897), No 5, op 104 (1907), No 6, op 122 (1910), No 7, op 166 (1919), No 8, op 167 (1919)
- Teresa Carreño (1853–1917): String Quartet in B Minor (1896).
- Amanda Röntgen-Maier (1853-1894): String Quartet in A major (1877).
- Leoš Janáček (1854–1928): Two string quartets, known as The Kreutzer Sonata and Intimate Letters.
- Ernest Chausson (1855–1899): One string quartet in three movements; the third movement was completed by Vincent d'Indy after Chausson's death in 1899.
- Christian Sinding (1856–1941): String quartet, his Op. 70.
- Sergei Ivanovich Taneyev (1856–1915): Nine complete string quartets, two partial. (source: Grove Music Online)
- Edward Elgar (1857–1934): One string quartet in E minor, Op. 83 (1918).
- Rosalind Ellicott (1857–1924): At least one string quartet in B♭ major.
- Sylvio Lazzari (1857–1944): String quartet in A minor, Op. 17.
- Giacomo Puccini (1858–1924): An elegy for string quartet, Crisantemi ("Chrysanthemums"), that he wrote in 1890.
- Hilda Sehested (1858–1936): String Quartet in G-major (1911).
- Ethel Smyth (1858–1944): One published string quartet, in E minor (1902–1912) and one unpublished, dating from her student days in Leipzig, in C minor.
- Hans Rott (1858–1884): at least one complete quartet, in C minor (1876).
- Josef Bohuslav Foerster (1859–1951): Five string quartets (1888–1951; the fifth incomplete at his death).
- Vincenza Garelli della Morea (1859–1924): One string quartet.
- Susan Frances Harrison (1859–1935): Quartet on ancient Irish airs.
- Mikhail Ippolitov-Ivanov (1859–1935): At least one string quartet, Op. 13 in A minor.
- Anna Severine Lindeman (1859–1938): One string quartet in G minor.
- Ida Moberg (1859–1947): One string quartet (around 1903, lost).
- Nikolay Sokolov (1859–1922): Three string quartets (in F major Op. 7, in A major Op. 14 and in D minor, Op. 20, published 1890, 1892 and 1894) and contributed to projects of the Belyayev circle with Nikolai Rimsky-Korsakov, Alexander Glazunov, Alexander Kopylov and others (including a polka for Les Vendredis for string quartet and other works).

=== Born in the 1860s ===
- Valborg Aulin (1860–1928): Two string quartets, No. 1 in F major (1884), No. 2 in E minor, Op. 17 (1889).
- Emil von Reznicek (1860–1945): Four string quartets, including No. 1 in C♯ minor (1921), also in D minor; pub. Birnbach, 1923, Berlin) and B♭ major (pub. Bimbach, 1932), quartet in C minor (published by E.W. Fritzsch, Leipzig, 1883). (Also fragments, early quartets, alternate versions? The situation is clarified somewhat in the article and some of the manuscripts are now being published).
- Alicia Van Buren (1860–1922): One string quartet.
- Hugo Wolf (1860–1903): One string quartet (1884) and a more famous Italian Serenade for string quartet (1892); also, an Intermezzo.
- Anton Arensky (1861–1906): Two string quartets, No. 1 (Op. 11) and No. 2 (Op. 35), the latter for violin, viola and two cellos and including the Variations on a Theme of Tchaikovsky, also arranged for string orchestra.
- Charles Martin Loeffler (1861–1935): Two string quartets, in A minor (1889), and Music for Four Stringed Instruments (1917).
- Dora Bright (1862–1951): Air and Variations for String Quartet (1888).
- Claude Debussy (1862–1918): One string quartet, in G minor, Op. 10 (1893).
- Frederick Delius (1862–1934): Three string quartets (1888, 1893 and 1916).
- Friedrich Klose (1862–1942): One string quartet ("Ein Tribut in vier Raten entrichtet an Seine Gestrengen den deutschen Schulmeister"), in E♭ major (1911).
- Mona McBurney (1862–1932): String Quartette in G Minor.
- Edith Swepstone (1862–1942): String Quartet in g minor, Lyrical Cycle for String Quartet.
- Karel Kovařovic (1862–1920): Three string quartets.
- Felix Blumenfeld (1863–1931): One string quartet, Op. 26 in F Major (1898).
- Emánuel Moór (1863–1931): Two string quartets, Op. 59 in A and Op. 87, and other works for string quartet
- Hugo Kaun (1863–1932): Four string quartets (in F major, Op. 40, pub. 1898; in D minor, Op. 41, pub. 1899; in C minor, Op. 74, pub. 1907; in A minor, Op. 114, pub. 1921).
- Cornélie van Oosterzee (1863–1943): One string quartet (c. 1888).
- Felix Weingartner (1863–1942): Five string quartets (in D minor, Op. 24, in F minor, Op. 26, in F, Op. 34, in D, Op. 62, and in E♭, Op. 81, pub. 1899, 1900, 1903, 1918 and ?).
- Eugen d'Albert (1864–1932): Two string quartets (in A minor, Op. 7 and in E♭, Op. 11, 1887 and 1893).
- Alexander Gretchaninov (1864–1956): Four string quartets: No. 1 in G major, Op. 2 (1894); No. 2 in D minor, Op. 70 (1913); No. 3 in C minor, Op. 75 (1915); No. 4 in F major, Op. 124 (1929).
- Alberto Nepomuceno (1864–1920): Three string quartets.
- Guy Ropartz (1864–1955): Six quartets (1893–1951).
- Richard Strauss (1864–1949): One string quartet.
- Gustav Jenner (1865–1920): Three string quartets (1907, 1910 and 1911).
- Alexander Glazunov (1865–1936): Seven string quartets, and numerous other compositions for string quartet (the Five Pieces of 1879–1881, the Five Novelettes Op. 15, the Finale of the B-la-F Quartet and the first movement Carol-singers of the Name-day Quartet, the Suite Op. 35, the Two Pieces of 1902, and the Elegy for Belyayev Op. 105). The Third Quartet (1888) is often nicknamed the Slav Quartet, while the Seventh Quartet (1930) is subtitled "Homage to the Past".
- Robert Kahn (1865–1951): Two string quartets: In A major, Op. 8, and in A minor, Op. 60 (published in 1890 and 1914 respectively).
- Albéric Magnard (1865–1914): One string quartet (Op. 16, 1903).
- Carl Nielsen (1865–1931): Four published string quartets, also an early quartet and quartet movements.
- Jean Sibelius (1865–1957): Four unnumbered string quartets: three from his student years (E♭ major, JS 184, 1885; A minor, JS 183, 1889; and, B♭ major, Op. 4, 1890) and one, Voces intimae (D minor, Op. 56, 1909), from his mature period. Numerous individual pieces for quartet, including Adagio (D minor, JS 12, 1890) and Andante festivo (JS 34a, 1922), are also extant.
- Ferruccio Busoni (1866–1924): Two string quartets, Op. 19 in C minor (1884) and Op. 26 in D minor (1887).
- Swan Hennessy (1866–1929): Four numbered string quartets (No. 1, Op. 46 [1912]; No. 2, Op. 49 [1920]; No. 3, Op. 61 [1926]; No. 4, Op. 75 [1930]); a Sérénade Op. 65 (1925) for string quartet; and a version for soprano and string quartet (1928) of the Trois Chansons espagnoles Op. 42b (originally with piano, 1921).
- Charles Wood (1866–1926): Eight string quartets (1885, 1893, 1912, 1912, 1915, 1916, 1917, and Variations on an Irish Folk Song, 1917), collectively published by Oxford University Press in 1929.
- Amy Beach (1867–1944): One quartet, String Quartet in One Movement, Op. 89 (1921).
- Fini Henriques (1867–1940): Three string quartets (1883, 1890, 1898).
- Charles Koechlin (1867–1950): Three string quartets, in D major Op. 51 (1911–13), Op. 57 (1911–16), Op. 72 (1917–21).
- Ewald Straesser (1867–1933): Five string quartets (publication dates 1901, 1901, 1913, 1920, 1927).
- John Blackwood McEwen (1868–1948): Seventeen numbered string quartets; No 1 (1893), No 2 (1891), No 3 (1901), No 4 (1905), No 5 and 6 (1912), No 7 (1916), No 8 (1918), No 9 and 10 (1920), No 11 (1921), No 12 (1923), No 13 (1928), No 14, 15 and 16 (1936), No 17 (1947), plus two unnumbered (1890s)
- Max von Schillings (1868–1933): String quartet in E minor (about 1887).
- Albert Roussel (1869–1937): One string quartet (in D major, his Op. 45, 1931–1932).
- Hans Pfitzner (1869–1949): Four string quartets (in D minor, without Op. number, 1886; D major, Op. 13 1903, C♯ minor, Op. 36 from 1925 – later arranged into a symphony, and C minor, Op. 50, 1942).

=== Born in the 1870s ===
- Alfred Hill (1870–1960): Australian composer, wrote seventeen string quartets.
- Julia Klumpke (1870–1961): Allegretto for 2 violins, viola and cello; Rondo for String Quartet; String Quartet – I, II, III(Dirge), IV; Petite Suite for String Quartet in 5 movements.
- Vítězslav Novák (1870–1949): Three quartets (1899–1938).
- Joseph Ryelandt (1870–1965): Four string quartets (1897–1943).
- Florent Schmitt (1870–1958): String Quartet in G, Op. 112 (1947).
- Louis Vierne (1870–1937): One string quartet (1894)
- Henry Kimball Hadley (1871–1937): Two string quartets: No. 1 in A, Op. 24, and No. 2, Op. 132 (1932).
- Wilhelm Stenhammar (1871–1927): Swedish composer, wrote seven string quartets (but withdrew one quartet, in F minor), and arranged other works for quartet.
- Alexander von Zemlinsky (1871–1942) Four string quartets and two movements for string quartet: No. 1 in A major, Op. 4 (1896); No. 2, Op. 15 (1913–15); No. 3, Op. 19 (1924); No. 4 (Suite), Op. 25 (1936); and two movements for string quartet (1927).
- Arthur Farwell (1872–1952): Fugue Fantasy for String Quartet, Op. 44 (1914), String Quartet, Op. 65, The Hako (1922).
- Paul Juon (1872–1940): Four string quartets: A youthful Op. 5 and three acknowledged quartets Op. 11 in B minor, Op. 29 in A minor and Op. 67 in C major.
- Ralph Vaughan Williams (1872–1958): Two numbered string quartets: No. 1 in G minor (1908, rev. 1921) and No. 2 in A minor (1942/3). Also one student work in C minor (1897)
- Eliza Woods (1872–1961): One string quartet.
- Mary Carr Moore (1873–1957): Two string quartets, No. 1 in G minor, 1926, and No. 2 in F minor, 1930.
- Sergei Rachmaninoff (1873–1943): Two early quartets, both never finished: No. 1 (c. 1890) and No. 2 (c. 1896).
- Max Reger (1873–1916): Six string quartets (including an early posthumously-published work with an optional part for double bass).
- David Vaughan Thomas (1873–1934): Two string quartets (1929 and 1930), both unpublished.
- Katharine Emily Eggar (1874–1961): One string quartet (1931).
- Reynaldo Hahn (1874–1947): At least two string quartets (A minor from 1939, F major from 1943).
- Charles Ives (1874–1954): Two string quartets (1896 and 1913), the first entitled From the Salvation Army.
- Arnold Schoenberg (1874–1951): Four numbered string quartets, the second of which includes a part for soprano. Also composed an early, unnumbered, string quartet.
- Franz Schmidt (1874–1939): Quartet No. 1 in A major (1925), Quartet No. 2 in G major (1929).
- Josef Suk (1874–1935): Two string quartets—in B♭, Op. 11 from 1896, and Op. 31 in one movement from 1911, tonal but from G minor -> D♭. Also the Meditation on the Old Czech Chorale St. Wenceslas, Op. 35a, 1914.
- Franco Alfano (1875–1954): Three string quartets.
- Reinhold Glière (1875–1956): Four string quartets: In A major, Op. 2 (1899), in G minor, Op. 20 (1905), in D minor, Op. 67 (1927), in F minor, Op. 83 (1943).
- Fritz Kreisler (1875–1962): String quartet in A minor (1919).
- Erkki Melartin (1875–1937): Four quartets, in E minor (1896), G minor (1900), E♭ major (1902) and in F major (1910).
- Maurice Ravel (1875–1937): One string quartet, in F major (1903).
- Vilma von Webenau (1875–1953): Three string quartets (1891, 1892, 1893), also Sommerlieder für Streichquartett und eine Sprechstimme.
- Richard Wetz (1875–1935): Two string quartets: in F minor, Op. 43, in E minor, Op. 49.
- Samuel Coleridge-Taylor (1875–1912): 5 Fantasiestücke for String Quartet (1895).
- Mabel Wheeler Daniels (1877–1971): Observations: 4 strings (1945).
- Gustave Samazeuilh: One string quartet (1900).
- Ernst von Dohnányi (1877–1960): Three string quartets (1899, 1906, 1926).
- Jeanne Beijerman-Walraven (1878–1969): One string quartet (1912).
- Fritz Brun (1878–1959): Four string quartets: No. 1 in E♭ major (1898); No. 2 in G major (1921); No. 3 in F major (1943); No. 4 in D major (1949).
- Lucien Durosoir (1878–1955): Three string quartets (1920, 1922, 1933–34).
- Joseph Holbrooke (1878–1958): Six string quartets (No. 1 Op. 17b Fantasie-Quartet (1904, pub.1922), No. 2 War Impressions Op. 58a pub. 1915, No. 3 Pickwick Club Op. 68 pub. 1916, No. 4 Folksong Suite Op. 71 c. 1916, No. 5 Folksong Suite No. 2 Op. 72 c. 1917, No. 6 Folksong Suite No. 3 Op.73 c. 1918) and a further Suite No. 1 Cambria Op. 101.
- Johanna Müller-Hermann (1878–1941): String Quartet in E♭ major, Op. 6.
- Frank Bridge (1879–1941): Five string quartets: B♭ major (1901); No. 1 in E minor ('Bologna') (1906); No. 2 in G minor (1915); No. 3 (1926); No. 4 (1937), plus a host of other, shorter pieces.
- Jean Cras (1879–1932): One string quartet (1909).
- John Ireland (1879–1962): Two string quartets: D minor (1895–1897?, scholarship work, RCM) and C minor (1897?, composed as a student work at the R.C.M.), both published only c. 1973.
- Ottorino Respighi (1879–1936): Seven or eight string quartets or works for quartet (one with unusual instrumentation): D major (1898), Cortège (1898), B♭ major (1898), D♭ major (1903) (incomplete?), D major (1904), in D major for quinton, viola d’amore, viola da gamba, viola da basso (1904), D minor (1909) and Quartetto Dorico (1924).
- Johanna Senfter (1879–1961): Five string quartets (in D minor, Op. 4; in F♯ Minor, Op. 28; in F Minor, Op. 46; in B♭ Major, Op. 64; in C Minor, Op. 115) and Variations for String Quartet in D♭ Major, Op. 63.
- Jacob Weinberg (1879–1956): String Quartet, Opus 55 (recording available on Naxos Label, recorded by Milken Archive. See Wikipedia, "Jacob Weinberg").

=== Born in the 1880s ===
- Susan Spain-Dunk (1880–1962): String Quartet in B♭ major (1914) and Phantasy for String Quartet (1915).
- Ernest Bloch (1880–1959): Six string quartets (in G (1896) and five numbered quartets – 1916, 1945, 1952, 1953, 1956; individual shorter works e.g. In the Mountains (1924), Prelude (1925), Night (1923), 2 Pieces (1938, 1950), Paysages (1923)).
- Joseph-Ermend Bonnal (1880–1944): Two string quartets (1927? and 1934)
- Ildebrando Pizzetti (1880–1968): Two string quartets in A major (1906) and D major (1932–33).
- Béla Bartók (1881–1945): Six string quartets widely regarded as being the finest quartets of the first half of the 20th century.
- Reine Colaço Osorio-Swaab (1881–1971): String Quartet (1955).
- Nancy Dalberg (1881–1949): Three string quartets (No. 1 in D minor; No. 2 in G minor, Op. 14; No. 3, Op. 20)
- George Enescu (1881–1955): Two string quartets (No. 1 in E♭ and No. 2 in G, Op. 22 nos. 1 and 2, 1916–1920 and 1951).
- Nikolai Myaskovsky (1881–1950): Thirteen (1907–1949).
- Nikolai Roslavets (1881–1944): Five string quartets (1913, 1915, 1920, 1929–1931, 1942, and a minuet (1907); only Nos. 1, 3 & 5, and the minuet, have been published as of 2015.
- Ignatz Waghalter (1881–1949): One string quartet, in D major, Op. 3.
- Karl Weigl (1881–1949): Eight string quartets: No. 1 in C minor (1903 or 1905); No. 2 in E (with viola d'amore) (1906); No. 3 in A major (1909); No. 4 in D minor (1924); No. 5 in G major (1933); No. 6 in C (1939); No. 7 in F minor (1942); No. 8 in D (1949)
- Marion Bauer (1882–1955): String Quartet, Op. 20 (1925) and Five Pieces (Patterns) Op. 41 (1946–1949).
- Mary Howe (1882–1964): Fugue for String Quartet (1922), Little Suite for String Quartet (1928), Cancion romanesca for String Quartet (1928), Scherzo and Fugue for String Quartet (1936), String Quartet (1939), Yaddo for String Quartet (1940), Three Pieces after Emily Dickinson for String Quartet (1941).
- Zoltán Kodály (1882–1967): Two string quartets (1908 and 1917).
- Mary Lucas (1882–1952): Six string quartets
- Joseph Marx (1882–1964): Three string quartets. not counting the original version of one and a draft.
- Gian Francesco Malipiero (1882–1973): Eight string quartets (1920–1964).
- Artur Schnabel (1882–1951): Five string quartets (1918–1940).
- Alf Hurum (1882–1972): One string quartet (1912–1916).
- Igor Stravinsky (1882–1971): Three Pieces for String Quartet (1914); Concertino (1920); Double Canon for String Quartet (1959).
- Joaquín Turina (1882–1949): An early quartet Op. 4 (1911) and a later work for string quartet, La oración del torero (1925).
- Karol Szymanowski (1882–1937): Two string quartets, No. 1, Op. 37 in C major (1917) and No. 2, Op. 56 (1927).
- Arnold Bax (1883–1953): Three (mature) string quartets: No. 1 in G major (1918), No. 2 in E minor (1925) and No. 3 in F major (1936) and also 2 quartets from 1902.
- Fran Lhotka (1883–1962): String quartet in G minor.
- Eva Ruth Spalding (1883–1969) Five string quartets
- Anton Webern (1883–1945): His String Quartet is composed using the twelve-tone technique. His Five Movements, Op. 5 (1909) and Six Bagatelles, Op. 9 (1911–13) are also significant in SQ literature. Plus, a string quartet, a slow movement and a rondo from 1905.
- Dina Appeldoorn (1884–1938): String Quartet in B♭ major (1932).
- Marguerite Béclard d'Harcourt (1884–1964): At least two string quartets, no. 1 in 1920, no. 2 in 1923.
- Louis Gruenberg (1884–1964): String Quartet No. 1 Op. 6, Four Indiscretions for String Quartet Op. 20, Four Diversions for String Quartet Op. 32, String Quartet No. 2 Op. 40, String Quartet No. 3 Op. 52, Five Variations on a Popular Tune for String Quartet.
- Giulia Recli (1884–1970): Quartetto per archi (1913).
- Alban Berg (1885–1935): String Quartet, Op. 3 (1910) and Lyric Suite (Berg) (1926) for string quartet.
- Egon Wellesz (1885–1974): Nine string quartets, No. 1 'in five movements' Op. 14 (1911–12) through No. 9, Op. 97 (1966) and Op. 103 Music for String Quartet.
- Rebecca Clarke (1886–1979): Comodo et amabile for String Quartet (1924), Poem for String Quartet (1926), Combined Carols for String Quartet (1941).
- Elizabeth Gyring (1886–1970): Seven string quartets.
- Algot Haquinius (1886–1966): Three string quartets.
- Othmar Schoeck (1886–1957): Two string quartets (Op. 23, 1913, and Op. 37, 1923) and a movement for string quartet (1908).
- Kurt Atterberg (1887–1974): Three string quartets.
- Bernard van Dieren (1887–1936): No 1 (1912), No 2, op 9 (1917), No 3, op 15 (1919), No 4, op 16 (1923), No 6 (1927), No 5 (1931)
- Florence Price (1887–1953): Two string quartets (1929, 1935) and Five Folksongs in Counterpoint for String Quartet (1951).
- Ernst Toch (1887–1964): Thirteen string quartets, the first five now lost, and a brief Dedication for quartet.
- Fartein Valen (1887–1952): Two string quartets.
- Heitor Villa-Lobos (1887–1959): Seventeen string quartets between 1915 and 1957.
- Johanna Beyer (1888–1944): At least four (1934, 1936, ?, 1943).
- Hugo Kauder (1888–1972): Nineteen string quartets.
- Matthijs Vermeulen (1888–1967): One string quartet (1960–61).
- Rosy Wertheim (1888–1949): One string quartet (1933).
- Ina Boyle (1889–1967): One string quartet (1934).
- Ethel Glenn Hier (1889–1971): Two string quartets.
- Eleni Lambiri (1889–1960): String quartet in A major.

=== Born in the 1890s ===
- Andres Isasi (1890–1940): Eight string quartets.
- Bohuslav Martinů (1890–1959): Ten string quartets of which only eight survive, Nos. 1–7 and the unnumbered Tři jezdci (1902)
- Arthur Bliss (1891–1975): Four string quartets: No. 1 in A major (1914); No. 2 (1923); No. 3 in B♭ major (1941); No. 4 (1950).
- Frida Kern (1891–1988): Five string quartets (Op. 8 in 1930, Op. 21 in 1934, Op. 39 in 1941, Op. 48 in 1948, Op. 72 in 1956).
- Sergei Prokofiev (1891–1953): Two string quartets (1930 and 1941).
- Dorothy Gow (1892–1982): String Quartet No. 1, Fantasy String Quartet (1932), String Quartet No. 2 (1933), String Quartet in One Movement (1947).
- Arthur Honegger (1892–1955): Three string quartets, in C minor (1917), D major (1936), and E major (1937).
- Darius Milhaud (1892–1974): Eighteen, the fourteenth and fifteenth of which may be played as an octet.
- Hilding Rosenberg (1892–1985): Twelve (No. 1, 1920 revised 1955 to No. 12, 1957).
- Germaine Tailleferre (1892–1983): One quartet (1917–19).
- Arthur Lourié (1892–1966): Three quartets: No. 1 (1915), No. 2 (1923) and No. 3 Suite (1924).
- Alois Hába (1893–1973): Sixteen quartets, employing various microtonal systems (e.g. No. 11 uses a sixth-tone system; No. 12, quarter-tone; No. 16, fifth-tone).
- Rued Langgaard (1893–1952): Six numbered quartets, as well as a set of variations (BVN 71, 1914, r. 1931), the Italian Scherzo (BVN 408, 1950), the (unnumbered) String Quartet in A♭ major (BVN 155, 1918), and Rosengaardsspil (Rose Garden Play; BVN 153, 1918).
- Paul Dessau (1894–1979): Seven string quartets (No. 1 before 1943 and published 1969?, No. 2 in 1942/43, No. 3 in 1943–1946, No. 4 Barbaraquartett (or 99 Bars for Barbara), No. 5 Quartettino (Felsenstein-Quartett) in 1955, No. 6 Sieben Sätze für Streichquartett in 1974, No. 7 in 1975. Also a string quartet movement in 1957.
- Kalitha Dorothy Fox (1894–1934): Phantasy Quartet (posthumous performance 1935).
- Ernest John Moeran (1894–1950): Two string quartets (in A minor and in E♭ major).
- Willem Pijper (1894–1947): Five string quartets (1914, 1920, 1923, 1928, 1946).
- Walter Piston (1894–1976): Five string quartets (from 1933 to 1962).
- Erwin Schulhoff (1894–1942): Two numbered string quartets (1924, 1925), one unnumbered quartet. (1918), plus a Divertimento, Op. 14 (1914) and a set of Five Pieces (1923).
- Marcelle Soulage (1894–1970): String Quartet in C minor, Op. 58 (1922).
- Vally Weigl (1894–1982): Andante for Strings (1945), Adagio for Strings (1951), Adagietto for Strings (To Emily) (1970).
- Jeanne Barbillion (1895–1992): String Quartet (1936).
- Henriëtte Bosmans (1895–1952): String Quartet (1927).
- Dinorá de Carvalho (1895–1980): Two string quartets, No. 1 (1962) and No. 2 (Mitos e Palmares, 1973/74).
- Paul Hindemith (1895–1963): A violist, wrote seven string quartets.
- Leo Ornstein (1895–2002): Three quartets.
- Dane Rudhyar (1895–1985): Crisis and Overcoming (1978), Advent (1976).
- William Grant Still (1895–1978): Danzas de Panama for String Quartet (1948), Lyric String Quartette (Musical Portraits of Three Friends) (1960).
- Maria Bach (1896–1978): Two string quartets (1935, 1937).
- Fernande Decruck (1896–1954): At least three string quartets.
- Roberto Gerhard (1896–1970): Two string quartets (1950–1955; 1960–1962). Three earlier quartets at least are lost.
- Howard Hanson (1896–1981): One string quartet in one movement, his Op. 23 (1923).
- Jean Rivier (1896-1987): 2 string quartets.
- Roger Sessions (1896–1985): Two string quartets (1938, 1951), Canons to the memory of Stravinsky (1971).
- Virgil Thomson (1896–1989): Two string quartets (1931 and 1932).
- Henry Cowell (1897–1965): Five quartets.
- John Fernström (1897–1961): Eight quartets.
- Erich Wolfgang Korngold (1897–1957): Perhaps better known for his movie scores, his formal works include three string quartets, Op. 16 in A (1923), Op. 26 in E♭(1933), Op. 34 in D (1945).
- Francisco Mignone (1897–1986): Two, both in 1957.
- Benna Moe (1897–1983): One, in f minor (1934).
- Quincy Porter (1897–1966): Nine (No. 1 in E minor, 1922–23; No. 9, 1958).
- Alexandre Tansman (1897–1986): Nine (one lost, replaced by Triptych) for most of that, Fanfare review of a recording for the rest).
- Hanns Eisler (1898–1962): One string quartet, 1937.
- George Gershwin (1898–1937): One piece for string quartet, a Lullaby, 1919 or 1920.
- Dorothy Howell (1898–1982): Dance for String Quartet (1927), String Quartet in D Minor.
- Viktor Ullmann (1898–1944): Three string quartets of which two are lost.
- Pavel Haas (1899–1944): Three string quartets from 1920 to 1938.
- Hans Krása (1899–1944): One quartet (1921).
- Jón Leifs (1899–1968): Icelandic composer, 3 string quartets: No. 1 'Mors et vita', Op. 21, (1939); No. 2 'Vita et mors', Op. 36, (1948–1951); No. 3 'El Greco', Op. 64 (1965). (source: Grove)
- Silvestre Revueltas (1899–1940): Four quartets.
- Herbert Griffiths (1899–1969): One string quartet in B minor (1920).
- Alexander Tcherepnin (1899–1977): Two quartets (1922, 1926).
- Randall Thompson (1899–1984): Two quartets, in D minor (about 1941 – possibly earlier, see Library of Congress listing?) and G major (1967).
- Stefania Turkewich (1899–1978): Two string quartets in the 1960s.

== Born in the 20th century ==
=== Born in the 1900s ===
- George Antheil (1900–1959): Three quartets (1925, 1927, 1948), plus two smaller collections.
- Aaron Copland (1900–1990): Four pieces for string quartet (1921, unpublished; 1923, 1923, 1928).
- Ernst Krenek (1900–1991): Eight, covering a wide range of 20th Century musical styles.
- Otto Luening (1900–1996): Piece for string quartet published in 1914, and two quartets published by CF Peters as string quartets 2 and 3 in the 1970s (No. 2 dating from 1922, No. 3 from 1927).
- Alexander Mosolov (1900–1973): Probably two quartets: Op. 24 1926 and 1943; only No. 1 survived.
- Hans Erich Apostel (1901–1972): Two mature numbered quartets (1935, 1956) and other works for string quartet (early quartets from 1925 and 1926; 6 Epigrams, Op. 33 from 1962).
- Henri Sauguet (1901–1989): Three numbered string quartets (1941, 1948, 1979) and Méditation (1983)
- Edmund Rubbra (1901–1986): Four string quartets (No. 1 in F minor, Op. 35, 1933 revised 1946; No. 2 in E♭ Op. 73, 1951; No. 3, Op. 112, 1963; No. 4, Op. 150, 1977; dates from the notes to the Sterling Quartet cycle on Conifer).
- Ruth Crawford Seeger (1901–1953): One string quartet (1931).
- Emil Hlobil (1901–1987): At least five string quartets (at least 3 published: No. 2, Op. 15, (1935–36); No. 3, Op. 50 (1955); No. 5, Op. 81 (1971)
- Simon Laks (1901–1983): Five string quartets (1928, 1932, 1946, 1962, 1964).
- Vissarion Shebalin (1902–1963): Nine quartets (1923–1963).
- Freda Swain (1902–1985): Two string quartets, No 1 Norfolk (1924) and No 2 in G minor (1949).
- Stefan Wolpe (1902–1972): String quartet (1968–1969).
- William Walton (1902–1983): Two string quartets (1922 and 1947).
- Berthold Goldschmidt (1903–1996): Four quartets; No 1 (1925–26), No 2 (1936), No 3 (1988–89), No 4 (1992).
- Priaulx Rainier (1903–1986): String Quartet No. 1 in C minor (1939). There is another string quartet from her student years in London (1922/1924?) to which she later didn't look back to favourably.
- Günter Raphael (1903–1960): Six quartets (1924–1954).
- Iet Stants (1903–1968): Two string quartets (1920 and 1921/1922).
- Lennox Berkeley (1903–1989): Three string quartets.
- Nikos Skalkottas (1904–1949): Wrote many; only 4 works survived: No. 1 (1928), No. 3 (1935), No. 4 (1940) and Zehn Stücke [Skizzen] (1940) plus arrangements of traditional Greek dances.
- Dmitry Kabalevsky (1904–1987): Two string quartets (1928 and 1945).
- Arthur Dennington (1904–1988): String quartet (1926).
- William Alwyn (1905–1985): Three string quartets (1954, 1975 and 1984), Three Winter Poems for string quartet (1948), and a Novelette for string quartet (1938).
- Karl Amadeus Hartmann (1905–1963): Two quartets (1933, 1945–46).
- Alan Rawsthorne (1905–1971): Four quartets (1935–1965).
- Giacinto Scelsi (1905–1988): Five quartets (1944, 1961, 1963, 1964, 1984).
- Verdina Shlonsky (1905–1990): One string quartet.
- Julia Smith (composer) (1905–1989): One string quartet (1964).
- Michael Tippett (1905–1998): Five numbered string quartets plus two unnumbered youthful works.
- Eduard Tubin (1905–1982): One string quartet.
- Klaus Egge (1906–1979): Several quartets.
- Benjamin Frankel (1906–1973): Five quartets (1944–1965); No 1 (1944), No 2 (1945), No 3 (1947), No 4 (1948), No 5 (1965)
- Dmitri Shostakovich (1906–1975): Fifteen string quartets.
- Elisabeth Lutyens (1906–1984): Thirteen quartets.
- Ross Lee Finney (1906–1997): Eight quartets: No. 1 in F minor (1935) to No. 8 (1960).
- Louise Talma (1906–1996): String Quartet (1954).
- Guirne Creith (1907–1996): String Quartet in E minor in one movement (1928).
- Wolfgang Fortner (1907–1987): String quartets No 1 (1929), No 2 (1938), No 3 (1948), No 4 (1975)
- Camargo Guarnieri (1907–1993): Two string quartets (1932, 1944).
- Imogen Holst (1907–1984): Phantasy Quartet (1928), String Quartet No. 1 (1946).
- Elizabeth Maconchy (1907–1994): Thirteen quartets. No 1 (1931), No 2 (1937), No 3 (1938), No 4 (1943), No 5 (1948), No 6 (1950), No 7 (1957), No 8 (1967), No 9 (1968), No 10 (1971), No 11 (1976), No 12 (1979), No 13 (1983).
- Miklós Rózsa (1907–1995): Best known for his film scores, Rózsa also composed concert music including two string quartets, No. 1, Op. 22 (1950) and No. 2, Op. 38 (1981).
- Ahmed Adnan Saygun (1907–1991): Four string quartets: Op. 27 (1947), Op. 35 (1957), Op. 43 (1966) and Op. 78 (1990).
- Elliott Carter (1908–2012): Five string quartets in the second half of the 20th century; also, Elegy (1948) and Fragments 1 & 2 (1994; 1999); the second quartet won the Pulitzer Prize for Music, 1960; the third, in 1973.
- Kurt Hessenberg (1908–1994): Eight string quartets (1934–1987).
- Zenobia Powell Perry (1908–2004): Two string quartets (1956, 1964).
- John Verrall (1908–2001): Seven string quartets.
- Grażyna Bacewicz (1909–1969): Seven string quartets, the first two only recently published and recorded (the others from 1947 to 1965).
- Vagn Holmboe (1909–1996): Twenty-one numbered quartets, the last of which (Quartetto sereno, Op. 197, 1996) was completed by Per Nørgård. Also extant is a handful of 'lettered' quartets (in various degrees of completion), a quartet arrangement ofSværm (Swarm, Op. 190b, 1996; originally for two violins), and the Concerto for String Quartet (Op. 195, 1996; includes orchestra), Holmboe's last completed work.
- Minna Keal (1909–1999): Fantasy String Quartet (1929), String Quartet, Op. 1 (1976–77).

=== Born in the 1910s ===
- Samuel Barber (1910–1981): One string quartet (B minor, Op. 11, 1936–1943), from which the Adagio for Strings was orchestrated, as well as a Serenade (Op. 1, 1928; arranged for strings in 1944) and Dover Beach (Op. 3, 1931; includes baritone soloist); a second quartet, commissioned in 1947, never progressed beyond early sketches.
- Evgeny Golubev (1910–1988): twenty-four string quartets (1931–1986).
- Paule Maurice (1910–1967): One string quartet.
- William Schuman (1910–1992): Five string quartets (1936–1987).
- Josef Tal (1910–2008) Three string quartets (1954, 1963, 1976).
- Bernard Herrmann (1911–1975): Best known as a film composer (Citizen Kane, Psycho, Taxi Driver, etc.), Echoes was his only string quartet (1966)
- Alan Hovhaness (1911–2000): American composer of Armenian heritage wrote 4 string quartets, recorded by the Shanghai Quartet amongst others.
- Nino Rota (1911–1979): One string quartet (1948–1954).
- Phyllis Tate (1911–1987): String Quartet in F major (1952), Movements for String Quartet.
- John Cage (1912–1992): String Quartet in Four Parts (1950), Thirty Pieces for String Quartet (1983), Music for Four (the quartet parts extracted from his Music for...) (1987–1988), Four (1989). Also, many of Cage's indeterminate scores can be arranged for string quartet.
- Arkady Filippenko (1912–1983): Ukrainian composer who wrote three string quartets; No. 1 in A minor, No. 2 in D major, No. 3 in G major. String quartet No. 2 was awarded the U.S.S.R. State Prize in 1948.
- Jean Françaix (1912–1997): String Quartet in G major (1934).
- Peggy Glanville-Hicks (1912–1990): String Quartet no. 1 (1937).
- Conlon Nancarrow (1912–1997): Three string quartets (1945, c. 1948, 1987); second incomplete.
- Barbara Pentland (1912–2000): Five string quartets between 1945 and 1985.
- Vadim Salmanov (1912–1978): Six string quartets.
- Violet Archer (1913–2000): Three string quartets between 1940 and 1981.
- Benjamin Britten (1913–1976): Three numbered string quartets (1941, 1945 and 1975) plus two early unnumbered ones (1928 and 1931) and a number of other works for string quartet (such as the three Divertimenti, 1933).
- Matilde Capuis (1913–2017): String quartet in C♯ minor.
- Vivian Fine (1913–2000): Prelude for String Quartet (1937), String Quartet (1957).
- Dulcie Holland (1913–2000): Six string quartets between 1981 and 1997.
- Tikhon Khrennikov (1913–2007): Three quartets, the third his Op. 33 (1988).
- Witold Lutosławski (1913–1994): One string quartet (1964).
- David Diamond (1915–2005): Ten string quartets, from 1940 to 1974.
- Pamela Harrison (1915–1990): One string quartet (1944).
- Peggy Hubicki (1915–2006): Theme and Variations for string quartet.
- Vítězslava Kaprálová (1915–1940): One string quartet, Op. 8 (1935–1936).
- George Perle (1915–2009): Eleven, of which five (1–4, 6) were withdrawn.
- Vincent Persichetti (1915–1987): Four string quartets (1939, 1944, 1959, 1972).
- Milton Babbitt (1916–2011): Five abstract, densely serialistic quartets in the mid-20th century, and a sixth premiered in 2002.
- Henri Dutilleux (1916–2013): One quartet, Ainsi la nuit (1976).
- Einar Englund (1916–1999): One quartet in 1985.
- Alberto Ginastera (1916–1983): Four string quartets, 1948 to 1974, the last with baritone to a text from Beethoven's Heiligenstadt Testament.
- Bernard Stevens (1916–1983): Two quartets; No 1 (1949), No 2 (1962)
- Brian Boydell (1917–2000): Three (1949, 1957, 1969), plus Adagio and Scherzo for String Quartet (1991).
- Lou Harrison (1917–2003): String Quartet Set (1979).
- Geraldine Mucha (1917–2012): Four string quartets between 1941 and 1988.
- Isang Yun (1917–1995): Six string quartets (No. 1 before 1956, No. 2 withdrawn, No. 3 in 1959, revised in 1961, No. 4 in 1988, No. 5 in 1990 and No. 6 in 1992.
- George Rochberg (1918–2005) Seven quartets: The sixth quartet includes a set of variations on Pachelbel's Canon; the second includes a soprano part with texts by Rilke; the seventh includes a baritone part to texts by his late son. String Quartet No. 3 is well known for its supposedly neo-romantic esthetic.
- Sven-Erik Bäck (1919–1994): Four (1945, 1947, 1962, 1984).
- Roslyn Brogue (1919–1981): One string quartet (1951).
- Eleonora Eksanishvili (1919–2003): Two string quartets (1944, 1949).
- Leon Kirchner (1919–2009): Four (1949, 1958, 1967, 2007); the third, which includes a tape part, won the Pulitzer Prize for Music, 1967.
- Mieczysław Weinberg (1919–1996): Seventeen, from his Op. 2 (1937 rev. 1986) to Op. 146 (1987).

=== Born in the 1920s ===
- Peter Racine Fricker (1920–1990): Three string quartets (1948, 1953, 1976).
- Bruno Maderna (1920–1973): Quartetto per archi (c. 1946); Quartetto per archi in due tempi (1955), dedicated to Luciano Berio.
- William Bergsma (1921–1994): Five string quartets (1942, 1944, 1953, 1970, 1982).
- Ruth Gipps (1921–1999): Two quartets, Sabrina, String Quartet in one movement, Op. 13 (1940) and Op. 47 (1956).
- Karel Husa (1921–2016): Four quartets; the third quartet won the Pulitzer Prize for Music, 1969.
- Andrew Imbrie (1921–2007): At least five (fifth written in 1987).
- Božidar Kantušer (1921–1999): Seven string quartets, between 1953 and 1988.
- Joonas Kokkonen (1921–1996): Three string quartets (1959, 1966, 1976).
- Robert Simpson (1921–1997): Fifteen string quartets between 1952 and 1991.
- Rosalina Abejo (1922–1991): Three string quartets.
- Doreen Carwithen (1922–2003): At least two string quartets, no. 1 in 1948, no. 2 in 1952. There are possibly also sketches for a third one.
- Stefans Grove (1922–2014): Two string quartets (1946, 1955)
- Ester Mägi (1922–2021): Three string quartets, No. 1 (1964), No. 2 (1965), and Vesper (1998/2016).
- Iannis Xenakis (1922–2001): Four works for string quartet: "st/4—1,080262" (1955–1962), which was written with the help of an IBM 7090 computer using stochastic algorithms, Tetras (1983), a work in nine sections, Tetora (1990), and Ergma (1994).
- György Ligeti (1923–2006): String Quartet No. 1 ("Métamorphoses nocturnes") (1953–1954) and String Quartet No. 2 (1968).
- Ursula Mamlok (1923–2016): Two string quartets (1963 and 1998).
- Peter Mennin (1923–1983): Two string quartets (1941 and 1951).
- Daniel Pinkham (1923–2006): At least one string quartet
- Mel Powell (1923–1998): Filigree Setting (1959), String Quartet (1982).
- Ludmila Ulehla (1923–2009): String Quartet in e minor (1953); Aria, Fugue and Toccata for String Quartet (1968).
- Lejaren Hiller (1924–1994): Seven quartets.
- Ezra Laderman (1924–2015): Twelve string quartets.
- Benjamin Lees (1924–2010): Six string quartets.
- Krystyna Moszumanska-Nazar (1924–2008): No. 1 (1954), No. 2 (1974), No. 3 (1979), Impressions for string quartet (1998), No. 4 (2003).
- Tatiana Nikolayeva (1924–1993): One string quartet (1960).
- Luigi Nono (1924–1990): Fragmente-Stille, an Diotima for string quartet (1980), inspired by the poetry of Friedrich Hölderlin
- Ruth Schönthal (1924–2006): Three string quartets: No. 1 (1962), No. 2 (In the Viennese Manner, 1983/1996), and No. 3 (In memoriam Holocaust, 1997).
- Veniamin Basner (1925–1996): Five string quartets: No. 1 Op. 1 (1948) in one movement; No. 2 Op. 5 (1953), a piece in three movements; No. 3 Op. 9 (1960), in four movements; No. 4 Op. 18 (1969), in three movements; and No. 5 Op. 24 (1975), in two movements.
- Luciano Berio (1925–2003): Quatuor No. 1 (1956), dedicated to Bruno Maderna; Sincronie (1963–64); Notturno (1993); Glosse (1997).
- Edith Borroff (1925–2019): Four string quartets between 1941 and 1974.
- Pierre Boulez (1925–2016): Livre pour quatuor (1948/49; sixth movement completed 1959; fourth movement completed from sketches by Philippe Manoury in 2018).
- Bertold Hummel (1925–2002): String Quartet No. 1, Op. 3 (1951); String Quartet No. 2, Op. 46 (1972); 8 FRAGMENTS from Letters of Vincent van Gogh for Baritone and String Quartet, Op. 84 (1985); Concertante Music for Guitar and String Quartet, Op. 89a (1989).
- Gunther Schuller (1925–2015): Four quartets.
- Vladimir Shainsky (1925–2017): At least one string quartet.
- Boris Tchaikovsky (1925–1996): Six (1954–1976).
- Earle Brown (1926–2002): One quartet (1965).
- Paul Cooper (1926–1996): Six quartets.
- Morton Feldman (1926–1987): Structures (1951); Three Pieces (1954–1956); String Quartet No. 1 (1979), lasts about 100 minutes; String Quartet No. 2 (1983) lasts over six hours.
- Hans Werner Henze (1926–2012): Five.
- Ben Johnston (1926–2019): Ten string quartets: No 1 Nine Variations (1959); No 2 (1964); No 3 Vergings (1966); No 4 Amazing Grace (1973); No 5 (1979); No 6 (1980); No 7 (1984); No 8 (1984–1986); No 9 (1987–88); and No 10 (1995). String Quartets Nos 3 and 4 may be performed together as Crossings.
- Betsy Jolas (born 1926): Four string quartets.
- György Kurtág (born 1926): String Quartet, Op. 1, Hommage à Mihály András (12 Microludes), Op. 13, Officium breve in memorium Andreae Szervánszky, Op. 28, 6 Moments musicaux Op 44 (2005); plus, the shorter works Aus der Ferne III (1991), Aus der Ferne V (1999), Hommage à Jacob Obrecht (2004–2005), Arioso – Hommage à Walter Levin 85 (2009).
- Maria de Lourdes Martins (1926–2009): Two string quartets (1952–1953, 1989).
- Claire Polin (1926–1995): Three string quartets, written between 1953 and 1969.
- Esther Scliar (1926–1978): Movimento de quarteto (1966).
- Carlos Veerhoff (1926–2011): String quartet op.1 (1949) and String quartet No.2 (1972).
- Marilyn J. Ziffrin (1926–2018): Two string quartets (1970, 1999).
- Emma Lou Diemer (1927–2024): One string quartet (1987).
- Thomas Wilson (1927–2001): Four string quartets most notably String Quartet No. 3 (1958) McEwen Composition Prize and String Quartet No. 4 (1978), as well as numerous other chamber works.
- Samuel Adler (born 1928): Ten quartets; No. 6 includes a soprano part.
- Ursula Mamlok (1928–2016): Two string quartets (1962, 1997).
- Thea Musgrave (born 1928): One string quartet (1958).
- Einojuhani Rautavaara (1928–2016): Four string quartets.
- Ezra Sims (1928–2015): First Quartet (1953); String Quartet No. 2 (1962) (1974) (really a quintet for winds and strings), Third Quartet (1962), Fourth Quartet.
- Karlheinz Stockhausen (1928–2007): Helikopter-Streichquartett (from Mittwoch aus Licht), for string quartet in 4 helicopters.
- Zlata Tkach (1928–2006): One string quartet (1982).
- George Crumb (1929–2022): String Quartet, and Black Angels (Images I), for electric string quartet.
- Peter Sculthorpe (1929–2014): Eighteen string quartets, of which the first five are considered lost, although isolated movements have been performed and recorded; the twelfth, fourteenth, sixteenth, and eighteenth quartets include optional parts for didgeridu; the thirteenth includes soprano voice.

=== Born in the 1930s ===
- Larry Austin (1930–2018): Quartet in Open Style (1964).
- Vera Baeva (1930–2017): One string quartet.
- Jacqueline Fontyn (born 1930): Horizons for String Quartet (1977).
- Cristóbal Halffter (1930–2021): Seven quartets.
- Ruth Lomon (1930–2017): Vitruvian Scroll for String Quartet (1981), Janus for String Quartet (1984), The Butterfly Effect for String Quartet (1989).
- Dieter Schnebel (1930–2018): Three quartets: Stücke für Streichinstrumente (1955); String Quartet No. 2 (2000–2007), which includes two vocal parts; String Quartet No. 3 ("Im Raum") (2005–2006)
- Tōru Takemitsu (1930–1996): A Way a Lone for string quartet (1981).
- Nancy Van de Vate (1930–2023): Two string quartets (1969, 2005).
- Sofia Gubaidulina (1931–2025): Four string quartets (1971, 1987, 1987, 1994), the last with tape.
- Mauricio Kagel (1931–2008): Five.
- Joyce Mekeel (1931–1997): Spindrift for String Quartet (1970).
- Ib Nørholm (1931–2019): At least nine, No. 1 from 1954 to No. 9, his Op. 137, in 1994
- James Douglas (1932–2022): 15 string quartets.
- Pelle Gudmundsen-Holmgreen (1932–2016): Fourteen quartets; the tenth and eleventh also have optional vocal ensemble parts; the twelfth, thirteenth and fourteenth quartets were designed to be played individually, or any two or all three simultaneously; also the Concerto Grosso for string quartet and instrument ensemble (1990/2006).
- Alexander Goehr (1932–2024): Four string quartets (Op. 5 (1957), Op. 23 (1967), Op. 37 (1976), Op. 52 (1990)).
- Glenn Gould (1932–1982): String Quartet in F minor, Op. 1 (1953–55).
- Marta Jirácková (born 1932): The Blankenburg Fugue, Op. 33 (1985), Three Paintings by Edvard Munch, Op. 54 (2000).
- John Kinsella (1932–2021): Five numbered string quartets (1960, 1968, 1977, 1993, 2013), and On Hearing Purcell and Shostakovitch at Bantry House: June 2008 (2009).
- Tera de Marez Oyens (1932–1996): Probably three. Contrafactus (1981), String Quartet no. 3 (1988).
- Per Nørgård (1932–2025): Ten string quartets.
- Pauline Oliveros (1932–2016): 70 Chords for Terry (2005).
- Rodion Shchedrin (1932–2025): Lyric Scenes (2006).
- Gitta Steiner (1932–1990): Two string quartets (1968, 1984).
- Seóirse Bodley (1933–2023): Four string quartets (1968, 1992, 2004, 2007).
- John Exton (1933–2009): Seven string quartets: No. 1 1957, No. 2 1961, No. 3 1969, No. 4 1972, No. 5 1972, No. 6 1974 and No. 7 1975.
- Henryk Górecki (1933–2010): String Quartet No. 1 ("Already It Is Dusk"), Op. 62, String Quartet No. 2 ("Quasi una Fantasia"), Op. 64; String Quartet No. 3 (Piesni Spiewaja, "...songs are sung"), Op. 67.
- Krzysztof Penderecki (1933–2020): Four string quartets (1960, 1968, 2008, 2016); Der Unterbrochene Gedanke (1984).
- R. Murray Schafer (1933–2021): Thirteen string quartets; the seventh quartet includes a soprano part, the fourth and ninth include tape parts. Diagnosed with Alzheimer's Disease in 2015, Schafer composed the brief String Quartet No. 13, which he subtitled 'Alzheimer's Masterpiece', for the Quatuor Molinari.
- Harrison Birtwistle (1934–2022): Nine Movements for String Quartet (1991–1996), String Quartet: The Tree of Strings (2007); Hoquetus Irvinus (2013) (short work for the Arditti Quartet's fortieth anniversary); String Quartet No 3: The Silk House Sequences (2015).
- Peter Maxwell Davies (1934–2016): String Quartet in One Movement (1961); a few other shorter works; Maxwell Davies was commissioned by Naxos Records to compose ten string quartets, completed in 2007. The recordings are performed by the Maggini Quartet.
- Peter Dickinson (1934–2023): Two string quartets; No 1 (1958), No 2 (1976)
- Jan Klusák (born 1934): Composed 6 string quartets to date, the first 5 in 1955–56, 1961–62, 1975, 1990, and 1994 and the most recent in 2003.
- Teresa Procaccini (born 1934): One string quartet, Op. 45 (1969).
- Roger Reynolds (born 1934): Tetra, Coconino . . . A Shattered Landscape (1985; rev. 1993), Visions (1991), Ariadne's Thread, with computer (1994), not forgotten (2007-10), FLIGHT (2012-16).
- Alfred Schnittke (1934–1998): Four string quartets; also, Canon in Memoriam Igor Stravinsky and Variations for string quartet.
- Christian Wolff (born 1934): Summer (1960); Lines (1972); String Quartet Exercises Out of Songs (1974–1976); For E.C. (2003); for two violinists, violist and 'cellist (2008); Out of Kilter (2019); Ameublement (String Quartet 6) (2022); Ferns for string quartet and small orchestra (2023).
- Biancamaria Furgeri (born 1935): Immagini fluttuanti for String Quartet, Op. 24 (1985).
- Helmut Lachenmann (born 1935): Three string quartets: Gran Torso (1972), Reigen seliger Geister (1989), and Grido (2001), plus Tanzsuite mit Deutschlandlied for string quartet and orchestra.
- François-Bernard Mâche (born 1935): Eridan, String Quartet Op. 57 (1986), written for the Arditti Quartet; Moirés for string quartet and tape, Op. 73 (1994).
- Arvo Pärt (born 1935): Psalom, Summa, and arranged Fratres for string quartet.
- Terry Riley (born 1935): String Quartet (1960); returned to pre-composed notated music at the request of the Kronos Quartet in the 1970s: G Song; Sunrise of the Planetary Dream Collector; Cadenza on the Night Plain; Mythic Birds Waltz; Salome Dances for Peace; Requiem for Adam; The Sands for string quartet and orchestra; The Cusp of Magic for string quartet, pipa and assorted toys; Sun Rings for string quartet, choir and backing track of sounds recorded by NASA in space, and others.
- Aulis Sallinen (born 1935): Five string quartets.
- Peter Schickele (1935–2024): Five string quartets, two quintets with piano.
  - P.D.Q. Bach (1807-1742?): String Quartet in F ("The Moose"), S.Y2K.
- La Monte Young (born 1935): On Remembering a Naiad (Five small pieces) (1956); Chronos Kristalla (Time Crystals) (1990), where the quartet's strings are tuned to Just intonation, natural harmonics are played throughout, and the performance lasts about ninety minutes.
- Iván Erőd (1936–2019): Three quartets: Op. 18 (1975), Op. 26 (1978), Op. 78 (2003). Numbers 2 and 3 recorded by the ALEA Ensemble.
- Steve Reich (born 1936): Different Trains (1988), for string quartet and tape; Triple Quartet (1998), which may be performed by one quartet (with tape), three quartets, or a 36 piece orchestra; and WTC 9/11 (2009–10), for string quartet and tape.
- Herbert Blendinger (1936–2020): Four quartets: Op. 11 (1957), Op. 19 (1969), Op. 29 (1976), Op. 54 (1990) – numbers 2, 3 and 4 have been recorded by the ALEA Ensemble.
- Anthony Payne (1936–2021): Three quartets: No 1 (1978); No 2 (2010); No 3 (2018).
- Erich Urbanner (born 1936): Three quartets.
- Janet Beat (born 1937): So far three string quartets: String Quartet No. 1 (1992–99), Scherzo Notturno for String Quartet (1992), String Quartet No. 3, The Blackbird (2014).
- Philip Glass (born 1937): Three string quartets as a student, eight mature string quartets (1966, 1983, 1985, 1989, 1991, 2013, 2014, 2018), music for string quartet for the 1931 film Dracula (1998), and the suite from Bent (2009).
- Katherine Hoover (1937–2018): Two string quartets (1999, 2004).
- Marta Lambertini (1937–2019): Quasares for String Quartet (1971), Vaghe stelle dell’Orsa for String Quartet (1978).
- Valentyn Silvestrov (born 1937): Three quartets (1974, 1988, 2011), plus Quartetto Piccolo (1961).
- Ann Southam (1937–2010): Song of the Varied Thrush for String Quartet (1991).
- Zbigniew Bargielski (born 1937): Six string quartets (1976, 1980, 1985-1986, 1994, 2001, 2006).
- Bart Berman (born 1938): String quartet (1958); Four Melodies for string quartet (1994).
- Ann Carr-Boyd (born 1938): Two string quartets (1964, 1966).
- Gloria Coates (1938–2023): Glissando String Quartet (1962), String Quartet No. 1 „Protestation Quartet" (1965/66), No. 2 „Mobile“ (1971), No.3 (1975), No. 4 (1976), Six Movements for String Quartet (1978), No. 5 (1988), No. 6 (1999), No. 7 „Angels“ with organ (2001), No. 8 (2001/02), No. 9 (2007), No. 10 „Among the Asteroids“ (1971/76).
- John Corigliano (born 1938): String quartet (1995), revised for string orchestra as Symphony No. 2 (2000).
- Alvin Curran (born 1938): VSTO (1993).
- John Harbison (born 1938): Six string quartets.
- Paavo Heininen (1938–2022): String Quartet No. 1, Op. 32c; String Quartet No. 2, Op. 64 ("Anadyr.mpl").
- Joan Tower (born 1938): 'Night Fields' (1994), 'In Memory' (2002), 'Incandescent' (2003), 'Angels ' (2008), 'White Water' (2011).
- Charles Wuorinen (1938–2020): Four, plus the short Divertimento and Josquiniana, in six movements based on Josquin des Prés.
- Louis Andriessen (1939–2021): Two string quartets.
- Elinor Armer (born 1939): Two string quartets (1983, 2011).
- Leo Brouwer (born 1939): Five quartets: No. 1 "Homage to Béla Bartók" (1961), Rem Tene Verba Sequentur (1969), No. 3 (1997), No. 4 "Rem tene verba sequentur II" (2007), No. 5 (2011).
- Maija Einfelde (born 1939): Three string quartets (1965, 1994, 2009).
- Jennifer Fowler (born 1939): String Quartet (1968), Towards release for String Quartet (2005).
- Jonathan Harvey (1939–2012): Four string quartets.
- Heinz Holliger (born 1939): Two (1973, 2007).
- Tom Johnson (1939–2024): Formulas for String Quartet (1994) (eight short movements, each following a mathematical formula); Combinations for String Quartet (2003); Tilework (2003)
- Tigran Mansurian (born 1939): Three string quartets; No 1 – 1983–1984, No 2 – 1984, No 3 – 1993
- John McCabe (1939–2015): Seven string quartets; Partita for String Quartet (No 1 – 1960), No 2 (1976), No 3 (1978), No 4 (1982), No 5 (1989), No 6 Silver Nocturnes (2011), No 7 Summer Eves (2012)
- Tomáš Svoboda (1939–2022): Ten string quartets as of 2009.
- Ellen Taaffe Zwillich (born 1939): String Quartet No. 1 (1974), String Quartet No. 2 (1998), String Quartet No. 3, Voyage (2012).

=== Born in the 1940s ===
- Maria Teresa Luengo (born 1940): 6 preludios for String Quartet (1968).
- Dorothy Rudd Moore (1940–2022): Modes for string quartet (1968).
- Judith Bailey (1941–2025): Five string quartets (Op. 31, Op. 39, East Coker Op. 87, The Dry Salvages Op. 88 and Little Gilding Op. 89).
- Chick Corea (1941–2021): One specifically for the Orion String Quartet in 2004.
- Moya Henderson (born 1941): Kudikynah Cave for String Quartet (1987), Two Days in June (2009), Bride's Recessional: the Beloved awaits (2012).
- Ivana Loudová (1941–2017): Two string quartets (No. 1 in 1964, No. 2 in 1974–1976), also Hukvaldy Suite for string quartet (1984) and Variations on J.V.Stamic-Theme (1989).
- Jenny McLeod (1941–2022): Airs for the Winged Isle (2009).
- Gillian Whitehead (born 1941): Te Ahua, Te Atarangi for String Quartet (1970), Angels Born at the Speed of Light for String Quartet (1990), Moon, Tides and Shoreline for String Quartet (1990), The Wind was in their Wings for String Quartet (1990), Hine-pu-te-hue for String Quartet (for string quartet and Maori instruments) (2002), Clouds over Mata-au for String Quartet (2010), No stars, not even clouds for String Quartet (2012), Poroporoaki for String Quartet (2015).
- Richard Wilson (born 1941): Five as of 2008.
- Ingram Marshall (1942–2022): Entrada (At the River) for string quartet amplified with processing, Evensongs, Voces Resonae (1984), and Fog Tropes II.
- Meredith Monk (born 1942): Stringsongs for string quartet (2004).
- Horațiu Rădulescu (1942–2008): Six string quartets; No. 4 is for quartet plus eight other quartets (live or pre-recorded) circling the audience.
- Joanna Bruzdowicz (1943–2021): Two (1983, 1988).
- Gavin Bryars (born 1943): Four: No.1 (1986 (Between the National and the Bristol)), No.2 (1990), No.3 (1998), No.4 (2020)
- Eleanor Cory (born 1943): Three string quartets (between 1985 and 2009).
- Edward Cowie (born 1943): Nine quartets, as of 2020; Nos. 8 and 9 can be combined to be performed as a string octet.
- Julio Estrada (born 1943): "Canto mnémico" (1973, rev. 1983), ishini'ioni (1984–1990) and "Quotidianus", with voice (2006).
- Brian Ferneyhough (born 1943): Sonatas for String Quartet (1967), String Quartets Nos. 2–6; the fourth includes a part for a soprano; also, Adagissimo (1983), Dum Transisset I-IV (2007), "Exordium – Elliotti Carteri in honorum centarii" (2008), Silentium (2014).
- Anne Lauber (born 1943): Suite for string quartet (1991).
- Tania Léon (born 1943): Escencia (2009), Cuarteto No. 2 (2011).
- David Matthews (born 1943): Fourteen up to 2017.
- Krzysztof Meyer (born 1943): Fifteen (1963, 1969, 1971, 1974, 1977, 1981, 1985, 1985, 1989, 1994, 2001, 2005, 2010, 2014, 2017).
- Fred Lerdahl (born 1943): Four string quartets (1978/2008, 1982/2010, 2008, 2016), the third of which was a finalist for the Pulitzer Prize for Music in 2010.
- Michèle Reverdy (born 1943): L'Intranquillité (1991), Quatre eaux fortes (2013), Quatuor pour Maud (2018).
- Gabriella Cecchi (born 1944): Sères for string quartet (1984).
- Paul Lansky (born 1944): String Quartet No. 1 (1967), String Quartet No. 2 (1971–1978), Ricercare (2000).
- Michael Nyman (born 1944): Five string quartets, plus a few smaller pieces.
- John Tavener (1944–2013): Four string quartets: The Hidden Treasure – String Quartet No. 1; The Last Sleep of the Virgin – String Quartet No. 2, for string quartet and handbells; Diódia – String Quartet No. 3; The Bridegroom – String Quartet No. 4; plus other works including parts for string quartet.
- Klaas de Vries (born 1944): One string quartet (1993).
- Victoria Bond (born 1945): Dreams of Flying (1994).
- Graciane Finzi (born 1945): Quatre Études for String Quartet (1976).
- Elizabeth Raum (born 1945): String Quartet (1993), Four Elements for String Quartet (2004), Table at the Bushwakker (2008).
- Judith Lang Zaimont (born 1945): De Infinitate Caeleste (Of the Celestial Infinite) (1980), String Quartet – The Figure (2007), A Strange Magic – String Quartet No. 2 (2016).
- Renate Birnstein (born 1946): One string quartet (1986).
- Colin Matthews (born 1946): Five string quartets.
- Jane O'Leary (born 1946): Mystic Play of Shadows (1995), In the Stillness of Time (2004), FanFare ConCorde (2005), ConTempo ConVersations (2005), the passing sound of forever (2015), Fanfare for Strings (2017), forever begin.... (Fanfare for a New Year) (2020).
- Sheila Silver (born 1946): String Quartet (1975), Four Etudes and a Fantasy – String Quartet No. 2 (1997).
- Pēteris Vasks (born 1946): Six string quartets.
- Joelle Wallach (born 1946): Three string quartets and Movement for String Quartet.
- Heinz Winbeck (1946–2019): Three string quartets (as of 2011), entitled Tempi capricciosi Tempi notturni (both 1979) and Jagdquartett (Hunting quartet) (1984).
- John Adams (born 1947): John's Book of Alleged Dances in 1994 for the Kronos Quartet; String Quartet No. 1 (2008); Fellow Traveler (2010); Absolute Jest (2011) (string quartet and orchestra); Second Quartet (2015).
- Frangiz Ali-Zadeh (born 1947): String Quartet No. 1 (1974), String Quartet No. 2, Dilogie I (1988), String Quartet No. 3, Mugam Sayagi (1993), String Quartet No. 4, Oasis (1998), In Search of ... for String Quartet (2005), Raegs (Dance) for string quartet (2016).
- Nicola LeFanu (born 1947): Four quartets. No 1 (1988), No 2 (1997), No 3 (2011), No 4 (2017).
- Ada Gentile (born 1947): Three quartets, No. 1 (1980), No. 2 (1983), No. 3 (2000).
- Salvatore Sciarrino (born 1947): Sei quartetti brevi (1967–1992), as well as String Quartets No. 7 (1999) and No. 8 (2008).
- Faye-Ellen Silverman (born 1947): String Quartet (Untitled) (1976), Paula's Song (1996), Let's Play (2007).
- Hilary Tann (1947–2023): And the Snow Did Lie (Et La Neige Resta) (2014).
- Gwyneth Van Anden Walker (born 1947): Three American Portraits (1988), Short Set for String Quartet (1993), Traveling Songs (including Coming Home) (1996, rev. 2003), Quartet for Leap Year (2000), Sweet Land (of Liberty) (2001), The Dove (2014), Sounds and Colors (2016), Folk Carols for Strings (2019).
- Marjan Mozetich (born 1948): Changes (1971); Lament in the Trampled Garden (1992), the compulsory piece for the 1992 Banff String Quartet Competition.
- Stephen Brown (born 1948): The Bugs (2024); Elk Lake (2025).
- Diana Burrell (born 1948): Coro, Gulls and Angels (1993), Earth (1998).
- Peter Ruzicka (born 1948): Seven quartets; the fourth includes a part for a speaker; the sixth includes a part for a soprano.
- Richard Festinger (born 1948): String Quartet No. 1 (1994); String Quartet No. 2, ″From the Beginning″ (2005); String Quartet No. 3 (2015); String Quartet No. 4, ″Icarus in Flight" (2018); String Quartet No. 5 (2021).
- Julia Tsenova (1948–2010): String Quartet No. 1 (2003).
- Jeanne Zaidel-Rudolph (born 1948): Strange Quartet (2006).
- Kalevi Aho (born 1949): 5 string quartets.
- Eleanor Alberga (born 1949): String Quartet No. 1 (1993), String Quartet No. 2 (1994), Remember (2000), String Quartet No. 3 (2001).
- Nikolaus Brass (born 1949): Ohne Titel: Musik für Streichquartett (1995); String Quartet No. 2 (2000/2002); String Quartet No. 3 (Erinnern und vergesse)(2004); String Quartet No. 4 (2008); String Quartet No. 5, with two obligato clarinets (Aus dem Wöterbuch der Liebenden) (2013); Etchings (2016); String Quartet No. 6 (Nach dem Roman Licht scheint auf mein Dach von Kenzaburo Oe).
- Shulamit Ran (born 1949): String Quartet No. 1 (1984), String Quartet No.2 – Vistas (1988–89), Bach-Shards (2002), String Quartet No. 3 – Glitter, Shards, Doom, Memory (2013).
- Christopher Rouse (1949–2019): three string quartets: number 1 (1982); number 2 (1988); number 3 (2010)
- Dave Smith (born 1949): Six string quartets: No. 1 Cuban quartet (1990/2014); No. 2 Natural selections (2009/10); No. 3 African mosaic (2014); No. 4 After Albania (2014); No. 5 All this and less (2014); No. 6 The myth of Sisyphus (2014)
- Kevin Volans (born 1949): twelve string quartets, plus a short quartet movement.

=== Born in the 1950s ===
- Lejla Agolli: (born 1950): String Quartet (1977).
- James Dillon (born 1950). Nine quartets: No 1 (1983); No 2 (1991); No 3 (1998); No 4 (2005); No 5 (2009); No 6 (2010); No 7 (2013); No 8 (2017); No 9 (2018).
- Elena Firsova (born 1950): At least twelve string quartets between 1970 and 2005.
- Alistair Hinton (born 1950): One quartet (1999)
- Libby Larsen (born 1950): String Quartet No. 4 (Emergence) (1991), Schoenberg, Schenker and Schillinger (1999), Quartet she wrote (2008), Sorrow, Song and Jubilee (2014).
- Lorenzo Ferrero (born 1951): Set of twelve string quartets entitled Tempi di quartetto (1996–1998); Five Aztec Gods (2005).
- Aleksander Lasoń (born 1951): Eight quartets, as of 2019.
- Eugeniusz Knapik (born 1951): Two string quartets (1980, 2019).
- Andrzej Krzanowski (1951–1990): Three string quartets (1973-1976, 1978, 1988).
- Rafał Augustyn (born 1951): Three string quartets (1973, 1981, 1995).
- Cecilia McDowall (born 1951): The case of the unanswered wire (2004), Are we on the same page? (2011).
- George Tsontakis (born 1951): Five string quartets (1980–2006).
- Lois V. Vierk (born 1951): Into the brightening air (1994/1999), dedicated to Mel Powell and River Beneath the River (1993).
- Hans Abrahamsen (born 1952): String Quartet No. 1 "Ten Preludes" (1973); String Quartet No. 2 (1981), String Quartet No. 3 (2010), String Quartet No. 4 (2012).
- Simon Bainbridge (1952–2021): String Quartet (1972).
- Reinhard Febel (born 1952): String Quartet (1981/82).
- Bunita Marcus (born 1952): The Rugmaker (1986).
- Wolfgang Rihm (1952–2024): Thirteen quartets, as of 2012, plus the elegical "Grave" (2010, in memory of Thomas Kakuska, late violist of the Alban Berg Quartet).
- Kaija Saariaho (1952–2023): Nymphea (Jardin Secret III) (1987) for string quartet and live electronics, Terra Memorium (2012).
- Grażyna Krzanowska (born 1952): Three string quartets (1973, 1980, 2011).
- John Luther Adams (born 1953): The Wind in High Places (2011); Dream of the Canyon Wren (2013); untouched (2015); Canticles of the Sky (2015); Everything That Rises (2017); Lines Made by Walking (2019); Waves & Particles (2021)
- Chen Yi (composer) (born 1953): At the Kansas City Chinese New Year Concert, Blue Dragon Sword Dance (from "At the Kansas City Chinese New Year Concert"), Burning (2004), From the Path of Beauty, Shuo.
- Violeta Dinescu (born 1953): Three string quartets (1973, 1974 and 1984).
- Jürg Frey (born 1953): String Quartet No. 1 (1988); (Unbetitelt) Nr.6 (1991); String Quartet No. 2 (1998–2000); String Quartet No. 3 (2012); String Quartet No. 4 (2020–21)
- Georg Friedrich Haas (born 1953): Eleven quartets, plus the short LAIR, written for the Arditti Quartet's fortieth anniversary. Quartets 3, 9, and 10 were meant to be performed in absolute darkness.
- Adriana Hölszky (born 1953): String Quartet (1975), Inner Worlds II for String Quartet (1981–82), Suspension bridges – String Quartet 'to Schubert', two string quartets, octets may be played simultaneously (1989–90).
- Cynthia Cozette Lee (born 1953): Paris String Quartet.
- Cindy McTee (born 1953): String Quartet No. 1 (1976; withdrawn), Adagio for String Quartet (2003).
- John Zorn (born 1953): Forbidden Fruit for voice, string quartet & turntables (1987), Cat o' Nine Tails (or, Tex Avery Directs the Marquis de Sade) (1988), The Dead Man (1990), Memento Mori (1992), Kol Nidre (1996), Necronomicon (2003), The Alchemist (2011); Pandora's Box (2014) (includes soprano part), The Remedy of Fortune (2015), The Unseen (2017).
- Sylvie Bodorová (born 1954): Dignitas homini, String quartet No. 1 (1987); Shofarot, String quartet No. 4 (2000).
- Elisabetta Brusa (born 1954): Belsize Op. 1 (1980–81).
- Joël-François Durand (born 1954): One quartet (2005).
- Beat Furrer (born 1954): Four (1984, 1988, 2004, 2021).
- Robert Greenberg (born 1954): Five string quartets: Breaths, Voices, and Cadenze (String Quartet No. 1) (1982); Child's Play (String Quartet No. 2) (1988); Among Friends (String Quartet No. 3) (1995); Snappy Rejoinder (String Quartet No. 4) (2005); It's Snowing (String Quartet No. 5) (2011)
- Cecilie Ore (born 1954): Praesens Subitus (amplified string quartet, 1989), Lex Temporis (amplified string quartet, 1992), Cirrus (2002), WaterWorks (2018), Glacier Song (2020), Morning Mist (2020).
- Arturo Rodas (born 1954): A – B – C – D (1989); Fuga Atonal II (2008).
- Sinan Savaskan (born 1954): Three quartets; his third quartet, Panic in Needle Park is for string quartet and for channel electro acoustic music.
- Carl Vine (born 1954) Six string quartets to date: Knips Suite (String Quartet No. 1) (1979); String Quartet No. 2 (1984); String Quartet No. 3 (1994); String Quartet No. 4 (2004); String Quartet No. 5 (2010); String Quartet No. 6 (Child's Play, 2017).
- John Woolrich (born 1954): Two quartets and 'A Book of Inventions'.
- David Garner (born 1954): Two quartets (2008 and 2015)
- David A. Jaffe (born 1955): Five quartets: Telegram to the President (1984); Grass Valley Fire (1988); Quiet Places (1996); Fox Hollow (2013); Eight O's in Wooloomooloo (2014, with contralto voice).
- Pascal Dusapin (born 1955): Seven quartets (1982, 1989, 1992, 1997, 2005, 2009, 2010); his sixth quartet is for string quartet and orchestra.
- Nigel Keay (born 1955): Two quartets (1983, 1995).
- Behzad Ranjbaran (born 1955): String Quartet No. 1 (1988).
- Karmella Tsepkolenko (born 1955): Glorification of the Four Elements for string quartet (1982).
- Sally Beamish (born 1956): String Quartet No 1 (1999); String Quartet No 2, opus California (1999); String Quartet No 3, Reed Stanzas (2011); String Quartet No. 4, Nine Fragments (2018).
- Eve de Castro-Robinson (born 1956): Pendulums (1997).
- Laura Kaminsky (born 1956): Six string quartets, Transformations (2000), Transformations II (2002), Monotypes (2005), American Nocturne (2009), Cadmium Yellow (2010), Rising Tide (2012).
- Iris Szeghy (born 1956): Musica dolorosa (1985), Aria (2016), Goldberg (2021).
- Miguel del Águila (born 1957): Three quartets: Presto II (1993); Life is a Dream (1995), recorded by Camerata San Antonio (CD Salon Buenos Aires).
- James Clarke (born 1957): Four quartets; No 1 (2003), No 2 (2009), No 3 (2014), No 4 (2017)
- Elena Kats-Chernin (born 1957): 25 string quartets.
- Bob Ostertag (born 1957): All the Rage (1992).
- Hilda Paredes (born 1957): UY U T’AN (1998), Cuerdas del destino (2008), Bitácora capilar (2013), Hacia una bitácora capilar (2014).
- Gerhard Präsent (born 1957): Four quartets: Music for Strings (1977/78); La Tâche (1994/95), Missa (2001); Big Apple (2007/08) – numbers 2, 3 and 4 recorded by the ALEA Ensemble.
- Linda Catlin Smith (born 1957): Six string quartets so far: Clay (1980), As you pass a reflective surface (1991), Folkestone (1997), Gondola (2006), Waterlily (2008), String Quartet #6 (2013).
- Rhona Clarke (born 1958): Three string quartets: Magnificat (1990), Pas de Quatre (2009), Edge (2017).
- Hanna Havrylets (1958–2022): Elegy for string quartet (1981), Memories for string quartet (1997), To Maria… for string quartet (1999), Expressions for string quartet (2004).
- Bent Sørensen (born 1958): Alman (1984), Adieu (1986), Angels’ Music (1988), The Lady of Shalott (1993), Schreie und Melancholie (1994).
- Errollyn Wallen (born 1958): Variations for String Quartet (1983), Second String Quartet (1988).
- Rodney Waschka II (born 1958): String Quartet: Laredo (1999) String Quartet: Ha! Fortune (2003) both recorded by the Nevsky String Quartet on Capstone Records.
- Julia Wolfe (born 1958): Four Marys (1991), Early that summer (1993), Dig Deep (1995), Blue Dress for string quartet (2015), Forbidden Love (4 percussion playing string quartet, 2019).
- Lawrence Dillon (born 1959): Invisible Cities String Quartet Cycle – String Quartet No. 1: Jests and Tenderness (1998); String Quartet No. 2: Flight (2002); String Quartet No. 3: Air (2005); String Quartet No. 4: The Infinite Sphere (2009); String Quartet No. 5: Through the Night (2009); String Quartet No. 6: REM (2014).
- Marti Epstein (born 1959): Blue Lines (1987); Puella Turbata (1997); Hidden Flowers (2012); Phosphenes (2017)
- James MacMillan (born 1959): Three string quartets.
- Shigeru Kan-no (born 1959): Ten string quartets as of 2008.
- Robert Scott Thompson (born 1959): Dissipative Structures for String Quartet (1981).
- Erkki-Sven Tüür (born 1959): String Quartet: in memoriam Urmas Kibuspuu (1985); String Quartet No. 2 (Lost Prayers) (2012).

=== Born in the 1960s ===
- Gregor Huebner (born 1967): Several string quartets.
- Caroline Charrière (1960–2018): Quatuor Ophelia (2006).
- Annie Gosfield (born 1960): Three string quartets: Lightheaded and Heavyhearted (2002); The Blue Horse Walks on the Horizon (2010); Signal Jamming and Random Interference, string quartet with sampler/electronics (2014).
- Aaron Jay Kernis (born 1960): Three string quartets: No. 1 Musica celestis (1990), No. 2 Musica instrumentalis (1998), No. 3 River (2015). He received the 1998 Pulitzer Prize for Quartet No. 2.
- Hanspeter Kyburz (born 1960): One string quartet (2004–05).
- William Susman (born 1960): Four string quartets.
- Mark-Anthony Turnage (born 1960): Twisted Blues with Twisted Ballad (2008) (String Quartet No. 1); Contusion (2013) (String Quartet No. 2); Shroud (2016) (String Quartet No. 3); Winter's Edge (2019) (String Quartet No 4); Split Apart (2020); Awake (2023)
- Ezequiel Viñao (born 1960): Three quartets, as of 2009: La Noche de las Noches (1989); The Loss and the Silence (2004) and Sirocco Dust (2009).
- Nicolas Bacri (born 1961): Nine string quartets: No. 1 Op. 1 "Fantaisie" (1980), No. 2 Op. 5 "5 Pieces" (1982), No. 3 Op. 18 "Esquisses pour un Tombeau" (1985–1989), No. 4 Op. 42 "Omaggio a Beethoven" (1989–1994), No. 5 Op. 57 (1997), No. 6 Op. 97 (2005–06), No. 7 Op. 101 "Variations sérieuses" (2006–07), No. 8 Op. 112 "Omaggio a Haydn" (2008–09), No. 9 Op. 140 "Canto di speranza", (2015).
- Unsuk Chin (born 1961): Parametastring for String Quartet and Tape (1995/96).
- Cindy Cox (born 1961): Columba aspexit, after Hildegard von Bingen (1997, revised 2002).
- Jorge Grundman (born 1961): Fragment for String Quartet (2004), Surviving a Son's Suicide (2009), God's Sketches for String Quartet, Soprano and Mallets (2012), On Blondes and Detectives. Cliché Music for String Quartet (2012), A Mortuis Resurgere: The Resurrection of Chris for Soprano and String Quartet (2013), The Propagation of Faith (2014), Villa Medicea di Pratolino. Cliché Music for String Quartet (2014).
- Hanna Kulenty (born 1961): Six quartets.
- Lowell Liebermann (born 1961): Five string quartets: String Quartet No. 1, Op. 5 (1979), String Quartet No. 2, Op. 60 (1998), String Quartet No. 3, Op. 102 (2007), String Quartet No. 4, Op. 103 (2007), and String Quartet No.5 Op. 126 (2014).
- Peter Machajdík (born 1961): To The Rainbow So Close Again (2004), Seas and Deserts (2015), Welcome! (2016), Terauchi (for String Quartet and Audio Playback, 2018), Passing Through Nothing (2021), This was blue (2021).
- Edgar Meyer (born 1961): Released an album mostly of string quartets, Short Trip Home (1999).
- Jesús Rueda (born 1961): 19 String Quartets (1989–2023).
- Karen Tanaka (born 1961): Metal Strings (1996), At the grave of Beethoven (1999)
- Michael Torke (born 1961): Great Crossing (1996), Chalk (1992), Corner in Manhattan (2000).
- Roland Dahinden (born 1962): Six quartets: String Quartet No.1, String Quartet No.2 (mind rock), String Quartet No.3 (mond see), String Quartet No.4 (flying white), String Quartet No.5 (poids de l'obre), String Quartet No.6 (whitish).
- Konstantia Gourzi (born 1962): String quartet no. 1, Op. 19, Israel (2004), String quartet no. 2, Op. 33/2, P-ILION, neun fragmente einer ewigkeit (2007), one touch, Op. 58 (2015), String quartet no. 3, Op. 61, Anájikon, the Angel in the Blue Garden (2015).
- Galina Grigorjeva (born 1962): Perpetuum mobile (I movement from the cycle Ad infinitum, 2008), Infinite Canon [Lõputu kaanon] (II movement from the cycle Ad infinitum, 2006).
- Jennifer Higdon (born 1962): Eight string quartets: Autumn's Cricket (1987), Voices (1993), Sky Quartet (1997 revised 2001), Amazing Grace (2003), Impressions (2003), Southern Harmony (2003), An Exultation of Larks (2005), Reel Time.
- Leonie Holmes (born 1962): Fragment II: for string quartet (2016).
- Victoria Poleva (born 1962): Walking on Waters (2013).
- Eric W. Sawyer (born 1962): 3 string quartets. Album: Albany Records, 2005, String Quartet 2 (1999), String Quartet 3 (2002).
- Laura Schwendinger (born 1962): Two string quartets:"String Quartet in Three Movements" (2001), Creature Quartet (2015)
- Fredrik Sixten (born 1962): Chaconne (2007) recorded by the Swedish radio. "Contrasts" for string quartet (1984).
- Andersen Viana (born 1962): Five quartets (1984, 1990, 1990, 1996, 1998).
- Graham Waterhouse (born 1962): composed string quartets, including Hungarian Polyphony (1986), Chinese Whispers (2010), Prophetiae Sibyllarum, Alcatraz (2014) and Alchymic Quartet (2022), among others.
- Ludmila Yurina (born 1962): Visions of St. John Baptist for string quartet (2004).
- Osvaldo Coluccino (born 1963): Aion (2002), Attimo (2007).
- Graham Fitkin (born 1963): Servant (1992); A Small Quartet (1993); Another Small Quartet (1993); Pawn (2005); Inside (2006); String (2008); Informal Dance (2010).
- Sophie Lacaze (born 1963): Het Lam Gods (2005).
- Isabel Mundry (born 1963): 11 Linien (1991–1992), no one (1994–1995), Linien, Zeichnungen (1999–2004).
- Elena Ruehr (born 1963): Twelve string quartets as to 2024.
- Julia Gomelskaya (1964–2016): N-Quartet (1995), From the Bottom of the Soul (1997).
- John Pickard (born 1964): five quartets; No 1 (1991), No 2 (1993), No 3 (1994), No 4 (1998), No 5 (2012)
- Annette Schlünz (born 1964): An eine Vernunft (1982).
- Matthew Taylor (born 1964): eight quartets; No 1 (1984), No 2 (1990), No 3 (1995), No 4 (1999), No 5 (2007), No 6 (2008), No 7 (2009), No 8 (2017)
- Augusta Read Thomas (born 1964): Sun Threads (1999–2002), Invocations (2000), Eagle at Sunrise (2001), Rise Chanting (2002), Helix Spirals (2015), Chi (2017).
- Ian Wilson (born 1964): Twenty-one string quartets; No 1 Winter's Edge (1992), No 2 The Capsizing Man and other stories (1994), No 3 Towards the far country (1997), No 4 Veer (2000), No 5 wander, darkling (2000), No 6 In fretta, in vento (2001), No 7 Lyric Suite (2004), No 8 unbroken white line (2007), No 9 heaven lay close (2009), No 10 Across a clear blue sky (2009), No 11 im Schatten (2010), No 12 Her charms invited (2010), No 13 Still life in green and red (2011), No 14 Tribe (2013), No 15 Alluvio (2014) No 16 Aus der Zauberküche (2014), No 17 Linte (2016), No 18 Up Above the World (2018), No 19 Rossiniana (2018), No 20 Capital (2019), No 21 Ground Out (2019)
- Dorothy Ker (born 1965): One string quartet, Perigean Tide.
- Georges Lentz (born 1965): “Caeli enarrant…” IV (1991–2000), String Quartet(s) (2000–2022).
- Charlotte Seither (born 1965): Corps croisé (2002).
- Dorothy Hindman (born 1966): The Road to Damascus (2010).
- Liza Lim (born 1966): Hell (1992), In the Shadow's Light (2004), The Weaver’s Knot (2014).
- Alla Zahaikevych (born 1966): String quartet (2009).
- Deirdre Gribbin (born 1967): Four string quartets: What The Whaleship Saw (2004), Merrow Sang (2008), Hearing Your Genes Evolve (2012), somewhere i have never travelled (2015, with or without film Collaboration with artist Esther Teichmann).
- Rebecca Saunders (born 1967): Fletch (2012), Unbreathed (2017).
- Katia Tiutiunnik (born 1967): Night Journey (2001).
- Isidora Žebeljan (1967–2020): Dark Velvet (in Memory of Gustav Mahler, 2005), Polomka Quartet (2009–2011).
- Kenneth Hesketh (born 1968): One string quartet, Sisyphus' punishment (Die Bestrafung des Sisyphos) (2011).
- Vanessa Lann (born 1968): "Lullabye for a Young Girl Dreaming" (1990); "Landscape of a Soul's Remembering" (2006).
- Olga Neuwirth (born 1968): Akroate Hadal (1995), settori (1999), in the realms of the unreal (2009).
- Ananda Sukarlan (born 1968) is perhaps the most prolific Asian composer for the string quartet genre, with repertoires ranging from easy and short pieces to complex 20-minute quartets, some with very unique sound influenced by Indonesia's folk music
- James Francis Brown (born 1969): One string quartet (2010).
- Nimrod Borenstein (born 1969). Meditation and Burlesque opus 43 (2013); Lullaby opus 81b (2018); Cieli d' Italia opus 88 (2019).
- Victoria Borisova-Ollas (born 1969): One string quartet, Creation of the Hymn.
- Johanna Doderer (born 1969): Four string quartets as of 2019.
- Peter Fribbins (born 1969): Two string quartets: String Quartet No. 1 I have the serpent brought (1990–1998 rev. 2002–2004); String Quartet No. 2 After Cromer (2006).
- Enno Poppe (born 1969): Tier (2002) for string quartet.
- Jonathan Powell (1969–2025): Two quartets.
- Eric Sessler (born 1969): String Quartet (2012–13).

=== Born in the 1970s ===
- Donnacha Dennehy (born 1970): Ecstasis, full stop (1999), Counting (2000), Pushpulling (2007), Stamp (2008), One Hundred Goodbyes (2011), The Weather of It (2016), Wig (2021).
- Ralph Farris (born 1970): 2fer (2008), Wreck'd (2009), Factions (2013).
- David Horne (born 1970): Surrendering to the Stream (1993), Undulations (1996), Subterfuge, String Quartet No. 3 Flight from the Labyrinth (2005), String Quartet No. 4 (2006).
- Fred Momotenko (born 1970): Liquid pArTs (2005), Essere preso nel gorgo della passione (2008) for string quartet and percussion.
- Fazıl Say (born 1970): String Quartet, Op. 29 (2010).
- Arlene Sierra (born 1970): Insects in Amber (2010).
- Aleksandra Vrebalov (born 1970): At least 18 string quartets, many of them in collaboration with the Kronos Quartet.
- Lotta Wennäkoski (born 1970): Culla d’aria (2004), Metsäkoulu (2009, speaking string quartet), Pige (2021/2022).
- Thomas Adès (born 1971): Arcadiana (1994), The Four Quarters (2010).
- Richard Carrick (born 1971): Adagios for Strings (2010).
- Lior Navok (born 1971): Voices from India (String Quartet No. 1) (1997), Hope Cycles (String Quartet No. 2) (2004), Whispered Questions (String Quartet No. 3) (2010).
- Ingrid Stölzel (born 1971): Impulse for string quartet (1999).
- Yitzhak Yedid (born 1971): 'Visions, Fantasies and Dances' 60 minutes in 7 parts (2007).
- Craig Walsh (born 1971): 'String Quartet No. 1' (2010).
- Gabriela Lena Frank (born 1972): Leyendas: An Andean Walkabout (string quartet or string orchestra, 2001), Inkarrí (Inca Rey) (2005), Quijotadas (2007), Milagros (2010), Kanto Kechua No. 2 (2018).
- Edward Top (born 1972): Two string quartets (1998, 2002).
- Helena Tulve (born 1972): nec ros, nec pluvia… (2004).
- Lera Auerbach (born 1973): No. 1, No. 2 Primera Luz (2005), No. 3 Cetera Desunt (2006), No. 4 Findings – 16 Inventions (2007), No. 5 Songs of Alkonost (2011), No. 6 Farewell (2012), No. 7 Désir (2013), No. 8 Sylvia's's Diary (2013), No. 9 Thanksgiving (2020), No. 10 Frozen Dreams (2020), Epilogue in one movement (2005).
- Eivind Buene (born 1973): Three Quartets (1998–2000), Grid (2006).
- Tansy Davies (born 1973): Nightingales: Ultra Deep Field (2020).
- Yalil Guerra (born 1973): Three string quartets: String Quartet No. 1, "A Mil Guerras Solo", String Quartet No. 2, and String Quartet No. 3 "In memoriam Ludvig van Beethoven"
- Airat Ichmouratov (born 1973). Four quartets. No 1 (2003); No 2 (2004); No 3 (2010); No 4 (2013)
- Žibuoklė Martinaitytė (born 1973): 5 Pieces for string quartet (1991), String Quartet (1993), Illusions of time and space for string quartet and tape (2006).
- Maja Ratkje (born 1973): Tale of Lead and Light (2011).
- Sarah Kirkland Snider (born 1973): Ave (2002).
- Henry Vega (born 1973): The motion of arrayed emotion (2011), for string quartet and computers.
- Jörg Widmann (born 1973): String Quartets 1–5 (1997–2005) that form one cycle (No. 5 includes soprano voice); String Quartets 6–10 (Study on Beethoven I, II, III, IV, V) (2019/2020).
- Jefferson Friedman (born 1974): Three string quartets (1996, 1999, 2005).
- Claudia Molitor (born 1974): Und lass Dir… (2014).
- Joseph Phibbs (born 1974): Three quartets. No 1 (2014); No 2 (2015); No 3 (2018).
- Jennifer Walshe (born 1974): :blurt (1997), MARLOWE S. (2009; for string quartet, tape recorder and CD), THEY LEFT HIM IN THE OCEAN (2014; for string quartet and DVD).
- Helena Winkelman (born 1974): Quadriga Quartett (2011), Papa Haydn’s Parrot (2016), The Clock (2016).
- Kati Agócs (born 1975): String Quartet No. 1, Tantric Variations (2016), String Quartet No. 2, Imprimatur (2018).
- R. Luke DuBois (born 1975): Hard Data (2009).
- Vivian Fung (born 1975): String Quartet No. 1 (the third movement, Pizzicato, may be performed as a separate work for string quartet; 2004), No. 2 (2009), No. 3 (2013), No. 4 (2019).
- David Philip Hefti (born 1975): Ph(r)asen – String Quartet No. 1 (2007); Guggisberg-Variationen – String Quartet No. 2 (2008); Mobile – String Quartet No. 3 (2011); con fuoco – String Quartet No. 4 (2011); Concubia nocte – Music for the Second Nocturnal Vigil – String Quartet No. 5 (2018); Five Scenes for Gustav - String Quartet No. 6 (2020); To the End of Time - String Quartet No. 7 (2023); Songs of Yearning - String Quartet No. 8 (2024).
- Gilda Lyons (born 1975): Bone Needles II (2006).
- Svitlana Azarova (born 1976): Hotel Charlotte (2005), for string quartet.
- Kasia Glowicka (born 1976): "Springs and Summers" (1999), for string quartet and countertenor, music set to Shakespeare's sonnets.
- Yotam Haber (born 1976): Torus (2012), From the Book (2016)
- David Flynn (born 1977): Three string quartets to date. String Quartet No. 1 "Fairground Attractions" (2003), String Quartet No. 2 "The Cranning" (2004–2005), String Quartet No. 3 "The Keening" (2007).
- Santa Ratniece (born 1977): Aragonite (2005), Alvéoles (2005), Silsila (2013).
- Kerry Andrew (born 1978): tInItUs sOnGs for string quartet and recorded spoken word (2018).
- Emily Hall (born 1978): time back for time given (2004), braid (2007), from listening to trees (2008).
- Jimmy López (born 1978): String quartet "La Caresse du Couteau" (2004).
- Anna Meredith (born 1978): Songs for the M8 (2005), Chorale for string quartet and sampled MRI scanner (2010), A Short Tribute to Teenage Fanclub (2013), Tuggemo for string quartet and electronics (2017).
- Annesley Black (born 1979): "Folds Dependent" (2003).
- Linda Buckley (born 1979): "Latitude Longitude" (2007) and "Beethoven Reflected" (2019), in addition "Haza" (2016) for string quartet and tape.
- Joseph Hallman (born 1979): Many string quartets for multiple groups, including "the not-so-magnificent cadaver", "musings", and "compliments". Also notable are his transcriptions of contemporary pop songs for gospel singer and string quartet.
- Emily Howard (born 1979): Two string quartets, "Afference" (2014), "Four Musical Proofs and a Conjecture" (2017).
- Kate Moore (born 1979): Sketches of Stars (2000), Violins & Skeletons for string quartet + three recorded string quartets, or four string quartets (2010), Cicadidae (2019).
- Dinesh Subasinghe (born 1979): "Night Before the Battle" (2011).

=== Born in the 1980s ===
- Anna Clyne (born 1980): Roulette (2007; for string quartet and tape), Shadow of the Words (2010; for string quartet and tape), Primula Vulgaris (2010), Breathing Statues for String Quartet (2020), Woman Holding a Balance (2020).
- Cheryl Frances-Hoad (born 1980): My Day in Hell (2008), Invocatio (2017).
- Missy Mazzoli (born 1980): Harp and Altar (for string quartet and electronics, 2009), Death Valley Junction (2010), You Know Me From Here (2012), Quartet for Queen Mab (for string quartet and optional electronic delay, 2015), Enthusiasm Strategies (2019).
- Tyshawn Sorey (born 1980): Everything Changes, Nothing Changes (2020); For Grachan Moncur III (2023)(string quartet and percussion).
- Dobrinka Tabakova (born 1980): On a bench in the shade (2004), The Smile of the Flamboyant Wings (2010), Organum light (2014).
- Alexandra Fol (born 1981): String Quartet op. 42-D (2006), The ELGEA Quartet (2013).
- Helen Grime (born 1981): String Quartet No. 1 (2014), String Quartet No. 2 (2021).
- Jessie Montgomery (born 1981): Strum (2006; revised 2012), Voodoo Dolls (2008), Break Away (2013), Source Code (2014).
- Richard Zarou (born 1981): String Quartet "Retreating From the Light" (2003).
- Charlotte Bray (born 1982): Ungrievable Lives (2021/22).
- Joey Roukens (born 1982): String Quartet No. 1 (2003), Earnest and Game (String Quartet No. 2, 2007), Visions at Sea (String Quartet No. 3, 2011) What Remains (String Quartet no. 4, 2019).
- Caroline Shaw (born 1982): Punctum (2009, revised 2013), Entr'acte (2011), Valencia (2012), Plan & Elevation: The Grounds of Dumbarton Oaks (2015), Blueprint (2016), First Essay: Nimrod (2016), Second Essay: Echo and Third Essay: Ruby (2018), The Evergreen (2020).
- Ann Cleare (born in 1983): One string quartet, moil (2010).
- Hannah Kendall (born 1984): Glances / I Don't Belong Here: (2019).
- Prach Boondiskulchok (born 1985): "Ritus" (2018).
- Mohammed Fairouz (born 1985): Lamentation and Satire (2008), Chorale Fantasy (2010) and The Named Angels (2012).
- Julia Adolphe (born 1988): Between the Accidental (2010), Veil of Leaves (2014), Star-Crossed Signals (2018).
- Cecilia Damström (born 1988): Via Crucis, Op. 34 (2012–2014), Letters – String Quartet No. 2, Op. 61 (2018).
- Sky Macklay (born 1988): Many Many Cadences (2016); Vertebrae (2019).
- Freya Waley-Cohen (born 1989): String Quartet (2017).

=== Born in the 1990s ===
- Caio Facó (born 1992): Cangaceiros e Fanáticos (2018)
- Edward W. Hardy (born 1992): Evil Eye, A Fantasy (second and third movements from "Three Pieces Inspired by Edgar Allan Poe (2018). Vengeance (2018). Flying (Dancing in Spanish Harlem) (2019). Strange Fruit (2020).

== See also ==
- List of piano composers
