= Walter F. Craig =

American violinist

Walter F Craig
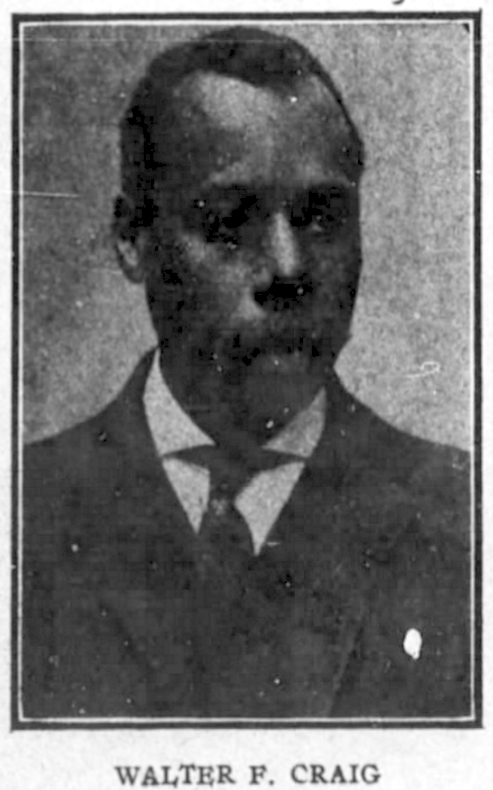
- Craig in 1909
- Born: December 20, 1854; Princeton, New Jersey, U.S.
- Died: February 8, 1933 (aged 78); Brooklyn, New York, U.S.
- Occupation: Musician
- Spouse: Bertie Toney-Craig

Walter F. Craig (December 20, 1854 – January 25, 1933) was a violin soloist and orchestra director in New York City. His career started in 1870 and continued until the 1930s. He was known for his performance and interpretation of classical music, but he also was popular performing at dances.

== Early life ==
Walter F. Craig was born in Princeton, New Jersey on December 20, 1854, to Charles A. and Sarah E. Craig. He moved to New York City in 1861 where he went to Colored School No. 7 under principal Charlotte Smith, who was succeeded upon her death in 1863 by Mrs. Sarah J. Smith Tompkins Garnet; by the time Craig graduated in 1869, the school's name had been changed to Colored School No. 4. He began to study violin in 1868 and held his first concert at Cooper Union in 1870. His musical training was under Hermon Troste, Edward Mollenhauer, and Carl Christian Muller.

== Career ==
His musical career took off and he organized what was known as "Craig's Orchestra" in 1872. His orchestra began to tour widely and he also became internationally famous as a violin soloist. As a musician, he became associated with a number of prominent vocalists including women: Madame Selika, Nelly Brown Mitchell, Adelaide G. Smith, Flora Batson, Emma Azalia Hackley and Sissieretta Jones and men: L. L. Brown, William I. Powell, Thomas Chestnut, and Harry Burleigh. His compositions were also well known. He became concert master at the Mendellsohn School of Music and he was the first black conductor to be a member of the Musical Mutual Protective Union of New York City. Craig's orchestra was over half white until about 1911, and the union was criticized for not supporting Craig as much as he supported it and white musicians because Craig was black. By 1887, his orchestra included 75 musicians. In 1893 he was elected a member of the Antonín Dvořák-led National Conservatory of Music of America. Later in his career, Craig became well known for introducing African American musicians to the stage. For example, in January 1915 he featured Roland Hayes in Hayes' premier New York shows.

Craig was famous for a number of annual musical concerts. His first annual Christmas reception occurred in 1880 and continued into the early 1900s. Similarly, in 1880 he presented his first Annual May Festival which also continued into the 1900s. Possibly the most well renowned annual concert was his pre-lenten reception which took place at Palm Garden in New York and continued into the 1910s.

Craig was at the front rank of musicianship among African-Americans and New Yorkers. His work frequently interpreted classical composors with "exceptional feeling and fidelity" and was important in shaping the musical tastes of African-Americans in New York City. His abilities stretched beyond classical composition and his orchestra was in great demand for dance programs.

== Family and death ==
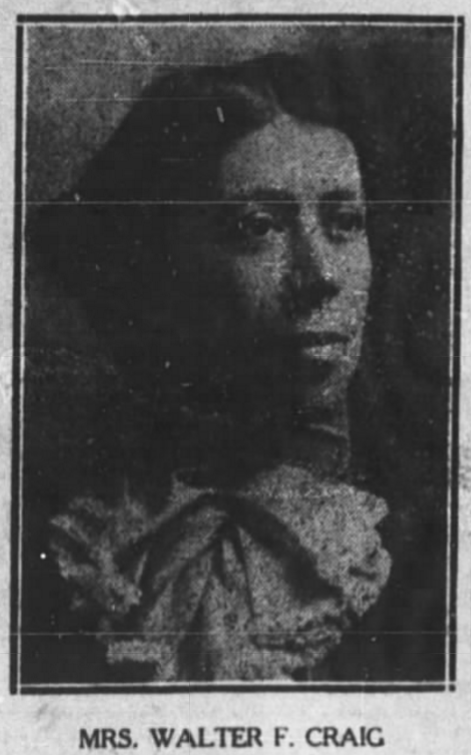
Bertie Toney-Craig in 1909

On December 14, 1898, Craig married Britannia T. Davis, an elocutionist known professionally as Bertie Toney (and sometimes thereafter as Bertie Toney-Craig), who had a daughter from her previous marriage, Elsie Davis. Together, the couple had second daughter, Ruth Craig. Bertie died at their Brooklyn home, 483 Hancock Street, on May 16, 1919., and the following year he married the recently widowed former singer Minerva "Minnie" Skanks Conick, whose late husband, Edward Gearing Conick, had been the recording secretary of The Frogs (club), a Harlem-based association of African American theatrical professionals. Later in his life, Craig worked as a violin teacher Craig died on January 25, 1933, at Kings County Hospital in Brooklyn.

== Works ==
- Selika Galop – dedicated to Madame Selika
- Arneaux March – Written for and dedicated to the dramas of John A. Arneaux
- Excelsior – A grand march
