= Edward Mollenhauer =

American violinist and composer

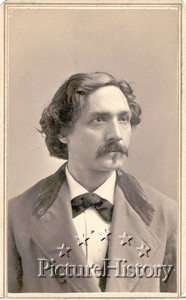
Photo of Edward Mollenhauer (circa 1870) by J. B. Gardner from PictureHistory.com

Edward Mollenhauer (1827–1914) was an American violinist and composer.

== Biography ==
Mollenhauer was born in Erfurt, Prussia. He studied under Heinrich Wilhelm Ernst and Louis Spohr, and had become famous in Germany and at Saint Petersburg before he was twenty-five years old. To escape conscription, he went to England, where he met conductor Louis-Antoine Jullien, and accompanied him to New York City in 1853. He settled there and became a founder in America of the Conservatory method of teaching the violin. Mollenhauer's best-known compositions for the violin are his quartets. He also wrote the operas, The Corsican Bride (1861), Love among the Breakers (also known as Down among the Breakers; 1878), and The Masked Ball (also known as The Wager; 1879). He soloed with the New York Philharmonic Orchestra for six years. He also created 2 pieces for violin with piano accompaniment, "The Boy Paganini" and "The Infant Paganini" both are still played worldwide. Among those he taught were African-American soloist and orchestra director, Walter F. Craig.

== See also ==
- List of string quartet composers
