= Prach Boondiskulchok =

British composer

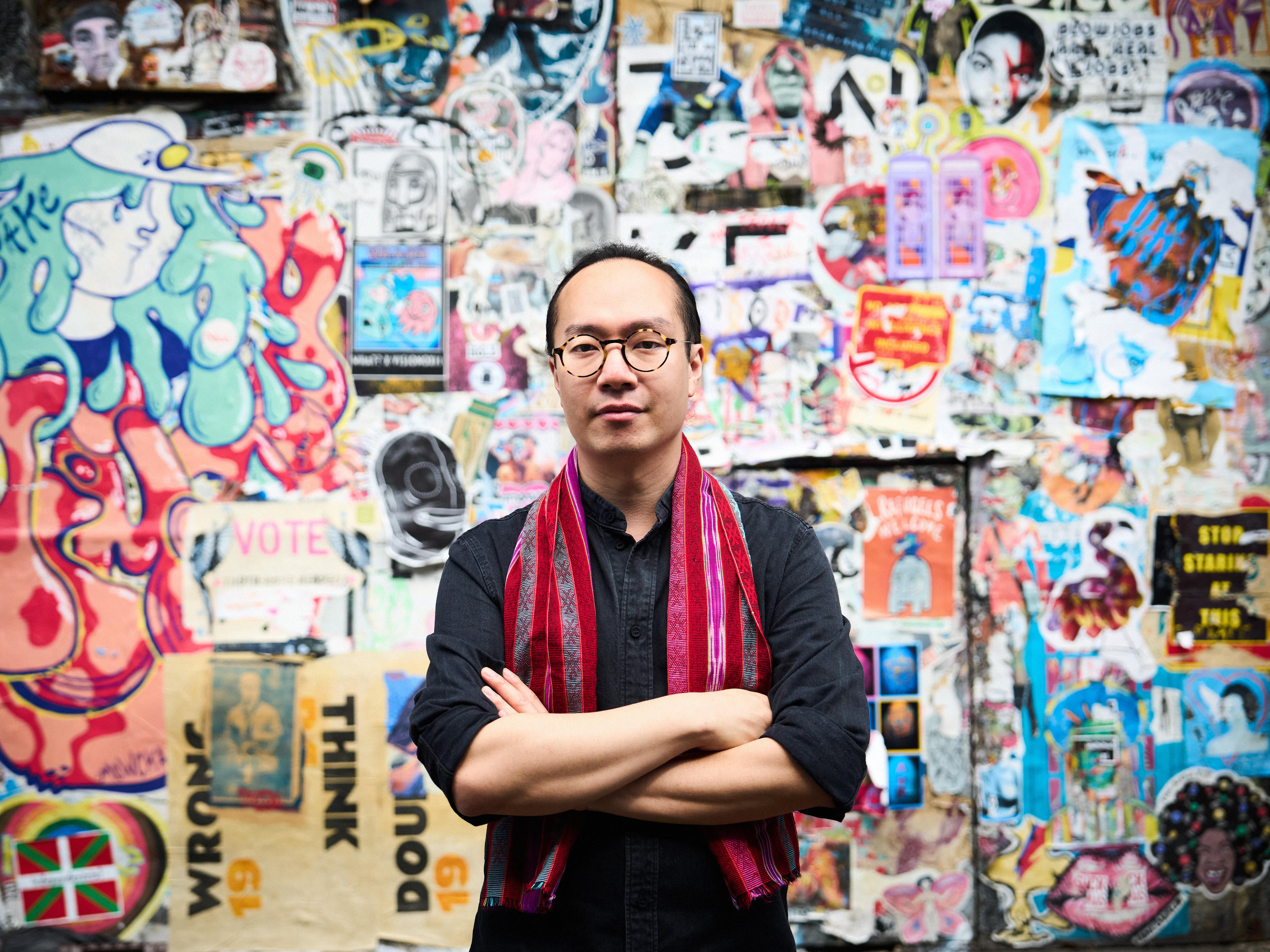

Background information
- Born: Bangkok, Thailand
- Occupation: Composer
- Instrument: piano

Prach Boondiskulchok (IPA in English: [prɐt͡ʃ] Thai: ปรัชญ์ บุญดีสกุลโชค) is a Thai-British composer and pianist based in Europe, and active in the United Kingdom (Trinity Laban Conservatoire of Dance and Music, Royal College of Music), Germany (Linos Piano Trio and Festival), Netherlands and Belgium.

== Education ==
Prach attended Satit Chula School in Bangkok. At the age of 14 he moved to the United Kingdom and studied piano and composition at the specialist music school, the Yehudi Menuhin School, and later completed his higher music education at London’s Guildhall School of Music and Drama under Royal Patronage of the Princess Galyani Vadhana and later at the Hochschule für Musik, Theater und Medien Hannover. Between 2017-2021 he was a resident researcher at the Orpheus Instituut, Ghent.

== Composer ==
Prach’s compositional language explores the layers and contradictions of the sound worlds he encounters through his multiple musical identities: a Bangkok-born musician grown up with both Western and Thai classical traditions, an internationally active pianist, and a researcher entangled in the boundaries between historical performance practices and microtonal music. While embracing influences as diverse as Buddhist chanting, Josquin des Prez, Piphat traditions, Maurice Ravel, Harry Partch and Gérard Grisey, Prach’s scores prioritise intelligibility and emotional immediacy.

In 2025, he was a resident composer with Het Muziek (formerly Asko|Schönberg Ensemble) conducting research and development of a new opera — Burmese Days, which will have its premiere in 2027. His monodrama Lesson for voice and piano will have its premiere at the Opera Forward Festival (Dutch National Opera x Muziekgebouw, Amsterdam) in March 2026.

Recent works include a half-concert-length ensemble piece Ciaccona and Other Debauched Dances (2024) which premiered at the 2024 MA Festival Bruges (Belgium) and the Ars Musica Festival (Belgium); Karmic Songs (2023) commissioned by Camerata Variabile (Switzerland) for soprano Malin Hartelius; and Ligatures for string trio (2021) commissioned by and premiered at the IMS Open Chamber Music (Prussia Cove, UK).

In 2019, Prach was commissioned a string quartet by the Endellion String Quartet for its 40th Anniversary alongside Sally Beamish, Jonathan Dove, and Giles Swayne. The second section of the third movement of this work, Ritus: Four Portraits for String Quartet, is the first example of Prach's integration of Thai heptatonic tuning into a Western classical ensemble, using quarter-tone approximations divided between the players. Since then, elements of the heptatonic practice have been one of his principal topics of exploration.

== Pianist ==
Prach is active primarily as a pianist of chamber music. He is a founding member of the Linos Piano Trio. The trio ensemble pioneered Accompanied Keyboard Sonatas of Carl Philipp Emanuel Bach, recording the first complete set of the thirteen works in the composer's centenary year in 2014. While the Linos Piano Trio performs both on modern and historical instruments, their choice of recording Bach on modern instruments was partly an attempt to integrate the repertoire into the mainstream. The ensemble's second album Stolen Music (2021), produced in partnership with Bayerischer Rundfunk and Deutsche Grammophon, received critical acclaim for its innovative transcriptions of Paul Dukas's The Sorcerer's Apprentice and Maurice Ravel's La valse.

In 2024-2026 the Linos Piano Trio is recording the complete Ludwig van Beethoven piano trios on three different historical pianos in collaboration with SWR.

A passionate educator and scholar, Prach served as a faculty member at the Yehudi Menuhin School (2010-2015), Royal College of Music, London (2017-2025) and The Hague's Royal Conservatory (2020-2025). He was a research fellow at the Orpheus Institute, Belgium, working on historical keyboards with Tom Beghin (2017-2021). Prach has served on the jury of the Geelvinck International Fortepiano Competition, Birmingham International Chamber Music Competition, he has been an Artist-in-Residence at the Trinity Laban Conservatoire of Music and Dance with his ensemble, the Linos Piano Trio.

== Published works ==
All works published by Composers Edition
Name of work	Instrumentation	Year of composition
Piano Trio No. 1 "Night Suite"	Piano trio	2014
The Devil of Symmetry	Piano	2017
A Bao A Qu’s Stairs	Piano	2018
The Remora	Piano	2018
Ritus (Seasons)	String quartet	2018
Squonk Diptych	Portative organ	2019
Träumerei	Piano trio, clarinet	2019
Inventions	any keyboard instrument	2020
The Work	SATB choir	2020
Piano Quartet "Games"	violin, viola, cello and piano with toy instruments	2021
Ligatures	String trio	2021
Chopin Fantasy	Piano six hands	2022
Piano Trio No. 2 "Songs Without Words"	Piano trio	2022
Karmic Songs	voice, theremin, violin, viola, cello and piano	2023
Danse Macabre	Piano left-hand, clarinet and string trio	2023
Ciaccona and Other Debauched Dances	flute, clarinet, cello, guitar and accordion	2024
