= Maria de Lourdes Martins =

Maria de Lourdes Martins (26 May 1926 – 31 August 2009) was a Portuguese pianist and composer.

== Life ==
Maria de Lourdes Martins was born in Lisbon, Portugal, the daughter of Lisbon Conservatory teacher Maria Helena Martins. Martins studied at the Lisbon Conservatory with Abreu Mota, Macário Santiago Kastner and Marcos Garin where she would obtain degrees in piano in 1944, and composition in 1949. . She continued her studies in composition with Artur Santos and Jorge Croner de Vasconcellos. here she would learn about Orff-Schulwerk, a child centered music education approach which she would take to Portugal and introduce there. While in Munich she would meet Professor Genzmer who made her aware of the education program. Genzmer also made her aware of the Gulbenkian foundation which funded the Orff-Schulwerk program in Portugal. She would continue her education by acquiring a scholarship from the Gulbenkian foundation and would learn the Kodaly method in the country of Hungary.

After completing her studies, Martins took a position teaching at the Lisbon Conservatory. She introduced the Orff-Schulwerk system from the Salzburg Mozarteum in Portugal, and won the Calouste Gulbenkian Foundation Composition Award two times. In 1972 she would found the associação portuguesa de educação musical , otherwise known as the Portuguese Association of Musical Education. This organization is affiliated with the I.S.M.E. which would award her these awards in order for composition. "Carlos Seixas" (1959), "Juventude Portuguesa" (1960),

== Works ==
Selected works include:

- A string quartet (1952)
- Cromos for violin (1958)
- Sonatina para Quinteto de Soporo (1959)
- 12 harmonizations of popular songs for choir a capella (1959)
- Pezzo Grotesco (1959)
- O Encoberto (1965)
- Divertimento para Quinteto de Soporo (1967)
- Sonarita (1970)
- Convergencias (1970)
- O Litoral (1971)
- Suite de Dancas Tradicionais Portuguesas (1978)
- Três Máscaras (Three Masks, 1984), opera
- A Donzela Guerreira (The Battling Maiden, 1995), opera
- Pedagogical music for Orff (Date not listed)
