= Agnes Tyrrell =

Czech composer and pianist

Agnes Tyrrell (20 September 1846 – 18 April 1883) was a composer and pianist of English and Czech descent.

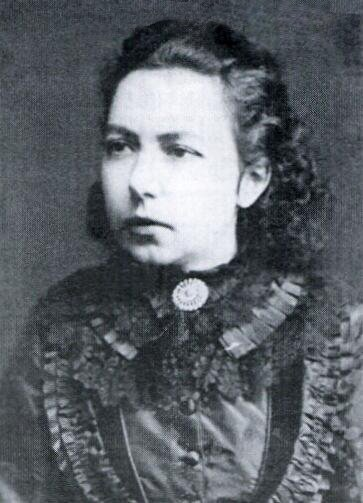
Agnes Tyrrell

== Life ==
Agnes Tyrrell was born in Brno, the regional capital of Moravia in the Austro-Hungarian Empire. She was the daughter of English teacher Henry Foster Tyrrell, who had established himself among the German-speaking community of Brno, and his Czech wife Josefína Kotulánová. Agnes Tyrrell grew up speaking English, German, and Czech fluently. A child prodigy, she performed in her first piano recital at nine, and attended the Vienna Conservatory at sixteen. She studied piano with Adalbert Pacher in Vienna and composition with Anton Bruckner's teacher Otto Kitzler in Brno. She had to give up an active career as a pianist due to failing health (heart problems), and instead devoted her short life to composition

== Oeuvre ==
Tyrrell was a prolific composer. During her fairly short life (she was 36 when she died), she composed 39 compositions for piano solo, 55 vocal compositions ranging from songs to choral music, oratorio and opera, and several major orchestral works. Tyrrell was one of the few women to compose a symphony before 1900. In 2018, her Overture in C Minor received a world premiere performance by the Orchester L'anima giusta conducted by Jessica Horsley at the Frauenkomponiert Festival in Bern and recorded by Swiss Radio. It is the only known recording of Tyrrell's orchestral music. Many of Tyrrell's autograph scores are held in the Moravian Museum of Brno, some of her songs and song-cycles in Berlin's State Library. Tyrrell's catalogue of published works is maintained by the Kapralova Society.

== List of Works ==
=== Works for piano ===
- Andante, op. 6 (publ. Certosa Verlag)
- Theme and Variations in F Major, op. 8 (publ. Kapralova Society, 2021)
- Allegro di bravura, op. 9 (publ. Ries & Erler, 2021)
- Piano Sonata, op. 10
- Impromptu No. 1, op. 11 (publ. Ries & Erler, 2021)
- Impromptu no. 2, op. 12 (publ. Ries & Erler, 2021)
- Mazurka, op. 15 (1st edition published by Spina in Vienna, year?; 2nd edition Certosa Verlag)
- Nocturnes No. 1 and No. 2, op. 16 and 17, for piano (published by Spina in Vienna, year?)
- Vier Albumblätter, op. 18 (publ. Ries & Erler, 2021)
- Lied ohne Worte, op. 23 (publ. Ries & Erler, 2021)
- Impromptu No. 3, op. 32(a) (publ. Ries & Erler, 2021)
- Rondo for piano (IMSLP)
- Zwölf grosse Studien (12 etudes), op. 48 for piano, dedicated to Liszt (published in Vienna by Fr. Schreiber, c.1872)
- Groβe Sonate, op. 66 (publ. Kapralova Society, 2021, rev. 2022)
- Clavierstück, op. 67 (publ. Ries & Erler, 2021)

=== Chamber music ===
- String quartet in G Major (publ. Certosa Verlag, 2023)

=== Orchestral works ===
- Overture in E flat Major
- Mazurka for orchestra
- Overture in C Minor
- Symphony in C Major

=== Vocal and vocal-instrumental works ===
==== Songs ====
- Die Berge der Heimat, Künftiger Frühling, op. 1
- Vöglein im Walde, op. 2 (IMSLP)
- Meg, op. 11/1 (IMSLP)
- 2 Lieder, op. 19
- 4 Lieder, op. 20
- Ruhe in der Geliebten, op. 21
- 3 Lieder, op. 24
- Mägdelein im Wald, op. 25
- Winter, op. 26
- 3 Lieder, op. 28
- Der erfrorene Knabe, op. 30
- Wanderlied, op. 31 (IMSLP)
- 2 Gesänge, op. 33 (publ. Ries & Erler, 2023)
- Abschied, op. 36
- Sehnsucht, op. 37
- Lied des Wanderburschen im Walde, op. 41
- Abendfeier, op. 46 (IMSLP)
- Das Mädchen im Radboot, op. 50
- 3 Lieder, op. 51
- An den Mond, op. 53 (IMSLP)
- Beim Wandern, Lenzspruch, op. 55
- 5 Lieder, op. 59
- Trübe wird's die Wolken eilen, op. 62
- 5 Schilflieder (1876)

==== Choral ====
- 5 Gesänge für Gemischten Chor (Sommerfrühe, Sonntags am Rhein, Vorüber, Abschied, Liebestpredigt)
- Schlaflied (publ. Ries & Erler, 2023)
- Auf dem See (publ. Ries & Erler, 2023)
- Lied vom Rhein
- Mailied (publ. Ries & Erler, 2023)
- Sehnsucht, Lied vom Rhein
- Fuge (publ. Ries & Erler, 2023)
- Gebet
- Mutterthränen
- Winterlied

==== Vocal with orchestra ====
- Opera: Bertran de Born (libretto by Franz Keim is an adaptation of the namesake ballad of Ludwig Uhland)
- Oratorio: Die Könige in Israel (libretto by Wilhem Smets), unfinished

== Discography ==
- Agnes Tyrrell. Ein Hauch vom Paradies. Choral Music and Piano Works. Kyra Steckeweh, piano; GewandhausChor Leipzig, Gregor Meyer. CPO 555 652-2 (2025). Recorded 2023.

== Bibliography ==
- Chmelová, Věra. Klavírní tvorba Agnes Tyrrell. (Piano compositions of Agnes Tyrrell.) Opus Musicum 38, no. 4 (2006): 15–20.
- Fukac, Jiri. "Agnes Tyrrellova - zapomenuty zjev moravske romantiky". (Agnes Tyrrell - a forgotten phenomenon of Moravian Romanticism.) Opus Musicum 3, nos. 9-10 (1971): 269–278.
- Sadie, Julie Anne and Rhian Samuel. The Norton/Grove Dictionary of Women Composers. New York: W.W. Norton & Company, 1994.
- Schulmeisterová, Martina. Agnes Tyrrell, Život a dílo. (Agnes Tyrrell, life and work.) Dissertation. Janáček Academy of Performing Arts Faculty of Music, Brno, 2003.
- Schulmeisterová, Martina. Život a klavírní dílo Agnes Tyrrell. Pianissimo 1 no. 3 (2015): 3–7.
- Šnajdrová, Blanka. Agnes Tyrrell. Brněnská skladatelka a její smíšené sbory v ODH MZM. (Brno composer Agnes Tyrrell and her choral music for mixed choir.) Master's Thesis. Institute of Musicology, Masaryk University Faculty of Philosophy, Brno, 2019.
