= Charles Hommann =

American composer

Charles Hommann (July 25, 1803-?1872) was an American composer. A native of Philadelphia, he was among the first American-born composers to produce chamber and orchestral music successfully.

== Life ==
Charles Hommann was the son of John C. Hommann and his wife Constantia. His father, who had immigrated to the United States from Germany in the 1790s, worked as a music promoter and publisher in Philadelphia.

Charles Hommann was one of the first American composers to be trained exclusively in the United States, though his musical training likely came mostly from his German father. Early in his career, Charles held positions at St James's Church and the Third Dutch Reformed Church in Philadelphia.

As a violinist and violist for the Musical Fund Society of Philadelphia, Hommann was exposed to the works of the major European composers of his time. His own music was performed by the Bethlehem Philharmonic Society as well as the Philadelphia Philharmonic Society, and he won a gold medal prize from the latter for his overture in D in 1835.

Hommann moved to New York around 1854, where his music was performed at chamber music concerts given by the New York American-Music Association. Although his music was relatively unknown by the time of his death, he left behind a significant body of orchestral, chamber, and church music that is important for the early history of American musical composition.
