= Louise Haenel de Cronenthall =

Louise Augusta Marie Julia Haenel de Cronenthall (18 January 1839 – 9 March 1896) was a German composer who lived and worked in France.

== Life ==
Louise Haenel de Cronenthall was born in Graz, Austria, the daughter of piano maker Franz Julius Hänel (1804–1871), and moved to Paris to study at the Conservatoire at age 17. She studied with Alexandre Joseph Désiré Tariot (1803–1872) for music theory, Camille-Marie Stamaty (1811–1870) for piano, Auguste-Joseph Franchomme (1808–1884) for cello, and Jules Demersseman (1833–1866) for flute and composition. In 1862 she married Léonce du Trousset, marquis d'Héricourt de Valincourt (1822–1889).

Haenel received a medal for her work in the Paris World Fair of 1867. She died in Paris.

== Works ==
Louise Haenel de Cronenthall was a very productive composer. Selected compositions include:

- La nuit d'épreuve (The Eight samples) opera, 1867
- La Chanson du Thé
- Cremonese, string quartet
- La cinquantaine villageoise (The Golden Peasant Wedding), symphony
- Salute au printemps (spring greeting), symphony
- La fantastique (The Great), symphony
- Appolonia, symphony
- Bonheur pastoral (pastoral happiness), symphony
