= Iet Stants =

Dutch composer (1903–1968)

Hendrika Henriëtte Cornelia Stants
- Born: 17 January 1903; Utrecht, Holland
- Died: 3 February 1968 (aged 65); Culemborg, Holland
- Other name: Iet Stants
- Education: Toonkunst Music School
- Spouse: Leendert Sillevis (m. 1938)

Hendrika Henriëtte Cornelia Stants, known as Iet Stants, (17 January 1903 - 3 February 1968) was a Dutch composer.

From 1919 she studied at the Toonkunst music school in Utrecht and her first compositions – three songs, a string quartet, and three piano pieces survive from 1920. In 1921 she wrote a second quartet, a piano quintet, a parody opera, and a pastorale for orchestra. In 1925 she completed only a piano trio and a choir piece. Insecure and disillusioned she decided to stop composing. She took an office job and composed only sporadically.

In October 1938 Stants married Leendert Sillevis from Culemborg, a widower fourteen years older than her. She began to compose again: a concerto grosso for flute, cello and string orchestra in 1940 and a suite for small orchestra in 1942.

After the war Stants dedicated herself to music education and related social activities. Among other things, she became active as a board member and in the cultural and spiritual committee of Het Nederlandse Padvindersgilde (Dutch Girl-pathfinders Guild).
