= List of string quartets by Wolfgang Amadeus Mozart =

Where is K 406 and K 516

This is a list of string quartets by Wolfgang Amadeus Mozart.

- String Quartet No. 1 in G major, K. 80/73f
- String Quartet No. 2 in D major, K. 155/134a
- String Quartet No. 3 in G major, K. 156 (K. 134b)
- String Quartet No. 4 in C major, K. 157
- String Quartet No. 5 in F major, K. 158
- String Quartet No. 6 in B♭ major, K. 159
- String Quartet No. 7 in E♭ major, K. 160 (K. 159a)
- String Quartet No. 8 in F major, K. 168
- String Quartet No. 9 in A major, K. 169
- String Quartet No. 10 in C major, K. 170
- String Quartet No. 11 in E♭ major, K. 171
- String Quartet No. 12 in B♭ major, K. 172
- String Quartet No. 13 in D minor, K. 173
- String Quartet No. 14 in G major, K. 387
- String Quartet No. 15 in D minor, K. 421/417b
- String Quartet No. 16 in E♭ major, K. 428/421b
- String Quartet No. 17 in B♭ major, K. 458
- String Quartet No. 18 in A major, K. 464
- String Quartet No. 19 in C major, K. 465
- String Quartet No. 20 in D major, K. 499
- String Quartet No. 21 in D major, K. 575
- String Quartet No. 22 in B♭ major, K. 589
- String Quartet No. 23 in F major, K. 590
