= Prussian Quartets =

The Prussian Quartets may refer to two sets of quartets dedicated to Frederick William II of Prussia, who was a talented cellist:

- The Prussian Quartets by Joseph Haydn, Op. 50 (composed 1787).
- The Prussian Quartets by Wolfgang Amadeus Mozart (composed 1789–1790), published as his Op. 18 (K. 575, 589, and 590).
