= String Quartet in F major =

String Quartet in F major may refer to:

- No. 5 of the String Quartets, Op. 50 (Haydn)
- String Quartet No. 5 (Mozart)
- String Quartet No. 8 (Mozart)
- String Quartet No. 23 (Mozart)
- String Quartet No. 1 (Beethoven)
- String Quartet No. 7 (Beethoven)
- String Quartet No. 16 (Beethoven)
- String Quartet in F major, Hess 34, an arrangement based on Piano Sonata No. 9
- String Quartet No. 2 (Tchaikovsky)
- Quartet Movement in F major, B.120 (Dvořák)
- String Quartet No. 12 (Dvořák)
- String Quartet (Blumenfeld)
- String Quartet No. 4 (Nielsen)
- String Quartet (Ravel)
- String Quartet No. 2 (Prokofiev)
- String Quartet No. 3 (Shostakovich)
