= String Quartet in B-flat major =

String Quartet in B-flat major may refer to:

- No. 4 of the String Quartets, Op. 33 (Haydn)
- No. 1 of the String Quartets, Op. 50 (Haydn)
- No. 3 of the String Quartets, Op. 64 (Haydn)
- No. 4 of the String Quartets, Op. 76 (Haydn)
- String Quartet No. 6 (Mozart)
- String Quartet No. 12 (Mozart)
- String Quartet No. 17 (Mozart)
- String Quartet No. 22 (Mozart)
- String Quartet No. 6 (Beethoven)
- String Quartet No. 13 (Beethoven)
- String Quartet No. 3 (Schubert)
- String Quartet No. 5 (Schubert)
- String Quartet No. 8 (Schubert)
- String Quartet No. 3 (Brahms)
- Quartet Movement in B-flat major (Tchaikovsky)
- String Quartet No. 2 (Dvořák)
- String Quartet in B-flat major (Sibelius)
- String Quartet No. 1 (Hill)
- String Quartet No. 5 (Shostakovich)
