= String Quartet No. 19 (Mozart) =

1785 composition by W. A. Mozart, the "Dissonance Quartet"

- Dissonance
- by W. A. Mozart
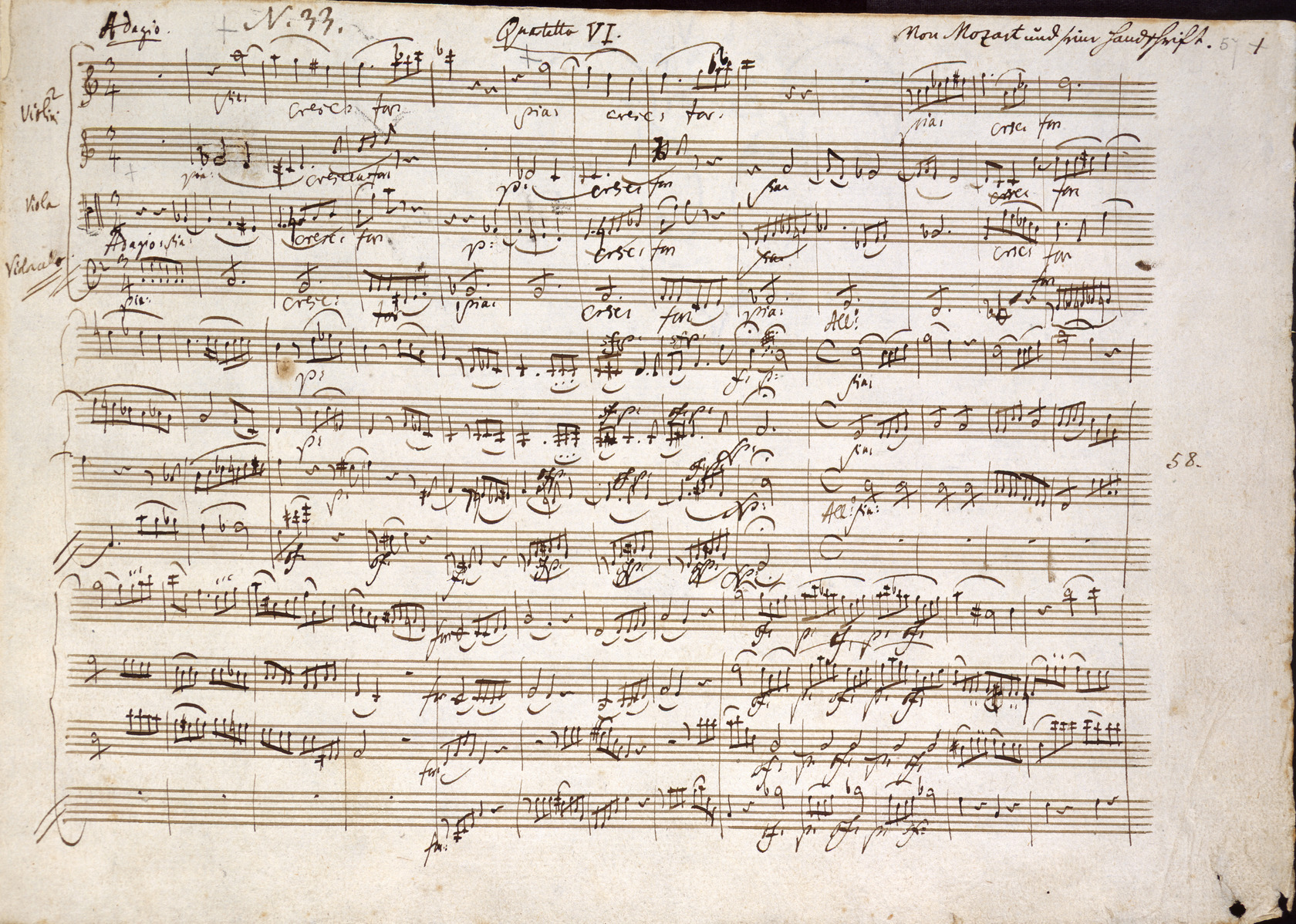
- First page of the autograph manuscript
- Key: C major
- Catalogue: K. 465
- Composed: 14 January 1785, Vienna
- Dedication: Joseph Haydn
- Published: Vienna, after 17 September 1785
- Publisher: Artaria
- Movements: 4
- Scoring: 2 violins, viola, cello

Premiere
- Date: 12 February 1785
- Location: Mozart's home, Vienna
- Performers: Wolfgang Amadeus Mozart, Leopold Mozart, Anton Tinti, Bartholomäus Tinti

The String Quartet No. 19 in C major, K. 465, is a chamber music composition by Wolfgang Amadeus Mozart, subtitled "Dissonance" on account of the unusual counterpoint in its slow introduction.

== History ==
It is the last in the set of six quartets composed between 1782 and 1785 that he dedicated to Joseph Haydn. According to the catalogue of works Mozart began early the preceding year, it was completed on 14 January 1785.

On 12 February, Mozart and his father performed the string quartet along with two others (K. 458, 464) for Haydn. Anton and Bartholomäus Tinti most likely played the other parts in the ensemble.

No patron commissioned these quartets, which makes them an unusually personal effort by the composer. In his dedication, he refers to the quartets as his "children" that he is sending "out into the great world". Mozart continues, "They are, it is true, the fruit of a long and laborious endeavour..." In these quartets he deviated from his usual practice of short scoring Hauptstimmen (main voices) and filling in the rest later. Striving to combine Haydn's quartet language and Bach's counterpoint, he composed all four voices at once.

Artaria & Company announced the publication of all six quartets on 17 September 1785 in the Wiener Zeitung. According to Leopold Mozart, the firm paid the composer 100 ducats for the publishing rights.

The piece was commonly referred to as the "Dissonance" quartet by the time Heinrich Schenker discussed it in 1906. It is unclear when and where the nickname originated.

== Form ==
I. Adagio – Allegro

II. Andante cantabile

III. Menuetto and Trio. Allegro

IV. Allegro molto
Performed by the Musopen String Quartet

The work is composed of four movements:

1. Adagio – Allegro
2. Andante cantabile (F major)
3. Menuetto and Trio. Allegro (Trio in C minor)
4. Allegro molto

=== I. Adagio – Allegro ===
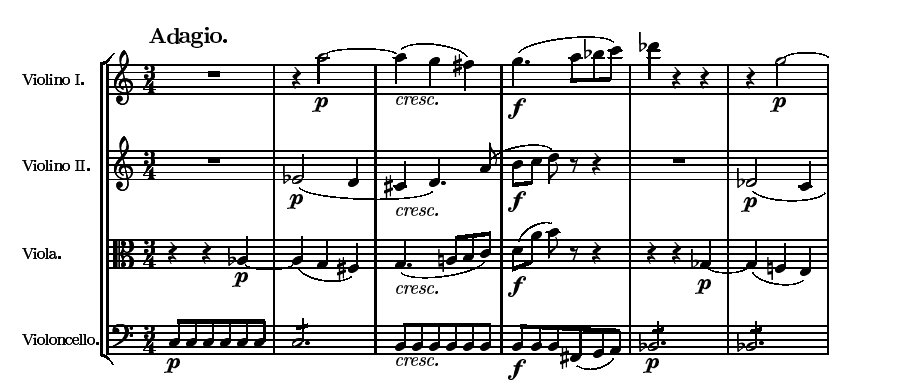
Start of first movement

The 22-bar Adagio opens with quiet eighth note Cs in the cello. It is joined by the viola on A♭ and the second violin on E♭. The first violin enters on A, creating the initial "dissonance" that flummoxed so many listeners. The tension between the A♭ and A is a structural feature of the entire quartet. The Adagio acts as a thesis statement for the composition, introducing the major ideas Mozart will revisit throughout the piece.

While playing with the quality of the sixth scale degree, Mozart assiduously avoids the third to keep the tonality ambiguous. The quartal melodies give rise to whole tone sonorities. The E is only used as a neighboring tone until the first violin plays it on the downbeat of measure 14, but the part immediately descends to an E♭ on the next beat.

The entire Adagio is an elaborate preparation of the dominant chord which Mozart emphasizes with a fermata in its final measure. When the Allegro begins, the cello is silent, and the viola has taken up its eighth note Cs, playing them an octave higher and much more ebulliently than the opening bars.

The main theme of the Allegro is constructed on a 2-bar motive beginning on the tonic C. Mozart sequences the motive up to D in the next two bars, but instead of continuing up to E in the third statement, he leaps to G. He withholds the expected E in the sequence until bar 167 well into the recapitulation of the movement. In the coda, there is a series of 21 consecutive dissonances in just 3 measures.

=== II. Andante cantabile ===
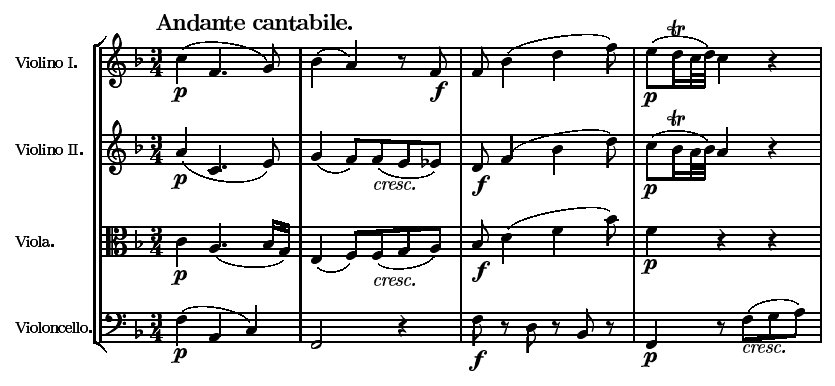
Start of second movement

The second movement is a 3/4 sonatina in F major. The violin's "dissonant" A natural from the quartet's opening now has pride of place as the mediant scale degree. In bars 93–101, the A♭ returns to prominence as Mozart slips into the parallel minor.

The movement has been called the "heart" of the entire piece. Alfred Einstein writes of the coda of this movement that "the first violin openly expresses what seemed hidden beneath the conversational play of the subordinate theme".

=== III. Menuetto and Trio. Allegro ===
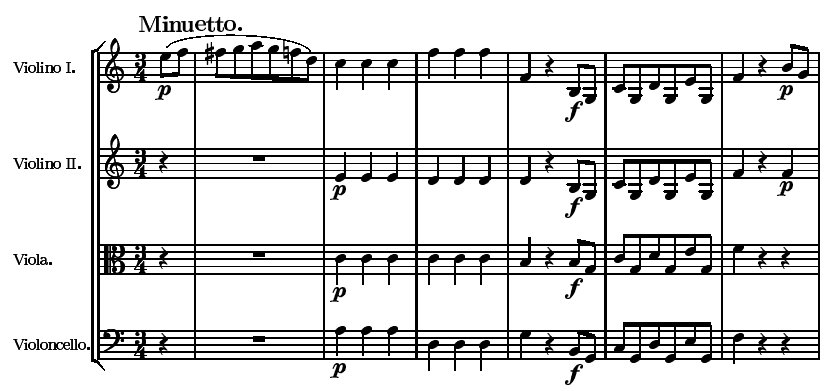
Start of third movement

The third movement is a minuet and trio in C major. The A is often ornamented with an appoggiatura G♯, continuing Mozart's interplay between these two notes. In the trio, the tonality shifts to C minor, returning the A♭ to the fore. The cello's concluding melody in the trio highlights the vacillations between these notes. The texture is mercurial with unison passages often signaling a shift.

=== IV. Allegro molto ===
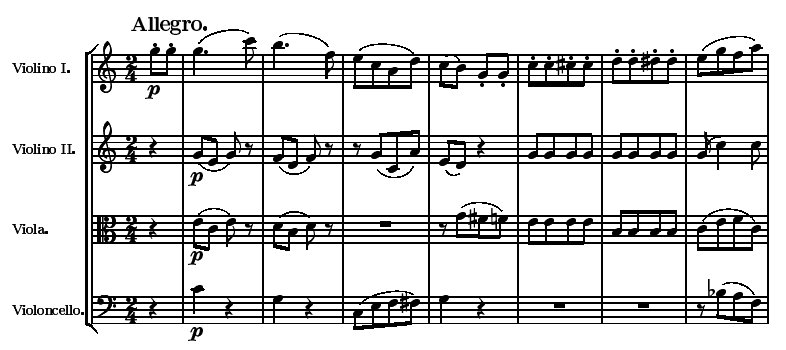
Start of fourth movement

The final movement is a lively contredanse in sonata form. The exposition lasts 136 bars, the development 62, and Mozart includes a 48-bar coda.

There is a great deal of rhythmic variety in the movement. Mozart evokes Haydn's witty deployment of rests, which creates textural variety and contrasts the melodic material. The development is as harmonically audacious as the piece's introduction as it modulates through a circle of fifths in minor keys before returning to the main theme.

== Reception ==
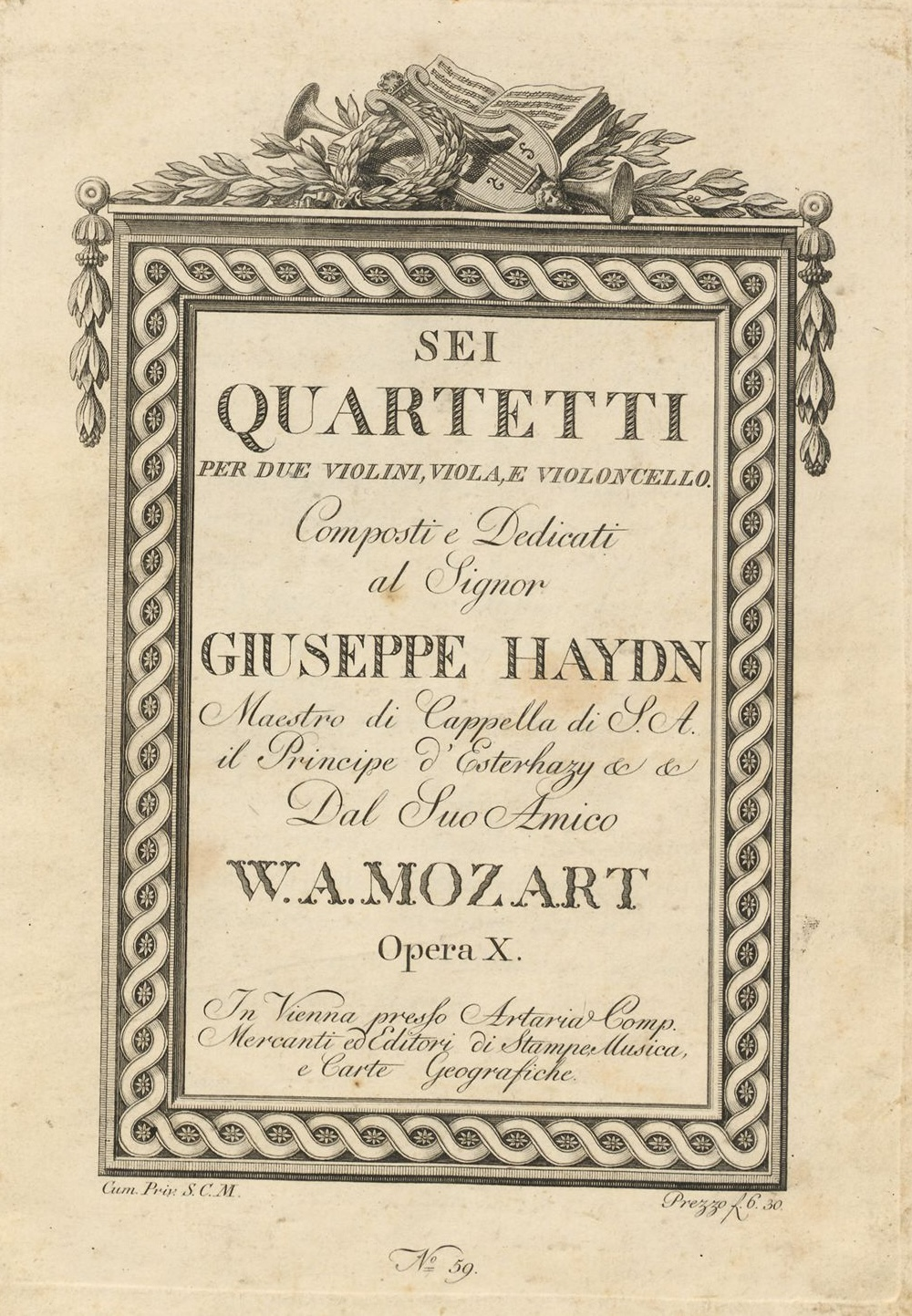
Cover page from Artaria's publication of Mozart's Six String Quartets

The string quartet is one of Mozart's most analyzed compositions and has a long history of musicological debate that began almost immediately upon its publication. The first negative written comment about it was published in Magazin der Musik on 23 April 1787. The correspondent's letter was written on 29 January from Vienna, and reported on Haydn's visit to the city as well as Mozart's plans to travel to Prague and Berlin. The writer lamented the waste of Mozart's prodigious keyboard talent on composition and quipped, "...his new Quartets for 2 violins, viola and bass, which he has dedicated to Haydn, may well be called too highly seasoned-and whose palate can endure this for long?" Two years later, in the same periodical (now published in Copenhagen), Mozart's complexity was praised, "...his six quartets for violins, viola and bass dedicated to Haydn confirm it once again that he has a decided leaning towards the difficult and the unusual. But then, what great and elevated ideas he has too, testifying to a bold spirit!" By 1799, an anecdote from Constanze Mozart was being repeated in the pages of Allgemeine musikalische Zeitung (AmZ) that the Italian printer sent the engravings back to Artaria because he assumed the notes were errors.

The first analytical insult to the piece was penned by Giuseppe Sarti who met Mozart in Vienna in 1784. Mozart felt he was a "good honest fellow" and wrote a set of variations (K. 460) on one of Sarti's arias. In his analysis of the quartet, Sarti called the violin's opening dissonance "execrable" and accused the composer of having "ears lined with iron". Sarti also analyzed K. 421 with his poison pen and concluded, "From these two examples it may be perceived that the author (whom I neither know nor wish to know) is nothing more than a piano-forte player with spoiled ears (!). who does not concern himself about counterpoint; he is a follower of the system of the octave divided into twelve equal semitones, a system long since declared by intelligent artists, and experimentally proved by the science of harmony, to be false." The essay was seen as so gratuitous and vindictive that it was effectively embargoed by Bonifazio Asioli until his death in 1832 when it was finally published in AmZ. The actual date Sarti wrote it is unclear.

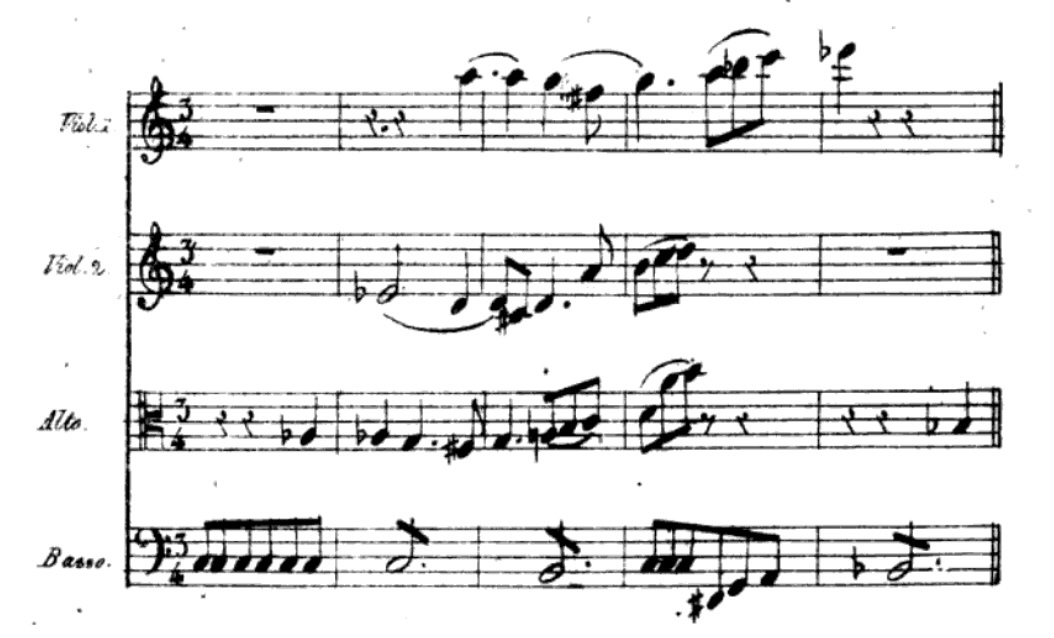
Fétis' 2nd revision to Mozart's introduction

François-Joseph Fétis analyzed the quartet's introduction in his Revue musicale on 17 July 1830. Fétis was so certain that the dissonances were the results of printing errors that he tracked down Mozart's manuscript when he was visiting London, where it was in the possession of J. A. Stumpff. Fétis felt he could solve the problems created by Mozart by delaying the first violin's entrance by one beat. Not satisfied with this first revision, he altered it again by prolonging the 2nd violin's D into the 3rd bar. Both revisions clumsily rewrite Mozart based on rules of imitation Fétis devised in his own theoretical work.

Several other writers tried their hand at analyzing or fixing Mozart's introduction, such as Gottfried Weber, François-Louis Perne, and Raphael-Georg Kiesewetter. Ernest Newman devotes a chapter to the quartet in A Musical Critic's Holiday. The convoluted intellectual history of this passage is similar to the handwringing over Richard Wagner's prelude to Tristan und Isolde. Ironically, Mozart's harmony is a clear functional predecessor to the Tristan chord.
