= List of compositions by Felix Blumenfeld =

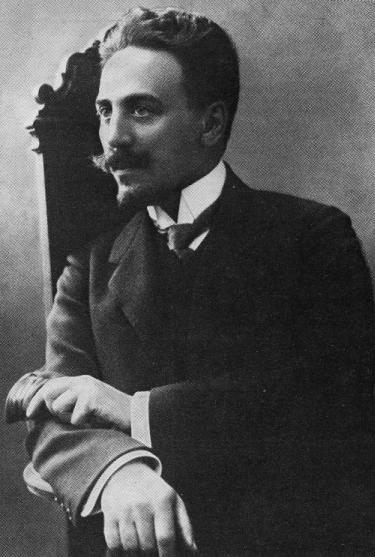
Felix Blumenfeld

This is a list of compositions by Felix Blumenfeld.

== Piano ==
=== Piano solo ===
- Etude, Op. 2/1
- Souvenir douloureux, Op. 2/2
- Quasi Mazurka, Op. 2/3
- Mazurka de concert, Op. 2/4
- Three Etudes, Op. 3
- Valse-etude, Op. 4
- Two Nocturnes, Op. 6
- Variations caractéristiques sur un thème original, Op. 8
- Mazurka, Op. 10
- Mazurka, Op. 11
- Four Preludes, Op. 12
- Two Impromptus, Op. 13
- Etude ‘Sur Mer’ in G minor, Op. 14
- Valse-Impromptu, Op. 16
- 24 Preludes, Op. 17
- Nocturne-Fantasie, Op. 20
- Moment de desespoir, Op. 21/1
- Le Soir, Op. 21/2
- Une course, Op. 21/3
- Mazurka, Op. 22/1
- Valse brillante, Op. 22/2
- Krakowienne, Op. 23/1
- À la Mazurka, Op. 23/2
- Berceuse, Op. 23/3
- Mazurka, Op. 23/4
- Etude de concert in F♯ minor, Op. 24
- Two Etude-Fantaisies, Op. 25 (No. 1 in G minor; No. 2 in E♭ minor)
- Moment Lyrique, Op. 27
- Impromptu, Op. 28
- Two Etudes, Op. 29
- Krakowiak, Op. 31/1
- Kujawiak, Op. 31/2
- Mazurka, Op. 31/3
- Polonaise, Op. 31/4
- Suite lyrique, Op. 32
- Deux fragments caractéristiques, Op. 33
- Ballade en forme de variations, Op. 34
- Three Mazurkas, Op. 35
- Etude for the left hand in A♭ major, Op. 36

Etude for the Left Hand Alone Op 36

- Elegie, Op. 37/1
- Pathetico, Op. 37/2
- Morceaux, Op. 38/1
- L'île abandonnée, Op. 38/2
- By the Sea, Op. 38/3
- Barcarolle, Op. 38/4
- Saules pleureurs, Op. 38/5
- La Fontaine, Op. 38/6
- Cloches, Op. 40
- Zwei Klavierstücke, Op. 43
- Four Etudes, Op. 44
- Two Impromptus, Op. 45
- Sonata-Fantasie, Op. 46
- Deux fragments lyriques, Op. 47
- Etude-Fantaisie in F minor, Op. 48
- Deux moments dramatiques, Op. 50
- Three Nocturnes, Op. 51
- Episodes dans la vie d'une danseuse, Op. 52
- Zwei Klavierstücke, Op. 53
- Etude, Op. 54

== Chamber music ==
=== Cello and piano ===
- Elegie for Cello and Piano, Op. 19/1
- Capriccioso for Cello and Piano, Op. 19/2

=== String quartet ===
- String Quartet in F major, Op. 26

== Orchestra ==
=== Symphonies ===
- Symphony in C minor ‘To the Dear Beloved’, Op. 39

=== Piano and orchestra ===
- Allegro de concert for Piano and Orchestra in A major, Op. 7

=== Other orchestral works ===
- Mazurka, Op. 10 (arrangement by the composer of the piano work, or vice versa)

== Choral music ==
- Sechs Chormelodien, Op. 1
- Fünf Chormelodien, Op. 5
- Fünf Romanzen, Op. 18
- Sechs Romanzen, Op. 30

== Vocal music ==
- 6 Mélodies pour Chant et Piano, Op. 9
- 6 Mélodies pour Chant et Piano, Op.15
