= String Quartet No. 16 =

String Quartet No. 16 may refer to:

- String Quartet No. 16 (Beethoven) by Ludwig van Beethoven
- String Quartet No. 16 (Hill) by Alfred Hill
- String Quartet No. 16 (Milhaud), Op. 303, by Darius Milhaud
- String Quartet No. 16 (Mozart) by Wolfgang Amadeus Mozart
- String Quartet No. 16 (Spohr) by Louis Spohr
- String Quartet No. 16 (Villa-Lobos) by Heitor Villa-Lobos
