= String Duo No. 1 (Mozart) =

String duo by Mozart

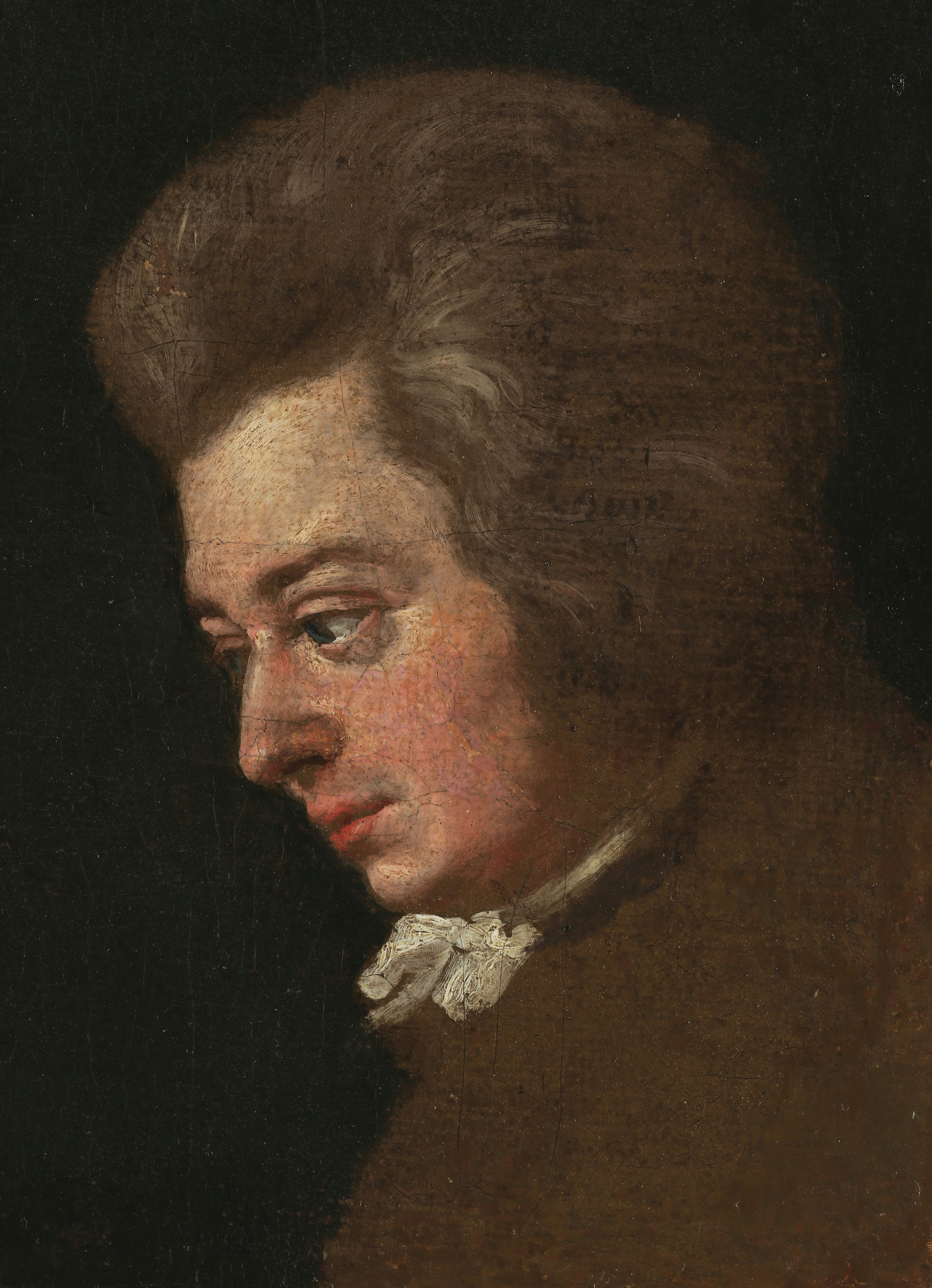
Detail of Lange's 1782–83 Mozart portrait

Wolfgang Amadeus Mozart's String Duo No. 1 in G major for violin and viola, K. 423, was written some time between July and October, 1783. It was the first of two duos that Mozart wrote to complete Michael Haydn's set of six for the Archbishop Colloredo. Mozart wrote them as a favour to Michael Haydn, who fell ill before he could complete all six duos. Mozart composed these two duos in the course of just a few days, passing them off as the work of Haydn (although the true authorship was revealed in subsequent newspaper advertisements placed by the Viennese music dealer Johann Traeg). The set of six duos was presented to the archbishop as having all been composed by Haydn, and Colloredo was unable to "detect in them Mozart's obvious workmanship".

== Description ==
The work is in three movements:

1. Allegro,
2. Adagio, C major, 3/4
3. Rondeau: Allegro,

Whilst the duos by both Mozart and Haydn give the viola many double stops, Mozart's duos differ in that the viola also gets many passages in semiquavers (sixteenth notes), almost in equal proportion to the violin. The American musicologist H. C. Robbins Landon noted of the duo that Mozart used the knowledge he gained in writing his String Quartet in G major, K. 387, the finale of which was in turn influenced by Haydn's Symphony No. 23.

John Irving praises these duos, writing 'The scoring is breathtaking in its inventiveness, exploiting register and colour contrasts to full effect. There is not an idea in either work that does not seem to spring naturally from the instruments themselves.' In the first duo, he singles out 'the extensive development section of K423’s Allegro', and 'the sublimely peaceful Adagio of the same work, in which the transitions between foreground decoration and background harmonic support are effortlessly managed.' Dorian Bandy calls attention to the second subject of the first movement, whose melody seems unassuming enough, 'but look closely and you see that each zigzagging interval is one step larger than the previous one. The theme begins (m. 27) with an ascending second, followed by a descending third, ascending fourth, descending fifth, ascending sixth, and descending seventh.'

== See also ==
The companion piece, the String Duo No. 2 in B-flat major.

== Arrangements ==
By transposing the viola part down an octave, and replacing the viola part's alto clef to the bass clef, the piece is readily playable by a cellist. In 2012, the Austrian composer Gerhard Präsent made an arrangement for string trio (two violins and violoncello), which has been performed several times by the ALEA Ensemble.

== Recordings ==
The duo is almost always paired with the String Duo No. 2, K. 424. They were recorded by Arthur Grumiaux and Arrigo Pelliccia for Philips and appeared in the label's Mozart Edition.

The Hungaroton label has a 2-CD set of the Mozart and Haydn duos with Barnabas Kelemen and Katalin Kokas. The Avie label puts Mozart's duos (played by Phillipe Graffin and Nobuko Imai) on a 2-CD set with other pieces by Mozart, such as the Violin Concerto in G, K. 216, and the Sinfonia Concertante in E-flat major, K. 364. The Odeum Guitar Duo has recorded a transcription of K. 423 for two guitars.

== Sources ==
- Burk, John Naglee (1959). Mozart and His Music. New York: Random House. OCLC 753002715.
- Robbins Landon, Howard Chandler, ed. (1990). The Mozart Compendium: A Guide to Mozart's Life and Music. New York: Schirmer Books. ISBN 0500278849.
