= String Quartet No. 20 (Mozart) =

Mozart's "Hoffmeister" quartet

- Hoffmeister
- by W. A. Mozart
- The opening nine measures of the first movement
- Key: D major
- Catalogue: K. 499
- Composed: 1786, Vienna
- Dedication: Franz Anton Hoffmeister
- Published: After 1786
- Publisher: Franz Anton Hoffmeister
- Movements: 4
- Scoring: 2 violins, viola, cello

The String Quartet No. 20 in D major, K. 499, was written in 1786 in Vienna by Wolfgang Amadeus Mozart. It was published by – if not indeed written for – his friend Franz Anton Hoffmeister. Because of this, the quartet has acquired the nickname Hoffmeister. Hoffmeister had started issuing a series of chamber-music publications in 1785, including Mozart's K. 499 as well as Joseph Haydn's String Quartet No. 35, Op. 42.

== Structure ==
There are four movements:

1. Allegretto, in D major
2. Menuetto: Allegretto, in D major, with a trio section in D minor
3. Adagio, in G major
4. Allegro, in D major

This work, sandwiched between the six Haydn Quartets (1782–85) and the following three Prussian Quartets (1789–90), is often polyphonic in a way uncharacteristic of the earlier part of the classical music era. The menuetto and its trio give good examples of this in brief, with the brief irregular near-canon between first violin and viola in the second half of the main portion of the minuet, and the double imitations in the trio between the violins, and between the viola and cello.

== See also ==
- String Quartet in E-flat major by Johann Baptist Wanhal (1739–1813), string quartet dedicated to Hoffmeister by a contemporary of Mozart.
