= String Quartet in E-flat major (Wanhal) =

Composition by Johann Baptist Wanhall (c. 1785)

The String Quartet in E♭ major was composed by Johann Baptist Wanhal around 1785, like Mozart's D major String Quartet K. 499, the composition was dedicated to Franz Anton Hoffmeister and has become known by the nickname Hoffmeister Nº. 2.

== Structure ==
The composition is in three movements:

1. Allegro con fuoco
2. Adagio
3. Allegro

== See also ==
- String Quartet No. 20 (Mozart)
