= Haydn Quartet =

Haydn Quartet(s) may refer to:

- Haydn Quartet, a string quartet written by Joseph Haydn
- Haydn Quartets (Mozart), written by Wolfgang Amadeus Mozart and dedicated to Haydn
- Haydn Quartet (vocal ensemble), an American close-harmony vocal group
