= Louise Béguin-Salomon =

French pianist, composer and teacher (1831–1916)

- Born: Louise-Frédérique Cohen; 9 April 1831; Marseille, France
- Died: 12 November 1916 (aged 85); 17th arrondissement of Paris, France
- Occupations: Pianist; composer; teacher

Louise Béguin-Salomon (9 April 1831 – 12 November 1916) was a French pianist, composer and teacher of the late Romantic period. A student of Louise Farrenc at the Conservatoire de Paris, Béguin-Salomon became a celebrated pianist in the Parisian concert scene, often programming canonic standards alongside contemporary repertoire. As a composer she authored a wide variety of solo piano works.

== Life and career ==
Louise-Frédérique Cohen (née Salomon) was born on 9 April 1831 in Marseille, France. She was the daughter of Salomon Rousseau Cohen (1796–1876) and Cesarine Boisset (1796–1880); at some point the family lived in Remilly-Aillicourt. Admitted to the Conservatoire de Paris on 7 July 1843, she studied there until 1851. Her instruction there initially included keyboard with Mlle Jousselin, and later with the composer-pianist Louise Farrenc. According to François-Joseph Fétis in his Biographie universelle des musiciens, she was among Farrenc's best students. At the Conservatoire she received a series of prizes: 1st prize in music theory (1846); 2nd prize in piano (1847); 2nd prize in harmony (1850); 1st prize in harmony and accompaniment (1851). She married Charles Alexandre Beguin in Paris on 26 July 1855.

Béguin-Salomon was active as a pianist, teacher and composer. She was a celebrated performer, programming canonnic standards alongside repertoire by living composers. Fétis noted that numerous young composers "owed to her their first successes", he further described her as "one of the best pianists in Paris, one of the artists most beloved by the public." Throughout the 1860s and 70s she frequently performed with the violinist José White Lafitte. Béguin-Salomon received the Officier d'Academie honor in 1887 and died on 12 November 1916 in the 17th arrondissement of Paris, France.

Throughout Béguin-Salomon's lifetime she composed numerous pieces for piano, described by Fétis as often with "amiable and delicate feeling". Her œuvre included La Bal breton: Quadrille brillant et facile (1849), Mazurka de Salon (1875), and Petite suite des pièces faciles dans le style classique (1894). In addition, Béguin-Salomon arranged the Andante movement of Wolfgang Amadeus Mozart's String Quartet No. 1 for piano in 1853.

== List of compositions ==
=== Piano Solo ===
- La Bal breton, quadrille brillant et facile (1849)
- Le Mysoli, bluette pour piano, Op. 11 (1853)
- Morceau de salon pour piano, Op. 12 (1854)
- Étude de concert pour la main gauche pour piano, Op. 14 (1859)
- Caprice étude en la (1860)
- Marine, Op. 22 (1874)
- Mazurka de salon (1875)
- Élégie (1889)
- Tarentelle (1893)
- Petite suite de pièces faciles dans le style classique (1894)

=== Piano 4 Hands ===
- Berceuses (1893)
