= String Quartet No. 2 (Mozart) =

1772 composition by W. A. Mozart

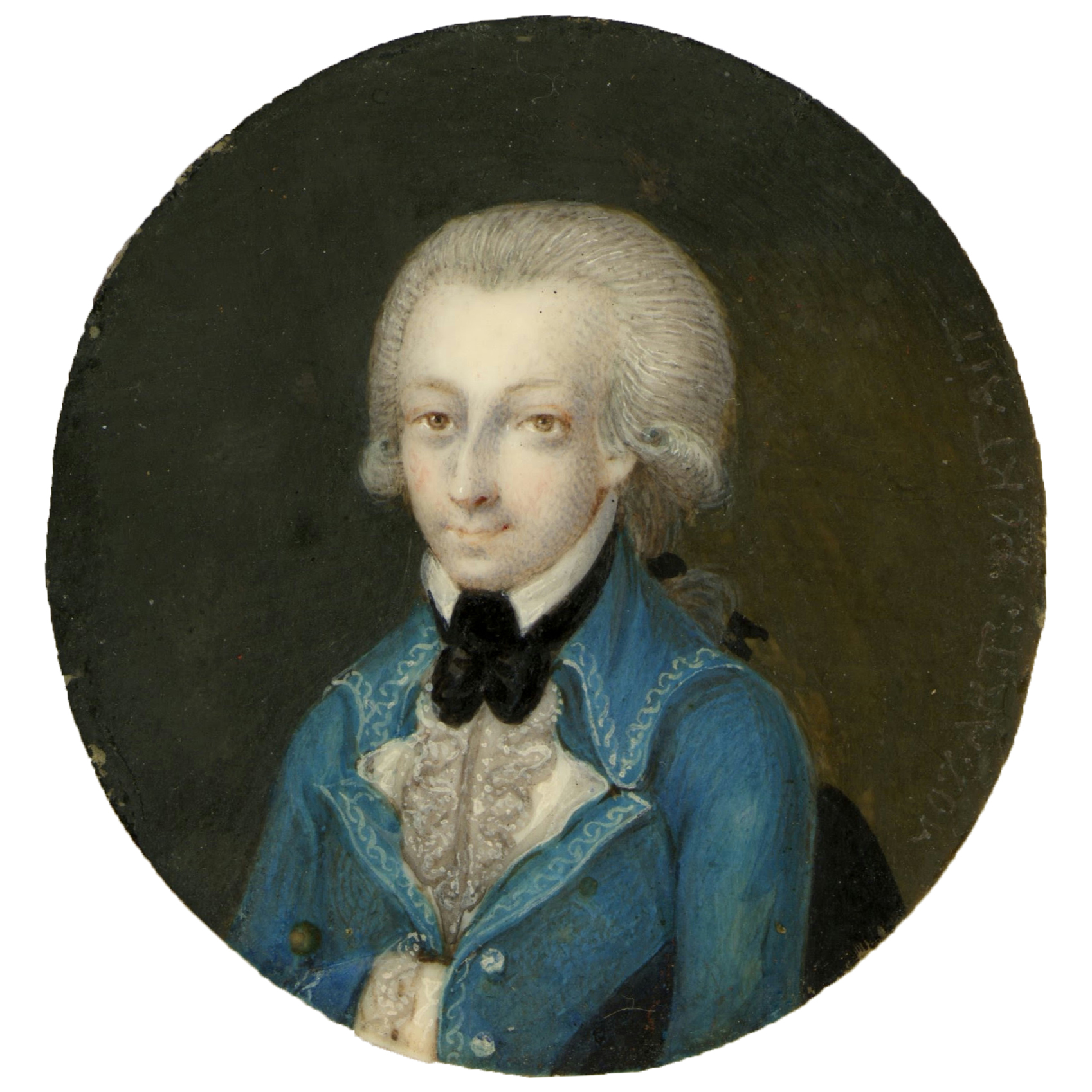
1773 miniature of Mozart

Wolfgang Amadeus Mozart's String Quartet No. 2 in D major, K. 155/134a, is thought to have been composed in the autumn of 1772 in Bolzano, while Mozart and his father were touring Italy. The opening movement is notable for its unusual (at the time) key changes and its use of the interrupted cadence. The piece is part of Mozart's six Milanese quartets.

== Movements ==
The quartet has three movements:

1. Allegro
2. Andante in A major
3. Molto allegro
