= String Quartet No. 1 (Mozart) =

1770 composition by W. A. Mozart

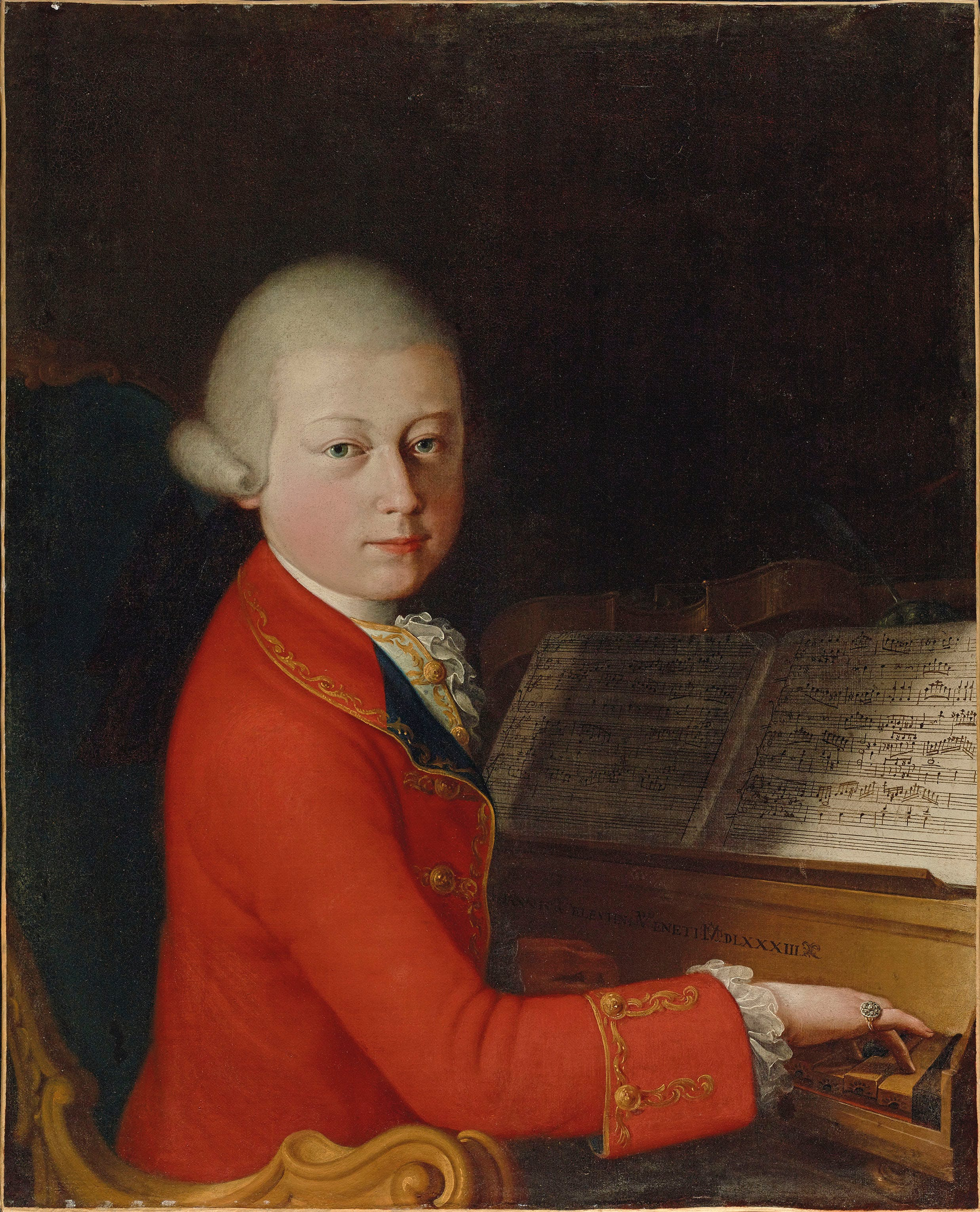
1770 Verona portrait of Mozart

Wolfgang Amadeus Mozart's String Quartet No. 1 in G major, K. 80/73f, was completed in its original three-movement form on 15 March 1770 while touring in Lodi, Lombardy. Mozart was 14 at the time. The fourth movement was added later, possibly in 1773, when Mozart and his father visited Vienna. There is a theory surrounding who this piece is in the style of, and many say the Italian cellist and composer Luigi Boccherini was the primary influence for this string quartet.

French composer Louise Béguin-Salomon arranged the Andante movement of Mozart's String Quartet No. 1 for piano in 1853.

== Movements ==
In contrast to the Milanese Quartets, this quartet is in four-movement form:

1. Adagio, 3/4
2. Allegro,
3. Minuetto, trio in C major, 3/4
4. Rondeau – Allegro,
