= Prussian Quartets (Mozart) =

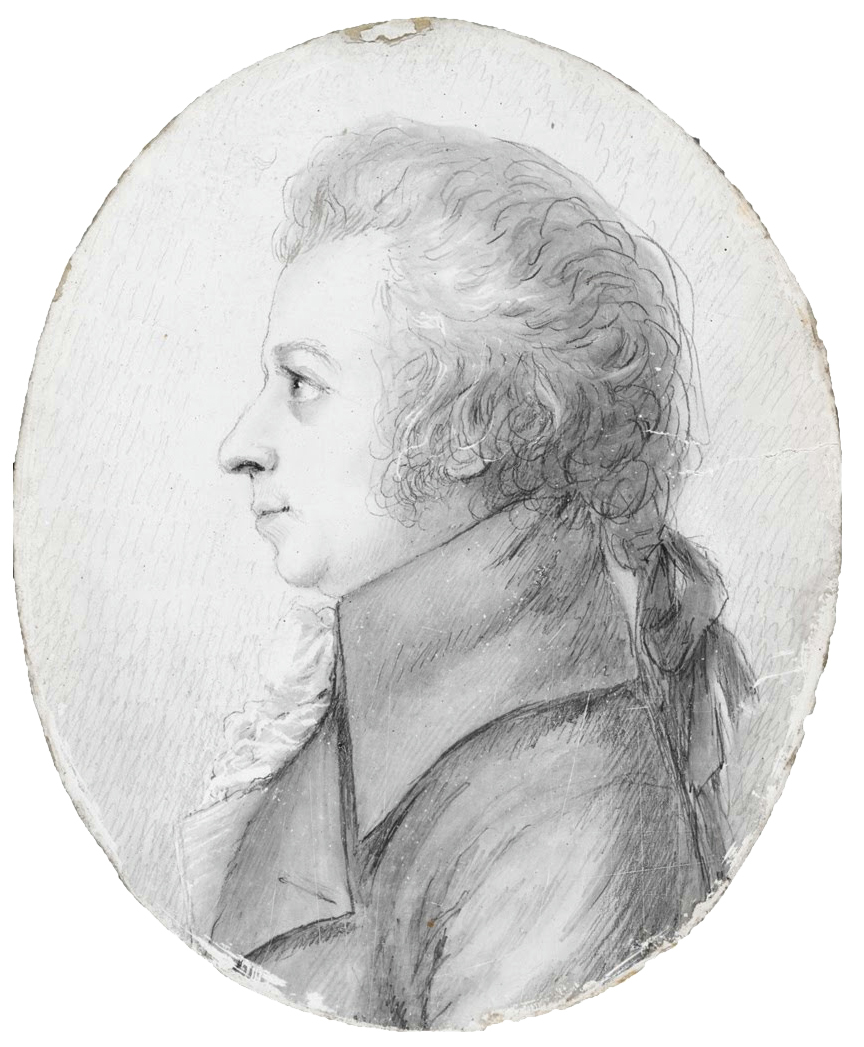
Stock's 1789 miniature of Mozart

The Prussian Quartets are a set of three string quartets, nos. 21–23 (K. 575, 589, 590), nicknamed 'Prussian', composed by Wolfgang Amadeus Mozart between 1789 and 1790 and dedicated to the King of Prussia, Friedrich Wilhelm II. They were posthumously published in December 1791 by Artaria as Op. 18, only a few weeks after Mozart's death. Although not considered on a par with the earlier, more famous Haydn Quartets (K. 387, 421, 428, 458, 464, 465), these pieces are noted for their beauty, equilibrium amongst the instruments and the exceptional prominence and cantabile nature of the cello part (the instrument played by the king himself). These are also the only pieces in this genre that Mozart composed 'to order', i.e. as a commission from a royal patron.

== The Quartets ==
- String Quartet No. 21 in D major, K. 575, Op. 18, No. 1 (1789)
- String Quartet No. 22 in B♭ major, K. 589, Op. 18, No. 2 (1790)
- String Quartet No. 23 in F major, K. 590, Op. 18, No. 3 (1790)

Due to the prominence of the cello part these quartets came to be known as 'Concertante Quartets'.

== Historical background ==
While Mozart was composing these quartets he was also working on a set of sonatas for the King's daughter, Princess Friederike (K. 576 was the only one completed). He was paid 100 Friedrichs d’or for his work. But thereafter Mozart received no more of his promised fees. In effect Mozart withheld the dedication and engraved the piece at his own expense as he wrote in a letter to his friend and fellow freemason Michael von Puchberg: "... I am meanwhile composing...six quartets for the King, all of which Kozeluch is going to engrave at my expense."

Mozart never dedicated the pieces to the Prussian King, so the title of these quartets has originated from his private thematic catalogue of his own work (which he was keeping at the time). He entered K. 575 as "A quartet for 2 violins, viola, and cello, for his Majesty the King of Prussia". He did not mention the King of Prussia in his entries for K. 589 and K. 590.

== Critical reception ==
The quartets were enthusiastically received. For instance the Wiener Zeitung announced the publication of the quartets as follows:

From Artaria Comp., art dealers in the Kohlmarkt are to be had: Three entirely new concertante quartets for two violins, viola and violoncello by Hr. Kapellmeister Mozart Op 18. These quartets are one of the estimable works of the composer Mozart, who was torn untimely from this world; they flowed from the pen of this so great musical genius not long before his death, and they display all that musical interest in respect of Art, Beauty, and Taste, which must awaken pleasure and admiration not only in the amateur but the true connoisseur also.
