= Franz Anton Hoffmeister =

Austrian composer

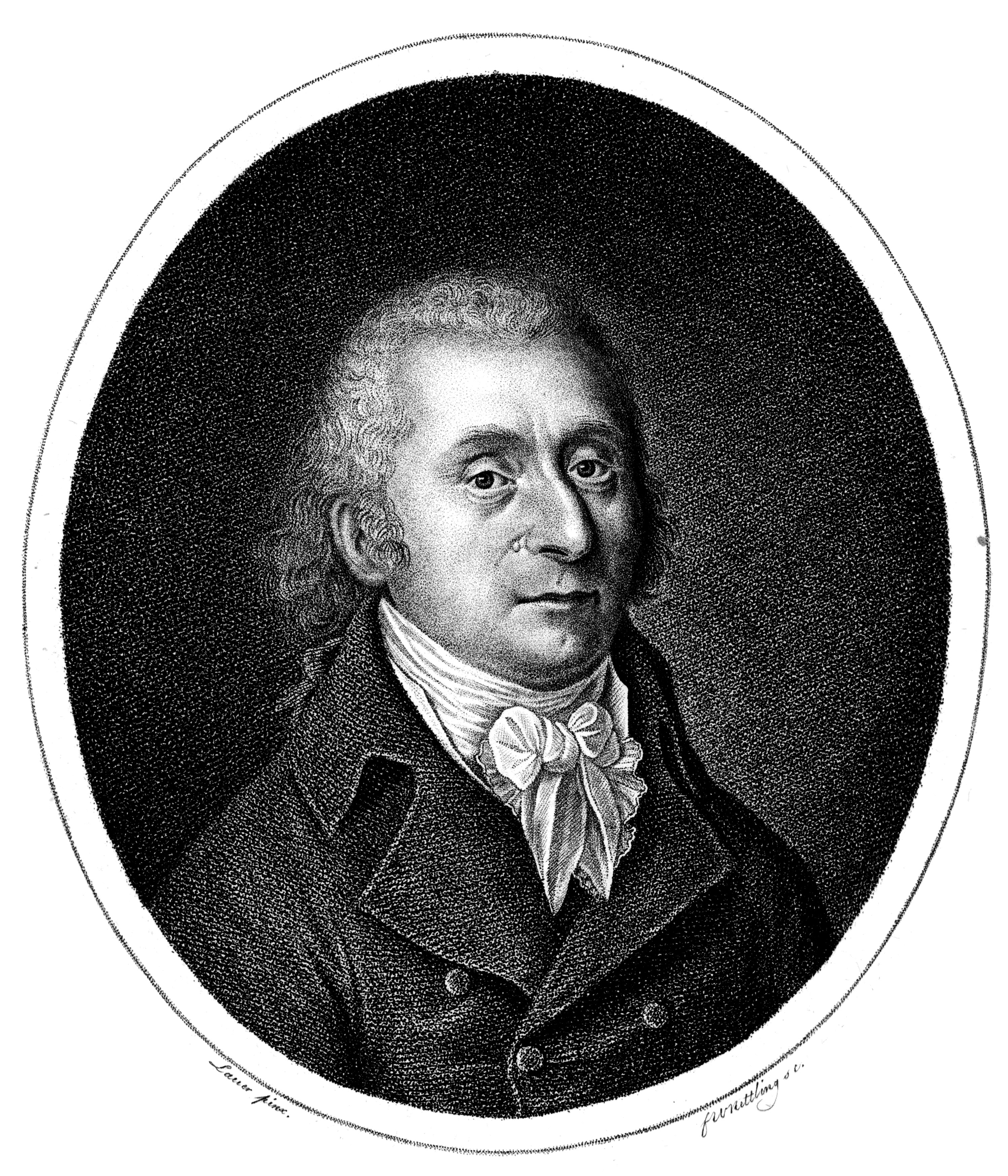
- Born: 12 May 1754; Rottenburg am Neckar, Further Austria, Holy Roman Empire
- Died: 9 February 1812 (aged 57); Vienna, Austrian Empire
- Occupations: Composer, Music Publisher
- Known for: Amongst Vienna's first music publishers

Franz Anton Hoffmeister (12 May 1754 – 9 February 1812) was a German and Austrian composer and music publisher.

== Early years ==
Franz Anton Hoffmeister was born in Rottenburg am Neckar, Further Austria, on 12 May 1754. At the age of fourteen, he went to Vienna to study law. Following his studies, however, he decided on a career in music and by the 1780s he had become one of the city’s most popular composers, with an extensive and varied catalogue of works to his credit.

Hoffmeister’s reputation today rests mainly on his activities as a music publisher. By 1785 he had established one of Vienna’s first music publishing businesses, second only to Artaria & Co, which had ventured into the field five years earlier.

Hoffmeister published his own works as well as those of many important composers of the time, including Haydn, Mozart, Beethoven, Clementi, Johann Georg Albrechtsberger, Carl Ditters von Dittersdorf and Johann Baptist Wanhal. These famous composers were also among Hoffmeister's personal friends: Mozart dedicated his String Quartet in D to him and Beethoven addressed him in a letter as my "most beloved brother".

== Compositions ==
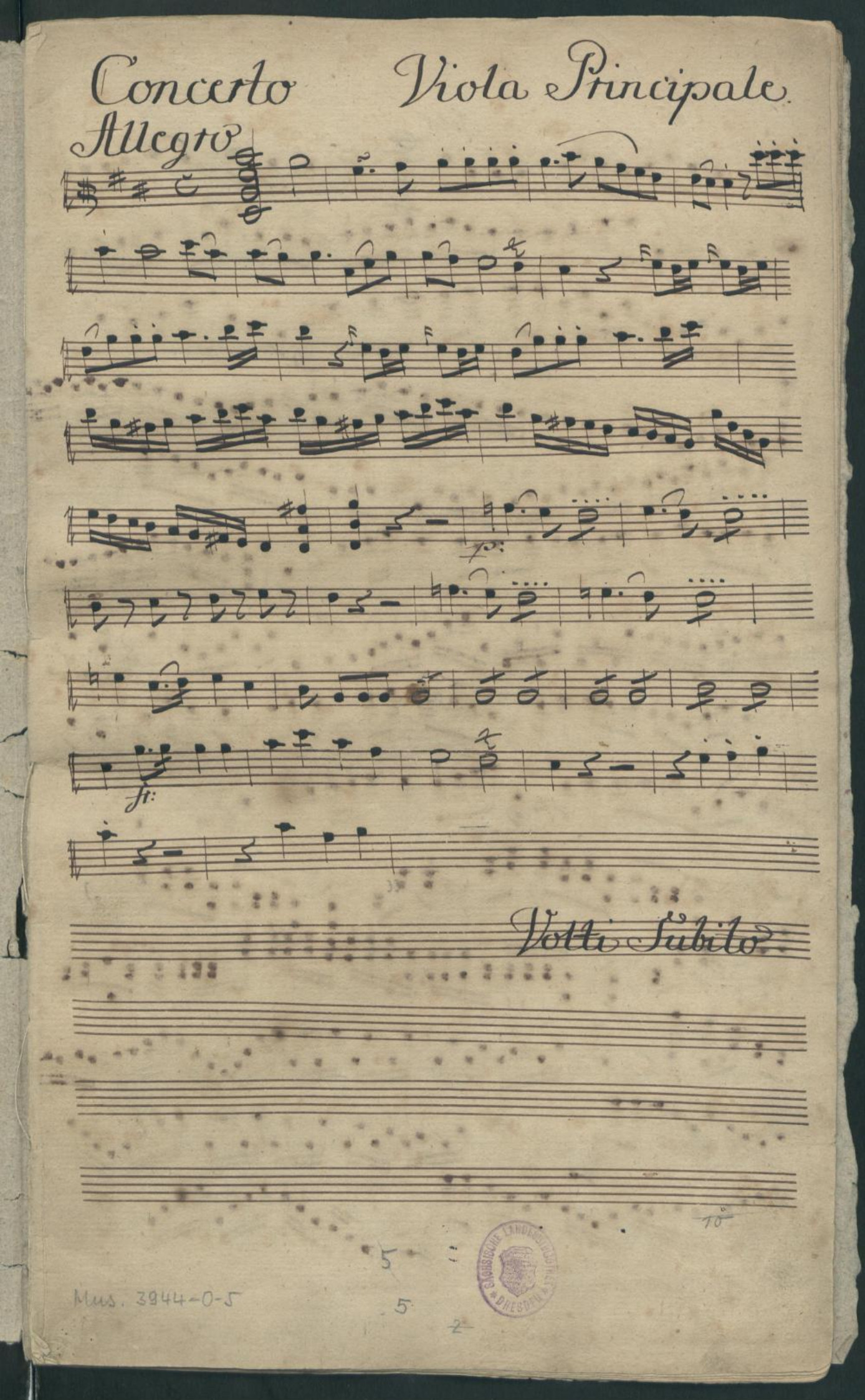
First page of the viola solo part, in the manuscript parts set of Hoffmeister's viola concerto in D

Hoffmeister’s publishing activities reached a peak in 1791, but thereafter he appeared to have devoted more time to composition. Most of his operas were composed and staged during the early 1790s and this, combined with an apparent lack of business sense, led to his noticeable decline as a publisher.

== Publishing interests ==
In 1799, Hoffmeister and the flautist Franz Thurner set off on a concert tour which was to have taken them as far afield as London. They got no further than Leipzig, where Hoffmeister befriended the organist Ambrosius Kühnel. The two men decided to set up a music publishing partnership and "within a year" had founded the 'Bureau de Musique', which was eventually taken over by the well-respected C.F. Peters, a firm that is still active today. Among the publications of the Bureau de Musique was the first edition of Johann Sebastian Bach's Keyboard Works in 14 volumes (1802). The publisher Friedrich Hofmeister (founder of Friedrich Hofmeister Musikverlag) learnt his trade, in part, whilst working as an assistant in the Bureau de Musique. Until 1805, Hoffmeister kept both the Viennese firm and his newer Leipzig publishing house going, but in March 1805 he transferred sole ownership of the Bureau de Musique to Kühnel. His interest in the Viennese firm also waned, for in 1806, apparently to allow time for composition, he sold the 20-year-old business to the Chemische Druckerey.

As a composer, Hoffmeister was highly respected by his contemporaries, as can be seen in the entry, published in the year of his death, in Gerber's Neues Lexikon der Tonkünstler:

If you were to take a glance at his many and varied works, then you would have to admire the diligence and the cleverness of this composer.... He earned for himself a well-deserved and wide-spread reputation through the original content of his works, which are not only rich in emotional expression but also distinguished by the interesting and suitable use of instruments and through good practicability. For this last trait we have to thank his knowledge of instruments, which is so evident that you might think that he was a virtuoso on all of the instruments for which he wrote.

== Works ==
Prominent in Hoffmeister’s extensive oeuvre are works for the flute, including more than 25 concertos as well as chamber works with the flute in a leading role. Many of these works would have been composed with Vienna’s growing number of amateur musicians in mind, for whom the flute was one of the most favoured instruments. Hoffmeister also composed at least eight operas, over 50 symphonies, numerous concertos (including an often-played concerto for the viola), a large amount of string chamber music, piano music and several collections of songs.

== Selected works ==
=== With opus number ===
- Duo for two Flutes Op. 31/3
- Duets for Violin & Violoncello 1-3 Op. 6
- Duets for Violin & Viola 1-3 Op. 7
- String Quartets 1-6 Op. 7?
- String Quartets 1-6 Op. 10
- Duets for Violin & Viola 1-6 Op. 13
- String Quartets 1-3 Op. 14
- Duets for Violin & Viola 1-6 Op. 19
- Quartetti Concertanti 1-3 Op. 29
- String Quintet Op. 62
- Duets for Violin & Viola 1-6 Op. 65

=== Without opus number ===
- 6 Airs for 2 flutes
- Clarinet Concerto in Bb
- Oboe Concerto in C major
- 6 Caprices for Solo Violin
- 12 Etudes for Viola (1803, Leipzig Bureau de Musique)
- 12 Variations for Flute and Strings
- Viola Concerto in D major
- Viola Concerto in B-flat major
- Concerti for Double Bass

== Selected recordings ==
- Mozart, Hoffmeister - Arthur Grumiaux, Arrigo Pelliccia – Duos for violin and viola - Philips
- Franz Anton Hoffmeister, Wilhelm Neuhaus, Hans-Jurgen Mohring, Cologne Chamber Orchestra, Helmut Muller-Bruhl – Piano Concerto In D Major, Op. 24 / Flute Concerto In D Major - Musical Heritage Society
- Hoffmeister | Stamitz | Benda - Maxence Larrieu, Hans Stadlmair, Munich Chamber Orchestra – Les Concertos Hoffmeister, Stamitz, Benda - Barclay
- Theodor von Schacht, Franz Anton Hoffmeister, Dieter Klöcker – Klarinettenkonzert B-Dur / Klarinettenkonzert B-Dur - Acanta
- Sergei Nakariakov - Haydn, Hoffmeister, Mendelssohn – Concertos For Trumpet - Teldec
- Hoffmeister, Lebrun, Fiala Und Koželuh – Albrecht Mayer, Kammerakademie Potsdam – Deutsche Grammophon
- Franz Anton Hoffmeister: 12 Etudes For Viola - Marco Misciagna, viola - MM18
- Franz Anton Hoffmeister: Ouverture dall’opera “Der Königssohn aus Ithaka” (1795); Sinfonia in do maggiore (Hickman C8); Sinfonia in re maggiore (Hickman D8); Orchestra della Svizzera italiana, direttore Howard Griffiths, CPO 2015.

== Literature ==
- Clive, Peter, Mozart and His Circle: A Biographical Dictionary (New Haven: Yale University Press, 1993), pp. 160–161
- Lawford-Hinrichsen, Irene, Music Publishing and Patronage: C. F. Peters: 1800 to the Holocaust (Kenyon: Edition Press, 2000), pp. 3–7
