= String Quartet No. 14 (Mozart) =

1782 composition by W. A. Mozart

- Spring
- by W. A. Mozart
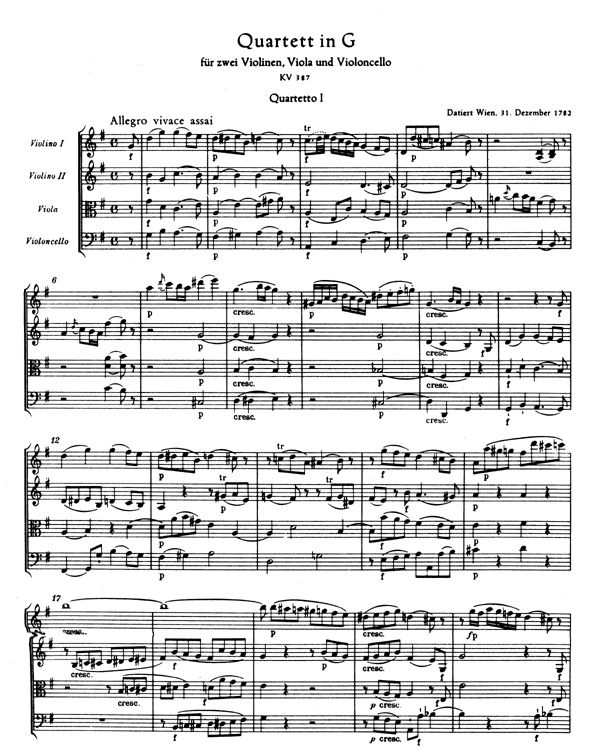
- Opening of the first movement (Bärenreiter)
- Key: G major
- Catalogue: K. 387
- Composed: 31 December 1782
- Dedication: Joseph Haydn
- Performed: 1783
- Movements: 4
- Scoring: 2 violins; viola; cello

The String Quartet No. 14 in G major, K. 387, nicknamed the "Spring" quartet, was composed by Wolfgang Amadeus Mozart in 1782 in Vienna. In the composer's inscription on the title page of the autograph score is stated: li 31 di decembre 1782 in vienna. The work was perhaps edited in 1783. This is the first of the Haydn Quartets, a set of six string quartets he wrote during his first few years in Vienna and dedicated to Joseph Haydn.

== Movements ==
I. Allegro vivace assai (extract)

Average performances of the whole string quartet vary in length from 26 to 33 minutes. As with all later Mozart quartets, this quartet has four movements:

1. Allegro vivace assai
2. Menuetto Allegro (Trio in G minor)
3. Andante cantabile, in C major
4. Molto allegro

The first movement, in G major, contrasts fairly diatonic passages with chromatic runs. According to (Williams, 1997) "it must come as something of a surprise to anyone examining this quartet just how much chromaticism there is in it." In contrast to the standard quartet form, which places the minuet as the third movement, this quartet has the minuet as its second movement (another example of this ordering is the String Quartet No. 17). It is a long minuet, written in the tonic key of G major, with its chromatic fourths set apart by note-to-note dynamics changes. Its trio is in G minor and has a suitably darker and more unsettled mood.

The minuet is followed by a slow movement in the subdominant C major, whose theme explores remote key areas.

The fugal theme of four whole notes in the finale points ahead to the finale of Mozart's "Jupiter" Symphony of 1788, a movement which also begins with four whole notes that are used in a fugal fashion in the coda, and it also points back to Michael Haydn's Symphony No. 23 in which the finale is also a fugato based on a theme of four whole notes, of which Mozart copied out the first few bars and which was mistakenly entered into Köchel's original catalogue as K. 291. Mozart uses an identical 5-note motif in the opening bar of his second duo for violin and viola, K. 424, also associated with Michael Haydn.
