= String Duo No. 2 (Mozart) =

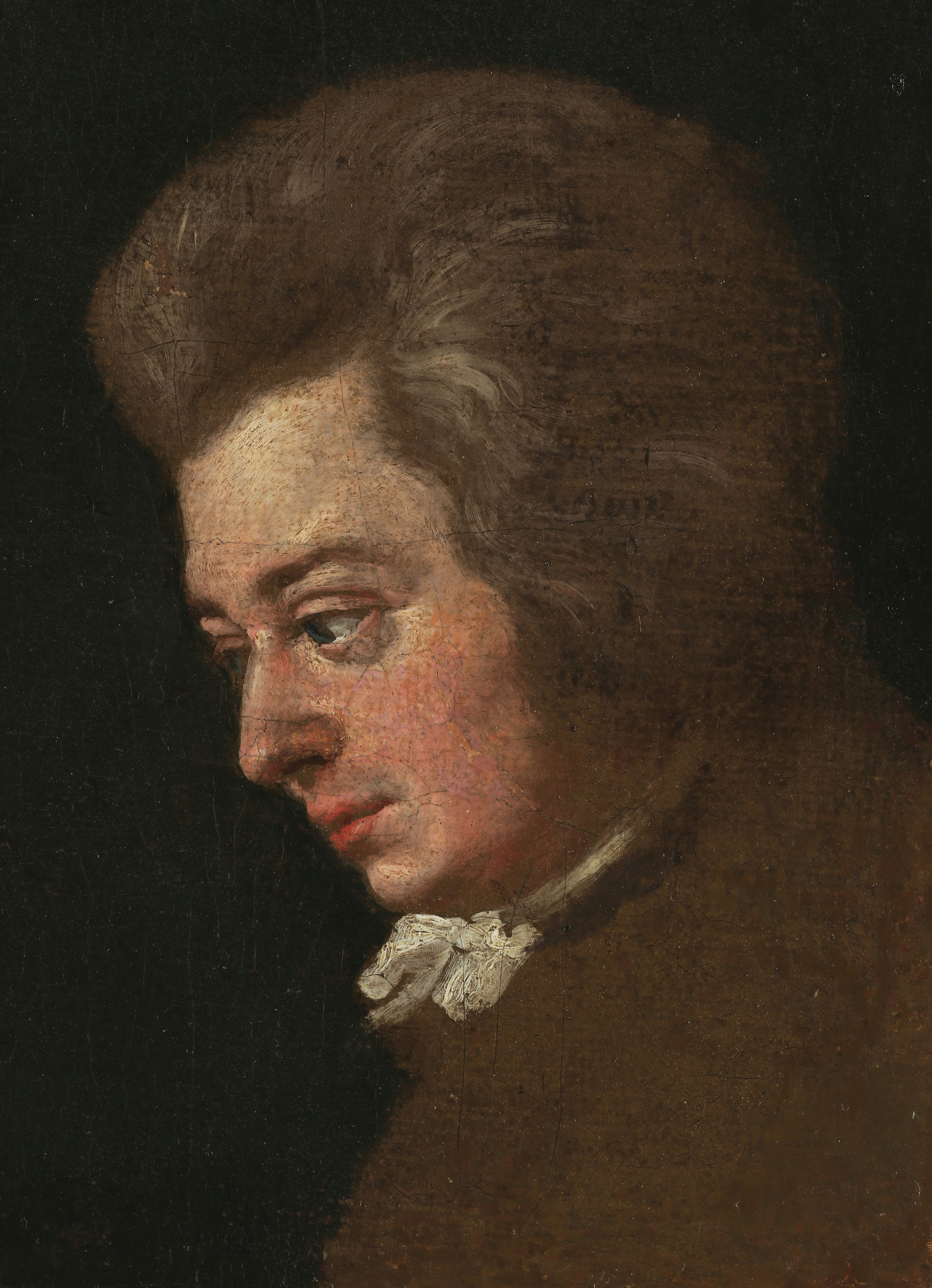
Detail of Lange's 1782–83 Mozart portrait

Wolfgang Amadeus Mozart's String Duo No. 2 in B♭ major for violin and viola, K. 424, the second of the two Mozart wrote to complete Michael Haydn's set of six for the Archbishop Colloredo, was written in the summer of 1783. See String Duo No. 1 (Mozart) for more details of the two works.

It is in three movements:

1. Adagio – Allegro,
2. Andante cantabile, E♭ major, 6/8
3. Andante grazioso,

The last movement is a theme with six variations and a coda. As a whole, this duo blends in better with Haydn's four because the viola is more limited to providing harmony than in K. 423. The set of six was presented as all Haydn's, and Colloredo was unable to "detect in them Mozart's obvious workmanship."

John Irving describes both works as 'breathtaking in inventiveness', singling out in this duo 'the powerful Adagio introduction to K424, resembling at times the ‘French ouverture’ idiom; the tonal digression into the flat mediant in the development section of the ensuing Allegro; and the deft touches of melodic chromaticism that colour its siciliana slow movement.'
