= String Quartet No. 21 (Mozart) =

1789 composition by W. A. Mozart

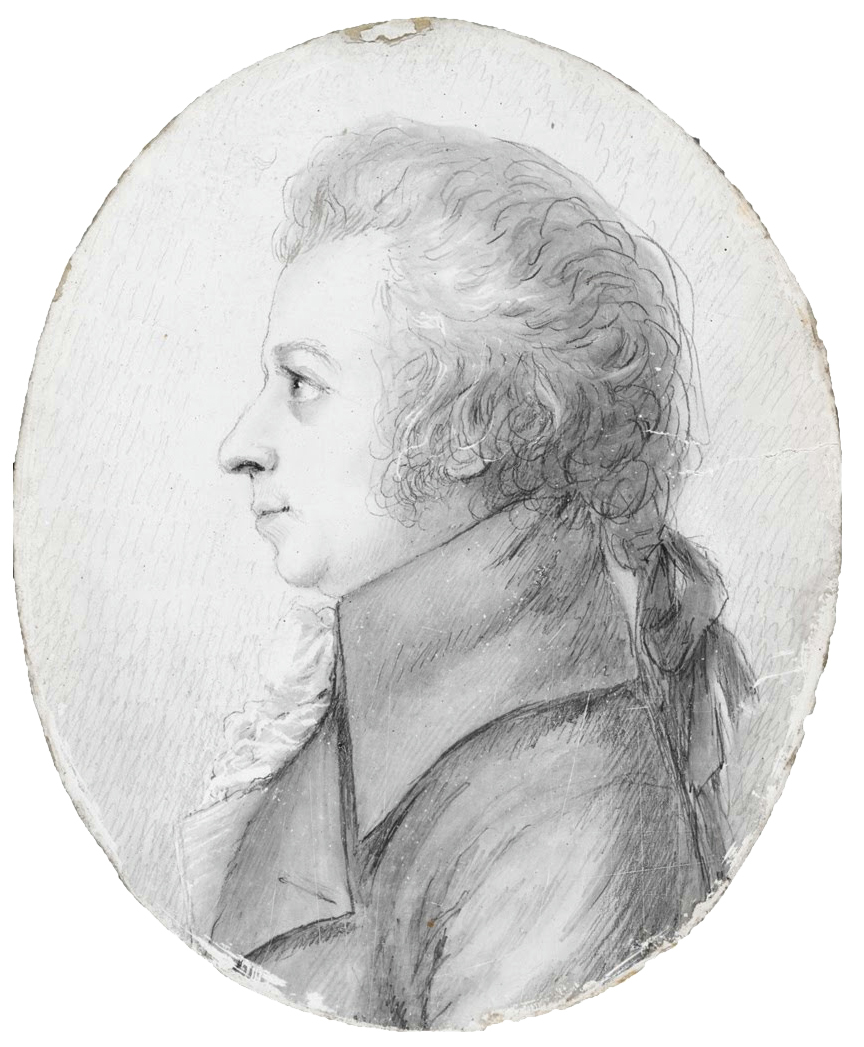
Stock's 1789 miniature of Mozart

The String Quartet No. 21 in D major, K. 575, was written in June 1789 by Wolfgang Amadeus Mozart. It is the first of the Prussian Quartets.

There are four movements:

1. Allegretto
2. Andante, in A major
3. Menuetto: Allegretto, in D major with a trio section in G major
4. Allegretto in D major

The quartet was written for, and in Mozart's personal catalog was described as being dedicated to, the King of Prussia, Friedrich Wilhelm II, an amateur cellist. Of the three Prussian Quartets, K. 575 was the only one Mozart referred to in this way. The quartet was written in a similar style to the quartets of Joseph Haydn. Mozart and his friend Karl Lichnowsky met the king in Potsdam in April 1789. Mozart played before the king in Berlin on 26 May 1789, then returned to Vienna.

A typical performance lasts around 24 minutes.

== Nickname ==
The quartet is occasionally referred to with nickname The Violet, used for example in Hans Keller's chapter of The Mozart Companion. The nickname is based on the resemblance of the opening theme of the second movement to Mozart's lied "Das Veilchen" "The Violet", K. 476, written in 1785.
