= String Quartet No. 18 (Mozart) =

Fifth of Mozart's six string quartets dedicated to Haydn (1785)

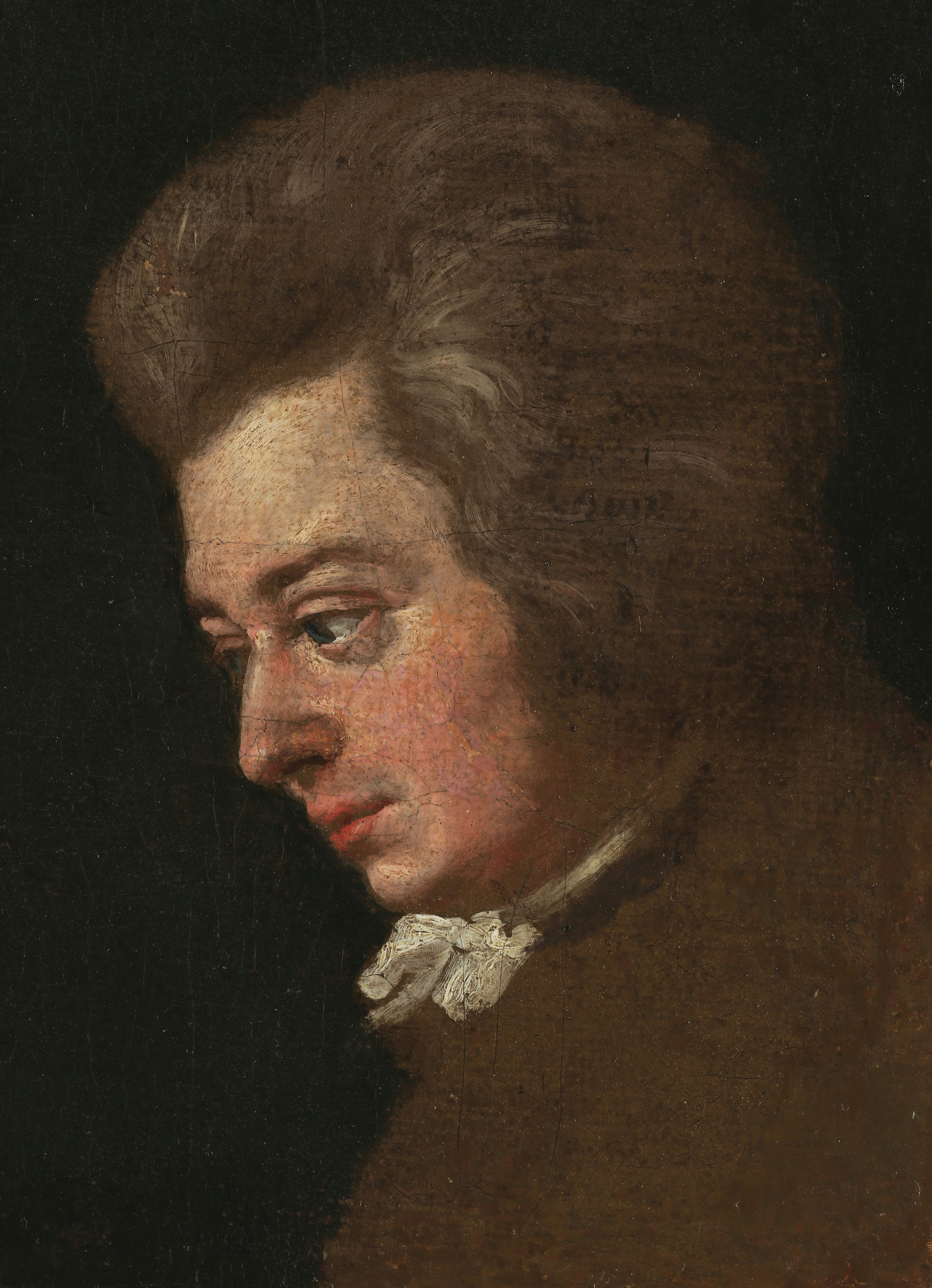
Detail of Lange's 1782–83 Mozart portrait

Wolfgang Amadeus Mozart's String Quartet No. 18 in A major, K. 464, the fifth of the Quartets dedicated to Haydn, was completed in 1785. Mozart's autograph catalogue states as the date of composition "1785. / the 10th January". It is in four movements:

1. Allegro
2. Menuetto and Trio (the latter in E major)
3. Andante (theme with variations), D major
4. Allegro non troppo

The whole piece is characterized by the use of several different contrapuntal devices. In England "this quartet is known as the Drum because the cello part in variation six [of the Andante] maintains a staccato drum-like motion."

In his biography of Mozart entitled Mozart: A Life, musicologist Maynard Solomon quotes Beethoven as telling his pupil Carl Czerny that this work, with its complex contrapuntal techniques, was Mozart's way of saying to the world, "Look what I could produce, if only you were ready for it." Beethoven thoroughly studied this quartet he much "admired and even copied into score", which he used as model for his String Quartet in A major, Opus 18 No. 5.

Even though it is one of Mozart's longest quartets, there is a great economy to the writing. The finale is as monothematic as anything Haydn ever wrote, with all the development deriving from the opening two phrases, and the other movements make use of a very small amount of melodic material for their development sections as well. The minuet for example, builds primarily on just two small motifs.
