= Haydn Quartets (Mozart) =

Set of compositions by Wolfgang Amadeus Mozart dedicated to Joseph Haydn

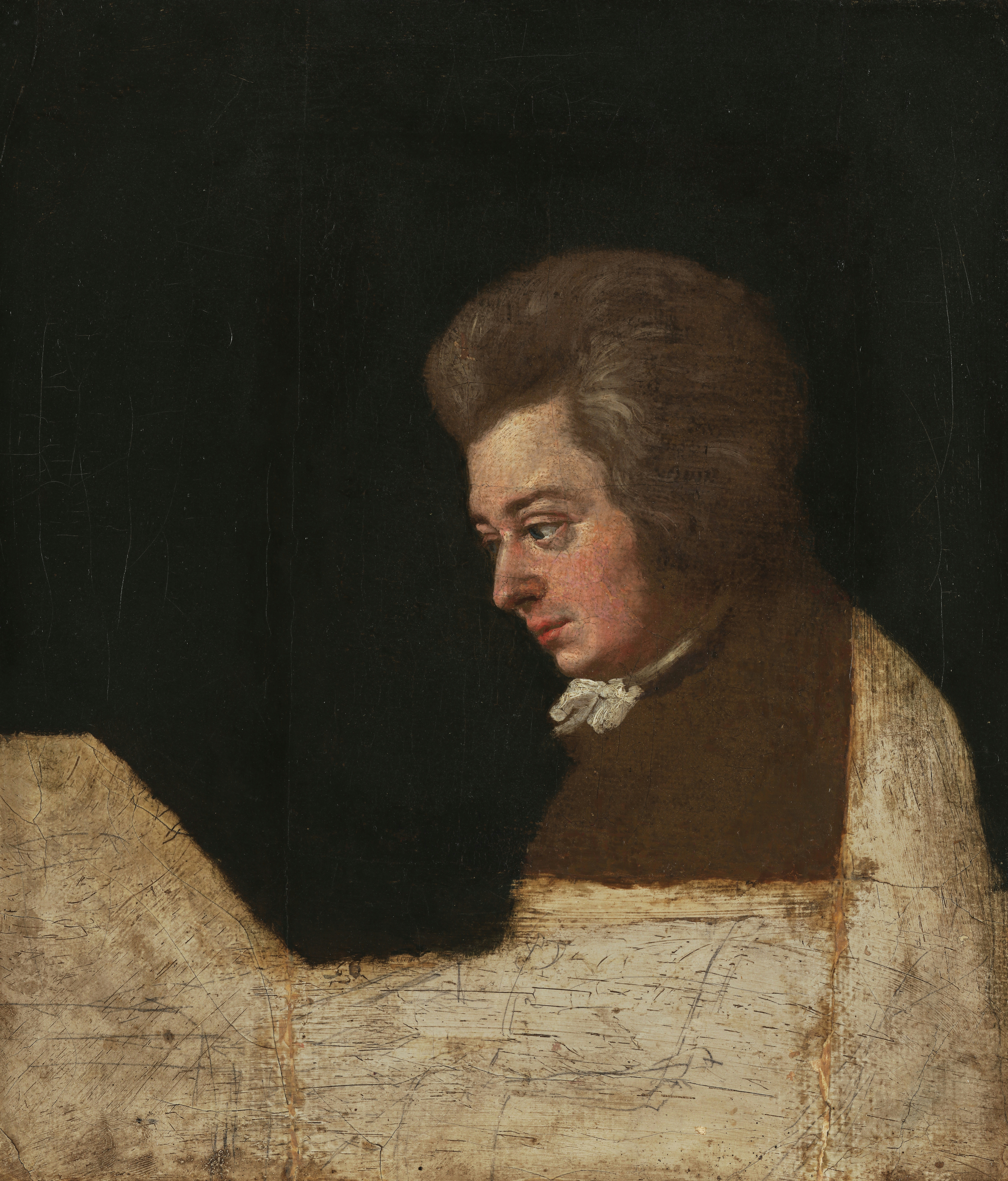
Portrait of Mozart at the piano (Joseph Lange, 1782/3)

The "Haydn" Quartets by Wolfgang Amadeus Mozart are a set of six string quartets published in 1785 in Vienna as his Op. 10, dedicated to the composer Joseph Haydn.

== The six quartets ==
The quartets were published in a set as Mozart's Opus 10 in Vienna, 1785. Mozart arranged the six quartets in the order of composition, except for reversing the order of K. 428 and K. 458.

- String Quartet No. 14 in G major, ("Spring"), K. 387, Op. 10, No. 1 (31 December 1782)
- String Quartet No. 15 in D minor, K. 421/417b, Op. 10, No. 2 (17 June 1783)
- String Quartet No. 16 in E♭ major, K. 428/421b, Op. 10, No. 4 (June–July 1783)
- String Quartet No. 17 in B♭ major ("Hunt"), K. 458, Op. 10, No. 3 (9 November 1784)
- String Quartet No. 18 in A major, K. 464, Op. 10, No. 5 (10 January 1785)
- String Quartet No. 19 in C major ("Dissonance"), K. 465, Op. 10, No. 6 (14 January 1785)

== Historical background ==
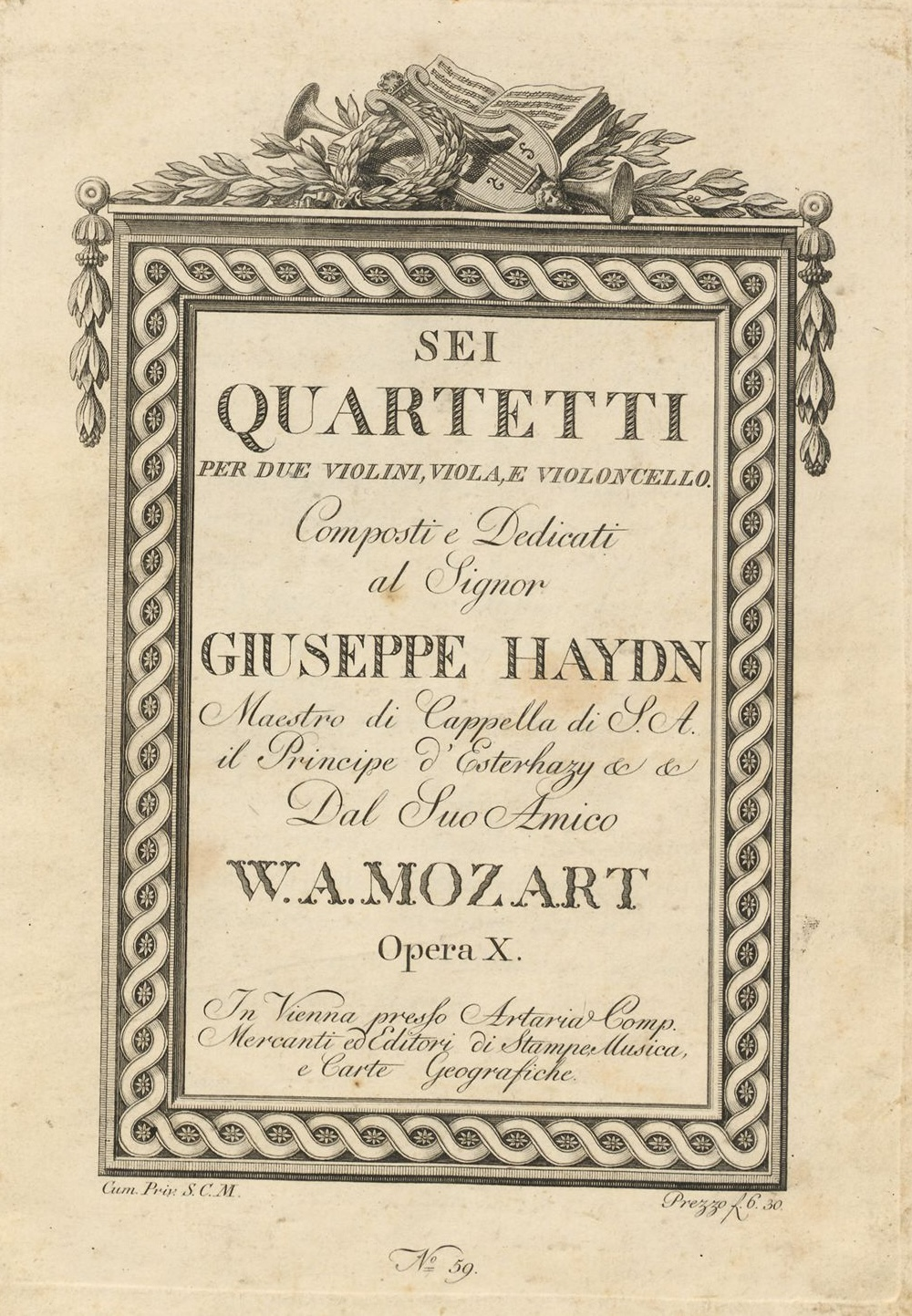
Cover page from Artaria's publication of Mozart's Six String Quartets.

Joseph Haydn is often referred to as the "father of the string quartet". Haydn completed his influential Op. 33 String Quartets in 1781, the year that Wolfgang Amadeus Mozart moved to Vienna to begin his freelance career. The two composers admired each other. In singer Michael Kelly's spurious account, Haydn once led a quartet session with Carl Ditters von Dittersdorf on second violin, Mozart on viola, and Johann Baptist Wanhal playing cello.

Mozart had not composed for the ensemble since his Viennese Quartets in 1773. He wrote six string quartets between 1782 and 1785, and dedicated them to Haydn.

Haydn first heard the quartets at two gatherings at Mozart's home, 15 January and 12 February 1785. After hearing them all, Haydn remarked to Mozart's father Leopold: "Before God, and as an honest man, I tell you that your son is the greatest composer known to me either in person or by name. He has taste, and, what is more, the most profound knowledge of composition." The comment was preserved in a letter Leopold wrote 16 February to his daughter Nannerl.

Before he finished composing them, Mozart pitched Jean-Georges Sieber on publishing his six quartets, requesting 50 Louis d'or as a fee. Artaria & Company announced the publication of all six quartets on September 17, 1785, in the Wiener Zeitung. According to Leopold Mozart, the firm paid the composer 100 ducats for the publishing rights.

== Dedication ==
Mozart's published dedication page (1 September 1785):

To my dear friend Haydn,

A father who had resolved to send his children out into the great world took it to be his duty to confide them to the protection and guidance of a very celebrated Man, especially when the latter by good fortune was at the same time his best Friend. Here they are then, O great Man and dearest Friend, these six children of mine. They are, it is true, the fruit of a long and laborious endeavor, yet the hope inspired in me by several Friends that it may be at least partly compensated encourages me, and I flatter myself that this offspring will serve to afford me solace one day. You, yourself, dearest friend, told me of your satisfaction with them during your last Visit to this Capital. It is this indulgence above all which urges me to commend them to you and encourages me to hope that they will not seem to you altogether unworthy of your favour. May it therefore please you to receive them kindly and to be their Father, Guide and Friend! From this moment I resign to you all my rights in them, begging you however to look indulgently upon the defects which the partiality of a Father's eye may have concealed from me, and in spite of them to continue in your generous Friendship for him who so greatly values it, in expectation of which I am, with all of my Heart, my dearest Friend, your most Sincere Friend,

W. A. Mozart

Like the rest of Artaria's publication, Mozart's letter is written in Italian, the language of high culture in 18th-century Vienna. Between 1784 and 1811, sixteen different composers would dedicate their string quartets to Haydn. Mozart's decision was probably designed to increase sales. Less than a year earlier, Ignaz Pleyel had also dedicated his Opus 2 Quartets to Haydn, and they sold widely. Mozart had urged his father to seek out Pleyel's Opus 1 Quartets, most likely because they followed Leopold's advice of composing simple, marketable music.

== Form and content ==
At this time, the quartet began to consistently have four movements, like the symphony form. The basic form of the six "Haydn" Quartets is as follows, with the second and third movements interchangeable in different works:

- First movement: Allegro in sonata form
- Second movement: Adagio or Andante in sonata form
- Third movement: Minuetto and Trio
- Fourth movement: Allegro in sonata, rondo, or variation form

The slow movement of these works, found in either the second or third movements, are highlighted as the "emotional center" of each quartet. They feature rich cantabile melodic writing with thematic multiplicity and embellishment that displays a departure from the Haydnesque mode.

The quartets also feature a wide range of emotional content from the Sturm und Drang of No. 15 in D minor, to the tonal mysteriousness of the openings of No. 16 in E♭ major, and No. 19 in C major, the "Dissonance", and then to the opera buffa styled light-heartedness in the finale of No. 17 in B♭ major, the "Hunt".

== Reception ==
The Haydn Quartets were immediately popular. Artaria reissued them in 1787 and 1789. The original plates wore out and had to be re-engraved for a 1791 reissue.

Critical reaction was both enthusiastic and perplexed. A 1789 review in Cramer's Magazin der Musik, said of Mozart's quartets, "he has a decided leaning towards the difficult and the unusual. But then, what great and elevated ideas he has too, testifying to a bold spirit!

Giuseppe Sarti wrote an attack on the "Dissonance" quartet (K. 465), describing sections as "barbarous", "execrable", and "miserable" in its use of whole-tone clusters and chromatic extremes. François-Joseph Fétis went so far as to correct the piece, implying that Mozart had made errors. By 1799, an anecdote published in Allgemeine musikalische Zeitung (AmZ) claimed that when Artaria sent the quartets to Italy for publication, they were returned because "the engraving is full of mistakes".

Heinrich Christoph Koch felt the works were praiseworthy for "their mixture of strict and free styles and the treatment of harmony". Favorable reports of the quartets came soon after their publication from newspapers in Salzburg and Berlin. In the early 19th century, Jérôme-Joseph de Momigny wrote an extended analysis of No. 15 in D minor, K. 421. Momigny used the setting of text based on Dido's Lament to discuss the emotional and expressive qualities of the first movement of this work.

The Haydn Quartets are some of Mozart's most famous works and represent the core of his work in the genre. They are considered "established keystones" of the chamber music repertoire and are heard frequently in concerts, radio broadcasts, and recordings.
