= String Quartet No. 15 (Mozart) =

1783 composition by W. A. Mozart

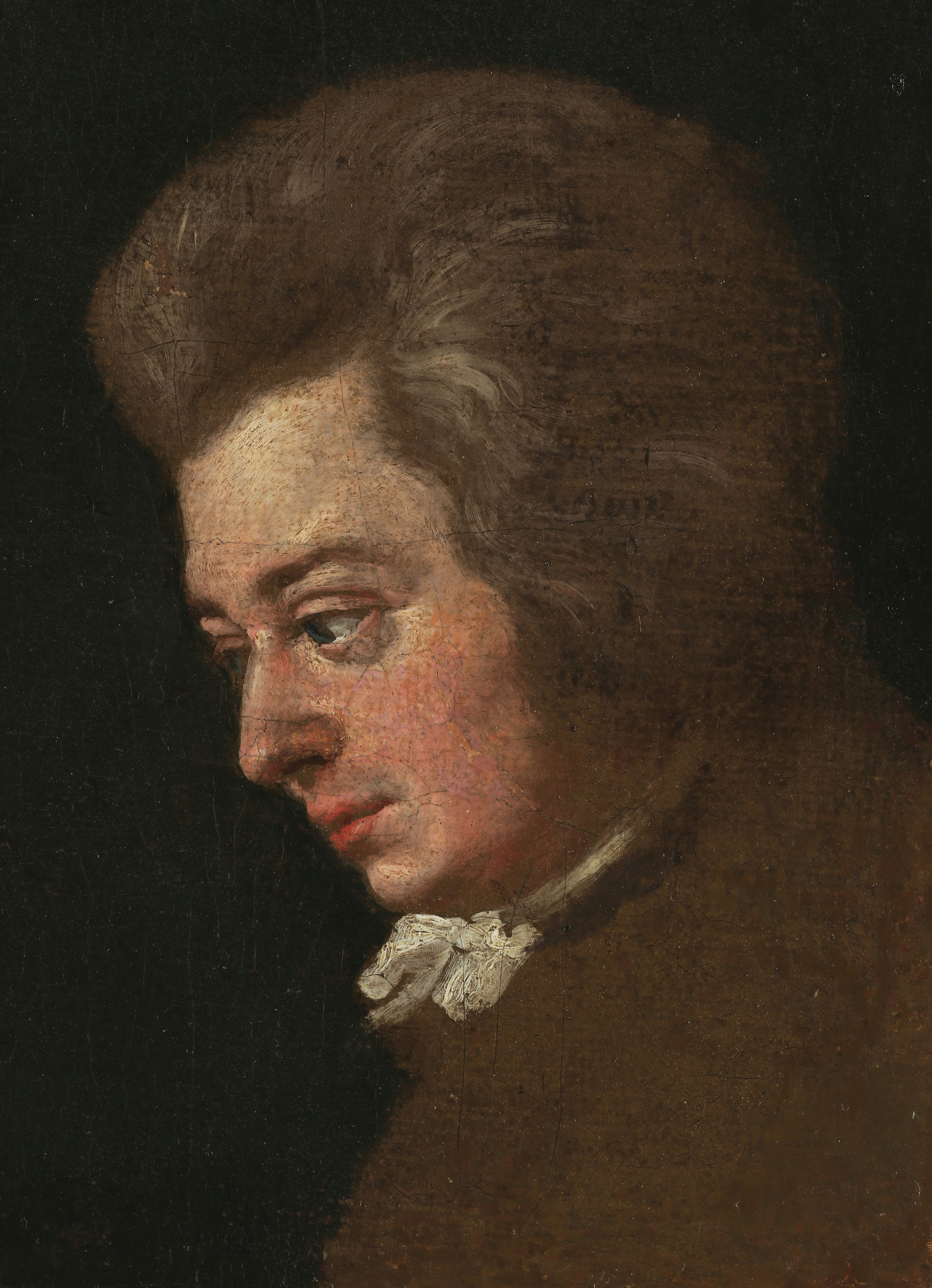
Detail of Lange's 1782–83 Mozart portrait

Wolfgang Amadeus Mozart's String Quartet No. 15 in D minor, K. 421/417b is the second of his quartets dedicated to Haydn and the only one of the set in a minor key. Though undated in the autograph, it is believed to have been completed in 1783, while his wife Constanze Mozart was in labour with her first child Raimund. (Note: "There is an anecdote, reported by Constanze to Vincent and Mary Novello in 1829, that Mozart wrote the D minor string quartet while she was in labour with their first child, Raimund, and therefore around 17 June 1783.") Constanze stated that the rising string figures in the second movement corresponded to her cries from the other room.

== Structure ==
I. Allegro moderato

II. Andante

III. Menuetto and Trio – Allegretto

IV. Allegretto ma non troppo – Più allegro
Performed by the Strub Quartet

Performances of the whole string quartet vary in length from 23 to 33 minutes. It is in four movements:

1. Allegro moderato
2. Andante (F major)
3. Menuetto and Trio (the latter in D major) – Allegretto
4. Allegretto ma non troppo – Più allegro

The first movement is characterized by a sharp contrast between the aperiodicity of the first subject group, characterized by Arnold Schoenberg as "prose-like", and the "wholly periodic" second subject group. In the Andante and the Menuetto, "normal expectations of phraseology are confounded." The main part of the Menuetto is in minuet and trio sonata form, while "the contrasting major-mode Trio ... is ... almost embarrassingly lightweight on its own ... [but] makes a wonderful foil to the darker character of the Minuet." The last movement is a set of variations. The movement ends in a Picardy third.

== Arrangements ==
An arrangement of the Menuetto and Trio for violin and piano is in Suzuki Violin Volume 7.

== Notes and references ==
Notes

=== Sources ===
- Finscher, Ludwig, ed. (2007). Mozart: The Ten Celebrated String Quartets. Translated by Kinloch Anderson. Kassel: Bärenreiter. ISMN 9790006201181.
- Hildesheimer, Wolfgang (1991). Mozart. New York: Noonday Press. ISBN 978-0-374-52298-8 – via Internet Archive.
- Irving, John (1998). Mozart: The 'Haydn' Quartets. Cambridge: Cambridge University Press. ISBN 0-521-58475-2.
- Polesky, Mark (n.d.). "Suzuki Violin Pieces in their Original Forms – Volume 7". www.markpolesky.com.
- Rosen, Charles (1988). Sonata Forms. New York: W. W. Norton. ISBN 9780393302196 – via Internet Archive.
