= String Quartet No. 16 (Mozart) =

1783 composition by W. A. Mozart

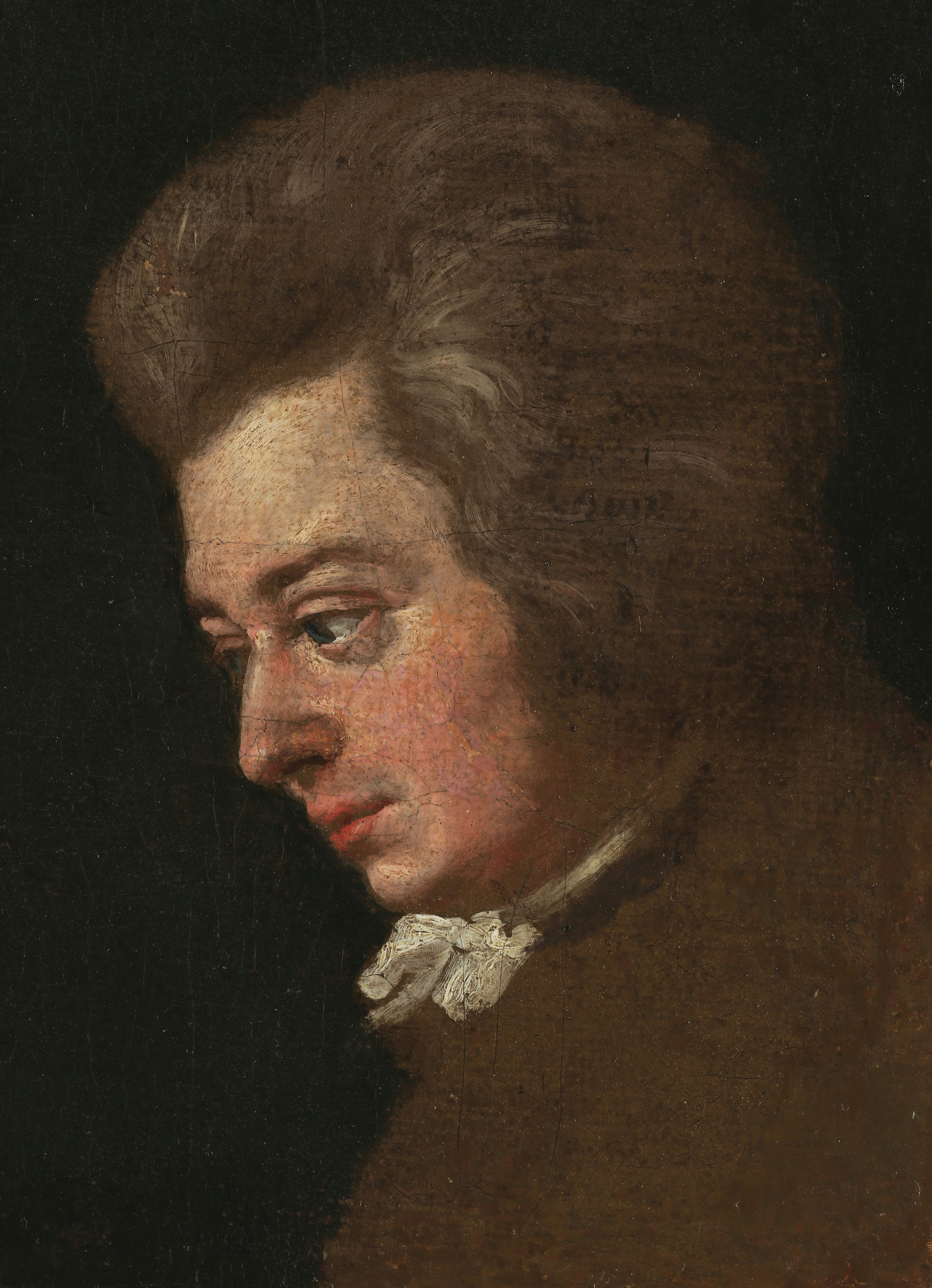
Detail of Lange's 1782–83 Mozart portrait

The String Quartet No. 16 in E♭ major, K. 428/421b, was composed by Wolfgang Amadeus Mozart in 1783. This is the third of the Haydn Quartets, a set of six string quartets he wrote during his first few years in Vienna and later dedicated to Joseph Haydn.

It is in four movements:

1. Allegro non troppo
2. Andante con moto, A♭ major
3. Menuetto: Allegro, Trio (the latter in B♭ major)
4. Allegro vivace

The first movement is highly chromatic, with the chromaticized bridge theme in the exposition being one of several examples, the end of the exposition being another.

The slow movement "invokes ... the slow movement of Haydn's Op. 20 No. 1. The ostentatious dissonances of its opening almost have an antique flavour, caused by the collision of semitonal ascents and descents, and this strongly suggests the opening subject of the first movement, so surprisingly isolated there." Other commentators hear it as pointing forward to Johannes Brahms.

Throughout the third movement Mozart "makes use of a pedal point in the bass, thus giving the music an entrancing rustic effect."

The last movement "can best be described as being an abridged rondo form."
