= String Quartet (Blumenfeld) =

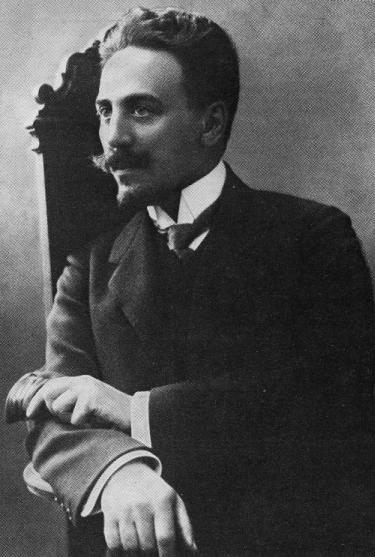
Felix Blumenfeld

Felix Blumenfeld's String Quartet in F major, Op. 26, is the composer's only work for the medium. Published in 1898, the quartet was dedicated to music publisher Mitrofan Belyayev.

== Structure ==
The work is structured in four movements:

1. Allegro – Poco più tranquillo – Tempo I – Allegro molto
2. Presto – Molto meno mosso – Tempo del Scherzo (Presto) – Più mosso
3. Andantino – Poco più mosso – Largamente
4. Finale: Allegro molto – Un poco più tranquillo – Più mosso – Tempo I (Tranquillo) – Più tranquillo – Più mosso – Coda: Molto più mosso – Prestissimo

The first commercial recording of the quartet by the Odessa quartet was released by Profil in 2015.
