= String Quartet No. 22 (Mozart) =

1790 composition by W. A. Mozart

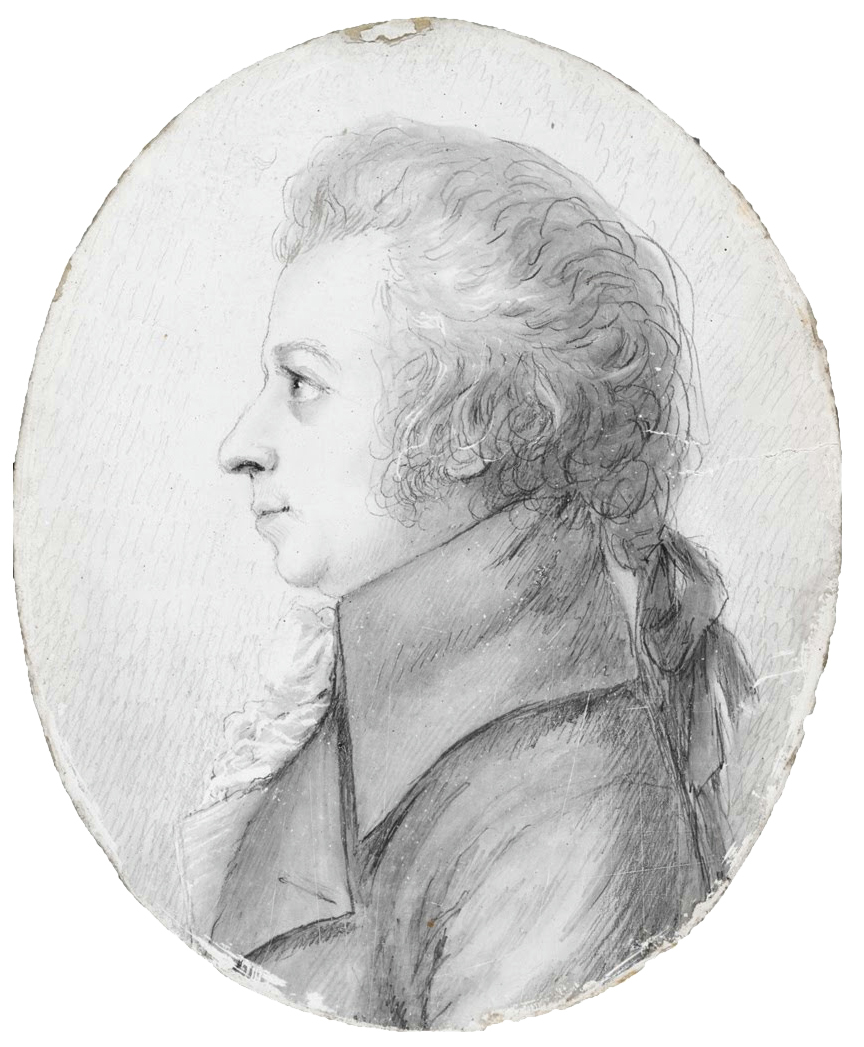
Stock's 1789 miniature of Mozart

Wolfgang Amadeus Mozart composed his String Quartet No. 22 in B♭ major, K. 589, in 1790 in Vienna after a visit to the court of King Friedrich Wilhelm II, King of Prussia. Mozart traveled with his friend and piano student Karl Alois, Prince Lichnowsky, and during these travels they had the opportunity to stop in Potsdam and attend an audience for Mozart at the King's court. Mozart was under financial stress and hoped to hold a position at the court of King Wilhelm II. Wilhelm was an amateur cellist, which is why the set of Prussian Quartets, of which the String Quartet No. 22 is a part, features an unusually prominent role for the cello. Despite such compositional efforts by Mozart to gain employment from the king, these quartets were sold without any dedication and published by Artaria.

== Background ==
During the inception of the quartet, Mozart was in debt to Artaria because he had a failed subscription deal with that publisher. He was also in debt with his landlord and had conflicts over his debts with a pawnbroker. It was under these circumstances that he had his audience with King Friedrich Wilhelm II. The choice of Mozart to compose a prominent role for the cello was seemingly a strategic choice as the King himself was an amateur cellist. Mozart was never employed at the Prussian court, nor did the quartets ever receive a dedicatee. Mozart sold these quartets to Artaria so that, as he said in personal letters, "[He] could have cash in hand for [his] difficulties". These financial difficulties contribute to the quartet's unique character and style that contrast with Mozart's other late quartets.

In 1991, the German-British musicologist Erik Smith discovered a short movement for string quartet in B♭ major, which was long thought to be lost. It was given the catalogue number K. 589a and received its premiere recording in 1991 for the then work-in-progress Complete Mozart Edition, performed by the Academy of St. Martin in the Fields' Chamber Ensemble. Smith stated that the work was most likely an original third movement to the quartet, K. 589.

== Movements ==
=== I. Allegro ===
Primary theme in the violin

Secondary theme in cello

The first movement is marked Allegro and is in B♭ major. It is in sonata form. The opening primary theme is marked by descending sixteenths. The phrase structure is a six-bar phrase rather than the typical four or eight that are characteristic of Mozart. The secondary theme in F major is uniquely introduced in the cello, higher in the instrument's register. The statement of the secondary theme in the cello is an example of Mozart's hopes of employment from the amateur-cellist-king appearing in his writing. The theme is marked by cascading eighth note gestures and syncopated rhythms. Many of the thematic ideas are recycled from a fragment of an incomplete clarinet quintet that Mozart had written earlier.

=== II. Larghetto ===
Theme of second movement in cello

The second movement is marked Larghetto and in the key of E♭ major. The time signature is in cut time and the theme is first presented in the cello—yet another instance of this quartet's historical context appearing in the composition. As in the first movement, the part is higher in the register for the cello. The theme is marked sotto voce.

=== III. Menuetto moderato and Trio ===
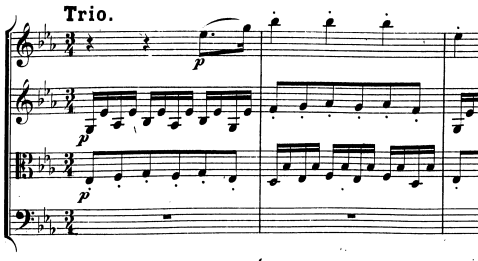
The of Trio

Theme of Minuet

The original minuet, discovered in 1991 (see above) is noticeably different, stylistically. It is built upon a lilting theme in B♭ major, it whereas the minuet that Mozart decided to include begins with a forte B♭ major chord. The original minuet also lacks a trio, the middle section of the movement commonly included in the 18th century, which may be one of the reasons that Mozart decided to rewrite the movement.

The published third movement is a minuet and trio with the tempo marking of Moderato. The minuet is in B♭ major and the trio is in E♭ major. The first violin states the main thematic material of this movement and the other instruments accompany with ostinato figures. While not given large thematic material as in the previous movements, the cello is given the final note of both sections of the trio without any other voice playing.

=== IV. Allegro assai ===
Theme of fourth movement

The final movement is marked Allegro assai and is in 6/8. The movement is composed as a rondo. The key is B♭ major and the movement is a jig-like melody first presented in the first and second violins and then shared across the quartet. Each of the motives of this movement is played in every voice and overall voicing is very balanced.
