= Viennese Quartets (Mozart) =

Six string quartets by W. A. Mozart (1773)

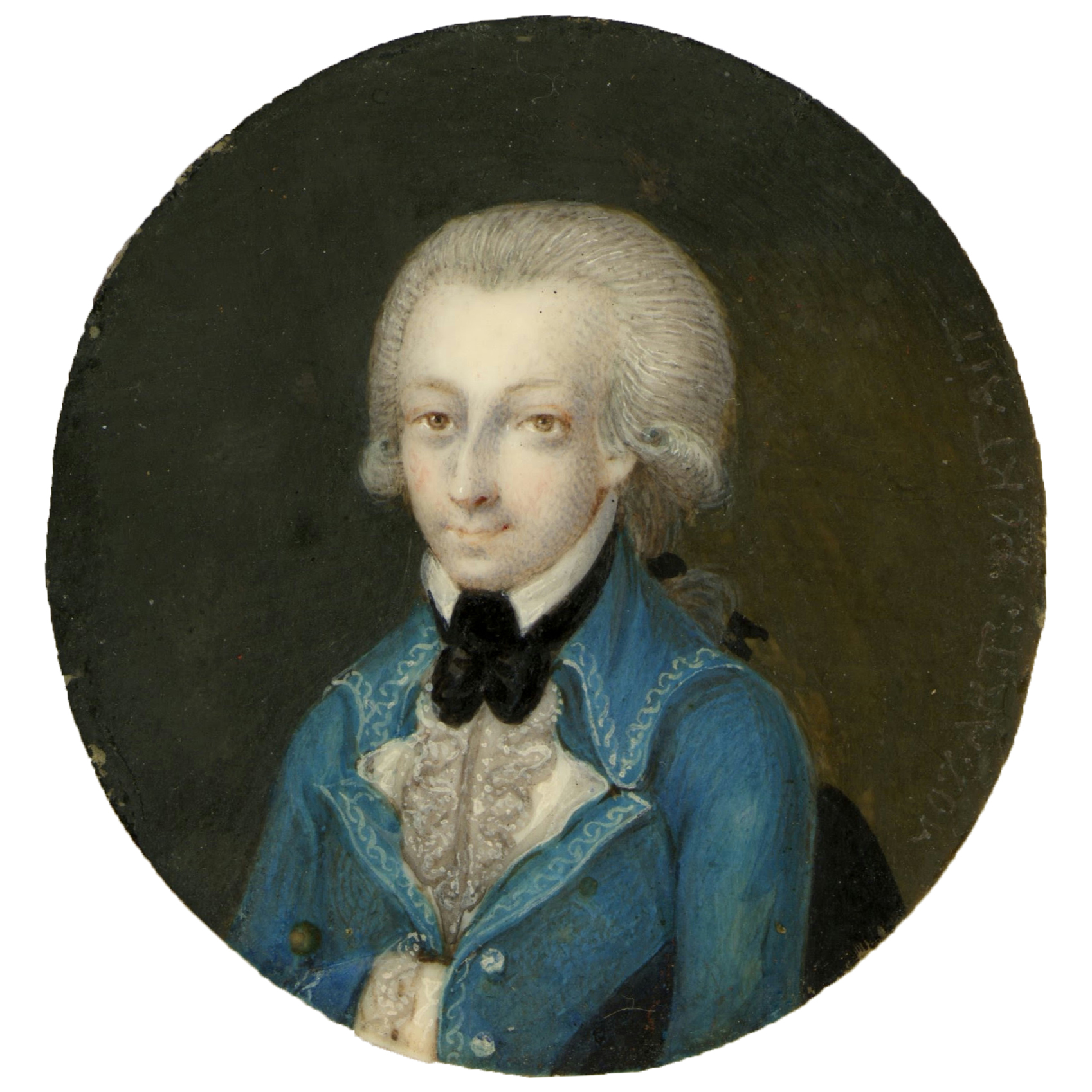
1773 miniature of Mozart

The six string quartets, K. 168–173, were composed by Wolfgang Amadeus Mozart in late 1773 in Vienna. These are popularly known as the Viennese Quartets. They were circulated in manuscript copies by the publisher Christoph Torricella in 1785. But although Mozart may have hoped to have them printed at the time, they were published only posthumously by Johann André in 1801 as Mozart's Op. 94.

These quartets represent a considerable advance on the Milanese Quartets from less than a year before. Each contains four movements, including minuets and trios. Mozart had been exposed to recently published quartets by Joseph Haydn (Opp. 9 and 17) and was incorporating many of their elements. There is considerably more fugal writing in these quartets than in his previous ones. In fact, the last movements of both K. 168 and K. 173 are fully-developed fugues. The latter, in particular, contains elaborate contrapuntal stretto writing. However, not all scholars agree with the importance of Haydn's quartets as an influence. Stanley Sadie argues there is not enough evidence that Mozart was familiar with Haydn's recent quartets, and, if he was, he points out that the Viennese quartets fall well below the standard of their models. Finally, he notes that the counterpoint used in the quartets would have occurred in other composers of the period who were accessible to Mozart, such as Gassmann, Monn, Richter and Wagenseil. In the absence of any evidence surrounding the writing of the quartets, the question of Haydn's influence remains unresolved.

== No. 8 in F major, K. 168 ==
The work is in four movements:

1. Allegro
2. Andante, in F minor
3. Menuetto – Trio, trio in B♭ major
4. Allegro

The first movement is in sonata form. The slow movement in F minor is a triple-meter canon on the familiar theme also used in the finale of Haydn's Op. 20 No. 5 quartet in the same key, and that Mozart would much later use in the "Kyrie" from his Requiem. The third movement is in ternary form, with a minuet and trio. The finale is a fugue which is also similar to one of the finales of Op. 20, this time the A major quartet (No. 6).

== No. 9 in A major, K. 169 ==
The work is in four movements:

1. Molto allegro
2. Andante, in D major
3. Menuetto – Trio, trio in E major
4. Rondeaux (Allegro)

== No. 10 in C major, K. 170 ==
The work is in four movements:

1. Andante
2. Menuetto – Trio, trio in C minor
3. Un poco adagio, in G major
4. Rondeaux (Allegro)

The opening movement is a theme and four variations with a theme that resembles the variation theme used in Haydn's Quartet Op. 9, No. 5, in B♭. The second phrase of the slow movement contains the opening theme of Haydn's Op. 9, No. 4, in D minor.

== No. 11 in E♭ major, K. 171 ==
The work is in four movements:

1. Adagio – Allegro assai – Adagio
2. Menuetto – Trio, trio in A♭ major
3. Andante, in C minor
4. Allegro assai

== No. 12 in B♭ major, K. 172 ==
The work is in four movements:

1. Allegro spiritoso
2. Adagio, in E♭ major
3. Menuetto – Trio, trio in G minor
4. Allegro assai

== No. 13 in D minor, K. 173 ==
The work is in four movements:

1. Allegro ma molto moderato
2. Andantino grazioso, in D major
3. Menuetto – Trio, trio in F major
4. Allegro

The beginning of the minuet is similar to, and based on, the minuet from Haydn's Op. 9, No. 4, in D minor. The finale is a fugue whose subject begins with a descending chromatic fourth. There exists a simpler version of the last movement, which, according to Irving, suggests that Mozart took great pains over the counterpoint.
