= String Quartet No. 23 (Mozart) =

1790 composition by W. A. Mozart

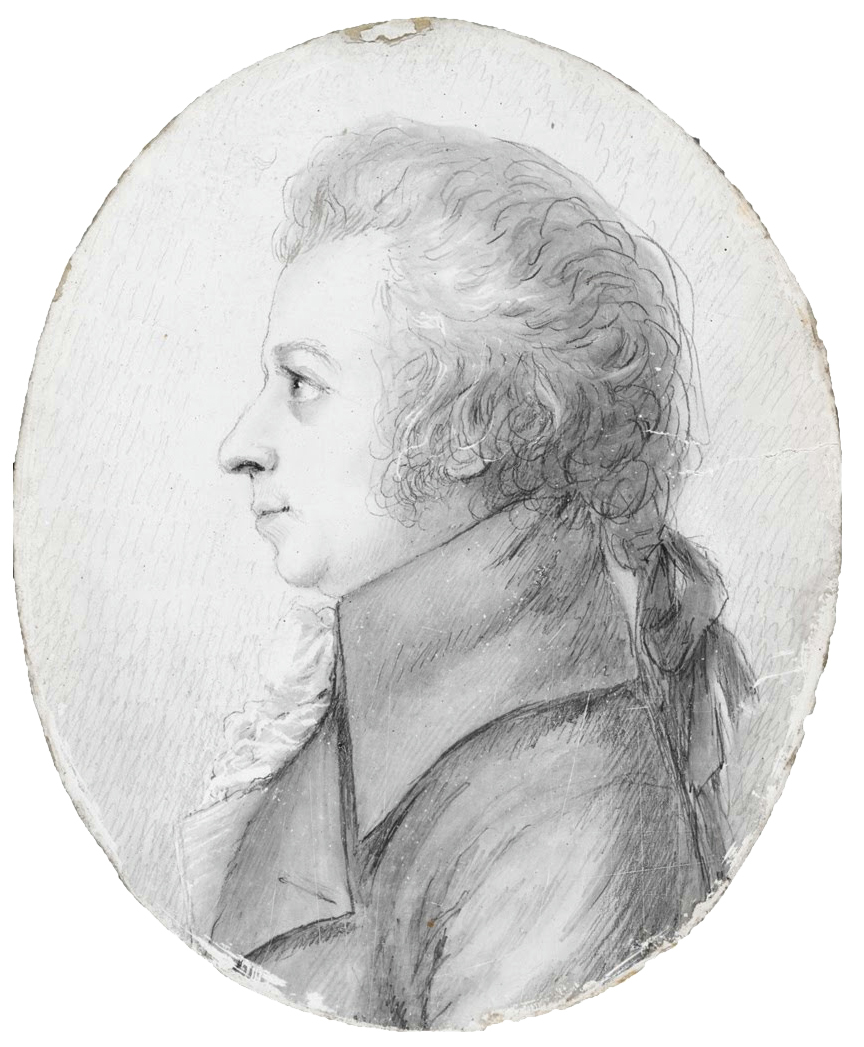
Stock's 1789 miniature of Mozart

The String Quartet No. 23 in F major, K. 590, was written in June 1790 by Wolfgang Amadeus Mozart. It is the third of the Prussian Quartets and the last String Quartet he wrote before his death in December 1791.

There are four movements in this string quartet:

1. Allegro moderato
2. Andante / Allegretto (Note: The 2nd movement is marked 'Andante' in the autograph, and 'Allegretto' in the 1st print edition.) in C major
3. Menuetto: Allegretto – Trio
4. Allegro

The quartet was written for and dedicated to the King of Prussia, Friedrich Wilhelm II, an amateur cellist. It is written in a similar style to the quartets of Joseph Haydn. Mozart and his friend Karl Lichnowsky met the king in Potsdam in April 1789. Mozart played before the king in Berlin on 26 May of that year.

The Menuetto is distinguished by the evolution, in the main minuet sections, from a fairly conventional theme to a highly chromatic, driven transition.

A typical performance of the quartet lasts 23 to 25 minutes.
