= Milanese Quartets (Mozart) =

Six string quartets (1772–1773) by W. A. Mozart

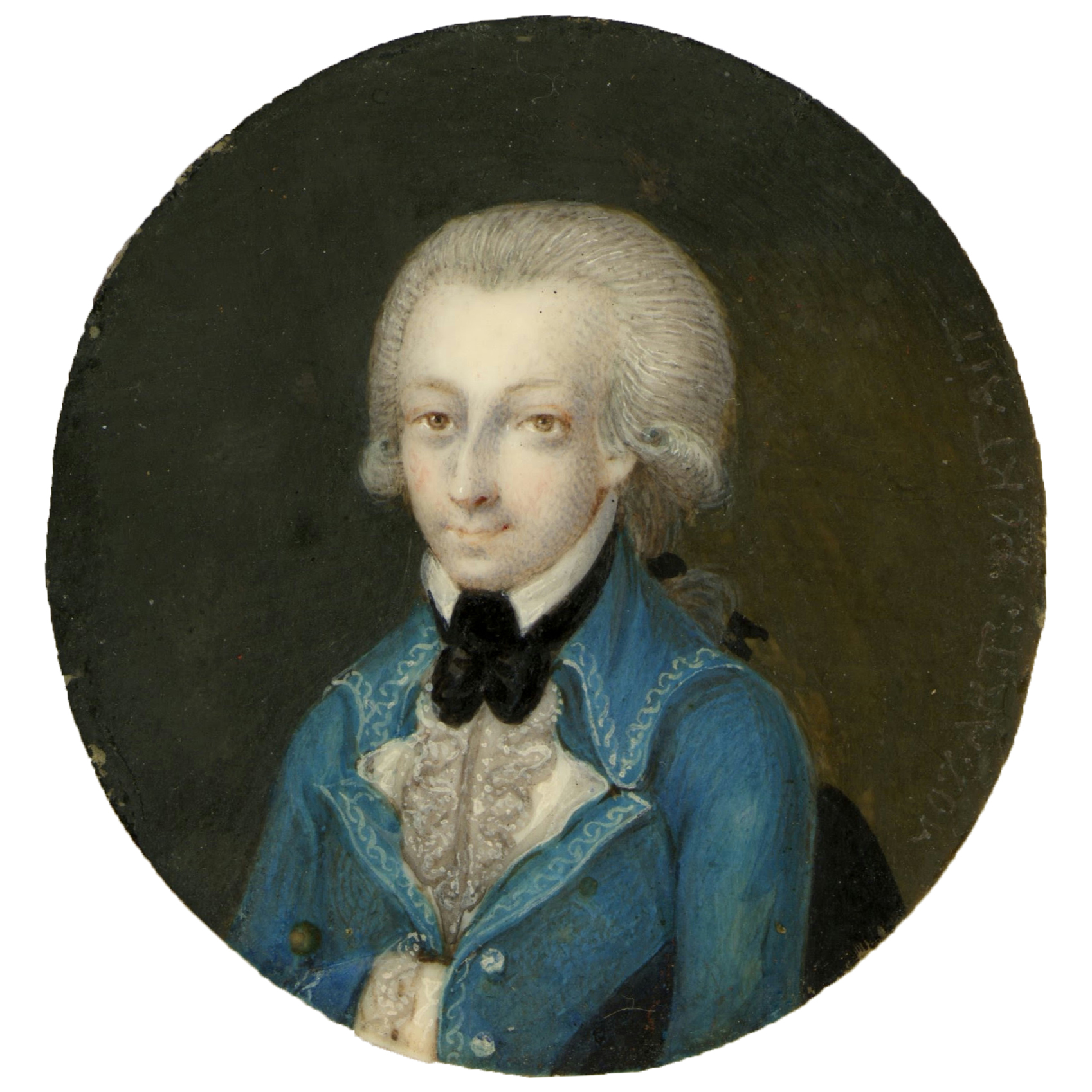
1773 miniature of Mozart

The Milanese Quartets, K. 155–160, are a set of six string quartets composed by Wolfgang Amadeus Mozart in late 1772 and early 1773 when he was sixteen and seventeen years old. They are called 'Milanese' because Mozart composed them in Milan while he was working on his opera Lucio Silla. Before this set was composed, Mozart had written one earlier string quartet (K. 80/73f in 1770), so these six quartets are numbered from No. 2 to No. 7. The quartets are written in a plan of keys of D–G–C–F–B♭–E♭ following the circle of fourths.

All six quartets have only three movements. Four of the quartets (K. 156–159) have middle movements in the minor mode, one of which (K. 159) is, unusually, not a slow movement, but a fiery sonata–allegro. The finales are generally lightweight, whether in the form of minuets or rondos. Irving comments that although these quartets are predominantly light in idiom, it would be a mistake to consider them lightweight works, pointing to the quality of the slow movements in particular and the use of counterpoint to create interest in the writing for the inner parts.

The sixth edition of the Köchel catalogue, published in 1964, amended the catalogue numbers of the first two quartets to K. 134a and 134b, respectively, and the last quartet to K. 159a.

The autograph manuscript of the quartets is preserved in the Berlin State Library.

== No. 2 in D major, K. 155/134a ==
Written in the autumn of 1772 in Bolzano, the string quartet is in three movements:

1. Allegro
2. Andante in A major
3. Molto allegro

== No. 3 in G major, K. 156/134b ==
Written at the end of 1772 in Milan, the string quartet is in three movements:

1. Presto
2. Adagio in E minor
3. Tempo di Menuetto – Trio in G minor

== No. 4 in C major, K. 157 ==
Written at the end of 1772 in Milan and premiered in early 1773, the string quartet is in three movements:

1. Allegro
2. Andante in C minor
3. Presto

== No. 5 in F major, K. 158 ==
Written and premiered in early 1773 in Milan, the string quartet is in three movements:

1. Allegro
2. Andante un poco allegretto in A minor
3. Tempo di Menuetto - Trio in F minor

== No. 6 in B♭ major, K. 159 ==
Written and premiered in early 1773 in Milan, the string quartet is in three movements:

1. Andante
2. Allegro in G minor
3. Rondo allegro grazioso

== No. 7 in E♭ major, K. 160/159a ==
Written and premiered in early 1773 in Milan, the string quartet is in three movements:

1. Allegro
2. Un poco adagio in A♭ major
3. Presto

. The second movement is remarkable for its non-tonic opening.
