= String Quartet in C major =

String Quartet in C major may refer to:

- No. 2 of the String Quartets, Op. 20 (Haydn)
- No. 3 of the String Quartets, Op. 33 (Haydn)
- No. 2 of the String Quartets, Op. 50 (Haydn)
- No. 1 of the String Quartets, Op. 64 (Haydn)
- No. 3 "Kaiserquartett" of the String Quartets, Op. 76 (Haydn)
- String Quartet No. 4 (Mozart)
- String Quartet No. 10 (Mozart)
- String Quartet No. 19 (Mozart)
- String Quartet No. 9 (Beethoven)
- String Quartet No. 11 (Dvořák)
- String Quartet No. 4 (Bartók)
- String Quartet No. 1 (Szymanowski)
- String Quartet No. 1 (Shostakovich)
- String Quartet No. 2 (Britten)
