= Afrikaners Landgenote =

South African Afrikaner folk song

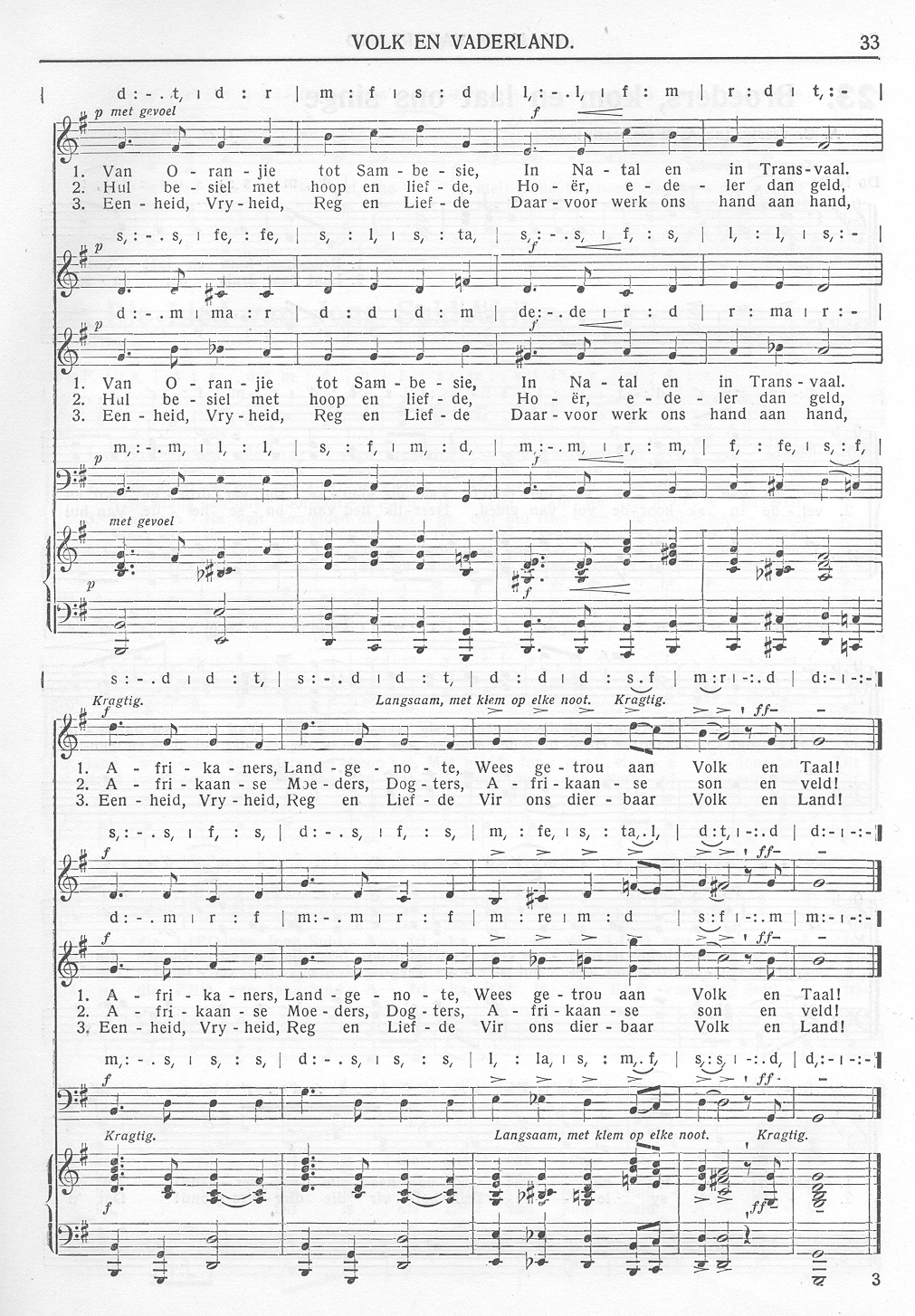
Sheet music copy

"Afrikaners Landgenote" or "Afrikaners Landgenoten" ([afriˈkɑːnərs ˈlant.χənuətə]) is a South African Afrikaner folk song. It is set to the tune of "Deutschlandlied" and "Gott erhalte Franz den Kaiser". It is a translation of Deutschlandlied, It was written by Nico Hofmeyr and was intended as an alternative Afrikaans-language national anthem for South Africa alongside "God Save the King" before "Die Stem van Suid-Afrika".

Afrikaners Landgenote.ogg

== History ==
Following the creation of the Union of South Africa, Afrikaners objected to "God Save the King" being the only official anthem of South Africa. However they had no desire to restore the old anthems of the former Boer Republics. Accordingly, the Genootskap van Regte Afrikaners held a contest to create an Afrikaans-language national anthem. "Afrikaners Landgenote" was proposed for the contest, and though another song titled "Waar Tafelberg begin" (English: Where Table Mountain begins) received initial support, the society decided to go with "Afrikaners Landgenote" to propose as the Afrikaans co-national anthem. Though this campaign failed with "Die Stem van Suid-Afrika" being selected as the co-national anthem in 1938, "Afrikaners Langenote" became popular as an unofficial national anthem.

The song remained popular as an Afrikaans folk song and was sung prior to the State President of South Africa F. W. de Klerk announcing the end of apartheid in the Parliament of South Africa.

== Analysis ==
The first verse focused on Afrikaners being loyal to South Africa and to the Afrikaans language. The second verse affirms loyalty to the Afrikaans language first as part of Afrikaner culture though also looks at Afrikaner women. The last verse is equivalent to the current German "Deutschlandlied" anthem, calling for "unity, freedom and justice" in South Africa.

== Lyrics ==
Original Afrikaans Text	English Translation
I Afrikaners, landgenote, wees getrou aan volk en taal, Aan julselwe, aan elkander, Van die Kaap tot in die Vaal, Van Oranje tot Sambesie, in Natal en in Transvaal. Afrikaners, landgenote, wees getrou aan volk en taal! II Afrikaanse moeders, dogters, Afrikaanse son en veld Is beroemd deur heel die wêreld, Staan in boek en lied vermeld Hul besiel met hoop en liefde, Hoër, edeler dan geld Afrikaanse moeders, dogters, Afrikaanse son en veld! III Eenheid, vryheid, reg en liefde, In ons dierbaar vaderland Daarvoor stry ons, daarvoor ly ons, Almal same in ons land Eenheid, vryheid, reg en liefde, Daarvoor werk ons hand aan hand Eenheid, vryheid, reg en liefde, In ons dierbaar vaderland!	I Afrikaners, compatriots, Be faithful to folk and language, To yourselves, to each other, From the Cape to the Vaal, From the Orange, to Zambesi, in Natal, and in Transvaal. Afrikaners, compatriots, Be faithful to folk and language! II Afrikaans mothers, daughters, Afrikaans sun and field, Are renowned throughout the whole world, And is written in book and song, They inspire with hope and love, Higher, more noble than riches. Afrikaans mothers, daughters, Afrikaans sun and field! III Unity, freedom, justice, and love, In our precious fatherland, Therefor, we strive, therefore, we suffer, Everyone together in our land. Unity, freedom, justice, and love, Therefor, we work hand in hand, Unity, freedom, justice, and love, In our precious fatherland!
