= Translations of Gott erhalte Franz den Kaiser =

Austro-Hungarian national anthem

"Gott erhalte Franz den Kaiser" (lit. "God Save Emperor Franz") is an anthem to the Austrian Emperor Francis II, set to music by Joseph Haydn. The anthem served as the national anthem of Austria-Hungary.

The German lyrics were written by Lorenz Leopold Haschka (1749–1827). The anthem was translated and adapted into many of the languages that were spoken in the Empire.

== Hungarian ==
Tartsa Isten, óvja Isten

Text: BULYOVSZKY Gyula and NÁDASKAY Lajos. Alterations by KECSKEMÉTHY Aurél.

Hungarian original

Tartsa Isten, óvja Isten
Királyunk s a közhazát!
Erőt lelve a szent hitben,
Ossza bölcs parancsszavát!
Hadd védjük ős koronáját,
Bárhonnét fenyegesse vész!
Magyar honnal Habsburg trónját
Egyesíté égi kéz.

Nyílt, őszinte, jámbor szívvel,
Tartozás és jog ha hív,
Bátran, ha kell, s jó reménnyel
Szálljunk a csatára ki!
Küzdjük ki, mit hős seregünk
Annyiszor nyert: a babért!
Vért és vagyont császárunkért,
Vért s vagyont a közhonért!

Mit polgár iparja szerzett,
Védje hűn a hősi kéz;
Győzzön szellemfegyverével
A művészet és az ész!
Dicsőség áradjon s áldás
Egyaránt el a hazán,
Boldog béke napsugára
Tündököljön Ausztrián!

Tartsunk össze mind; hatalmat
Egyetértés kapcsa ád.
Hogyha egyesült erőnk hat,
Győzve könnyen bármi gát.
Mint testvérek összetartva,
Légyen egy a honfi cél!
Üdv a császárra s hazára:
Ausztria örökkön él!

Ím, császárunk oldalánál,
Véle szív- és törzsrokon,
Ragyog hervadhatatlan bájjal
Császárnénk kegygazdagon.
Árassza az ég kegyelme
Legmagasabb ajándokát
Ferenc Józsefre s Erzsébetre:
Éljen a Habsburg család!

English translation

May God keep, may God protect
Our King and his parliament!
Finding strength in the holy faith
may it share in his wise command!
Let us protect his ancient crown
From wherever calamity would threaten it!
Hungarian homeland with Habsburg throne
Was united by the celestial hand.

== Hebrew ==
עֹז לַמֶּלֶךְ

פֿאָלקסהימנע

(by Simon Bacher)

Hebrew original

יָגֵן, יַעֲזֹר, יִנְצֹר, יְחוֹנֵן,
אֵל מַלְכֵּנוּ וְאַרְצֵנוּ;
עֹז אֱמוּנָתוֹ כִּסְאוֹ יְכוֹנֵן,
וְחָכְמַת יָדָיו תַּנְחֵנוּ.
נֵזֶר אֲבוֹתָיו נִשְׁמְרָה יַחַד,
תָּמִיד מוּל כָּל הַקָּמִים;
עֵסְטְרַייךְ וְהַבְּסְבּוּרְג מִבְּלִי כָּחַד,
חֲבוּרִים הֵם כָּל הַיָּמִים.

תְּמִימֵי לֵבָב נֶפֶשׁ נְחָרֵף,
בְּעַד צְדָקוֹת וּמֵשָׁרִים;
וּבְתִקְוַת עֹז נַחְגֹּר חֶרֶב,
בְּעֵת הָרֶשַׁע רֹאשׁ יָרִים.
כְּמוֹ בַּיָּמִים צִבְאוֹתֵינוּ
עָנְדוּ לָמוֹ זֵר תְּהִלָּה;
נִתְּנָה נֶפֶשׁ בְּעַד מַלְכֵּנוּ,
בְּעַד אַרְצֵנוּ בְּלֵב גִּילָה.

בֶּטַח בֵּין הַחוֹמוֹתַיִם,
יְדֵי הַלּוֹחֲמִים יָגִינוּ
עַל כָּל אֲשֶׁר בַּעֲמַל כַּפַּיִם,
מַדָּע וְהַשְׂכֵּל הֵכִינוּ.
בְּרָכָה תִּהְיֶה מְנָת הָאָרֶץ,
וּבְבִרְכָתָהּ תְּהִלָּתָהּ;
שְׁלוֹם־אֵל סְבִיבָהּ מִבְּלִי פָּרֶץ,
וּבְאוֹר שֶׁמֶשׁ שַׁלְוָתָהּ!

בְּקֶשֶׁר אַמִּיץ נִתְחַבְּרָה,
כִּי בַחֶבֶר גַּם הָעֹז;
יִהְיֶה הַכָּבֵד קַל בִּמְהֵרָה,
אִם יִתְאַחֲדוּ הַכֹּחוֹת.
מַטְרַת קֹדֶשׁ לְעֵינֵינוּ,
בְּחַבְלֵי אַחְוָה מְאֻלָּמִים;
עֹז לַמֶּלֶךְ, עֹז לְאַרְצֵנוּ,
עֵסְטְרַייךְ יַעֲמֹד לְעוֹלָמִים.

רַבַּת־יֹפִי, חֵן וַחֲנִינָה,
תֵּשֵׁב מַלְכָּה בְּצִדֵּהוּ;
עֶדְנַת נַפְשָׁהּ לֹא הִזְקִינָה,
בְּנֹעַם וְהָדָר תְּעַטְּרֵהוּ.
יְבָרֵךְ אֵל רוּחָהּ הָרְחָבָה,
חַסְדּוֹ יְהִי לָהּ חוֹמָה וְחַיִל;
יְחִי פְּרַאנְץ יָאזֶעף וֶאֱלִישֶׁבַע,
וְכָל בֵּית הַבְּסְבּוּרְג יְבָרֵךְ אֵל.

English translation

//Missing//

== Czech ==
Czech translation of the Austrian anthem during the reign of Franz Joseph I (1848–1916)

Lidová hymna

Czech original

Zachovej nám, Hospodine
Císaře a naši zem
Dej, ať z víry moc mu plyne
Ať je moudrým vladařem
Hajme věrně trůnu Jeho
Proti nepřátelům všem!
Osud trůnu Habsburského
Rakouska je osudem.

Plňme věrně povinnosti
Braňme právo počestně
A když třeba, s ochotností
V boj se dejme statečně
Na paměti věčné mějme
Slávu vojska vítěznou
Jmění, krev i život dejme
Za Císaře, za vlast svou!

Čeho nabyl občan pilný
Vojín zbraní zastávej
Uměním i vědou silný
Duch se vzmáhej, jasně skvěj
Bože račiž přízeň dáti
Naší vlasti milené
Slunce Tvé ať věčně svítí
Na Rakousko blažené.

Stůjme k sobě v každou chvíli
Svornost jenom moci dá
Spojené kde vládnou síly
Vše se snadno překoná
Když se ruka k ruce vine
Tak se dílo podaří
Říš Rakouská nezahyne
Sláva vlasti, Císaři!

Císaři po boku vládne
Rodem, duchem spřízněná
V kráse, která neuvadne
Císařovna vznešená
Bože račiž přízeň svoji
Habsburskému domu dát
Františkovi Josefovi
Alžbětě rač požehnat!

English translation

Bless, oh Lord,
The Emperor and our land
Grant that from our faith come his power
May he be a wise ruler
Let us protect His holy throne
Against all enemies!
The destiny of the Habsburg throne
Is the destiny of Austria.

Let us obey our duties truly
Let us protect our laws honourably
And if needed, gladly
May we bravely do battle
May we forever bear in mind
The glory of our victorious armies
Property, blood and life may we give
For our Emperor, for our land!

What was given to good people
May the soldier stand up for
By art and science strengthened
May the spirit of our lands grow
Pray God, give success
Unto our beloved land
May Thy light shine evermore
Upon Austria, our blessed land.

Let us stand together at all times
Unity gives only power
Where united powers reign
All [obstacles] are easily jumped
When a hand reaches out to another
The work meets with success
The Austrian Empire will not fall
Glory to our land, to the Emperor!

By the Emperor’s side
Made successful by spirit and house
In beauty, which doesn’t fade
Reigns the Exalted Empress
God, pray grant Thy favour
Upon the House of Habsburg
Francis Joseph [and]
Elisabeth, pray bless!

== Croatian ==
Kraljevka (also called Carevka), text by Petar Preradović.

Croatian original

Bože živi, Bože štiti
Kralja našeg i naš dom.
Vječnom Ti ih slavom kiti,
Snagom Ti ih jačaj svom.
Ti nam sretne dane množi,
Habsburškoj ih kući daj,
S njenom snagom zauvijek složi
Hrvatske nam krune sjaj.

Ti u našim stvori grud'ma
Živi ponos, krotku ćud,
Da smo mili svijem ljud'ma,
Na poštenju prvi svud.
Ti nas krijepi svojom vjerom,
Ravnaj naše sreće brod,
Da nam pođe pravim smjerom
Sav naš složan mili rod.

No kad domu zlo zaprijeti,
"U boj!" zovne Kraljev glas,
Tad na ovaj poziv sveti
Lavom budi svaki nas,
Da pred stijegom našim gine
Dušman svaki, Bože daj!
A nad nama s nova sine
Blagog mira vedri sjaj!

Bože živi, srećom zlati
Kraljevski nam sjajni dom,
Naša ljubav nek ga prati
Do kraj međa žiću tom;
Blago, život Kralju svome
Svaki od nas rado daj,
Vječan bud' na svijetu tome
Slavne naše krune sjaj.

English translation

God save, God protect
Our King and our Homeland.
With Eternal glory You adorn them,
With your force You strengthen them,
Joyful days You multiply,
And to the House of Habsburg grant them,
With its power may for ever bound
The splendor of the Croatian Crown.

You created us in our hearts
Live pride, meek temper,
That we are kind to all people,
In honesty, first everywhere.
You strengthen us with your faith,
Steer the ship of our happiness,
To take us in the right direction
All our harmonious kindred.

But when evil threatens the home,
"To battle!" the King's voice calls,
Then on this call the saint
Let each of us be a lion,
To die before our flag
Every enemy, God forbid!
A new son is upon us
Good peace bright shine!

God lives, good luck to you
Our royal splendid home,
May our love follow him
To the end of the border I will live that;
Bless, life to your King
Each of us is happy to give,
Eternal life in that world
Our glorious crowns shine.

== Polish ==
Hymn Ludowy

Polish original

Boże wspieraj, Boże ochroń
Nam Cesarza i nasz kraj,
Tarczą wiary rządy osłoń,
Państwu Jego siłę daj.
Brońmy wiernie Jego tronu,
Zwróćmy wszelki wroga cios,
Bo z Habsburgów tronem złączon
Jest na wieki Austrii los.

Obowiązkom swoim wierni
Strzeżmy pilnie świętych praw
W ich obronie niech się spełni
powołanie do cnych spraw!
Pomni, jak to skroń żołnierza
Świetnie zdobi lauru krzew
Nieśmy chętnie za Monarchę,
Za Ojczyznę mienie, krew!

Ludu pilnej pracy zbiory
Niech osłania zbrojna moc
Niechaj kwitną ducha twory
Niech rozświetla światło noc!
Austrii Boże daj wsławienie
Na szczyt chwały racz ją wznieść
Słońca swego skłoń promienie
Ku jej chwale, na jej cześć!

Spólność, jedność powołania,
Niech przenika wszystkek lud,
Bo złączonych sił działania
Zdolne przemóc wszelki trud.
Dążąc społem ku celowi,
Chciejmy bratnio siły zlać,
Szczęść Monarsze, szczęść Krajowi,
Austria będzie wiecznie trwać!

Przy Cesarzu mile włada
Cesarzowa pełna łask,
Cały lud Jej hołdy składa,
Podziwiając cnót Jej blask.
Franciszkowi Józefowi
I Elżbiecie, Boże szczęść,
Habsburskiemu szczęść Domowi;
Sława Jemu, chwała, cześć!

English translation

God, support, God, protect
The Emperor for us, and our land,
Shield His reign with the shield of faith,
Give strength to His country.
Let us defend His throne faithfully,
Let us reverse every strike of enemy,
Because to the Habsburg's throne is bound
For ages the fate of Austria.

== Slovene ==
Cesarska pesem

Slovene original

Bog ohrani, Bog obvari
Nam cesarja, Avstrijo!
Modro da nam gospodari
S svete vere pomočjo.
Branimo mu krono dedno
Zoper vse sovražnike;
S habsburškim bo tronom vedno
Sreča trdna Avstrije.

Za dolžnost in za pravico
Vsak pošteno, zvesto stoj;
Če bo treba, pa desnico
S srčnim upom dvigni v boj!
Naša vojska iz viharja
Prišla še brez slave ni:
Vse za dom in za cesarja,
Za cesarja blago, kri!

Meč vojščaka naj varuje,
Kar si pridnost zadobi;
Bistri duh pa premaguje
Z umetnijo, znanostmi!
Slava naj deželi klije,
Blagor bod' pri nas doma:
Vsa, kar solnce se obsije,
Cveti mirna Avstrija!

Trdno dajmo se skleniti:
Sloga pravo moč rodi;
Vse lahko nam bo storiti,
Tako združimo moči.
Brate vode vez edina
Nas do cilja enega:
Živi cesar, domovina,
Večna bode Avstrija!

In s cesarjem zaročnica,
Ene misli in krvi,
Vlada milo cesarica,
Polna dušne žlahtnosti.
Kar se more v srečo šteti,
Večni Bog naj podeli:
Franc Jožefu, Lizabeti,
Celi hiši Habsburški!

English translation

missing

== Romanian ==
Doamne ține și protege (Andrei Mureșanu version)

Romanian original

Doamne ține și protege,
Patria și pe Împărat,
Ca umbrit de Sfânta Lege,
Să ne reagă luminat,
Strămoșeasca lui cunună,
De dușmani s-o apărăm,
De-a Habsburgei 'nalte throane,
Soarta țărei s-o legăm!

Pentru drept și datorință,
S-avem simț bun și curat,
Și cerând o trebuință,
A ne bate pentru Stat,
Să pășim cu energie,
Oferind sânge și stări,
Pentru-a noastră 'mpărăție,
Pentru-a Patriei ușurări!

Cetățeanul blând să-și strângă,
Din silinț-al său venit,
Arta și știința 'nvingă,
Apărate de spirit,
Verse ceriul dar spre țară,
Si cu daruri și măriri,
Ca ș-un soare primăvară,
Viei țării fericiri!

Toți să fim întru simțire,
Toți la un scop alergând,
Dulcea Patriei fericire,
De 'mpreună 'naintând,
Toți din inimă frățească,
Să dorim neîncetat,
țara noastră să 'nflorească,
Sub Augustul Împărat!

English translation

Lord, preserve and protect
The Fatherland and the Emperor,
So that, shadowed by Holy Law,
He may govern us in enlightenment,
His ancestral crown,
Let us defend from foes,
To the high thrones of Habsburgs,
Let us tie the land's destiny!

For justice and obligation,
May we have a sound and clean conscience,
And should the need arise,
Let us fight for the State,
Let us step with energy,
Offering blood and wealth,
For our Empire,
For the Fatherland's betterment!

Let the gentle citizen collect,
By his diligence, his income,
May art and science triumph,
Defended by spirit,
May the sky pour gifts upon the country,
And alongside boons and honours,
Like a springtime sun,
May bliss be brought to the country!

Let us all be of one feeling,
All striving towards one goal,
The sweet Fatherland's happiness,
To bring forth collectively,
All, from a brotherly heart,
Let us wish unceasingly,
May our land blossom,
Under the August Emperor!

== Banat Romanian dialect ==
Romanian original

Doamne sânte, întăreșce
Pră al nostru Împărat!
Să domnească ’nţelepţeșce
Pe dreptate răzimat!
Părintescule-i coroane
Credincios să-i aperăm:
De-a Habsburgei ’nalte troane
Soartea noastră s-o legăm!

English translation

Holy Lord, defend
Our Emperor!
He shall reign wisely
Always supporting justice!
His ancestor's crown
We shall defend it with faith:
To the Habsburg's Great Thrones
Our fate shall be united with!

== Italian ==
Inno patriottico or Inno popolare

Italian original

Serbi Dio l'austriaco regno
Guardi il nostro imperator!
Nella fé che gli è sostegno
Regga noi con saggio amor
Difendiamo il serto avito
Che gli adorna il regio crin
Sempre d'Austria il soglio unito
Sia d'Asburgo col destin.

Pia difesa e forte insieme
Siamo al dritto ed al dover;
E corriam con lieta speme
La battaglia a sostener!
Rammentando le ferite
Che di lauri ci coprir;
Noi daremo beni e vite
Alla patria, al nostro Sir.

Dell'industria a' bei tesori
Sia tutela il buon guerrier;
Incruenti e miti allori
Abbian l'arti ed il saper!
Benedica il Cielo e renda
Glorioso il patrio suol,
E pacifico risplenda
Sovra l'Austria ognora il sol!

Siam concordi, in forze unite
Del potere il nerbo sta;
Alte imprese fian compite,
Se concordia in noi sarà.
Siam fratelli, e un sol pensiero
Ne congiunga e un solo cor;
Duri eterno questo Impero,
Salvi Iddio l'Imperator!

Presso a Lui sposa beata
Del suo cor l'Eletta sta
Di quei vezzi inghirlandata
Che non temono l' età.
Sulla Mite in trono assisa
Versi il Cielo ogni suo don
Salve Augusto salve Elisa
E d' Asburgo la Magion!

English translation

God keep the reign of Austria,
And keep our emperor!
In the faith that is his support
May he rule us with wise love.
Let us defend the ancestral garland
That adorns his royal hair.
May the united throne of Austria
Always be with the fate of Habsburg.

Let us be together a pious and strong defense
Of right and duty;
And let us with happy hope run
To sustain the battle!
Remembering the wounds
That covered us with laurels;
We will give possessions and lives
To country and lord.

To the beautiful treasures of industry
May the good warrior be guardian;
May skills and learning
Have bloodless and gentle triumphs!
May Heaven bless and make
Glorious our country's ground,
And may the sun always shine peacefully
Over Austria!

Let us be in agreement; in united strength
Is the core of power;
Old undertakings will be completed
If there is concord among us.
Let us be brothers, and may one thought
And one heart join us;
May this Empire last eternally,
God save the Emperor!

== Ukrainian (Ruthenian) ==
According to 19th century Western Ukrainian orthography, with current official Latin transliteration. Народний гімн

Ukrainian original

Боже, буди покровитель
Цісарю, його краям!
Кріпкий вірою правитель,
Мудро най проводить нам!
Прадідну його корону
Боронім від ворога,
Тісно із Габсбургів троном
Сплелась Австрії судьба!

Чесно, вірно, право, щиро,
Довжність, правду бережім,
А в потребі з кріпков віров
Бодрим духом в бій ідім!
Пам'ятні на воїнів славу,
Що красить їх хоругов,
За цісаря, за державу
Жертвуймо майно і кров!

Що народу склали руки,
Воїнів меч най стереже;
Світло правди і науки
Темноту най розжене!
Щедро най на край спливає
Щастя разом зі славою,
Миром сонце най сіяє
На щасливу Австрію!

Разом кріпко ся держімо,
Згодов сильний буде люд;
Разом сили сполучімо,
Двигнем і найтяжчий труд.
Згідні, єдні в спільній справі,
Ціль най буде всім одна:
Щасть цісарю, щасть державі,
Ввік постоїть Австрія!

При цісарю трон засіла,
Серцем, кровію рідня,
Цісарева наша мила,
В невъялу красу стрійна!
Що найвищим щастям світу,
Дай їм, Боже, з небеси!
Франца Йосифа, Єлизавету,
Весь Габсбурзький дім спаси!

Ukrainian transliteration

Bože, budy pokrovytel'
Cisaryu, Ieho krayam!
Kripkyj viroyu pravytel',
Mudro naj provodyt' nam!
Pradidnu Ieho koronu
Boronim vid voroha,
Tisno iz Habsburġiv tronom
Splelas' Avstryi sud'ba!

English translation

God, be the protector
for the Emperor and His lands!
A ruler strong with faith,
May he lead us wisely!
His crown of great-grandfathers,
Let us defend from the enemy,
Tightly to the Habsburg's throne
The fate of Austria has been bound!

== Friulian (dialect of Gorizia) ==
Chiant popolar
Dio mantegni d'Austria il Regno,
Uardi il nostri Imperatòr!
Nela fede – a Lui sostegno –
Nus guviarni cun amòr.
Difindìn chel diadema
Che la front circonda al GRAND
Ciarz, che l'Austria no trema
Sin che Absburgo le al command.

Cun pietàt a fuarza unida
Sostignìn lis lez del Stat;
Sei speranza nostra guida
Quand che il nostri braz combàt.
Sì! – pensand ala vitoria
Che nus spieta – vulintir
Bens e vita par la gloria
Ualìn dà del nostri Sir!

Del'industria al'opulenza
Sein tutela i boins soldàz
E i mistirs, lis arz, la scienza
Sein d'aloro coronàz.
Benedis, o Cil! la tiara
Che noaltris abitìn,
E, o soreli! tu risclara
Simpri d'Austria il faust destin.

La concordia nus unissi
Che la fuarza ja in ta man
Grandis chiossis van compissi
Se d'acordo dug saràn.
Fradis siin e atòr a un perno
Zirin ment e nostri amòr;
Duri chist biel Regno eterno:
Salvi Dio l'Imperatòr!

== Serbian ==
Народна химна/Narodna himna

Serbian original (Ćirilica)

Боже, живи, чувай, Боже,
Цара нашегъ и нашъ домъ!
Силанъ вѣромъ да насъ може
Мудромъ владат' десницомъ!
Штитимо Му царство давно
Одъ навале свачіє:
Съ хабсбурскомъ є кућомъ славно
Кобь споєна Аустрiє.

Свѣстно, вѣрно и поштено
Правду, дужность бранимо,
А кадъ треба, тад' храбрено
На оружѣ скочимо!
Знаюћ' како слава стара
Войску кити лaворомъ,—
Благо, животъ, све за Цара,
Све за Цара и за домъ!

Што грађанинъ съ мукомъ стече,
Тому войникъ буди штитъ;
Уме ине некʼ претече
Умъ нашъ духомъ поноситъ!
Срећа, слава некʼ извиру
Свудъ по земляʼ нашiє:
Сунце божє некʼ у миру
Сʼя врхъ срећне Аустрiє!

Силе наше некʼ се сложе
Свемогућанъ єръ є складь;
И найтежiй ласно може
Надвладат' се слогомъ рáдъ.
Къ єдной цѣли погодльиви
Сви настоймо братски ит';
Царь да живи, домъ да живи:
Аустрiя ће вѣчна быт'!

Узъ нашега влада Цара
Крвлю, срдцемъ родица,
Вѣковитогъ пуна чара
Мила наша Царица.
Сваку срећу, сваку славу
Излiй, Боже, ти надъ Ньомъ:
Францъ-Iосифа, Єлисаву,
Васъ Хабсбурскiй живи домъ!

Serbian original (Gajica)

Bože, živi, čuvaj, Bože,
Cara našeg i naš dom!
Silan verom da nas može
Mudrom vladat' desnicom!
Štitimo Mu carstvo davno
Od navale svačije:
S habsburskom je kućom slavno
Kob spojena Austrije.

Svestno verno i pošteno
Pravdu, dužnost branimo,
A kad treba, tad hrabreno
Na oružje skočimo!
Znajuć kako slava stara
Vojsku kiti lovorom,—
Blago, život, sve za Cara,
Sve za Cara i za dom!

Što građanik s mukom steče,
Tomu vojnik budi štit;
Ume ine nek preteče
Um naš duhom ponosit!
Sreća, slaca nek izviru
Svud po zemlja našije':
Sunce božje nek u miru
Sja vrh srećne Austrije!

Sile naše nek se slože
Svemogućan jer je sklad;
I najteži lasno može
Nadvladat' se slogom rad.
K jednoj celi pogodljivi
Svi nastojmo bratski it';
Cara da živi, dom da živi:
Austrija će večna bit'!

Uz našega vlada Cara
Krvlju, srcem rodica,
Vekovitog puna čara
Mila naša Carica.
Svaku sreću, svaku slavu
Izlij, Bože, ti nad Njom:
Franc-Josifa, Jelisavu,
Vas habsburski živi dom!

English translation

God, live, save, God,
Our king and our home!
He is strong in faith that he can do us
Wise to rule with the right!
We protect His kingdom long ago
From the attack of anyone:
With the Habsburg family, the house is famous
The fate is connected to Austria.

What a citizen earns with difficulty,
To him the soldier be a shield;
He knows how some run
Our mind is proud of our spirit!
Happiness and glory do not spring
Everywhere in our country:
God's sun rest in peace
All the best, happy Austria!
