= Deutschösterreich, du herrliches Land =

1920–1929 de facto national anthem of Austria

English: German-Austria, Thou Wonderful Land
- Former de facto national anthem of Austria
- Also known as: „Österreich, du herrliches Land“ (English: 'Austria, Thou Wonderful Land')
- Lyrics: Karl Renner
- Music: Wilhelm Kienzl
- Adopted: 1920
- Relinquished: 1929
- Succeeded by: "Österreichische Bundeshymne"

Audio sample
- Digital instrumental rendition in F major: file; help

"Deutschösterreich, du herrliches Land" (Note: German pronunciation: [ˈdɔɪtʃˌʔøːstɐʁaɪç | duː ˈhɛɐ̯lɪçəs ˈlant]; lit. 'German-Austria, Thou Wonderful Land') was the de facto national anthem of Austria, used from 1920 to 1929. Its lyrics were written by Chancellor Karl Renner in 1920, while the melody was composed by Wilhelm Kienzl.

The Republic of German-Austria was formed in 1918 as the successor to the multinational Austro-Hungarian Empire in its predominantly German speaking part. The government and population was much in favour of a unification with Germany, the German nation-state that had been formed in 1871 but had excluded Austria. However, the victors of World War I demanded that Austria remained a separate country. In the Treaty of Versailles, there was a prohibition of unification. Under the provisions of the Treaty of Saint-Germain-en-Laye (1919), German Austria had to change its name to simply Austria.

== Lyrics ==
German original

Deutschösterreich, du herrliches Land, wir lieben dich!
Hoch von der Alm unterm Gletscherdom
Stürzen die Wasser zum Donaustrom,
Tränken im Hochland Hirten und Lämmer,
Treiben am Absturz Mühlen und Hämmer,
Grüßen viel Dörfer, viel Städte und ziehn
Jauchzend zum Ziel, unserm einzigen Wien!
Du herrliches Land, unser Heimatland,
Wir lieben dich, wir schirmen dich.

Deutschösterreich, du tüchtiges Volk, wir lieben dich!
Hart ist dein Boden und karg dein Brot,
Stark doch macht dich und klug die Not.
Seelen, die gleich wie Berge beständig,
Sinne, die gleich wie Wasser lebendig,
Herzen so sonnig, mitteilsamer Gunst,
Schaffen sich selber ihr Glück, ihre Kunst.
Du tüchtiges Volk, unser Muttervolk,
Wir lieben dich, wir schirmen dich.

Deutschösterreich, du treusinnig Volk, wir lieben dich!
Dienende Treu schuf dir Not und Reu,
Sei uns in Freiheit dir selber treu!
Gibt es ein Schlachtfeld rings in den Reichen,
Wo deiner Söhne Knochen nicht bleichen?
Endlich brachst du die Ketten entzwei,
Diene dir selber, sei dein! Sei frei!
Du treusinnig Volk, unser Duldervolk,
Wir lieben dich, wir schirmen dich.

Deutschösterreich, du Bergländerbund, wir lieben dich!
Frei durch die Tat und vereint durch Wahl,
Eins durch Geschick und durch Blut zumal.
Einig auf ewig, Ostalpenlande!
Treu unserm Volkstum, treu dem Verbande!
Friede dem Freund, doch dem Feinde, der droht,
Wehrhaften Trotz in Kampf und Not!
Du Bergländerbund, unser Ostalpenbund,
Wir lieben dich, wir schirmen dich.

English translation

German-Austria, thou wonderful land, thee we adore!
High from the Alm under the glacier dome,
The waters rush to the Danube River,
They water in the highlands the shepherds and lambs,
They drive with a crash the mills and hammers,
They greet many villages, many towns, and run
Joyously towards their aim, our unique Vienna!
Thou wonderful land, our homeland,
Thee we adore, thee we'll protect.

German-Austria, thou doughty people, thee we adore!
Hard is thy soil and meagre thy bread,
But hardship maketh thee strong and smart.
Souls like as mountains constant,
Senses like as water lively,
Hearts so sunny, full of benevolence,
Create themselves their own happiness and art.
Thou doughty people, our motherly people,
Thee we adore, thee we'll protect.

German-Austria, thou faithful people, thee we adore!
Thy loyal service hath brought thee hardship and remorse,
Be to us in freedom, true to thyself!
Is there any battlefield in the nations around
Where the bones of thy sons bleach not?
Finally, thou hast broken thy chains in twain,
Serve thyself, only thee! Be free!
Thou faithful people, our enduring people,
Thee we adore, thee we'll protect.

German-Austria, thou league of mountain lands, thee we adore!
Free through deed and united by choice,
One in fate and especially in blood.
Forever united, the East Alpine Lands!
True to our nation and true to the union!
Peace to our friends, but to foes that threaten
Defensive defiance in battle and hardship!
Thou league of mountain lands, our East Alpine League,
Thee we adore, thee we'll protect.

== See also ==
- "Sei gesegnet ohne Ende"
- "Deutschlandlied"
