= National anthem of Austria (1929–1938) =

Österreichische Bundeshymne
English: Austrian National Anthem
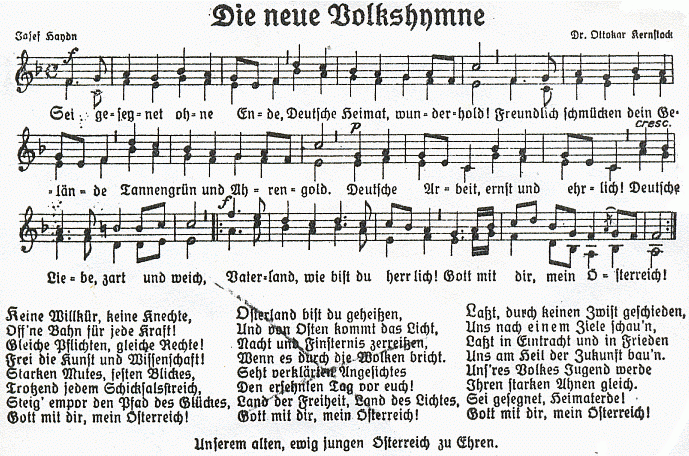
- Former national anthem of Austria
- Also known as: "Kernstock-Hymne" (English: Kernstock Anthem) "Sei gesegnet ohne Ende" (English: Be Blessed Without End)
- Lyrics: Ottokar Kernstock, 1920
- Music: Joseph Haydn, 1797
- Adopted: 1929
- Relinquished: 1938
- Preceded by: "Deutschösterreich, du herrliches Land"
- Succeeded by: "Deutschlandlied" and "Horst-Wessel-Lied" (as part of Germany); "Bundeshymne der Republik Österreich" (as independent Austria)

Audio sample
- 1930s rendition by the Polydor-Blasorchester, conducted by Josef Snaga: file; help

The "Österreichische Bundeshymne" (English: Austrian National Anthem, lit. 'Austrian Federal Hymn'), also known by its incipit "Sei gesegnet ohne Ende" (German pronunciation: [zaɪ̯ ɡəˈzeːɡnət ˈʔoːnə ˈʔɛndə]; lit. 'Be Blessed Without End'), and the "Kernstock-Hymne" (English: Kernstock Anthem, lit. 'Kernstock Hymn'), is a German language song that was used as the national anthem of Austria from 1929 until 1938. Written by Ottokar Kernstock, it was sung to the famous tune of the imperial Austrian anthem, "Gott erhalte Franz den Kaiser" by Joseph Haydn, later known as the tune of the "Deutschlandlied", which since 1922 has been the national anthem of Germany (and formerly West Germany).

== History ==
1930s performance by the Wiener Symphonie-Orchester, conducted by Oswald Kabasta.

Performance by the Wiener Männergesang-Verein, conducted by Karl Luze.

The first (but unofficial) national anthem of the First Austrian Republic was "Deutschösterreich, du herrliches Land" (English: "German-Austria, Thou Glorious Land"). Written in 1920 by Karl Renner and set to music by Wilhelm Kienzl, the patriotic song was not able to successfully compete against the former imperial anthem and especially the latter's famous tune by Joseph Haydn.

In 1929, a new national anthem was introduced that was sung to this popular tune and whose text stemmed from Ottokar Kernstock, who had written it in 1920. The third verse of the poem was, however, excluded from the official status as national anthem. The song remained in use in both the Austrian First Republic and the Federal State of Austria but became obsolete in 1938, when Austria joined Germany.

It was not the only proposal for a new Austrian national anthem. Anton Wildgans asked Richard Strauss to set one of his poems, "Österreichisches Lied" ('Austrian Song'), to music. Although Strauss did so, the music to the poem did not become popular. Here are some excerpts of the poem:

Wo sich der ewige Schnee
Spiegelt im Alpensee,
Sturzbach am Fels zerstäubt, […]
Österreich heißt das Land!
Da er’s mit gnädiger Hand
Schuf, und so reichbegabt,
Gott hat es liebgehabt!

Translation:

Where the eternal snow
Reflects in the alpine lake,
Where the torrent nebulizes at a rock, […]
This land is called Austria!
As He created it with a gracious
Hand, and so gifted,
God dearly loved it!

The introduction of the "Kernstockhymne" actually led to confusion, as everyone sang different lyrics to the same tune, depending on their political standpoints. The school council of Vienna decreed that people should sing the "Deutschlandlied", the Ministry of Education demanded for everyone to sing the "Kernstockhymne". Consequently, people sang the anthem that fitted their personal political views: the former imperial anthem, the "Kernstockhymne", or the "Deutschlandlied", which often led to dissonance when the national anthem was sung publicly.

From 1936 onward, it had become customary among Austrians to also sing the "Lied der Jugend" as part of the national anthem, thus honoring the murdered chancellor Engelbert Dollfuß.

As the "Kernstockhymne" had never gained popularity, no attempt was made to reinstate it as the national anthem after World War II.

== Lyrics ==
Sei gesegnet ohne Ende,
Heimaterde wunderhold!
Freundlich schmücken dein Gelände
Tannengrün und Ährengold.
Deutsche Arbeit, ernst und ehrlich,
Deutsche Liebe, zart und weich,
Vaterland, wie bist du herrlich,
Gott mit dir, mein Österreich!

Keine Willkür, keine Knechte,
Off′ne Bahn für jede Kraft!
Gleiche Pflichten, gleiche Rechte,
Frei die Kunst und Wissenschaft!
Starken Mutes, festen Blickes,
Trotzend jedem Schicksalsstreich
Steig empor den Pfad des Glückes,
Gott mit dir, mein Österreich!

Laßt, durch keinen Zwist geschieden,
Uns nach einem Ziele schau'n,
Laßt in Eintracht und in Frieden
Uns am Heil der Zukunft bau'n!
Uns'res Volkes starke Jugend
Werde ihren Ahnen gleich,
Sei gesegnet, Heimaterde,
Gott mit dir, mein Österreich!

Translation:

Be blessed without end,
Wonderful native land!
Green firs and golden spikes
Friendly adorn thy lands.
German labour, earnest and honest,
German love, tender and soft,
Fatherland, how marvelous thou art,
God with thee, my Austria!

No tyranny, no serfs,
Open way for every force!
Equal duties, equal rights,
Free art and science!
Strong bravery, firm look,
Despite every stroke of fate
Rise along the path of happiness,
God with thee, my Austria!

Let us look at one goal
Through no discord divided.
Let us build on the boon of future
In concord and in peace!
The strong youth of our people
Becometh like its forefathers,
Be thou blessed, native land,
God with thee, my Austria!

== See also ==
- List of historical national anthems
- "Dem Vaterland"
