= Kaiserquartett =

1797 string quartet by Joseph Haydn

The Kaiserquartett (Hob. III:77, Op. 76, No. 3, English: Emperor Quartet), is a string quartet in C major by Joseph Haydn.

The Kaiserquartett is the third of the six String Quartets, Op. 76, which Haydn composed in 1797 at the age of 65 after his return from London and dedicated to Count Erdődy. They were published in 1799. It was nicknamed the Kaiserquartett because its second movement contains four cantus firmus variations on the theme of the "Volkslied" previously composed by Haydn (according to the first edition of 1797) "Gott erhalte Franz den Kaiser", written for Francis II.

Some 40 years later, August Heinrich Hoffmann von Fallersleben wrote his "Deutschlandlied" (Das Lied der Deutschen) on the then British island Heligoland to Haydn's, an Austrian, famous and popular melody, the third verse of which today is the text of the national anthem of Germany.

== Movements ==
The string quartet has four movements:

1. Allegro (C major, sonata form)
  The musicologist László Somfai suggested in 1986 that the opening notes have an extra-musical origin: they represent the initial letters of "Gott erhalte Franz den Caesar", assuming the license of using the original Latin spelling for "Kaiser" ("K" does not designate a musical note).
2. Poco Adagio. Cantabile – Variations I–IV (G major, strophic variations)
3. Menuetto. Allegro (C major, A minor)
4. Finale. Presto (C minor, E♭ major, C major, sonata form)
