= Gott erhalte Franz den Kaiser =

Anthem of the Austrian monarchy

English: God Save Francis the Emperor
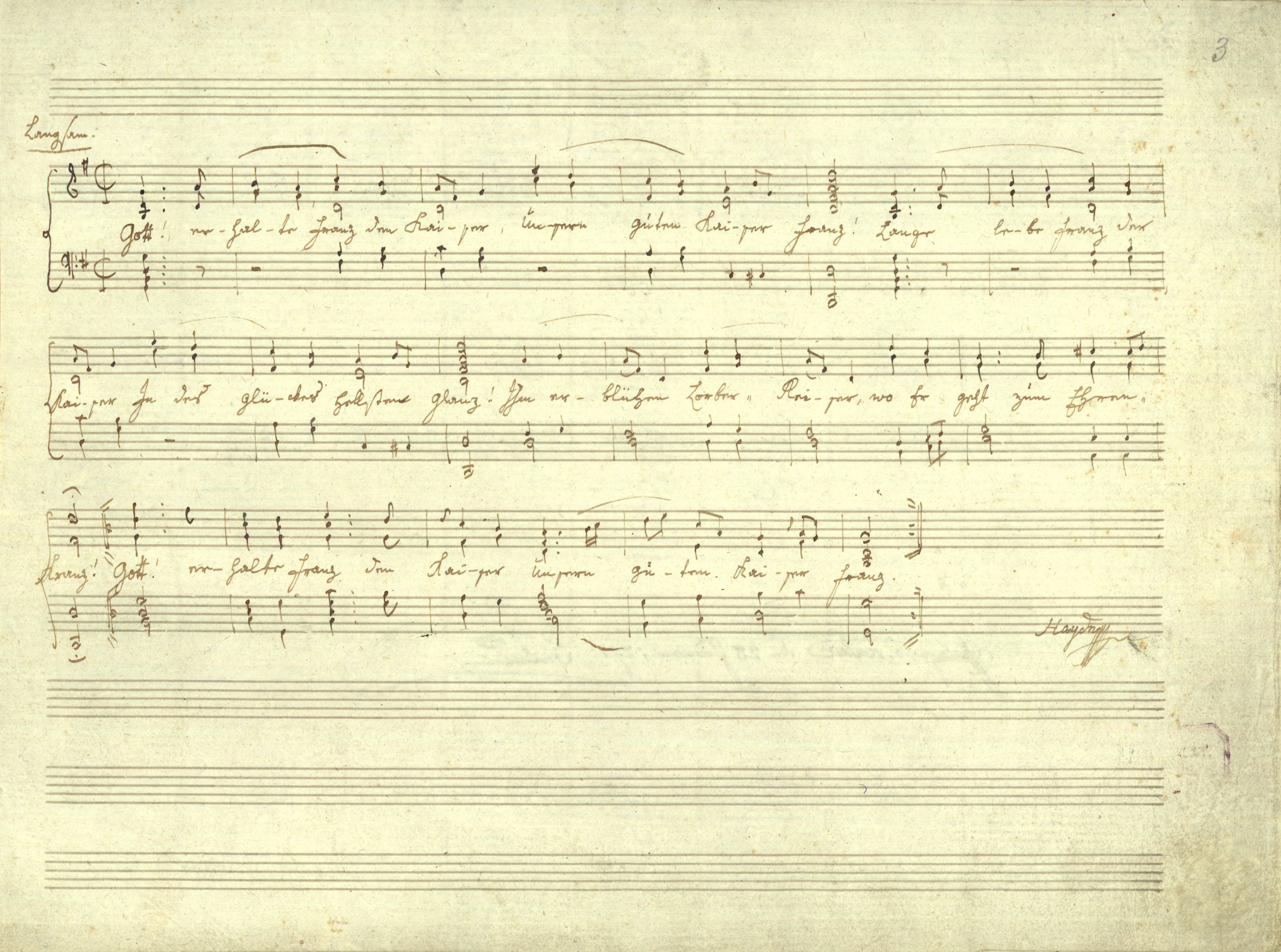
- Autograph score of the original version
- Lyrics: Lorenz Leopold Haschka
- Music: Joseph Haydn, 1797

Audio sample
- Vocal rendition of the anthem, 1910s recording: file; help

"Gott erhalte Franz den Kaiser" (Note: German pronunciation: [ˈɡɔt ɛʁˈhaltə ˈfʁants dən ˈkaɪzɐ]; lit. 'God Save Francis the Emperor') also called the "Kaiserhymne", (Note: German pronunciation: [ˈkaɪzɐˌhʏmnə]; lit. 'Emperor's Hymn') is an anthem composed in 1797 by Joseph Haydn. In its original version it was paired with lyrics by Lorenz Leopold Haschka and served as a patriotic song, expressing devotion to Francis II, Emperor of the Holy Roman Empire.

In later times, Haydn's tune came to be widely employed in other contexts, often paired with new lyrics. These later versions include works of classical music, Christian hymns, alma maters, and the national anthem of Germany.

== Lyrics and music ==
German original

Gott erhalte Franz den Kaiser, unsern guten Kaiser Franz!
Lange lebe Franz der Kaiser, in des Glückes hellstem Glanz!
Ihm erblühen Lorbeerreiser, wo er geht, zum Ehrenkranz!
Gott erhalte Franz den Kaiser, unsern guten Kaiser Franz!

English translation

God save Francis the Emperor, our good Emperor Francis!
Long live Francis the Emperor in the brightest splendour of bliss!
May laurel branches bloom for him, wherever he goes, as a wreath of honour.
God save Francis the Emperor, our good Emperor Francis!

== History ==
The song was written when Austria was seriously threatened by Revolutionary France and patriotic sentiments ran high. The story of the song's genesis was narrated in 1847 by Anton Schmid, who was Custodian of the Austrian National Library in Vienna:

In England, Haydn came to know the favourite British national anthem, 'God Save the King', and he envied the British nation for a song through which it could, at festive occasions, show in full measure its respect, love, and devotion to its ruler.

When the Father of Harmony returned to his beloved Kaiserstadt, (Note: German: 'city of the emperor'.) he related these impressions to that real friend, connoisseur, supporter and encourager of many a great and good one of Art and Science, Freiherr van Swieten, Prefect of the I. R. Court Library, who at the time was at the head of the Concert Spirituel (supported by high aristocracy) and likewise Haydn's particular patron. Haydn wished that Austria, too, could have a similar national anthem, wherein it could display a similar respect and love for its Sovereign. Also, such a song could be used in the fight then taking place with those forcing the Rhine; it could be used in a noble way to inflame the heart of the Austrians to new heights of devotion to the princes and fatherland, and to incite to combat, and to increase, the mob of volunteer soldiers who had been collected by a general proclamation.

Freiherr van Swieten hastily took counsel with His Excellency, the then President of Lower Austria, Franz Count von Saurau ... and so there came into being a song which, apart from being one of Haydn's greatest creations, has won the crown of immortality.

It is also true that this high-principled Count used the most opportune moment to introduce a Volksgesang, (Note: German: 'people's song') and thus he called to life those beautiful thoughts which will delight connoisseurs and amateurs here and abroad.

He immediately ordered the poet Lorenz Haschka to draft the poetry and then requested our Haydn to set it to music.

In January 1797, this double task was resolved, and the first performance of the Song was ordered for the birthday of the Monarch.

Saurau himself later wrote:

I had a text fashioned by the worthy poet Haschka; and to have it set to music, I turned to our immortal compatriot Haydn, who, I felt, was the only man capable of creating something that could be placed at the side of ... "God Save the King".

"Gott erhalte Franz den Kaiser" was first performed on the Emperor's birthday, 12 February 1797. It proved popular, and came to serve unofficially as Austria's first national anthem.

== Composition ==
As elsewhere in Haydn's music, it has been conjectured that Haydn took part of his material from folk songs he knew. This hypothesis has never achieved unanimous agreement, the alternative being that Haydn's original tune was adapted by the people in various versions as folk songs. For discussion, see Haydn and folk music.

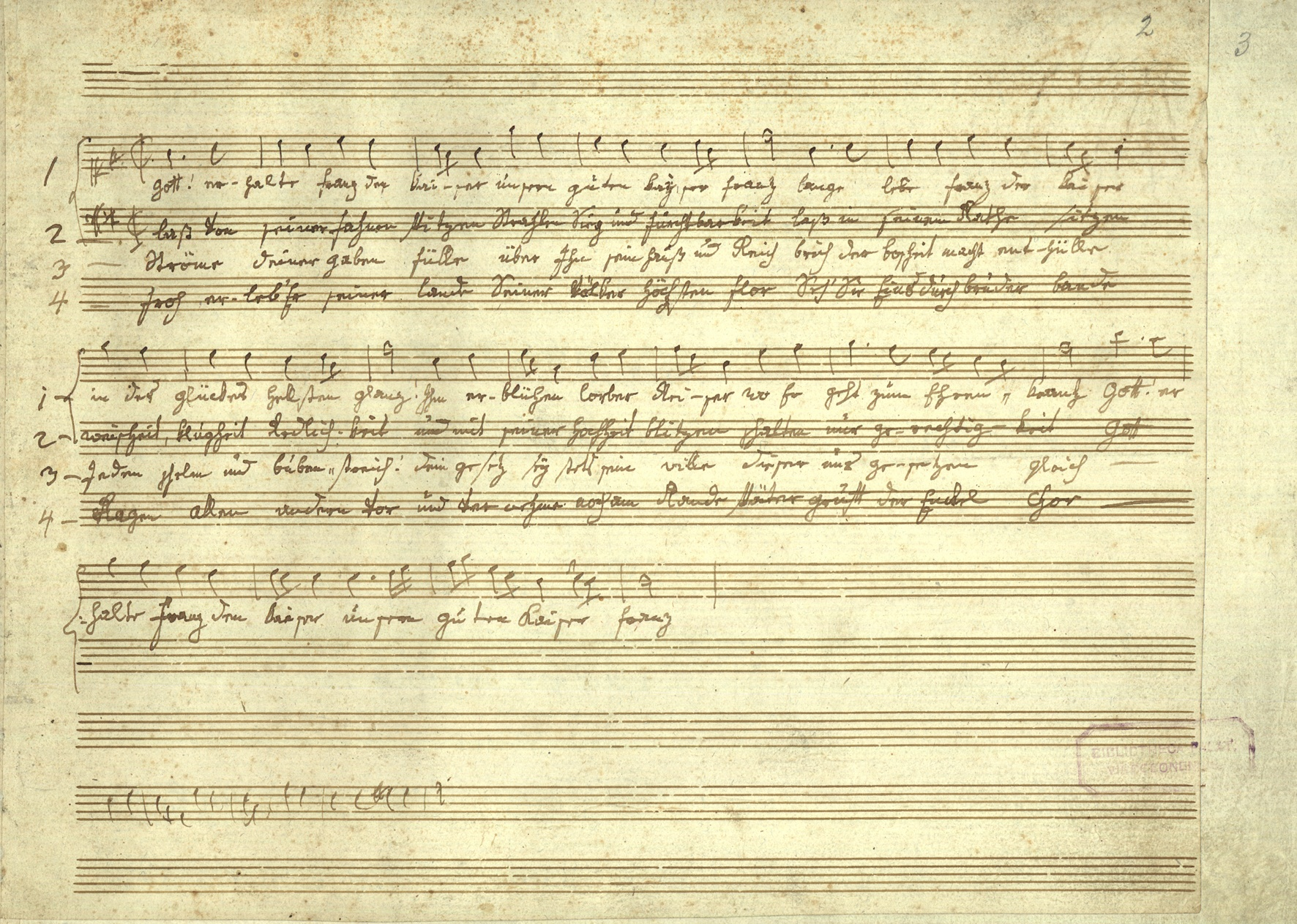
Autograph sketch of "Gott erhalte Franz den Kaiser"

Irrespective of the original source, Haydn's own compositional efforts went through multiple drafts, discussed by Rosemary Hughes in her biography of the composer. Hughes reproduces the draft fragment given below (i.e., the fifth through eighth lines of the song) and writes: "His sketches, preserved in the Vienna National Library, show the self-denial and economy with which he struggled to achieve [the song's] seemingly inevitable climax, pruning the earlier and more obviously interesting version of the fifth and sixth lines, which would have anticipated, and so lessened, its overwhelming effect."

The original version of the song (see autograph score, above) included a single line for voice with a rather crude piano accompaniment, with no dynamic indications and what David Wyn Jones calls "an unevenness of keyboard sonority". This version was printed in many copies (two different printers were assigned to the work) and sent to theatres and opera houses across the Austrian territories with instructions for performance. The Vienna premiere took place in the Burgtheater on 12 February 1797, the day the song was officially released. The Emperor was present, attending a performance of Dittersdorf's opera Doktor und Apotheker and Joseph Weigl's ballet Alonzo und Cora. The occasion celebrated his 29th birthday.

Not long after, Haydn later wrote three additional versions of his song:

Haydn's piano reduction of his Kaiserquartett

- He first wrote a version for orchestra, called "much more refined" by Jones.
- During 1797, Haydn was working on a commission for six string quartets from Count Joseph Erdödy. He conceived the idea of composing a slow movement for one of the quartets consisting of the Emperor's hymn as theme, followed by four variations, each involving the melody played by one member of the quartet. The finished quartet, now often called the "Emperor" quartet, was published as the third of the Opus 76 quartets, dedicated to Count Erdödy. It is perhaps Haydn's most famous work in this genre.
- The last version Haydn wrote was a piano reduction of the quartet movement, published by Artaria in 1799. The publisher printed it with the original cruder piano version of the theme, though a modern edition corrects this error.

== Haydn's own view of the song ==
Joseph Haydn seems to have been particularly fond of his creation. During his frail and sickly old age (1802–1809), the composer often would struggle to the piano to play his song, often with great feeling, as a form of consolation; and as his servant Johann Elssler narrated, it was the last music Haydn ever played:

The Kaiser Lied was still played three times a day, though, but on 26 May [1809] at half-past midday the Song was played for the last time and that 3 times over, with such expression and taste, well! that our good Papa was astonished about it himself and said he hadn't played the Song like that for a long time and was very pleased about it and felt well altogether till evening at 5 o'clock then our good Papa began to lament that he didn't feel well...

Elssler goes on to narrate the composer's final decline and death, which occurred on 31 May.

== Later uses of the tune in classical music ==
Later composers in the Western classical canon have repeatedly quoted or otherwise employed Haydn's tune, as is demonstrated by the following chronological list. As the tune was widely known, the uses by other composers were heard as quotations and served as an emblem of Austria, of Austrian patriotism, or of the Austrian monarchy.

- Philipp Jakob Riotte quotes the tune at the end of his battle piece Die Schlacht bei Leipzig (ca. 1814) in order to illustrate the joy after Napoleon's defeat in the Battle of Leipzig.
- Ludwig van Beethoven quotes the last four bars in "Es ist vollbracht", WoO 97, the finale of Georg Friedrich Treitschke's singspiel Die Ehrenpforten (1815). The work celebrates the end of the Napoleonic Wars, essentially the same conflict that gave rise to Haydn's original hymn. It is seldom performed today.
- Carl Czerny wrote Variations on "Gott erhalte Franz den Kaiser" for piano and orchestra or piano and string quartet, his Op. 73 (1824).
- Gioachino Rossini used the tune in the banquet scene of his 1825 opera Il viaggio a Reims for the German Baron Trombonok.
- Niccolò Paganini wrote a set of variations on this tune for violin and orchestra in 1828, under the title Maestosa Sonata Sentimentale.
- Gaetano Donizetti used the tune in his opera Maria Stuarda (1835), at act 3, scene 8, "Deh! Tu di un'umile preghiera ..."
- Clara Schumann used the tune as the basis for her "Souvenir de Vienne", Op. 9 (1838) for solo piano.
- Bedřich Smetana used the tune in his Festive Symphony (1853), which the composer intended to dedicate to the Emperor Franz Joseph I of Austria.
- Henryk Wieniawski wrote a set of variations on the tune for unaccompanied violin (Variations on the Austrian National Anthem, from L'école Moderne, Op. 10; 1853).
- John Knowles Paine wrote a set of concert variations on this tune for organ as his Op. 3 (1860) .
- Pyotr Ilyich Tchaikovsky arranged the work for orchestra in 1874, apparently in connection with a visit to Russia by the Austrian Emperor. The arrangement was published only in 1970.
- Anton Bruckner wrote his Improvisationskizze Ischl 1890 to be played on the organ during the wedding of Archduchess Marie Valerie of Austria.
- Béla Bartók employed the theme in his symphonic poem Kossuth (1903); in this patriotic work about the failed Hungarian Revolution of 1848 the theme serves as an emblem for the Austrian enemy.
- Erwin Schulhoff in "Symphonia Germanica" (1919)

== Use in national anthems, alma maters, and hymns ==
=== Austria-Hungary ===
Kaiserhymne
English: Emperor's Hymn
- Imperial anthem of the Habsburg monarchy
- Also known as: Gott erhalte, Gott beschütze (English: God preserve, God protect); Volkshymne (English: People's Hymn)
- Lyrics: Johann Gabriel Seidl, 1854
- Music: Joseph Haydn, 1797
- Adopted: 1854 (as Austria); 1867 (as Austria-Hungary)
- Relinquished: 1918
- Succeeded by: "Deutschösterreich, du herrliches Land" (Austria) "Himnusz" (Hungary)

After the death of Francis in 1835, the tune was given new lyrics that praised his successor, Ferdinand: "Segen Öst'reichs hohem Sohne / Unserm Kaiser Ferdinand!" ("Blessings to Austria's high son / Our Emperor Ferdinand!"). After Ferdinand's abdication in 1848, the original lyrics were used again because his successor (Francis Joseph) was also named Francis. However, in 1854, yet again new lyrics were selected: "Gott erhalte, Gott beschütze / Unsern Kaiser, unser Land!" ("God preserve, God protect / Our Emperor, our country!").

There were versions of the hymn in several languages of the Austro-Hungarian Empire (e.g., Czech, Croatian, Slovene, Hungarian, Ukrainian, Polish, Italian).

At the end of the First World War in 1918, the Austro-Hungarian Empire was abolished and divided into multiple states, one of them being the residual state of Austria. The new state had deposed its old Emperor and become a republic. According to Proksch, "in 1920 the Austrian government moved to replace Haydn's "Kaiserhymne" with a new national anthem. Prompted by a desire to promote the new Austrian Republic as opposed to the defeated and disbanded Habsburg Empire, Austria literally discarded a significant part of its national identity." The tune thus ceased to be used for official purposes. When the last Emperor, Charles I, died in 1922, monarchists created an original stanza for his son Otto von Habsburg; but since the emperor was never restored, this version never attained official standing.

The hymn was revived in 1929 with completely new lyrics, known as "Sei gesegnet ohne Ende", which remained the national anthem of Austria until the Anschluss, which terminated the Austrian state for the period 1938-1945. With older lyrics the hymn retained its associations with the deposed Habsburg dynasty; thus the first stanza of the 1854 version was sung in 1989 during the funeral of Empress Zita of Austria and again in 2011 during the funeral of her son Otto von Habsburg.

=== Germany ===
Long after Haydn's death, his melody was used as the tune for Hoffmann von Fallersleben's poem Das Lied der Deutschen (1841). The third stanza (which begins with "Einigkeit und Recht und Freiheit") is sung to the same melody, and is presently the national anthem of Germany.

=== Hymns ===
In the ordinary nomenclature of hymn tunes, the melody of "Gott erhalte Franz den Kaiser" is classified as 87.87D trochaic metre. When employed in a hymn it is sometimes known as "Austria", or "Austrian Hymn". It has been paired with various lyrics.

- Lyrics by John Newton which begin "Glorious Things of Thee Are Spoken/Zion, city of our God"
- Lyrics by Samuel Longfellow which begin "Light of ages and of nations"
- Lyrics by an unknown author which begin "Praise the Lord, Ye Heavens Adore Him"

=== School hymns ===
- The alma mater of Columbia University, "Stand, Columbia"
- The alma mater of the University of Pittsburgh
- The alma mater of Western Reserve University (merged into Case Western Reserve University)
- The school song of Kwun Tong Government Secondary School

== Lyrics ==
In addition to the German lyrics, the song has been translated into many other languages spoken in the Holy Roman Empire.

=== Original 1797 version ===
German original

Gott erhalte Franz den Kaiser,
Unsern guten Kaiser Franz!
Lange lebe Franz, der Kaiser,
In des Glückes hellstem Glanz!
Ihm erblühen Lorbeerreiser,
Wo er geht, zum Ehrenkranz!
Gott erhalte Franz den Kaiser,
Unsern guten Kaiser Franz!

Laß von seiner Fahne Spitzen
Strahlen Sieg und Fruchtbarkeit!
Laß in seinem Rate Sitzen
Weisheit, Klugheit, Redlichkeit;
Und mit Seiner Hoheit Blitzen
Schalten nur Gerechtigkeit!
Gott erhalte Franz den Kaiser,
Unsern guten Kaiser Franz!

Ströme deiner Gaben Fülle
Über ihn, sein Haus und Reich!
Brich der Bosheit Macht, enthülle
Jeden Schelm- und Bubenstreich!
Dein Gesetz sei stets sein Wille,
Dieser uns Gesetzen gleich.
Gott erhalte Franz den Kaiser,
Unsern guten Kaiser Franz!

Froh erleb' er seiner Lande,
Seiner Völker höchsten Flor!
Seh' sie, Eins durch Bruderbande,
Ragen allen andern vor!
Und vernehm' noch an dem Rande
Später Gruft der Enkel Chor.
Gott erhalte Franz den Kaiser,
Unsern guten Kaiser Franz!

English translation

God keep Francis the Emperor,
Our good emperor Francis!
Long live Francis the emperor,
In the brightest splendour of happiness!
May sprigs of laurel bloom for him
As a garland of honour, wherever he goes.
God keep Francis the Emperor,
Our good emperor Francis!

From the tips of his flag
May victory and fruitfulness shine!
In his council
May knowledge, wisdom and honesty sit!
And with his Highness's lightning
May justice but prevail!
God keep Francis the Emperor,
Our good emperor Francis!

May the abundance of thy gifts
Pour over him, his house and Empire!
Break the power of wickedness, and reveal
Every trick of rogues and knaves!
May thy Law always be his Will,
And may this be like laws to us.
God keep Francis the Emperor,
Our good emperor Francis!

May he gladly experience the highest bloom
Of his land and of his peoples!
May he see them, united by the bonds of brothers,
Loom over all others!
And may he hear at the edge
Of his late tomb his grandchildren's chorus.
God keep Francis the Emperor,
Our good emperor Francis!

During Haydn's lifetime, his friend the musicologist Charles Burney, made an English translation of the first verse which is more poetical albeit less literal than the one given above:

God preserve the Emp'ror Francis
Sov'reign ever good and great;
Save, o save him from mischances
In Prosperity and State!
May his Laurels ever blooming
Be by Patriot Virtue fed;
May his worth the world illumine
And bring back the Sheep misled!
God preserve our Emp'ror Francis!
Sov'reign ever good and great.

Burney's penultimate couplet about sheep has no counterpart in the original German and appears to be Burney's own contribution.

=== 1854 version ===
German original

Gott erhalte, Gott beschütze
unsern Kaiser, unser Land!
Mächtig durch des Glaubens Stütze
führ' Er uns mit weiser Hand!
Laßt uns Seiner Väter Krone
schirmen wider jeden Feind;
𝄆 Innig bleibt mit Habsburgs Throne
Österreichs Geschick vereint. 𝄇

Fromm und bieder, wahr und offen
laßt für Recht und Pflicht uns stehn,
laßt, wenn's gilt, mit frohem Hoffen
muthvoll in den Kampf uns gehn!
Eingedenk der Lorbeerreiser,
die das Heer so oft sich wand,
𝄆 Gut und Blut für unsern Kaiser,
Gut und Blut für's Vaterland! 𝄇

Was der Bürger Fleiß geschaffen
schütze treu des Kriegers Kraft;
mit des Geistes heitern Waffen
siege Kunst und Wissenschaft!
Segen sei dem Land beschieden,
und sein Ruhm dem Segen gleich:
𝄆 Gottes Sonne strahl' in Frieden
auf ein glücklich Österreich! 𝄇

Laßt uns fest zusammenhalten,
In der Eintracht liegt die Macht;
Mit vereinter Kräfte Walten
Wird das Schwere leicht vollbracht,
Laßt uns Eins durch Brüderbande
Gleichem Ziel entgegengehn!
𝄆 Heil dem Kaiser, Heil dem Lande,
Österreich wird ewig stehn! 𝄇

An des Kaisers Seite waltet,
Ihm verwandt durch Stamm und Sinn,
Reich an Reiz, der nie veraltet,
Uns're holde Kaiserin.
Was als Glück zu höchst gepriesen
Ström' auf sie der Himmel aus:
𝄆 Heil Franz Josef, Heil Elisen,
Segen Habsburgs ganzem Haus! 𝄇

IPA transcription (Note: See Help:IPA/German and German phonology.)

[gɔt ɛɐˈhal.tə gɔt bəˈʃʏ.tsə |]
[ˈʊn.zɐn ˈkaɪ.zɐ ˈʊn.zɐ lant ‖]
[ˈmɛç.tɪç dʊɐç dɛs ˈglaʊ.bəns ˈʃtʏ.tsə |]
[fyːɐ eːɐ ʊns mɪt ˈvaɪ.zɐ hant ‖]
[last ʊns ˈzaɪ.nɐ ˈfɛː.tɐ ˈkʁoː.nə |]
[ˈʃɪɐ.mən ˈviː.dɐ ˈjeː.dən ˈfaɪnt ‖]
𝄆 [ˈɪ.nɪç blaɪpt mɪt ˈhapsˌbʊɐks ˈtʁoː.nə |]
[ˈøː.stɐ.ʁaɪçs gəˈʃɪk ˈfɛɐ.ʔaɪnt ‖] 𝄇}

[fʁoːm ʊnt ˈbiː.dɐ vaːɐ ʊnt ˈɔ.fn̩ |]
[last fyːɐ ʁɛçt ʊnt pflɪçt ʊns ʃteːn ‖]
[last vɛn ɛs gɪlt mɪt ˈfʁoː.əm ˈhɔ.fn̩ |]
[ˈmuːtˌfɔl ɪn deːn kampf ʊns geːn ‖]
[ˈaɪŋ.gəˌdɛŋk deːɐ ˈlɔɐˌbeːɐˈʁaɪ.sɐ |]
[diː das heːɐ zoː ɔft zɪç vant ‖]
𝄆 [guːt ʊnt bluːt fyːɐ ˈʊn.zɐn ˈkaɪ.zɐ |]
[guːt ʊnt bluːt fyːɐ ɛs ˈfaː.tɐˌlant ‖] 𝄇

[vas deːɐ ˈbʏɐ.gɐ flaɪs gəˈʃa.fn̩ |]
[ˈʃʏ.tsə tʁɔʏ dɛs ˈkʁiː.gɐs kʁaft ‖]
[mɪt dɛs ˈgaɪ.stəs ˈhaɪ.tɐn ˈva.fn̩ |]
[ˈziː.gə kʊnst ʊnt ˈvɪ.sn̩ˌʃaft ‖]
[ˈzeː.gən zaɪ deːm lant bəˈʃiː.dən |]
[ʊnt zaɪn ʁuːm deːm ˈzeː.gən glaɪç ‖]
𝄆 [ˈgɔ.təs ˈzɔ.nə ʃtʁaːl ɪn ˈfʁiː.dən |]
[aʊf aɪn ˈglʏkˌlɪç ˈøː.stɐ.ʁaɪç ‖] 𝄇

[last ʊns fɛst tsuːˈza.mənˌhɛːl.tn̩ |]
[ɪn deːɐ ˈaɪnˌtʁaxt liːkt diː maxt ‖]
[mɪt fɛɐˈʔaɪn.tɐ ˈkʁɛf.tə ˈval.tn̩ |]
[vɪɐt das ˈʃveː.ʁə laɪçt fɔlˈbʁaxt ‖]
[last ʊns aɪns dʊɐç ˈbʁyː.dɐˌban.də |]
[ˈglaɪ.çm̩ tsiːl ɛnt.ˈgeː.gəŋˌgeːn ‖]
𝄆 [haɪl deːm ˈkaɪ.zɐ haɪl deːm ˈlan.də |]
[ˈøː.stɐ.ʁaɪç vɪɐt ˈeː.vɪç ʃteːn ‖] 𝄇

[an dɛs ˈkaɪ.zɐs ˈzaɪ.tə ˈval.tət |]
[iːm fɛɐˈvant dʊɐç ʃtam ʊnt zɪn ‖]
[ʁaɪç an ʁaɪts deːɐ niː fɛɐˈʔal.tət |]
[ʊns ʁə ˈhɔːl.də ˈkaɪ.zeː.ʁɪn ‖]
[vas als ˈglʏk tsuː høːçst gəˈpʁiː.zən |]
[ʃtʁøːm aʊf ziː deːɐ ˈhɪ.məl aʊs ‖]
𝄆 [haɪl fʁants ˈjoː.zɛf haɪl eˈliː.zən |]
[ˈzeː.gən ˈhapsˌbʊɐks ˈgan.tsm̩ haʊs ‖] 𝄇

English translation

God preserve, God protect,
Our Emperor, our Country!
Powerful through the support of the Faith,
He leads us with a wise hand!
Let us defend the Crown of his fathers,
Shielding it from every foe.
𝄆 Forever with the Habsburg Throne,
Austria's fate remains united. 𝄇

Devout and honest, true and open,
Let us stand for right and duty!
Let us, if needed, with joyous Hope,
Go courageously in the battle!
Mindful of the laurel wreaths,
That the army so often wove itself.
𝄆 Treasure and Blood for Our Emperor,
Treasure and Blood for Our Fatherland! 𝄇

What was wrought by the diligence of citizens,
may the soldier's power faithfully protect!
With cheery weapons of mind,
Arts and Science may triumph!
Blessings be granted into the Land,
And its fame match the blessings.
𝄆 God's sunshine in peace,
On a happy Austria! 𝄇

Let us always stand together,
For in unity there is power!
With our combined strength,
The difficult is easily overcome!
Let us, brotherly united,
Go towards the same goal.
𝄆 Hail to the Emperor, Hail to the Empire,
Austria will forever stand! 𝄇

At the side of Emperor prevails,
Related to him by descent and mind!
Rich in charm that never becomes outdated,
Our gracious empress!
What is praised as luck most highly,
Heaven pour on them!
𝄆 Hail to Franz Joseph, Hail to Elisabeth,
Blessing to the entire House of Habsburg! 𝄇

== See also ==
- "Heil dir im Siegerkranz"
- "North Dakota Hymn"
