= Lorenz Leopold Haschka =

Austrian poet & author (1749–1827)

- Born: 1 September 1749; Vienna, Archduchy of Austria
- Died: 3 August 1827 (aged 77); Vienna, Austrian Empire
- Writing career
- Genre: poet

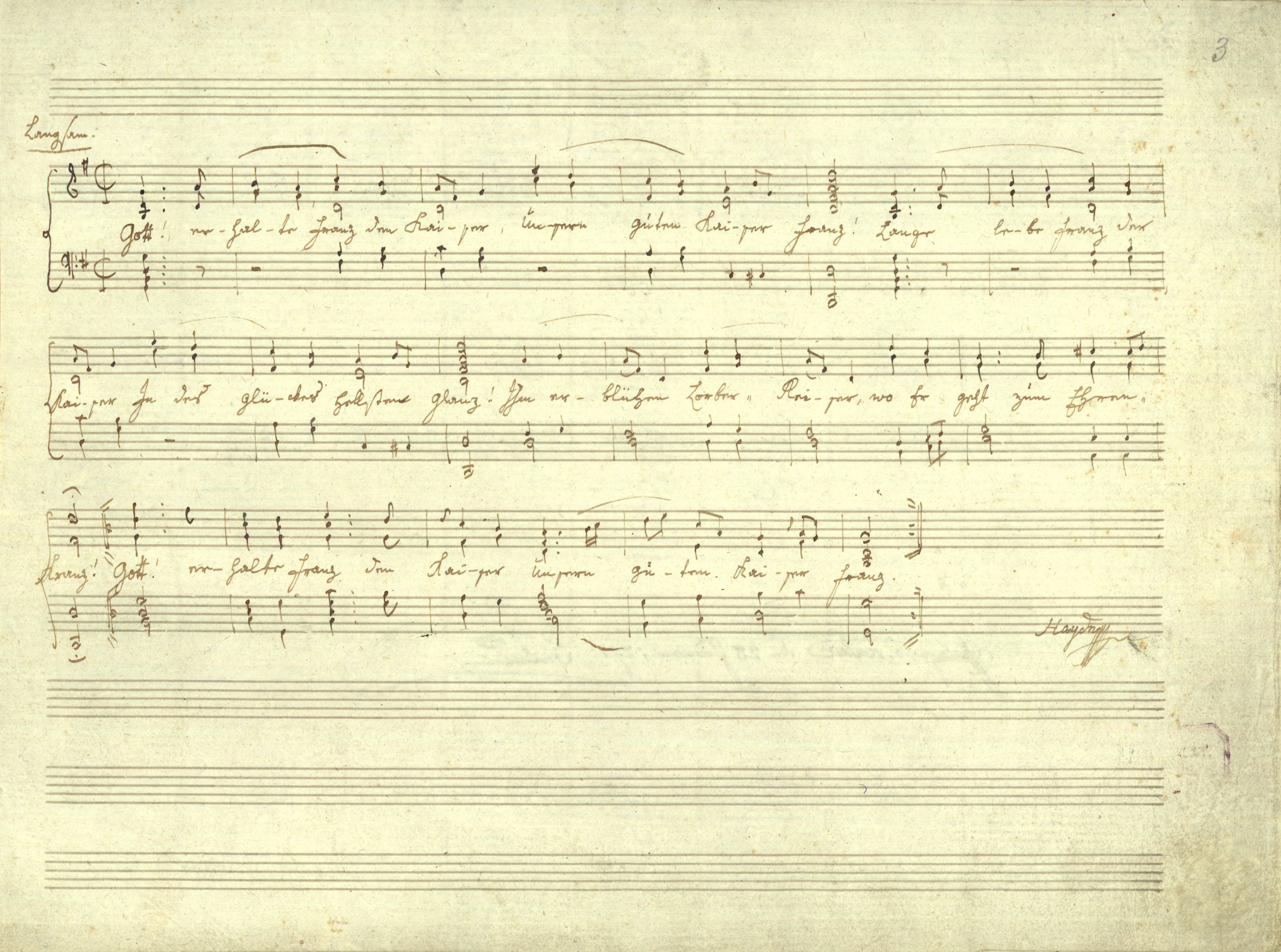
Kaiserlied (Piano sheet music with the first stanza by Lorenz Leopold Hashka), manuscript Joseph Haydn, 1797

Lorenz Leopold Haschka (1 September 1749 – 3 August 1827) was an Austrian poet and author of the words to Gott erhalte Franz den Kaiser, Austria's national anthem until 1918.

== Biography ==
Haschka was born and died in Vienna. In his youth, he was a member of the Society of Jesus. On the suppression of the Society (1773) he devoted himself, in secular life, to poetry, this was now to become his vocation and his means of livelihood. His pupil, the wealthy Johann Baptist von Alxinger, an imitator of Christoph Martin Wieland, came to his assistance. Haschka also found aid in the home of poet Karoline Pichler. Having left the Jesuits, under the influence of Josephinism, he became a freemason and wrote odes against the papacy during the presence of Pius VI in Vienna, as well as against the religious orders. He returned to Catholicism after the death of Joseph II, Holy Roman Emperor, and was selected to compose a national anthem, with music by Joseph Haydn, which was first sung on 12 February 1797, at the celebration of Francis II's birthday. Haschka was given a position as assistant in the library of the University of Vienna and was made instructor in aesthetics in the newly founded Theresianum. He retired in 1824.

== Work ==
- Unsere Sprache. 1784
- Die Könige. 1787
- Epinikion Herrn Johann August Starck. 1790 (Digitalisat in der Digitalen Bibliothek Mecklenburg-Vorpommern)
- Verwünschungen, den Franzosen ... gesungen im Februar, 1793. Wien: Mit v. Kurtzbekischen Schriften, 1793.
- Blutrache über die Franzosengerufen ... im November 1793. Wien, 1793.
- Das gerettete Teutschland gesungen zu Wien im November 1795, Ode. Wien, 1796.
- Gott, erhalte den Kaiser! Verfasset von Lorenz Leopold Haschka, In Musik gesetzet von Joseph Haydn, Zum ersten Mahle abgesungen den 12. Februar, 1797. Wien,
- Auf Denis Tod. 1800
- Auf die Vermählung Ihrer Kaiserlichen Hoheit Maria Ludovica, Erzherzogin von Österreich, mit Seiner Majestät Napoleon dem Ersten, Kaiser der Franzosen, ... am 11-ten März 1810, Ode. Wien: Strauß, 1810

== Sources ==
- cites:
  - Sommervogel, Bibliothèque de la Compagnie de Jesus
  - Gigitz, Grillparzer Jahrbuch, 1907, 32-127 (really a biography)
  - Johann Willibald Nagl and Jakob Zeidler, Deutsch-Österreichische Literaturgeschichte, last volume, p. 331, 336.
