= String Quartets, Op. 76 (Haydn) =

Six string quartets by Joseph Haydn

The six String Quartets, Op. 76, by Joseph Haydn were composed in 1797 or 1798 and dedicated to the Hungarian count Joseph Georg von Erdődy (Note: In full, Joseph Georg Erasmus Adrian Gabriel Michael Anton Franz von Erdödy.) (1754–1824). They form the last complete set of string quartets that Haydn composed. At the time of the commission, Haydn was employed at the court of Prince Nicolaus Esterházy II and was composing the oratorio The Creation as well as Princess Maria Hermenegild Esterházy's annual mass.

Although accounts left by visitors to the Esterházy estate indicate that the quartets were completed by 1797, an exclusivity agreement caused them not to be published until 1799. Correspondence between Haydn and his Viennese publishers Artaria reveal confusion as regards their release: Haydn had promised Messrs. Longman Clementi & Co. in London the first publishing rights, but a lack of communication led him to worry that their publication in Vienna might also be, unintentionally, their first appearance in full. In the event, their publication in London and Vienna was almost simultaneous.

The Op. 76 quartets are among Haydn's most ambitious chamber works, deviating more than their predecessors from standard sonata form and each emphasizing their thematic continuity through the seamless and near-continual exchange of motifs between instruments. In addition to not using the expected sonata form in some of the string quartets' first movements, Haydn employs uncommon forms in other movements such as a canon, a fantasy and an alternativo. He also plays with tempo markings, key signatures and many sections emphasizing the viola and cello. Charles Burney wrote to Haydn praising these innovations:

...they are full of invention, fire, good taste, and new effects, and seem the production, not of a sublime genius who has written so much and so well already, but of one of highly-cultivated talents, who had expended none of his fire before.

The set is one of the most renowned of Haydn's string quartet collections.

== List of Opus 76 quartets ==
Hoboken catalogue and First Haydn Edition (FHE, Ignaz Pleyel) numbers

- No. 1 in G major, Hob. III:75 (FHE No. 40)
- No. 2 in D minor ("Fifths"), Hob. III:76 (FHE No. 41)
- No. 3 in C major ("Emperor"), Hob. III:77 (FHE No. 42)
- No. 4 in B♭ major ("Sunrise"), Hob. III:78 (FHE No. 49)
- No. 5 in D major, Hob. III:79 (FHE No. 50)
- No. 6 in E♭ major, Hob. III:80 (FHE No. 51)

Each quartet consists of four movements.

== No. 1 ==
This G major quartet is numbered variously as No. 60, No. 40 (in the First Haydn Edition (FHE) and No. 75 (in the Hoboken catalogue, where its full designation is Hob.III:75). Although its opening key signature indicates that the work is in G major, the quartet moves in and out of G minor and the last movement begins in the key of G minor.

=== I. Allegro con spirito ===
An alla breve written in G major, is in sonata form. After a short introduction, the exposition begins in measure 3, ending in the dominant key of D major in measure 88. The development section lasts from measure 89 to 139, with the recapitulation beginning in G major in measure 140.

=== II. Adagio sostenuto ===
Written in C major and 2/4 time the movement uses sonata form. It has a hymn-like character and has been compared with the slow movements of Mozart's Jupiter symphony and Haydn's own 99th symphony.

=== III. Menuetto. Presto ===
The third movement in G major is the minuet, but, unusual in a minuet written at this time, the tempo indication is Presto, giving it the feel of a scherzo when played. The trio section is more lyrical and features the first violin playing a Ländler while accompanied pizzicato.

=== IV. Allegro ma non troppo ===
The final movement, alla breve in sonata form, is written in G minor rather than the expected G major, producing an unusual, darker ambience until G major returns for the movement's coda.

== No. 2 ("Fifths") ==
This quartet in D minor is numbered as No. 61, No. 41 (in the FHE) and Hob.III:76. In a reference to the motif of falling perfect fifths that appears throughout the first movement, it is known as the Fifths (or, in German, Quinten) quartet. The movements are:

=== I. Allegro ===
It is written in D minor, common time and is in sonata form. The falling fifths motif dominates the exposition section and is featured heavily in the development section using inversion, stretto and other devices.

=== II. Andante o più tosto allegretto ===
It is a ternary variation form in D major and 6/8 time.

=== III. Menuetto. Allegro ma non troppo ===
A D minor minuet in 3/4 time. It is unusual in that the movement is written like a canon and the trio section is written in the tonic major key as opposed to a relative key (in D major). It has been called the "Witches' Minuet" (Hexenminuett). The minuet is actually a two-part canon: the two violins play (in parallel octaves) above the viola and cello (also playing in parallel octaves) who follow one measure behind the violins. Haydn previously used a two-part canon with the lower string trailing the upper strings by a single bar in the minuet of his 44th Symphony.

=== IV. Vivace assai ===
The last movement, in D minor and 2/4 time, uses sonata form. It ends in D major.

== No. 3 ("Emperor") ==
The Quartet No. 62 in C major, Op. 76, No. 3, Hob. III:77, boasts the nickname Emperor (or Kaiser), because in the second movement is a set of variations on "Gott erhalte Franz den Kaiser" ("God save Emperor Francis"), an anthem he wrote for Emperor Francis II, which later became the national anthem of Austria-Hungary. This same melody is known to modern listeners for its later use in the German national anthem, the Deutschlandlied, which has been used since the Weimar Republic.

=== I. Allegro ===
The first movement of the quartet is in the home key of C major, in common time, and is written in sonata form. The musicologist László Somfai suggested (1986) that the opening notes have an extra-musical origin: they represent the initial letters of "Gott erhalte Franz den Caesar", assuming the license of using the original Latin spelling for "Kaiser" ("K" does not designate a musical note).

=== II. Poco adagio – cantabile ===
The second movement, in G major cut time, is in strophic variation form, with the "Emperor's Hymn" as the theme.

Samuel Adler has singled out this work's second movement as an outstanding example of how to score for string instruments, observing of the movement's final variation:

This is a wonderful lesson in orchestration, for too often the extremes in the range are wasted too early in a work, and the final buildup is, as a result, anticlimactic. The other formal factor to notice is that the entire structure is an accumulation of the elements which have slowly entered the harmonic and contrapuntal scheme in the course of the variations and have become a natural part of the statement [i.e. theme].

=== III. Menuetto. Allegro ===
The third movement, in C major and A minor, is a standard minuet and trio.

=== IV. Finale. Presto ===
The fourth movement, in C minor and C major, is in sonata form.

== No. 4 ("Sunrise") ==
The Quartet No. 63 in B♭ major, Op. 76, No. 4, is nicknamed Sunrise due to the rising theme over sustained chords that begins the quartet.

=== I. Allegro con spirito ===
==== Exposition ====
The opening of the movement begins in a way that seemingly contradicts the allegro con spirito marking. Violin II, viola, and cello sustain a tonic chord while the first violin plays the melody (the "sunrise" motif) on top. In measure 7, the same instruments sustain a dominant seventh chord while the first violin again plays a rising solo on top. In measure 22, all instruments reach forte, and allegro con spirito character is apparent through the sixteenth-note movement and lively staccato eighth notes trading off between the parts. In measure 37, the opening sunrise theme returns, this time with the solo in the cello and the sustained chords in the violins and viola. The lively sixteenth-note section returns in measure 50, beginning with sixteenth notes in the cello which move to the viola, and finally, the violins. In measure 60, all instruments drop to piano for a six-measure staccato eighth-note section before jumping to an all sixteenth-note fortissimo in measure 66 to finish off the exposition.

==== Development ====
The development in measure 69 begins with the same texture as the opening of the movement—with the 2nd violin, viola, and cello sustaining a chord while the 1st violin plays a solo on top. The first chord, sustained in bars 69–72, is a D minor chord, the relative minor of the dominant, F major. The second chord, sustained in bars 75–79, is an F♯ diminished seventh chord, resolving to G minor in measure 80, which signifies the return of trading moving sixteenth notes. The following five measures revolve around G minor, only to modulate to E♭ major in measure 86. The major tonality lasts but two measures, as it shifts to F minor in measure 88, F♯ diminished in 89, and G minor in measure 90. In measure 96 the violins play staccato eighth notes followed by eighth-note rests, while the viola and cello fill in the violins' eighth-note rests with their own eighth notes. This sets up a pattern for the rest of the development section, in which one instrument, mainly the 1st violin (in measures 98–102), fills in an eighth rest with a lone eighth-note, thus giving each measure a steady eighth-note pulse.

Throughout this section the dynamic gradually drops from forte to pianissimo by means of a poco a poco decrescendo. When the pianissimo is finally reached in measure 105, the retransition to the recapitulation begins, ending on the dominant seventh chord (F) of the original key, B♭ major.

==== Recapitulation ====
In measure 108, the beginning of the recapitulation begins just as the beginning of the exposition, with the 2nd violin, viola, and cello sustaining a tonic chord while the 1st violin plays the sunrise motif above it. In measure 135, the allegro con spirito sixteenth-note section returns in the 1st violin, punctuated by staccato eighth notes in the other instruments. The sixteenth notes trade off to the 2nd violin, culminating in an all-instrument unison in measure 140. After this, the opening theme returns again, with the solo line beginning with the cello and moving up through the viola to the 2nd violin. In measure 151, all strings crescendo to the returning sixteenth-note theme in measure 152.

In measure 162, the staccato eighth-note trade-off section returns, in the tonic key and piano dynamic. A fortissimo appears in measure 172, beginning the lead into the I^{7} chord fermata. Beginning in the following measure, the viola, and two violins pass each other the opening sunrise motif for a measure at a time, while the remaining instruments sustain chords. The tonic returns in measure 181, with a brief teaser of the staccato eighth-note theme, to be replaced by the sixteenth notes played by all instruments in the fortissimo dynamic. In the final three bars, all four instruments play a succession of tonic B♭ major chords.

== No. 5 ==
The Quartet No. 64, Op. 76, No. 5, is in D major. It is sometimes called the Largo or Friedhofsquartett (Graveyard-Quartet). Both monikers stem from its substantial slow movement, which dominates the work.

"[It is] called the Graveyard Quartet because the second movement ... is often played at burials", writes Sonia Simmenauer in her book Muss es sein?: Leben im Quartett. Another, more practical and ironic explanation states that it is called the "Graveyard" or "Cemetery" Largo because of the many sharps (the German word for musical sharps is Kreuze, which also means "crosses"): "The Friedhofs-Largo [Cemetery Largo](due to the many sharps!), dreaded for its deficient purity, is reminiscent of Bruckner," wrote Ernst Heimeran in 1936.Heimeran, Ernst (1936). Das stillvergnügte Streichquartett [The Quietly Happy String Quartet] (in German). München: Heimeran Verlag. p. 115. Original German text: "Das wegen seiner mangelhaften Reinheit gefürchtete Friedhof-Largo (wegen der vielen Kreuze!) gemahnt an Bruckner." This explanation aligns with the musical context, as the key of F♯ major (with six sharps) typically conveys light and clarity rather than sadness. Consequently, the nickname may stem purely from notation rather than a somber mood.

"The focus and core of the work is the extended Largo in the unusual and remote key of F♯ major", writes German music journalist Felix Werthschulte. "A melancholy-beautiful lament ... the main theme resounds, but becomes quieter and quieter, before the music finally falls silent. A farewell in tones—grieving, but also solemn and dignified." Werthschule adds that the movement "is still sometimes played at funeral services, because this music not only sounds sad, it also gives comfort."

=== I. Allegretto ===
The first movement (in D major, 6/8 time) departs from sonata form in favour of what Robin Golding calls "unorthodox variations".

=== II. Largo. Cantabile e mesto ===
The second movement, in F♯ major and cut time, is in sonata form.

=== III. Menuetto. Allegro ===
The third movement, in D major and D minor, is a standard minuet and trio

=== IV. Finale. Presto ===
The fourth movement, a Presto in cut time, is in an irregular sonata form.

== No. 6 ==
The Quartet No. 65 in E♭ major, Op. 76, No. 6, is sometimes called Fantasia Quartet after its second movement. It departs from common string quartet norms of his time including innovations such as changing time signatures, impromptu like themes and breaking traditional forms such as sonata form and binary forms and quoting an entire theme from another string quartet.

=== I. Allegretto – Allegro ===
Written in 2/4 time, instead of employing the typical sonata form it is written in the strophic variation form.

=== II. Fantasia. Adagio ===
A fantasia written in the key of B major (without a key signature) in 3/4 time. According to Hans Keller, author of The Great Haydn Quartets, the composer quotes in a different key his own second movement from Op. 76, No. 4, "Sunrise" Quartet. Indeed, the two basic motifs are identical aside from the difference in key signature: the first violin begins on the note of the key in each, goes down a half step, and returns to the original note in both movements, all under a slur in 3/4 time. Additionally, in both pieces, the viola and cello play in slurred succession the notes in the 3rd, 4th, 3rd and 1st, 2nd, 1st scale degrees, respectively. All of this occurs while the 2nd violin holds the 5th scale degree for the duration of the measure.

=== III. Menuetto. Presto ===
A minuet form in 3/4 time employing an old form in which the minuet section is in standard binary form while an alternative section (one single non-repeated section) replaces the more common trio (in binary form with two repeated sections). The alternative section is built upon a series of ascending and descending iambic scales where Haydn inverts the instrumentation from violin I to the cello and then cello through violin I several times.

=== IV. Finale. Allegro spiritoso ===
A frantic finale, in 3/4 time. It is in sonata form. The critic Richard Wigmore writes, "This is thoroughly engrossing music, forever deceiving the listener as to where the main beat comes."

== See also ==
- List of string quartets by Joseph Haydn

== Notes ==
=== Footnotes ===
Sources

- Grave, Floyd; Grave, Margaret (2006). he String Quartets of Joseph Haydn. New York: Oxford University Press. pp. 301–322. ISBN 9780195173574.
- Keller, Hans (1986). The Great Haydn Quartets: Their Interpretation. London: J. M. Dent & Sons. pp. 208–234.
