= Container (film) =

- Poster
- Directed by: Lukas Moodysson
- Starring: Jena Malone; Peter Lorentzon; Mariha Åberg
- Release date: 11 February 2006 (Berlin)
- Country: Sweden

Container is a Swedish film by Lukas Moodysson. It premiered at the 56th Berlin International Film Festival on February 11, 2006.

The movie is in black and white and was described by Moodysson as "a silent movie with sound". The only sound in the film is a spoken stream-of-consciousness monologue which is only loosely related to the visuals.

It was shot in Cluj, Romania, Chernobyl, Ukraine and Trollhättan, Sweden.

In 2010 director Sjaron Minailo adapted the movie into a multimedia opera performance with soprano Elena Vink with music by Henry Vega and Kasia Glowicka. The opera premiered at the Rotterdam Operadagen.

== Cast ==
- Jena Malone as The Woman / Speaker (voice)
- Peter Lorentzon as Man
- Mariha Åberg as Woman (voice)
