= Takuro Mizuta Lippit =

Takuro Mizuta Lippit (aka DJ Sniff; born in San Francisco, California) is a turn-tableist, curator and producer, who works in experimental electronic arts and improvised music.

== Life ==
Takuro Mizuta Lippit studied philosophy and art history at Keio University in Tokyo. As a musician, he is largely autodidact and has stated that he learned most of his skills from the internet. From 2008 to 2013, he was artistic director of STEIM in Amsterdam. He currently is an assistant visiting professor in the School of Creative Media at City University of Hong Kong.

== Work ==
Lippit combines DJing, instrument design and free improvisation. He is particularly known for his approach to the turntable as an autonomous musical instrument. His work engages with diverse forms of sonic media, ranging from archival collections of vinyl records to real-time digitally captured sounds during performances. His work often involves a combination of turntables and software instruments, many of which he developed at STEIM. In 2015, Lippit and composer Otomo Yoshihide founded 'Ensembles Asia', a pan-Asian network of experimental and electronic musicians.
