= Henry Vega =

- Born: Henry Vega; 1973 (age 51–52)
- Origin: New York City
- Genres: Electroacoustic, Experimental minimalism art
- Occupations: Composer, musician
- Instruments: computer, classical guitar

Henry Vega (born 1973) is a composer and Electroacoustic musician from New York City, currently living in The Hague, Netherlands. He founded The Spycollective in 2006, a now defunct music, theater and dance group, and is a founding director of Artek Foundation. Vega has been composing and performing internationally since 2001 and is also a founding member of The Electronic Hammer trio with Diego Espinosa and Juan Parra Cancino. He is married to Polish composer Kasia Glowicka.

== Education ==
Vega studied composition at Florida International University between 1993 and 1999 with the composer Orlando Jacinto Garcia and later between 1999 and 2004 he completed a Masters in Music at the University of North Texas studying under electroacoustic musician Jon Nelson. He moved to Europe in 2001, where he studied at the Institute of Sonology at the Royal Conservatory of The Hague and received a Master of Music in Sonology. Between 2004 and 2008, he then completed a PhD from Queen's University Belfast at the Sonic Arts Research Centre (SARC).

== Style ==
One of Vega's influences came from working with American composer Earle Brown, who was a modern proponent of the Open Form style of composition and a father of aleatoric music. This inspired Vega to compose pieces with the idea of "blocks of music," where performers had the freedom of interpretation (not improvisation) to play a block repeatedly until cue'd to another block. Vega said, ""This makes an impression of synchronicity between the performers, even though while they are in the block, they are completely unsynchronised."

In writing about performances during Gaudeamus Week in Amsterdam, Peter Grahame and Alexa Woolf praised Vega as a composer, "who is dedicated to the creation and promotion of electro-acoustic music; the three female singers (in Idoru in Metals) creating 'an idolized computer-programmed singer, whose imaginary capabilities are infinite'... Great sounds, and splendid dissemination of them in Amvest Zaal (Room in Beurs van Berlage).

In a 2012 interview, Vega noted several influences on his composition Wormsongs, including the futurist writings of philosopher Max More and a text from the artist Georg Hobmeier. He also noted the musical inspiration coming from composers such as Kenneth Gaburo, Philip Glass, and György Ligeti. The use of text and the musical style combine to inspire Vega in the potential of technology as a force in musical performance and composition. He said, "One of the themes that More talks about is overcoming the fear of technology, learning to coexist with it and internalize it."

Another work Vega composed from philosophical influence was Fogpatch, in collaboration with German media artist and architect, Daniel Fetzner and performance artist Georg Hobmeier (The SpyCollective). Vega's electronic compositions accompanied a theatrical performance based on an experience of German philosopher Max Bense. The project explored the fundamental conflicts between art and technology by reconstructing a traumatic body experience Bense had in San Francisco.

== Residency at STEIM ==
During his Artistic Residency at the Studio for Electro Instrumental Music (STEIM) in Amsterdam, Vega developed, composed, rehearsed and collaborated on projects such as the electronic-music theatre piece Iminami, his work Wormsongs and also the piece "Slow slower."

== Awards ==
- April, 2005 - Confluencias 3rd Intl. Competition of ElectroAcoustic Music - Finalist "The White Pieces" (Spain)
- November, 2006 - Musica Nova - 1st prize for "Idoru in Metals" (Prague, Czech Rep.)
- November, 2006 - International Biennale of Modern Art Crash - 1st prize for "Idoru in Metals" (Sczezin, Poland)
- June, 2007 - Dragon's Den at Queen's University Belfast - 1st prize for Iminami: From Mother to Smother with The Spy Collective (UK)
- December, 2012 - Cage 1, 2, 3 Composition Competition - 1st place for "The Infinite Land" from Wormsongs (Lublin)

== Selected works ==
- "Ssolo" (2002), for viola da gamba and computer. Performed by Karin Preslmayr at the Institute for Sonology
- "Liquidus" (2004), for percussion and 2 computers. Developed at the Institute for Sonology.
- "Idoru in Metals" (2004), for 2 sopranos, alto and computer. Composed for the Netherlands Vocaal Laboratorium (Vocaallab)
- "The Vapor Collisions" (2006), for mixed ensemble and computer. Composed at the Sonic Arts Research Centre, Belfast. Commissioned by Yannis Kyriakides and Roland Spekle from Ensemble MAE.
- "Izumi" (2007), for percussion and two computers. Created at Sonic Arts Research Centre, Belfast. Premiered at Musica Electronica Nova festival, Wroclaw Poland. Performed by The Electronic Hammer.
- "Iminami" (2007), interactive blend of drama, electronic music, dance and live video. Performed by The Spycollective. Commissioned by the Dutch Fund for the Creation of Music and ARGEkultur in Salzburg
- "The Hallelujah Drones" (2008), for six voices and computer. Performed by VocaalLab Nederlands at Gaudeamus Music Festival, Amsterdam
- "Music in still parts" (2009), for violin, cello, saxophone, clarinet, percussion, piano, electronics. Performed by Ensemble Integrales
- "Stream Machines and the Black Arts" (2010), for electronic violin, electronics and video. Commissioned & Performed by Barbara Lunenburg
- "Slow slower" (2011), for recorder, viola da gamba, harpsichord and computer. Commissioned & Performed by the Roentgen Connection
- "The motion of arrayed emotion" (2011), for string quartet and computers. Performed by Ragazze String Quartet
- "A Thousand Tones" (2012), for electronics. Commissioned by Juraj Kojs for On Silence: Hommage to Cage
- "Victory over the Sun" (2013), a music theater piece commissioned by the Stedelijk Museum Amsterdam with director Sjaron Minailo

== Discography ==
- Idoru in Metals (2005), for 3 voices and electronics, Int'l Computer Music Conference (ICMC) CD
- Weapon of Choice (DVD), "Stream Machines and the Black Arts," for electric violin, electronics and video
- Anthology of Dutch Electronic Music 1999-2010, "The Hallelujah Drones," for 6 voices and electronics
- How to philosophize with a hammer (2007), Album with The Electronic Hammer
- Wormsongs (2011), with Anat Spiegel
- Stream Machines (2013), CD

== See also ==
- List of string quartet composers
- New Compositions for Viol Instrument
