= Martijn Padding =

Dutch composer and educator (born 1956)

Martijn Padding (born 24 April 1956) is a Dutch composer and educator.

Padding was born in Amsterdam, and was taught by Louis Andriessen (composition), Geert van Keulen (instrumentation) and Fania Chapiro (piano). He also studied sonology at the University of Utrecht. He is the head of the Composition Department at the Royal Conservatory of The Hague, where he has mentored composers such as Katarina Glowicka.

His compositions are often the result of a close working relationship with the musicians themselves. Padding's collaboration, since 1998, with the avant-garde quintet Ensemble LOOS has resulted in a number of works, both with and without electronics. The ensemble played the premiere of the opera Tattooed Tongues, to a libretto by Friso Haverkamp, at the Warsaw Autumn Festival in 2001. Padding's works are performed by prominent ensembles, soloists and orchestras in the Netherlands and abroad.

Additionally he has made radio documentaries, and was the longtime piano accompanist of the modern dance company led by Krisztina de Châtel.
