= Kasia Glowicka =

Polish computer music composer (born 1979)

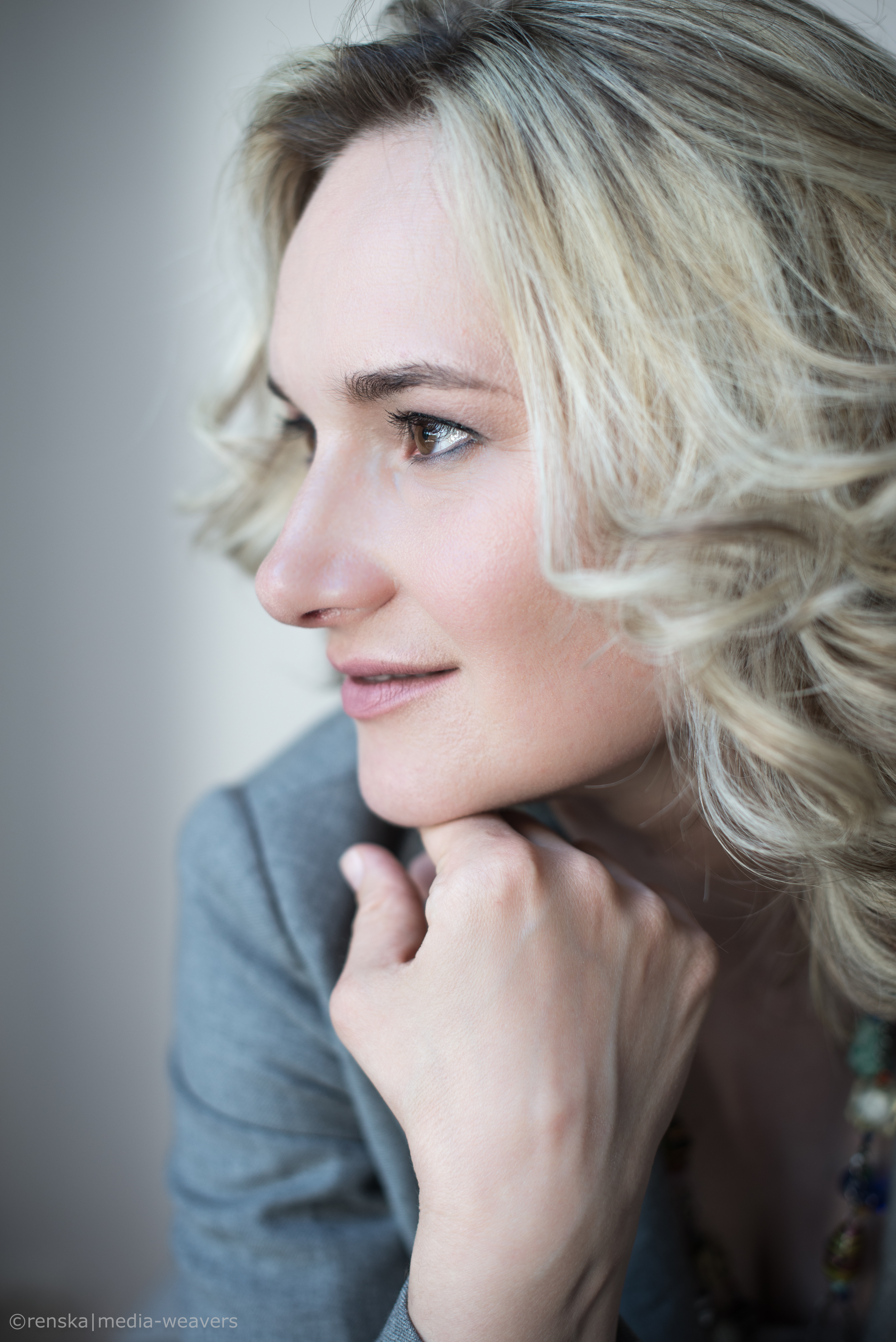
- Glowicka in 2020

Background information
- Born: Katarzyna Głowicka; 1979 (age 46–47); Oleśnica, Wrocław Voivodeship, Polish People's Republic
- Origin: Poland
- Genres: Experimental, minimalism, art music
- Occupation: Composer

Kasia Glowicka (born Katarzyna Głowicka, October 12, 1979), also known as Katarina Glowicka, is a Polish composer and lecturer of computer music at the Royal Conservatory of Brussels.

Her body of musical work encompasses compositions for opera, theater, ballet and film. As a playwright, she focuses her work on contemporary social issues.

As a composer, her work spans a range of styles in experimental, minimalism, Avant-garde, art music and contemporary classical music genres, written for orchestra, small ensembles, or solos and often accompanied by electronic music.

In 2004 she married composer Henry Vega and they reside in the Netherlands. They are founding directors of the Artek Foundation and its recording label, ARTEKsounds.

Glowicka's collaborations include works with the Dutch symphony orchestra Het Balletorkest, an affiliate of Het Nationale Ballet, plus Ensemble Recherche and Ties Mellema. Her scores are published by the Dutch institute Donemus.

== Early life and education ==
Glowicka was born in Oleśnica. She graduated from the Academy of Music in Wrocław in 2001 after studying with the composer Grażyna Pstrokońska-Nawratil. During 2000 she held an internship with Italian composer Ivan Fedele at the Conservatory in Strasbourg and later studied with Dutch composers, Louis Andriessen and Martijn Padding at the Royal Conservatory of The Hague, of which she is also a graduate. She also completed a PhD focusing on computer music at the Sonic Arts Research Centre at the Queen's University Belfast in 2008.

== Awards and commissions ==
As early as 1999, Glowicka's piece Gindry for bass and string orchestra won the Adam Didur All-Polish Composition Competition. In 2001, at just 23 years old, Glowicka was short-listed along with librettist Jerzy Lukosz for the Genesis Prize, from the London-based Genesis Foundation for their Opera The King's Gravedigger and an act from the piece was performed at the Almeida Theatre.

She has also been recognized by the Holland Symfonia Competition and won awards from the European Commission, the International Biennale of Modern Art Crash and the Polish Section of the International Society for Contemporary Music awards for her 1999 work "Summer's day."

In 2004 she received a distinction in the Musica Sacra Polish Composers Competition. Her piece Opalescence won 1st Prize at the Bourges Competition for Electronic Music and was shortlisted for the SPNM awards in 2006.

A few of the many commissions Glowicka received for her works have come from the Society of Promotion of New Music in London for the BBC Scottish Ensemble to perform the piece Perpetuity for the ‘Sounds New’ Festival in Aberdeen and the piece was later featured in the 18th International Review of Composers in Belgrade in 2009. Another commission came from a grant by the Polish Ministry of Culture for the CD recording of "Springs and Summers."

In 2012 she was commissioned to compose a piece for the New York program "On Silence" marking the centennial of John Cage’s birth, with 12 other composers who were asked, "to reflect on what Cage means in their creative life."

== The Airport Society ==
Glowicka, alongside director Krystian Lada, is a founder member of The Airport Society, a Brussels-based cooperative of “opera artists and social entrepreneurs” which creates works focused on social justice issues.

For its 2018 production, the group adapted poems written by Afghan women living under Taliban rule. The content of these poems would have incurred severe punishment for the writer had they been discovered, up to and including the death penalty.

The new work - Unknown, I Live With You - featured mezzo-soprano opera singer Małgorzata Walewska and met with critical acclaim upon its release. The work and the story behind it were the subject of a feature article in a print edition of Vogue Poland.

The cast included American transgender baritone Lucia Lucas. Glowicka told an interviewer that Polish state media, following government guidelines, censored her while promoting the work and told her she was "not allowed to mention or discuss" the inclusion of a transgender singer in the cast.

== Lilian ==
For its 2020 festival season, Polish cultural festival Warsaw Autumn challenged Glowicka to create her first-ever radio play.

To create the piece, entitled Lilian, Glowicka drew on a 320-page transcript of real WhatsApp messages exchanged between a refugee trapped in Libya and the eponymous Lilian, a professor at a European university. She has talked of the technical challenges in creating the work "not only [as] my first radio play, it was also the first time anyone would be attempting to take a WhatsApp conversation – complete with photos, emojis, and so on – and try and adapt that into a performative work."

== Residency at STEIM ==
Glowicka held an Artistic Residency at the Studio for Electro Instrumental Music (STEIM) in Amsterdam, composing and performing pieces that included traditional instruments, live video and electronics. In 2009 she presented the piece Quasi Rublev, inspired by Andrei Tarkovsky's 1966 film Andrei Rublev, with Goska Isphording playing harpsichord and Roos Theuws performing live visuals.

Together with video artist Emmanuel Flores, Glowicka presented Turbulence performed solely by computer and visuals, noting the influence of Austrian filmmaker Gustav Deutsch. In 2010 Glowicka and Flores collaborated again with the 15 minute performance piece RETINa inspired by the pioneering science of Étienne-Jules Marey that impacted cinema and the early documentary filmmaker Dziga Vertov.

== Style ==
Glowicka's distinct style of composition has been described as having the "specific power of expression and coloring," through using the computer as both a musical instrument and compositional tool.

In a 2006 interview Glowicka said that the strongest, external influences on her music are: "technology - because I cannot write a piece now without electronics as I am fascinated by it, and science in the way that I'm structuring my pieces in order to mirror or extend natural physical phenomenon."

This was later emphasized by her project notes on the piece Turbulence while in artistic residency at STEIM: "The project Turbulence is inspired by physical phenomenon – its force, unpredictability and its complexity."

== Selected works ==
- Gindry (1998), for bass and string orchestra
- Springs and Summers (1999), for String Quartet and countertenor, music set to Shakespeare's sonnets
- Microgalaxies (2003), chamber piece for vocal ensemble, commissioned for Wien Modern festival in Austria
- Exophony (2006), for electronics and symphonic orchestra
- Opalescence (2006), for 3 voices and electronics
- The King's Gravedigger (2006), chamber opera with libretto by Jerzy Lukosz
- Perpetuity (2008), for string orchestra and electronics, written for BBC Scottish Ensemble
- Quasi Rublev (2009), for harpsichord, live video and electronics, performed at STEIM
- Turbulence (2009), for live video and electronics, performed at STEIM
- RETINAn (2011), for piano, live video and electronics, performed at STEIM, SPOR Festival and the Gaudeamus Festival
- "1, 43, 33, 43, 33, 43, 33, 43, 1" (2012), for piano, objects and electronics in On Silence: Hommage to Cage
- Music in three parts (2012), collaboration with DJ Philipe Petite and ECO
- "Presence" (2007) on V/A Solitude of Sound – in memoriam Tomasz Sikorski (2013), Bolt Records
- Red Sun (2014) album with Margaret Walentynowicz on Bolt Records/ARETEkSounds.
- Seven Sonnets (2015) album with expanded compositions from "Springs and Summers," music set to Shakespeare's sonnets on Bolt Records/ARETEkSounds.
- Requiem For An Icon (2015) chamber opera commissioned by Polish National Theater, based on the life of Jackie Kennedy.
- Opera For The Unknown Woman (2016) opera and multi-media theatre piece
- Aria di Potenza (2017), opera
- Unknown, I Live With You (2019), opera for female voices, string quartet and live electronics,
- Searching for Tereska (2019) score for television documentary
- Lilian (2020) Radio play commissioned by Warsaw Autumn cultural festival

== See also ==
- Notable students of Louis Andriessen
- List of String Quartet Composers
