= STEIM =

Dutch electronic music organization

STEIM (STudio for Electro Instrumental Music) was a center for research and development of new musical instruments in the electronic performing arts, located in Amsterdam, Netherlands. Beginning in the 1970's, STEIM became known as a pioneering center for electronic music, where the specific context of electronic music was always strongly related to the physical and direct actions of a musician. In this tradition, STEIM supported artists in residence such as composers and performers, but also multimedia and video artists, helping them to develop setups which allowed for bespoke improvisation and performance with individually designed technology.

== Background ==
STEIM existed since 1969. It was founded by Misha Mengelberg, Louis Andriessen, Peter Schat, Dick Raaymakers, Jan van Vlijmen, Reinbert de Leeuw, and Konrad Boehmer. This group of Dutch composers had fought for the reformation of Amsterdam's feudal music structures; they insisted on Bruno Maderna's appointment as musical director of the Concertgebouw Orchestra and enforced the first public fundings for experimental and improvised electronic music in the Netherlands. They were offered a budget for their collective multimedia opera "Reconstruction" which was premiered in the Holland Festival in 1969. The technology used in this opera was then taken to Amsterdam's Prinseneiland which was STEIM's first location. Soon, in 1971, the studio moved to the Groenburgwal in the city center, where there was more space for workshops and concerts. From 1986-2015, STEIM was located at the Achtergracht in the city center's southern area in a building containing including three studios, a concert hall, hard and software workshops, offices, and a guesthouse. Under the direction of Michel Waisvisz (1949-2008, artistic director since 1981), the STEIM residency program attracted international artists to develop individual instruments and interfaces for the performance of electronic music.

After moving to a smaller location near the Lelylaan station in 2015, STEIM officially ceased to exist as an organization at the end of 2020 due primarily to cuts within the Dutch national cultural funding system.

== Selected STEIM instruments ==
=== Hardware ===
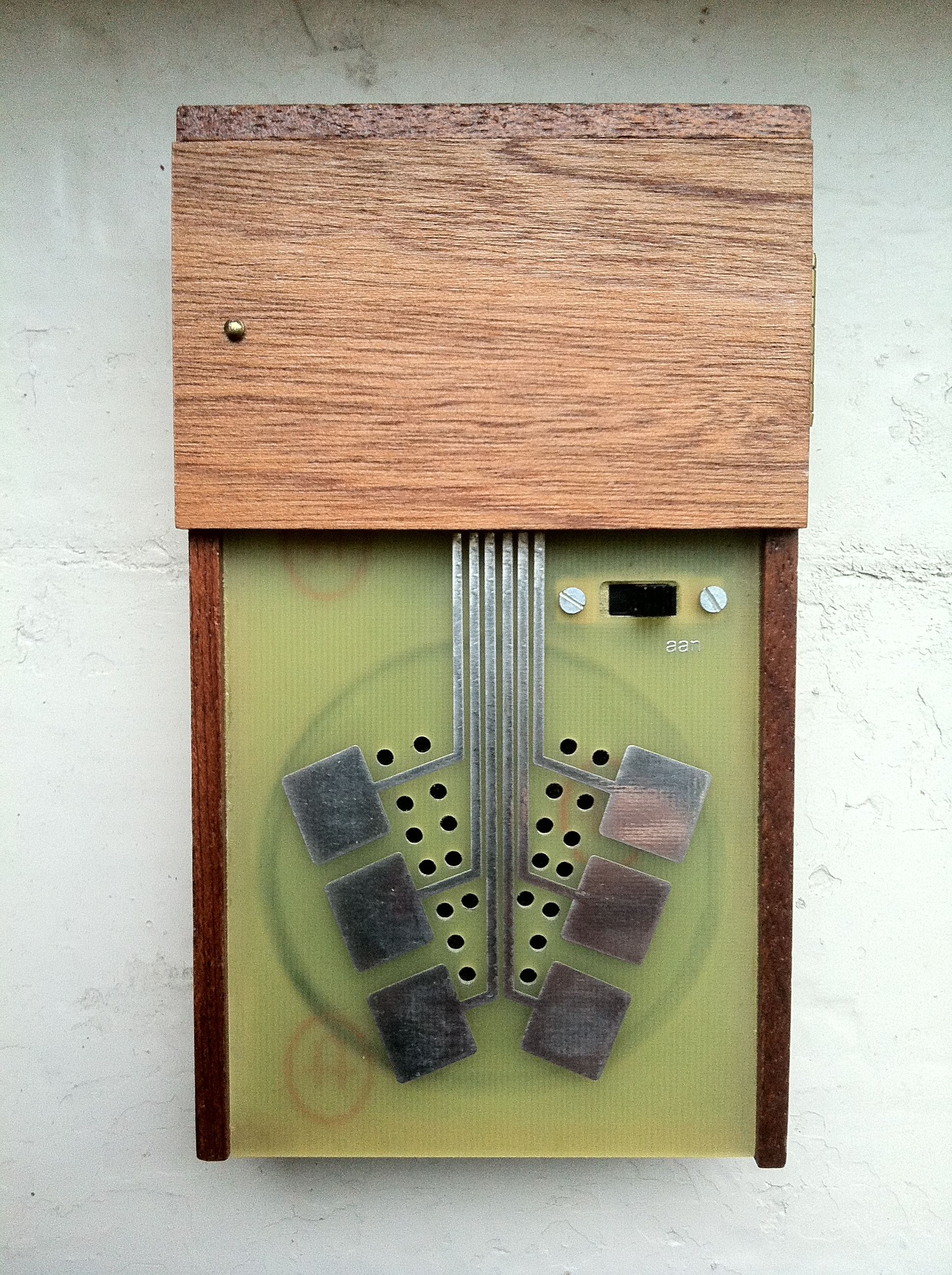
Crackle Box

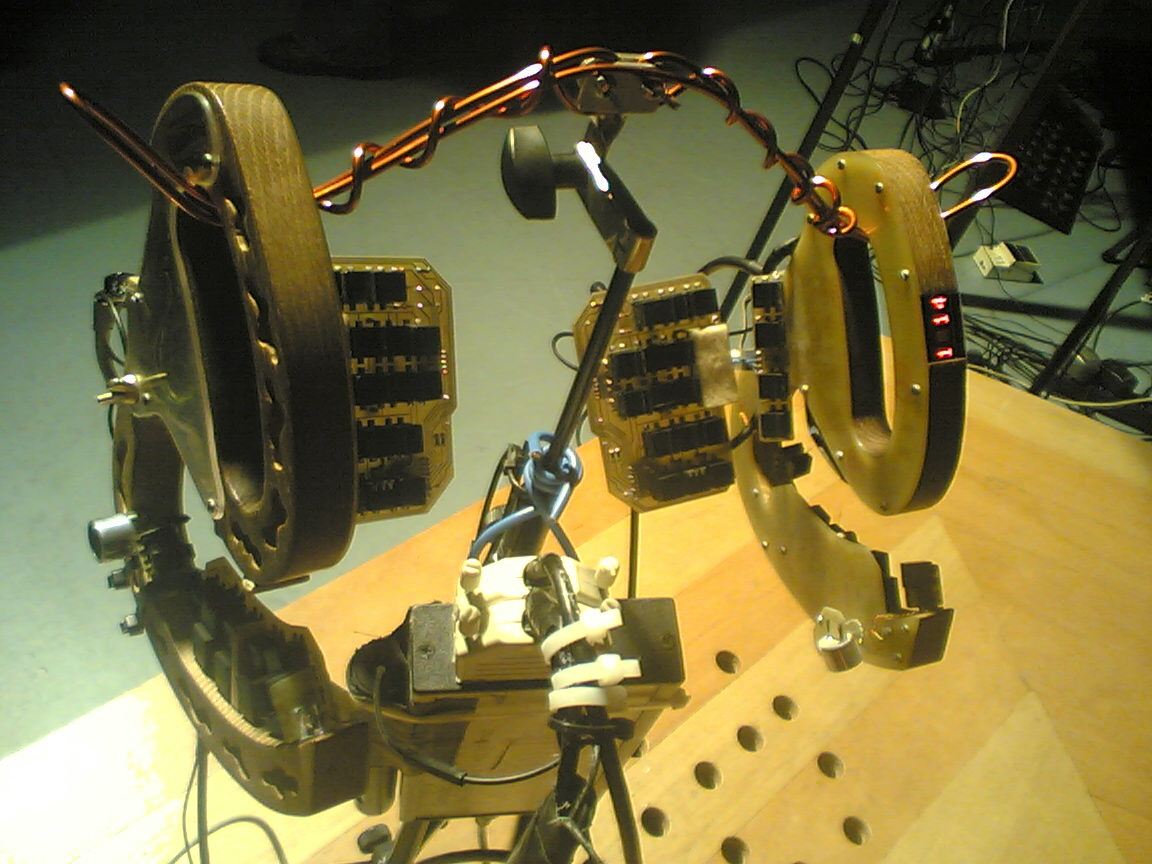
The Hands

- Black Box System (Zwarte Dozen), by Rob van de Poel (1972)
- Eemnes Machines, by Victor Wentink (1975–79)
- Crackle Box (Kraakdoos), Crackle Synth, by Michel Waisvisz, Geert Hamelberg, Peter Beyls and Nico Bes (1975)
- The Hands, by Michel Waisvisz (since 1984). One of the world's first gestural MIDI controllers. Two wooden frames for the hands with switches, potentiometers, tilt sensors, and ultrasound.
- Hyperstring Project, by Jon Rose. Extending a Violin Bow with Sensors. (since 1985)
- STEIM Sensor-Lab. Portable Mini-Computer which translates analogue Sensor data into MIDI Code. (1989)
- The Web, by Michel Waisvisz (1990)
- The Sweatstick, by Ray Edgar (1990)
- The Lady's Glove, by Laetitia Sonami (1991)
- Nic Collins: Midi Concertina (1992)
- Chromasone, by Walter Fabeck (1994)
- Mutantrumpet, by Ben Neill (2008)
- Stone with Nails, by Reyes Oteo (2009)

=== Software ===
- Lick Machine, by Frank Baldé (1989-1995). MIDI Macro-Controlling Software
- LiSa, by Michel Waisvisz and Frank Baldé. Realtime software instrument for live sampling and realtime audio manipulation (since 1995) LiSa info
- Big Eye, by Tom Demeyer. Video to MIDI converter (1995-2001)
- Image/ine, by Steina Vasulka and Tom Demeyer. Software instrument for realtime video manipulation (1996-2001)
- MIDI Joy, by Frank Baldé. Mapping game controllers to MIDI Code (1997-2002)
- JunXion, by Michel Waisvisz and Frank Baldé. Mapping game controllers, audio, video and sensor data to MIDI and OSC (since 2003) junXion info

== STEIM touch philosophy ==
As a headline for most of STEIM's instrumental developments it can apply that "Touch is crucial in communicating with the new electronic performance art technologies". As in traditional musical instruments, it is believed here that also in contemporary developments the physical touch of a musician contains essential aesthetic factors. These qualities tend to get lost in the non-realtime use of studio technology, in which the process of music production gets rather rational but bodily involved. The Touch philosophy — which can be considered as STEIM's interpretation of the widely used term interactivity — theoretically subsumes several stages of STEIM's developments, from the analogue touchable "Crackle" surfaces in the 1970s to today's experimental Gestural MIDI Interfaces.

== Structure and people ==
STEIM was a foundation whose primary financial support came from the Dutch ministry of Culture. It invited international artists in residence of all different musical and artistic styles and scenes. Aside from offering support in theoretic and practical development of contemporary musical instruments, STEIM also hosted in-house concerts, exhibitions and workshops. The work in progress of supported artists was presented during open studio events.

=== Artistic/managing directors ===
- Peter Schat, 1971-1973
- Working group: Misha Mengelberg, Louis Andriessen, Michel Waisvisz, Victor Wentinck, Gilius van Bergeijk, Huib Emmer, Dick Raaijmakers 1973-1981
- Michel Waisvisz, 1981-2008
- Dick Rijken, 2009-2020

=== Artistic guest directors ===
- George E. Lewis; Joel Ryan; Clarence Barlow, 1985 - ca. 1990
- Nicolas Collins, 1992-1995
- Steina Vasulka, 1996-1997
- Sally Jane Norman, 1998-2000
- Daniel Schorno; Netochka Nezvanova, 2001-2003
- Daniel Schorno, 2003-2004
- Jan St. Werner, 2004-2006
- Mazen Kerbaj; Atau Tanaka, 2006-2008
- Tarek Atoui; Tina Blaine, 2008
- Takuro Mizuta Lippit; 2008-2013

=== Artistic residency ===
- Kasia Glowicka (2011)
- Mark Trayle (2010)
- Henry Vega (2009/10)
- John Richards (2007)
- Andi Otto (2005-2010)
- Marko Ciciliani (2006/2007)
- Benton C Bainbridge (1999)
- Peter Cusack (1996)
- Art Clay (1993)
- Carlos Sandoval (1994-2007)
- Tom Cora (1992)
- Dominic Alldis (1988)

=== Technicians, studio staff ===
- Jan Herrmann Verpoorten (1969-1971)
- Nico Bes (1971-2021)
- Rob van de Poel (1971-1980)
- Wim Wansink (1971-1972)
- Robert Huiskens (1975)
- Johan den Biggelaar (1972-1986)
- Paul Godschalk (ca. 1981-1984)
- Paul Hogeweg (ca. 1981-1984)
- Hans Venmans (ca. 1984-1987)
- Hayo Den Boeft (1983–92)
- Aad te Bokkel (ca. 1980-83)
- Paul Spaanderman (1983-1991)
- Peter Cost (1987-1992)
- Bob van Baarda (1992-1995)
- Rob Keijzer (1993)
- Ray Edgar (1994-1997)
- Jorgen Brinkman (1995-2008)
- Daniel Schorno (1997-2007)
- René Wassenburg (2001-2007)
- Byung-Jun Kwon (2006-2010)
- Marije Baalman (2010-2016)
- Nicolo Merendino (2013-2016)
- Sybren Danz (2013-2018)

=== Software developer ===
- Frank Baldé (1986-2020)
- Peter Cost (1987-1992)
- Tom Demeyer (1988-2000)

== See also ==
- Netochka Nezvanova - artistic guest director at STEIM, 2001-2003
- V2 Institute for the Unstable Media
- WORM, organisation in Rotterdam
- iii (Instrument Inventors Initiative), organisation in The Hague
