= Roos Theuws =

Dutch painter

- Born: Rosalina Maria Theuws; 1957-09-20; Valkenswaard
- Education: Jan van Eyck Academie

Roos Theuws (Valkenswaard, 1957) is a Dutch media and video artist.

== Life ==
Roos Theuws studied from 1974 to 1979 in Tilburg to become a Tehatex teacher (also known as "Tekenen, Handvaardigheid en Textiele werkvormen"). From 1981 to 1983 she went to the Jan van Eyck Academie in Maastricht. With the Stichting Time Based Arts, founded in 1983, she aimed to make the form of video art to be recognized by museums and galleries at the same level as other art mediums. Roos Theuws was closely related to the Association of Video Artists who helped shape the creation of Montevideo / Time Based Arts in 1986. It became the national centre for media art in the Netherlands and supported the creation of video art in a period when the Dutch video art movement was still struggling with the challenges of acknowledging video art as an art form. Since 1995 she teaches in Amsterdam at the Fine Arts departement of the Gerrit Rietveld Academie.

== Reception within the Netherlands (notable group exhibitions) ==
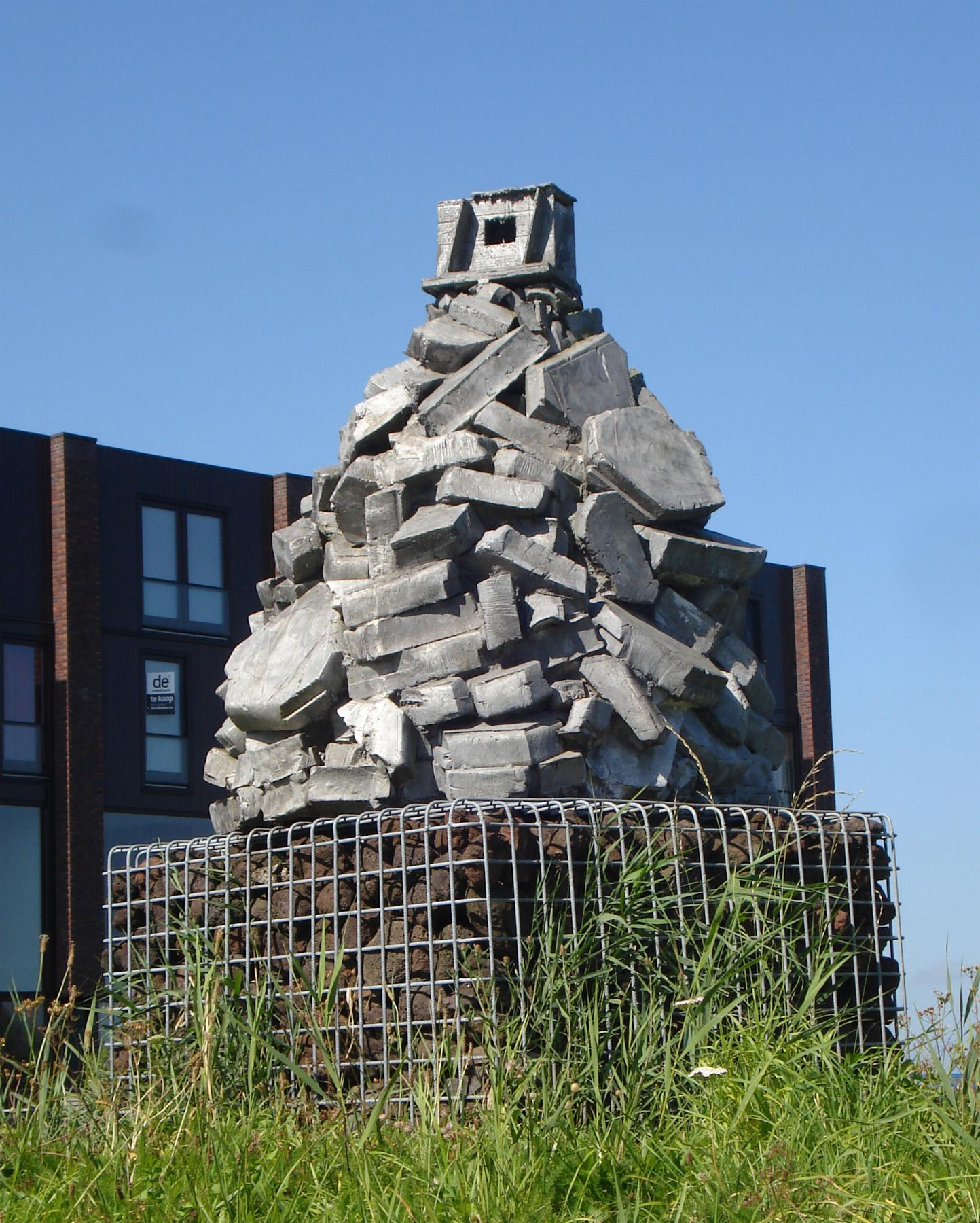
Sculpture by Roos Theuws "Beg, scream and shout" (2002)

=== Negen (Nine) ===
Witte de With organized the group exhibition Negen (Nine) in 1991 to present the qualities of contemporary art in the Netherlands at the time. Chris Dercon and Gosse Oosterhof who curated the exhibition, stated that there was little in Dutch art to get excited about. The artworks in the show were exceptions and transcended “such vague notions as regionalism and nationalism.” After its debut in Rotterdam the exhibition travelled to three other venues in Europe: the Museo d’Arte Contemporanea Luigi Pecci in Prato, the Kunstverein in Düsseldorf and the Provinciaal Museum in Hasselt.

According to Lynne Cooke most participating artists were involved in continuing a longstanding tradition centering in on seventeenth-century Dutch art. The art historian referenced The Art of Describing: Dutch Art in the Seventeenth Century by Svetlana Alpers. Among other artworks Forma Lucis III (1986), Forma Lucis IX (1989) and Untitled (So That I Can Build For Him A House no. 4) (1990) by Roos Theuws were part of the exhibition. Lynne Cooke claimed the visual inspection, empirical curiosity and the objective scrutiny of the eye explored in the artworks were “directed to ends that bypass symbol and allegory, leaving apprehension in the realm of sensation, of the seen.” Curator Jan van Adrichem claimed that the installations by Roos Theuws expressed the artist's interest in the visual properties of light.

=== IMAGO, fin de siècle in Dutch art ===
Forma Lucis VI (1989) by Roos Theuws was part of the exhibition IMAGO. It was a traveling exhibition, financed by the Rijksdienst Beeldende Kunst (The Netherlands Office for Fine Arts), about contemporary art and technology. For the exhibition, René Coelho brought together the work of 14 Dutch artists who all believed that the creative potential of contemporary technology should be explored. At the end of the twentieth century artists wanted to show that the "efficient, dominating and massifying products of electronics" could be used for more beautiful and imaginative purposes. These artworks were shown in venues in Switzerland, Japan, Slovakia, Hungary, Portugal, Spain and Taiwan.

The catalogue of the exhibition contains a dialogue between sociologist and media researcher Volker Grassmuck and economist and philosopher Asada Akira. The latter argues that contemporary media art consisted of a critical analysis of the system of representation. According to Asada Akirta the relationship between contemporary art and technology was similar to the relationship in the seventeenth century between the artworks by Vermeer and the research by Christiaan Huyghens and Van Leeuwenhoek who laid the foundation for optics.

== Collaborations ==
Roos Theuws worked with Kasia Glowicka, who composed music for the artwork CONVOLUTION KERNEL II (2008). The collaboration also went the other way, with Glowicka's live performance Quasi Rublev (2009) being accompanied by visuals from video artists, including by Roos Theuws. Also was the composition Luminescence (2009) inspired by Roos Theuws' concept of light.

The departement of optics at Universiteit van Amsterdam are credited for their help for in an artwork from 1984. To make the artwork Kitab al Manazir (2014), Roos Theuws worked with the collection from the science museum Museum Boerhaave.

== Overview of artworks ==
Non-exhaustive list of artworks:
Year	Title	In collection of	Identifier	Format / Materials	Size
2006	GAUSSIAN BLUR			single channel video	14''
2007	FRIGHTFLIGHTFIGHT			single channel video	3.15''
2007	CONVOLUTION KERNEL I			multichannel video	50.15''
2008	CONVOLUTION KERNEL II			multichannel video	15''
2005	THE HAZARD RATE 1			single channel video	4'
2005	THE HORSESMITH			two channel video	4.07''
2005	THE HAZARD RATE 2			single channel video	3.15''
1997	214 SLAGEN			single channel video	2.07''
2005	VOYAGER I			c-print	192,5 x 129 cm
2005	VOYAGER II			c-print	192,5 x 129 cm
2005	VOYAGER III			c-print	192,5 x 129 cm
2005	VOYAGER IV			c-print	192,5 x 129 cm
2005	WANGANUI I	museum Huis Marseille	HMA-2007-13	c-print	192,5 x 129,5 cm
2005	WANGANUI II	museum Huis Marseille	HMA-2007-14	c-print	192,5 x 129,5 cm
	WANGANUI III			c-print	192,5 x 129,5 cm
	WANGANUI IV			c-print	192,5 x 129,5 cm
	HET BEHOUDEN HUYS I			c-print	
2002	BEG, SCREAM & SHOUT	Balthasarschans, Gemeente Zoetemeer	2154	cast aluminium, basaltstones	
1998	BEG, SCREAM & SHOUT			video-installation, (216 beats), 2 beamers	
	CATCH ON THE REBOUND			hospital linen, iron frame with hook, latex, roofmate	270 x 50 x 50 cm
1985	FORMA LUCIS II	Stedelijk Museum Amsterdam	BA 4036(1-4)_239	videosculpture	129 x 80 x 90 cm
1986	FORMA LUCIS III	Bonnefantenmuseum	1003567	2 monitors, multiplex	15 minutes and 210 x 120 x 90 cm
1991	Heart & Eyes	Bonnefantenmuseum	1003723	cast aluminium, aluminium tubes, wax	299 x 103 x 66 cm
1987	Zonder titel	Bonnefantenmuseum	1003529	glas, aluminium, steel, varnish	115 x 219 x 4 cm
1993	Zonder titel	Bonnefantenmuseum	1004067	wood, styren-butadien rubber, handmade white gesso paint, clamps	140 x 100 x 55 cm
1990	FORMA LUCIS V			2 monitors, videosculpture, perspex, wood	
1989	FORMA LUCIS VI	Rijksdienst voor het Cultureel Erfgoed and LIMA	inv. nr. K90112 A-G	Plywood, glass, paint, 2 CRT monitors, 2 video files, media players	65 x 105 x 83 cm & 65 x 195 x 83 cm, 21'33" & 8'00"
1991	FORMA LUCIS IX	Rijksdienst voor het Cultureel Erfgoed		glass, wood, perspex, video, 2 monitors	65 x 88 x 112 cm
1994	FORMA LUCIS XIII (DIE GESCHEITERTE HOFFNUNG)				204 x 237 x 205 cm
1997	UNEQUAL THINGS MEASURED BY EACH OTHER	Stedelijk Museum Amsterdam	1999.1.0114(1-3)	video + monitor, wax, roofmate, hospital linen, iron frame, hook, wire	300 x 475 x 600 cm
1993	O & E	Stedelijk Museum Amsterdam	1993.1.0303	iron, wood, aluminium, rubber tubing, lamps, electricity wire, fluorescent light-tubes	135 x 280.5 x 200 cm
1994	SO THAT I CAN BUILD FOR HIM A HOUSE			iron, rotating motor on timer, stainless steel mill, text	
1996	WO EIS IST, IST KÜHLE FÜR ZWEI			iron tableframe, axe, wire, roofmate, hospital linen	240 x 180 x 190 cm
1993	FIRST STEPS			aluminium, red rubber tubing, clips, coasters	97 x 180 x 188 cm
1993	TUMBLED OVER RIM			iron, wood, aluminium, rubber tubing, lamps, electricity wire, monitor	120 x 280 x 200 cm
1994	ROGIER V.D. WEIJDEN			steel, monitor, rubber tubing	220 x 240 x 90 cm
1998	WALL I			papier-mâché, wood, chicken wire	270 x 180x 60 cm
1999	BALANCING WALL			papier-mâché, chicken wire, wood, steel beam, small monitor	280 x 260 x 70 cm
1998	2 WALLS			papier-mâché, chicken wire, coasters, wood	220 x 190 x 44 cm and 210 x 170 x 70 cm
1990	SO THAT I CAN BUILD FOR HIM A HOUSE (2)			iron, stainless steel, text, motor with interval circuit, cable	51 x 56 x 105 cm
1994	ZONDER TITEL			hospital linen, parafinne, styrofoam, steel construction, rubber tubing	170 x 160 x 90 cm
1994	UNTITLED (ST.JOHN)			hospital linen, parafinne, styrofoam, steel construction, different types of rubber tubing	185 x 170x 90 cm
2017	Untitled	AkzoNobel Art Collection		photography	
1988	ZONDER TITEL	Stedelijk Museum Amsterdam	1988.4.0400	painting	26 x 156 x 2 cm
1991	ZONDER TITEL	Stedelijk Museum Amsterdam	1994.1.0223	aluminium, rubber tubing, caps	198 x 102 x 62 cm
1986	ZONDER TITEL	Museum Boijmans van Beuningen	3152 a-b (MK)	color photography on aluminium	155 x 50 x 4 cm
1992	ZONDER TITEL	Museum Boijmans van Beuningen	BEK 1663 (MK)	wood, rubber, steel, white gesso layer	120 x 140 x 80 cm
1989	Anaklasis	Rijksdienst voor het Cultureel Erfgoed and LIMA			
1984	Zonder titel geen geluid	Rijksdienst voor het Cultureel Erfgoed			
2016	The Same Sun				
2016	Miroir Noir			2 video projections on plexiglas	
2012	Fences and Pools			2-channel video installation with 3 soundtracks	
2014	Kitab al Manazir (Book of Optics)			3-channel video installation with 1 soundtrack	21 minutes
2014	KaM001				
2014	KaM002				
2014	KaM003				
2014	KaM200				
2014	KaM400				
2014	KaM1000				
2007	Convolution Kernel 4				
2001	Om vier uur in de ochtend			armature, papier-mâché, video projection	251 x 198 x 110 cm
2020	Mercurial Dominion			metal construction, disassembled iMac, video	140 x 276 x 93 cm
	I			photowork	122 x 176 cm
	Zonder titel			photowork	122 x 192 cm
	Unequal Times Measured by One Another				
1987	Forma Lucis II				
	Silicium				
	A New World				
	Unsusceptible				
	Observation				
	Herrnchiemsee, für Ludwig				
2018	Skin				
	Binary				
	Das Zeigende Zeigen				
2020	Ardalanish/Binary				
	Unequal Times Measured by One Another 2				
	assemble				
	1870				

== Exhibitions ==
=== Solo exhibitions ===
Non-exhaustive list of solo exhibitions:
Year	Title	Venue	City
1982	Experiments with smells ‘Greenish’	Stadsschouwburg	Maastricht
1988	Forma Lucis V	Gemeentemuseum	Arnhem
1988	Forma Lucis V	Galerie Van Gelder	Amsterdam
1994	Tumbled Over Rim	Museum Boijmans Van Beuningen	Rotterdam
1989		Galerie STAMPA	Basel
1989		Haags Centrum voor Actuele Kunst	Den Haag
1991	Sculptures	Kunstvereniging Diepenheim	Diepenheim
1998	Roos Theuws	Stedelijk Museum Bureau Amsterdam	Amsterdam
2006	Hazard Rate	Galerie RAM	Rotterdam
2008		Videolounge	Rotterdam
2009	Gaudeamus Muziekweek (in cooperation with VocaalLAB Nederland)	Muziekgebouw aan 't IJ	Amsterdam
2009	Cooperation with Jaqueline de Lucanet (Le merle Noir, Messiaen)	Muziekgebouw aan 't IJ	Amsterdam
2009	Art Amsterdam	RAI	Amsterdam
2014	Roos Theuws	Slewe Gallery	Amsterdam
2017	DUALs	Slewe Gallery	Amsterdam

=== Group exhibitions ===
Non-exhaustive list of group exhibitions:
Year	Title	Venue	City
1983	Time Based Arts		Amsterdam
1984	Festival International du Nouveau Cinema et de la Video		Montreal, Amsterdam, Zurich, Geneva
1984	Festival International de l'Art Video		Locarnp
1985	As far as Amsterdam goes....	Stedelijk Museum	Amsterdam
1985	Image on the Run (on tour)	The Kitchen	New York
1986	Videowochen im Wenkenpark	Videogenossenschaft Basel	Basel
1987	Contour	Museum Het Prinsenhof	Delft
1987	Forma Lucis III	Bonnefantenmuseum	Maastricht
1987	Forma Lucis IV	Museum Boijmans Van Beuningen	Rotterdam
1989	Vision and Revision	Danforth Museum	Boston
1989	Video-Skulptur: retrospektiv und aktuell 1963-1989	Kölnischer Kunstverein & Dumont Kunsthalle	Köln
1989	25 Jahre VideoSkulptur	Kongresshalle	Berlin
1990	Dutch Interiors	Biennale Tokyo	Tokyo
1990	IMAGO, fin de siècle in Dutch contemporary art	KunstRAI	Amsterdam
1990	IMAGO, fin de siècle in Dutch contemporary art	Video Art Festival de Locarno	Locarno
1991	IMAGO, fin de siècle in Dutch contemporary art	Hara Museum of Contemporary Art	Tokyo
1991	IMAGO, fin de siècle in Dutch contemporary art	Dom Kultúry	Bratislava
1991	IMAGO, fin de siècle in Dutch contemporary art	Műcsarnok	Budapest
1991	IMAGO, fin de siècle in Dutch contemporary art	Palau de la Virreina	Barcelona
1992	IMAGO, fin de siècle in Dutch contemporary art	Edifício da Alfândega	Porto
1993	IMAGO, fin de siècle in Dutch contemporary art	Taipei Fine Arts Museum	Taipei
1991	Poliset	Padiglione d'Arte Contemporanea	Ferrara
1991	Negen	Witte de With	Rotterdam
1991	9 artisti olandesi contemporanei	Centro per l'Arte Contemporanea Luigi Pecci	Prato
1991	10 junge Künstler aus den Niederlanden	Kunstverein für die Rheinlande und Westfalen	Düsseldorf
1992	Negen	Provinciaal Museum	Hasselt
1993	Right of Speech	Noordbrabants Museum	Den Bosch
1995	Triennale Kleinplastik 1995: Europa - Ostasien.	SüdwestLB Forum	Stuttgart
1996	De Muze als Motor	De Pont Museum	Tilburg
1999	Glad IJs	Stedelijk Museum	Amsterdam
2000		Galerie Gmurzynska	Köln
2002	Collectie Boijmans Van Beuningen	Museum De Lakenhal	Leiden
2002	Beelden in de Nieuwe Kerk	Stedelijk Museum	Amsterdam
2004	De 80-jaren	Bonnefantenmuseum	Maastricht
2007	2MOVE/ Migratory Aesthetics	Sala Verónicas and Centro Párraga	Murcia
2008	2MOVE/ Migratory Aesthetics	Zuiderzeemuseum	Enkhuizen
2008	2MOVE/ Migratory Aesthetics	Stenersen Museet	Oslo
2008	2MOVE/ Migratory Aesthetics	Solstice Arts Centre	Navan
2008	2MOVE/ Migratory Aesthetics	Belfast Exposed	Belfast
2008	Creatures from the Collection and Other Themes	Huis Marseille	Amsterdam
2008	Inertia	W139	Amsterdam
2010	Digital? Analogue!	Huis Marseille	Amsterdam
2011	Convolution Kernel 2	Galerie Paul Andriesse	Amsterdam
2020	Meanwhile...	Slewe Gallery	Amsterdam

== Artist books ==
Greenish (1983), loose leaves, 24 x 20 cm.

Binntal (2021), MunkenPolar paper, Glama paper, 84p, Swiss binding, (ZwaanLenoir) 29,5 x 21 cm.

== List of Literature ==
Alphen, Ernst van. “Slow Seeing. Grasping the Image and the Way We Process It.” Roos Theuws, 2014.

Alphen, Ernst van. “Traag kijken: beeldontleding door Roos Theuws.” De Witte Raaf, juli-augustus 2014.

Bal, Mieke. "Activating Temporalities: The Political Power of Artistic Time" Open Cultural Studies 2, no. 1 (2018): 84–102. https://doi.org/10.1515/culture-2018-0009

Bal, Mieke. “Roos Theuws.” Art in America, September 25, 2014. ARTnews.com.

Coelho, Nio, Possel, Rodrigo, Velthoven (1990). IMAGO, fin de siècle Dutch contemporary art. Amsterdam: Rijksdienst Beeldende Kunst/Stichting Mediamatic Foundation.

Fuchs, Rudi. “Stille aandacht.” De Groene Amsterdammer, September 14, 2016.

Massiac, Alix de. “40 Jaar Metropolis M – In gesprek met Roos Theuws.” Metropolis M, October 16, 2019. www.metropolism.com
