= Hafler Trio =

British performance art group

The Hafler Trio
- Also known as: h3o
- Origin: Newcastle upon Tyne, England
- Genres: Experimental, electronica, industrial, trip hop, musique concrete
- Years active: 1982–present
- Labels: Doublevision, Touch Music, Korm Plastics, Staalplaat, Important, Nextera, Soleilmoon, Die Stadt, Phonometrography
- Members: Andrew M. McKenzie
- Past members: Chris Watson

The Hafler Trio is an English conceptual, performance and sound art collaborative project. It was originally a duo formed in the early 1980s by Andrew McKenzie and Chris Watson. The third person in the 'trio' was a fictional scientist named Dr. Edward Moolenbeek. The Hafler Trio became the solo project of McKenzie (although often working with guest artists) with a strong focus on dadaesque sound art works and multimedia work. His recordings often having carefully and elaborately designed packaging. Chris Watson went on to a critically regarded career as a field recording artist and sound engineer.

Since, Andrew M. McKenzie's Hafler Trio project has seen the release of numerous albums and CDs in experimental musical styles ranging from electronic, cut-up, ambient, environmental soundscape, musique concrète, electro-acoustic, and audio-montage as cinema for the ears from 1982 to present, each of which use graphic design and text for contextual juxtaposition with the recordings, as well as having a diverse but concrete philosophical and sometimes quasi-religious framework to place them in.

== History ==
Despite the name, The Hafler Trio is essentially the work of one man, Andrew M. McKenzie, born in Scotland in 1963 and whose family moved to Newcastle upon Tyne shortly after. McKenzie released his first 7" single at the age of 16, having formed a post-punk rock group named Flesh.

There have been numerous members and collaborators alongside Andrew M. McKenzie, including Cabaret Voltaire co-founder Chris Watson, the fictitious Dr. Edward Moolenbeek, Steven Stapleton of Nurse With Wound, Adi Newton of Clock DVA, Z'EV, Fluxus artist Willem de Ridder, David Tibet (of Current 93), Genesis P-Orridge, Annie Sprinkle, Jónsi Birgisson (of Sigur Rós), Michael Gira (of Swans and Angels of Light), Chloe Vevrier, Erla Þórarinsdóttir, Blixa Bargeld, Netochka Nezvanova, Hilmar Örn Hilmarsson, Jóhann Jóhannsson, John Lacey of COUM Transmissions, and Autechre among many others. McKenzie was also part of Whitehouse along with Steven Stapleton and William Bennett for their first live performance.

In addition to the 6-part retrospective set released by The Grey Area of Mute Records titled The Golden Hammer (including many early LPs and EPs such as The Sea Org, "Bang" – An Open Letter, Three Ways of Saying Two, All That Rises Must Converge, Seven Hours Sleep, A Thirsty Fish and more), CD releases include: Intoutof, A Bag of Cats, Mastery of Money, How to Reform Mankind, with several notable stand-out collaborations: One Dozen Economical Stories by Peter Greenaway, Nurse With Wound and the Hafler Trio Hit Again! (collaboration with Nurse with Wound), Snuff (with Willem De Ridder), Soundtrack to Brion Gysin's 'Dreamachine' (which included detailed historical documentation and instructions for use), a substantial 2-part collaboration with Autechre, and most recently a three part collaboration with Jónsi Birgisson of Sigur Rós.

2009 saw the shutdown of the Brainwashed h3o website, the renunciation of conventional CD releases, almost all internet activity, and the exclusive concentration on methods of "complementary education" and related disciplines referenced by and developed in tandem with the work of The Hafler Trio since its inception, under the umbrella of Simply Superior.

== Selected body of audio work ==
- The Hafler Trio – An Introduction (1983, Cassette, ROBOL Sound Recordings (UK), white plastic wallet, cards, this is first release)
- "BANG" – An Open Letter (1984 LP, Re-issued on CD with extra material in 1994)
- Soundtrack To "Alternation, Perception, And Resistance" – A Comprehension Exercise (1985 12", Re-issued as part of the 1994 CD, "Walk Gently Through the Gates of Joy")
- Seven Hours Sleep (1985 Double LP, Re-issued on CD in 1994 and re-issued/re-mastered again on CD in 2006)
- Hotondo Kiki Torenai (1985 Cassette, Limited edition of 100)
- Brain Song (1986 12", Limited edition of 1000, Re-issued in 1987 as the A side of a split LP with Luciano Dari titled "Ben, Ruach, Ab, Shaloshethem, Yechad Thaubodo / Idrogeni Superiori", Re-issued again on CD with extra material as part of the 1994 CD, "All That Rises Must Converge" Some of the original material actually recorded by Ema Maynard now known as Ema Lea)
- Redintegrate (1986 Cassette, Re-issued on CD in 1991)
- The Sea Org (1986 10", Re-issued on CD with extra material as part of the 1994 CD, "All That Rises Must Converge" and re-issued/re-mastered again in 2004 on CD with completely different extra material under the original title of "The Sea Org")
- Three Ways of Saying Two (1986 LP, Re-issued on CD with extra material as part of the 1994 CD, "Four Ways of Saying Five")
- A Thirsty Fish (1987 Double LP, Re-issued on CD in 1994 with fewer tracks, then re-issued/re-mastered in full on Double CD in 2005)
- Dislocation (1987 Cassette, Re-issued on CD in 1990)
- Nurse With Wound and the Hafler Trio Hit Again! (with Nurse With Wound) (1987 Cassette, Re-issued on CD in 1995 under the title, "The Murray Fontana Orchestra Plays The Hafler Trio" in a limited edition of 1000)
- Untitled (with Thee Temple Ov Psychick Youth) (1987 Cassette, Limited edition of 100, somewhat re-issued on the 1989 release, "Present Brion Gysin's Dreamachine")
- Intoutof (1988 LP, Re-issued on Limited edition CD in 1990 and again in 1998)
- Ignotum per Ignotius (1989 CD, Re-issued/re-mastered in 2007)
- Present Brion Gysin's Dreamachine (with Thee Temple Ov Psychick Youth) (1989 LP and CD, larger scale re-issue of 1987 cassette, "Untitled")
- A Bag of Cats (1990 CD, Re-issued in 1992)
- Alaura/Slave Priest (1990 CD Single)
- Kuklos (1990 Cassette)
- Kill The King (1991 CD, Re-issued/re-mastered in 2003)
- Masturbatorium (with Annie Sprinkle) (1991 CD)
- The Hafler Trio Play The Hafler Trio (1991 CD)
- The Hafler Trio Play The Hafler Trio Play The Hafler Trio (1991 Cassette, Limited edition of 30)
- FUCK (1992 CD)
- Mastery of Money (1992 CD, Re-issued/re-mastered in 2004)
- Snuff (with Willem De Ridder) (1992 CD)
- Resurrection (with The Sons of God) (1993 CD)
- Walk Gently Through the Gates of Joy (1994 CD)
- Four Ways of Saying Five (1994 CD)
- All That Rises Must Converge (1994 CD)
- Designer Time (with Reptilicus) (1994 CD)
- How To Reform Mankind (1994 CD, Re-issued/re-mastered in 2004)
- Negentropy (1994 LP, Limited edition of 1000)
- One Dozen Economical Stories by Peter Greenaway (1994 CD)
- Unentitled (with Zoviet France and Jim O'Rourke) (1995 CD)
- An Utterance of the Supreme Ventriloquist (1996 LP, Limited edition of 451, then re-issued/re-mastered in 2005 on a CD limited to 1000 copies)
- I Was There/That Would Be (with Stilluppsteypa) (1996 7", Limited edition of 500)
- Infidelity to Reason (1996 7", Limited edition of 111)
- Right Here Where You Are Sitting Now (1996 7", Limited edition of 333)
- The Day I Married The World (1996 7", Limited edition of 479)
- Who Sees Goes On #1: Timerape (1997 10", Limited edition of 333, 111 of which are signed)
- Who Sees Goes On #2: Broadcast in White (1997 10", Limited edition of 333, 111 of which are signed)
- Who Sees Goes On #3: Lipchamber (1997 10", Limited edition of 333, 111 of which are signed)
- Who Sees Goes On #4: Godfood (1997 10", Limited edition of 333, 111 of which are signed)
- Who Sees Goes On #5: Solvitur Ambulado (1997 10", Limited edition of 333, 111 of which are signed)
- Who Sees Goes On #6: Dream Adjustments (1997 10", Limited edition of 333, 111 of which are signed)
- Who Sees Goes On #7: Avec Le Vide Les Pleins Pouvoirs (1997 10", Limited edition of 333, 111 of which are signed)
- Who Sees Goes On (1998 Boxed 10" Set with bonus CD titled "Hand Wave", Limited edition of 46, 25 without the original cover)
- Hljóðmynd (2000 CD, Limited edition of 1000)
- Cleave: 9 Great Openings (2002 CD)
- La Chanson Dada (2002 10", Limited edition of 500)
- A House Waiting For Its Master (2003 10", Limited edition of 400)
- A Small Child Dreams Of Voiding The Plague (2003 CD, Limited edition of 500, 100 of which come with a signed photo)
- æ³o & h³æ (with Autechre) (2003 Double CD)
- How To Slice A Loaf of Bread (2003 Triple CD, Limited edition of 500)
- Kisses With Both Hands From Gods Little Toy (2003 CD, Limited edition of 500, 100 of which come with a signed photo)
- No Man Put Asunder: 7 Fruitful and Seamless Unions (2003 CD, Limited edition of 1500)
- No More Twain, Of One Flesh: 11 Unequivocal Obsecrations (2003 CD, Limited edition of 1000)
- Normally (with Blixa Bargeld) (2003 Double CD, Limited edition of 500)
- The Birds Must Be Eliminated (2003 10", Limited edition of 500)
- The Man Who Tried To Disappear (2003 10", Limited edition of 500)
- The Moment When We Blow The Flour From Our Tongues (2003 10", Limited edition of 500)
- Untitled (with Ditterich Von Euler-Donnersperg) (2003 7", Limited edition of 500, 200 of which come with an additional 7" by Kontakt Der Jünglinge and Asmus Tietchens)
- Whistling About Chickens (2003, Double CD)
- "How To Slice A Loaf of Bread (Lengthwise)" (2004, Triple CD, Limited Edition of 500, volume two of the series)
- Anything That Anyone Else Tells You Is Not Good Enough (2004 12", Limited edition of 500)
- Where Are You? (with David Tibet) (2004 CD, A separate limited edition of 93 copies also exists)
- Exactly As I Say (with Jónsi Birgisson) (2004 CD, A separate limited edition of 111 copies also exists)
- I Never Knew That's Who You Thought You Were (2004 CD, Limited edition of 500, 100 of which come with a signed photo)
- Only The Hand That Erases Can Write The True Thing (2004 Double 10", Separate limited editions of 100 white vinyl and 500 clear vinyl)
- Scissors Cut Arrow (2004 Double CD with DVD (PAL), Limited edition of 500)
- The Concentrated Recapturing of Thought (2004 10", Limited edition of 500)
- Wolf Sheep Cabbage (Evidence Pertaining to the Destroyer) (2004 7", Limited edition of 333, the first 33 of which are signed)
- Wolf Sheep Cabbage (Evidence Pertaining to the Creator) (2004 7", Limited edition of 333, the first 33 of which are signed)
- Wolf Sheep Cabbage (Evidence Pertaining to the Preserver) (2004 7", Limited edition of 333, the first 33 of which are signed)
- Á Ég Að Halda Áfram? (2005 CD, Limited edition of 500, 100 of which come with a signed photo)
- æo³ & ³hæ (with Autechre) (2005 Double CD)
- Being A Firefighter Isn't Just About Squirting Water (2005 CD, Limited edition of 500, 100 of which come with a signed photo)
- Exactly As I Am (with Jónsi Birgisson) (2005 Double CD)
- Exactly As I Do (with Jónsi Birgisson) (2005 Double CD)
- If Take, Then Take: Tricks, Half-Tricks and Real Phenomena (2005 LP, Limited edition of 400)
- No One Remains (with Willem De Ridder) (2005 10" Boxed Set, Limited edition of 200)
- The Explanation (with Fovea Hex) (2005 CD, Limited edition of 300)
- The Water Has No Hair To Hold On To (2005 10", Limited edition of 500)
- 3 Eggs (with Colin Potter and Andrew Liles) (2006 CD, Limited edition of 1000)
- A Pressed on Sandwich (with Colin Potter) (2006 CD, Limited edition of 1010)
- The Discussion (with Fovea Hex) (2006 CD, Limited edition of 300)
- An Answer (with Fovea Hex) (2007 CD, Limited edition of 300)
- Who Gave You The Ability To Envisage Perfection? (2007 7", Limited edition of 333)
- ah³eo & ha³oe (with Autechre) (2011 Double DVD, 5.1 Audio, Limited edition of 1000)

== Selected writings ==
- Plucking Feathers From A Bald Frog (1991 Psychic Release Cerebrum and Press in Stockholm, A collection of Andrew M. McKenzie's texts from 1978 to 1991, Limited edition of 500)
- A Conversation Through A Sheet of Glass in an Empty Room (1990 Psychic Release Cerebrum and Press in Stockholm, A text in 11 parts from 1990, unknown edition)
- Just Because A Cat Has Her Kittens in the Oven Doesn't Make Them Biscuits (1992, Temple Press Limited in Brighton, UK, A film treatment in 31 scenes printed as part of a larger publication titled "Ratio 3/TransMediators" )

== McKenzie's medical condition ==
In 2004, Andrew announced that he was suffering from diagnosed hepatitis B and autoimmune hepatitis. Both of these conditions require drugs which McKenzie has stated he cannot afford.
