= Sjaron Minailo =

Israeli Dutch opera director

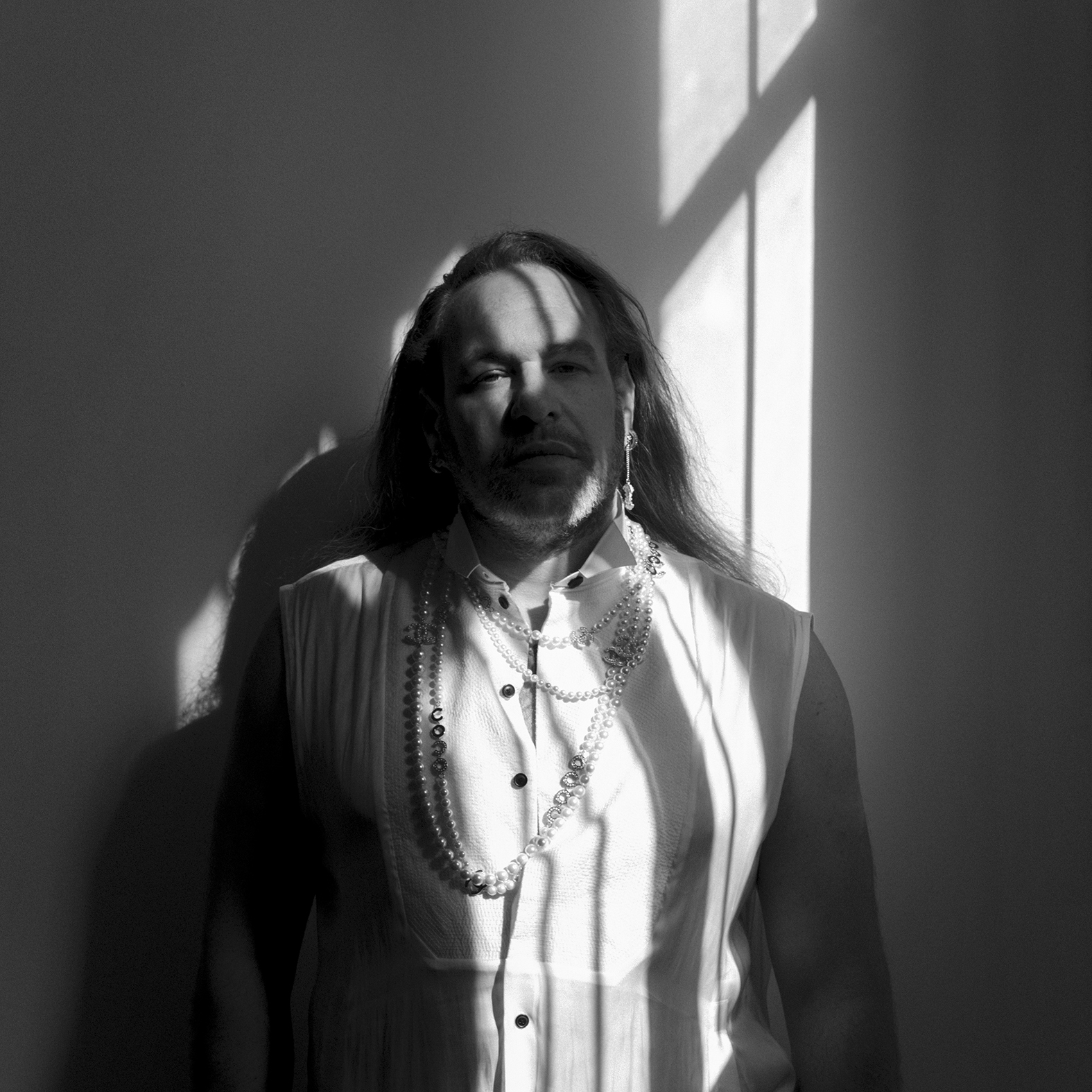

Background information
- Born: Arad, Israel
- Genres: Opera, music theatre
- Occupation: Stage director

Sjaron Minailo is a Dutch Israeli opera director. He is the founder of Studio Minailo, an Amsterdam based studio for experimental opera, working throughout Europe in opera houses such as La Monnaie, Dutch National Opera, Bergen National Opera and Opera Poznan.

== Early life ==
Minailo was born in 1979 in Arad, Israel, to Soviet Union immigrants. During his schooling in the Thelma Yellin High School for the Arts, he received initial training as an actor. After completing his graduation, Minailo joined the University of Amsterdam for BA and MA in Theatre Studies. During his time at the university, he created a theatre group with co-students to work on the musical theatre before switching to opera.

== Career in opera ==
After graduating, Minailo started working as a freelance director and was a director in residence for four years at the Dutch Chamber Opera House from 2008 to 2012. During that period and after, he has directed several music-theatre and opera production in commission or through his own studio. In 2016, he received a nomination in the Young Director category at 2016 International Opera Awards. In 2021 Minailo was appointed as Artist-Curator at the Opera Forward Festival of the Dutch National Opera where he is responsible for the OFF Labs.

== Teaching career ==
Minailo worked as a art tutor at Sandberg Institute, Amsterdam and a tutor at University of the Underground. He also work as a coach for young talents at Opera Forward Festival at the Dutch National Opera and Akademie voor Dans en Theater.

From 2022 to 2024 Minailo led a temporary programme at the Sandberg Institute, titled Re:master Opera.

In 2024 Minailo was appointed as artistic director of the music-theatre department at ArtEZ University of the Arts in Arnhem

== Works ==
Minailo's opera productions have included:

- Khadish, Israel, Germany, England and Belgium 2006
- Khadish I Erwartung, 2007
- A Prayer of The Heart, 2008
- Erwartung / Maeterlinck Lieder, 2008
- Elektra, 2009
- La Femme Humaine, 2009
- Gesprekken van de Ziel, 2009
- Exiles, 2009
- Elektra / Erwartung, 2010
- Amygdala, 2010
- De Cornet, 2010
- Saviour Sound, 2010
- A Stranger to Myself, 2010
- Container, 2011
- The Artist is Also Present, 2011
- Persona, based on the film by Ingmar Bergman 2011
- Dead class: Requiem, 2011
- Soul Seek (Internet Opera), 2012
- Traagheid, 2012
- The City Wears A Slouch Hat, 2012
- Nikola, 2012
- Pornographia, 2012
- Desired Constellations, 2013
- In Croce, 2013
- Victory Over The Sun, 2013
- Rothko Chapel, Morton Feldman, 2013
- Rothko Chapel Locations #2, 2014
- Alice, 2014
- Stars Like Sibilants Speak (music video), 2014
- Megalomania, 2014
- Mijn Liefste (music video), 2014
- Medulla, based on the album by Björk, 2015
- Semele, Händel, 2015
- Three Voices For Joan La Barbara, Morton Feldman 2015
- To Be Sung, Pascal Dusapin, 2016
- The Transmigration Of Morton F. (interactive Internet Opera), 2016
- In A Landscape, 2016
- Arariboy, 2016
- Before Present, 2016
- Tell Tale Heart, 2016
- Nachtschade: Aubergine, 2017
- Die Zauberflöte, Mozart 2017
- Tudo Aquilo Que Mais Eu Temia Desabou Sobre Minha Cabeça, 2017
- Soft Forces (music video), 2018
- Future Opera, 2018
- Commuter (music video), 2018
- Hippolyte et Aricie, Jean-Philippe Rameau 2019
- Il Diluvio Universale, Michelangelo Falvetti, 2019
- Little Girl (music video), 2019
- Retrotopia, 2019
- Intimate Letters, 2020
- Undine (Animation Opera), 2020/2021
- Eva - Spoken opera podcast, based on the book by Carry van Bruggen, 2021
- Korke & Gege, 2021
- Holle Haven, 2021
- The Arrival of Mr. Z, 2021. Composition by Meriç Artaç
- Notwehr, 2022. Composition by Annelies van Parys to Libretto by Gaea Schoeters. Commissioned by the Venice Biennale
- Lullaby, 2023. Composition by Kamala Sankaram to libretto by Guillermo Calderón, with Laura Bohn.
- SAM (Stop Annoying Me). 2024. By Dyane Donck company
- Losgezongen. 2025. With the Nederlands Kamerkoor and conducteur Ed Spanjaard
- Tarab, 2026. Based on the songs by Oum Kalthoum. Commissioned by the Neuköllner_Oper
