= N3krozoft Ltd =

Electronic art collective

N3krozoft Ltd aka N3krozoft Mord or N3kr0z0ft
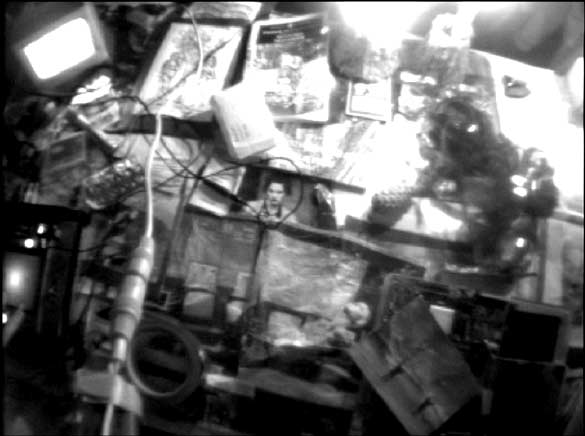
- N3krozoft Ltd live in Sofia (2004)
- Formation: 1990s
- Purpose: New media art Internet art
- Website: http://n3krozoft.com

N3krozoft Ltd /ˈnɛkroʊsɒft/, previously N3krozoft Mord or N3kr0z0ft, is a transnational electronic art group founded in the early 1990s. The group has experimented with the intersection of technology, information and arts, exploiting the creative potential of, what was then, the new media technologies of CD-ROM, multimedia, live audiovisual jamming, and computer-generated video installations.

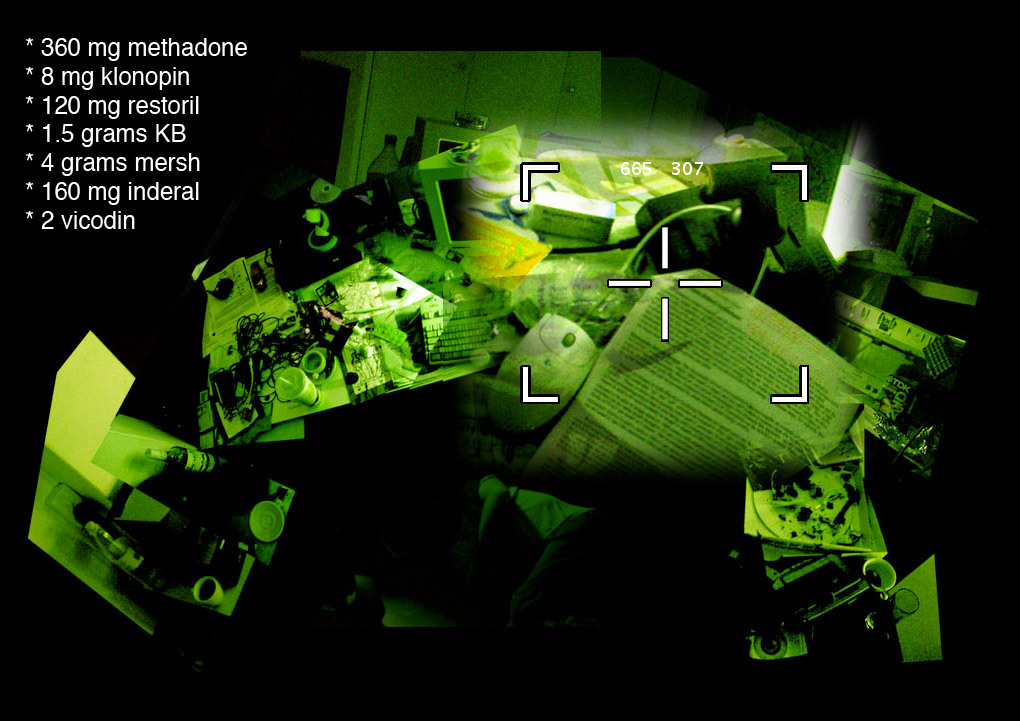
Imagery from the multimedia performance "LOL" (2004)

Their work has been exhibited widely in international festivals, such as Viper (Basel, 2003), April Meetings (Belgrade, 2004), read_me festival (Aarhus, 2004), Bucharest Biennale (Bucharest, 2006), Art+Communication 8 (Riga, 2006) , Sónar (Barcelona, 2008).

The group's name is a coinage that combines "necro-" with "Microsoft", thus linking information technology with death, the particular spelling relating both to l33t hacker-slang and kabbalistic numerology.

== Selected discography ==
- 10 Gigabit Ethernet Alliance (f0rkb0mb, 2003)
- T.A.T.Y. - The Remixes (f0rkb0mb, 2004)
- Dunkelziffer (Blutgift, 2004)
- Signal Processing Primitives (f0rkb0mb, 2005)
- Unequal Error Protection (f0rkb0mb, 2005)
- DoS Attack Blues (7-bit recs, 2006)
