= Netochka Nezvanova (author) =

Pseudonym used by the authors of NATO.0+55+3d

Netochka Nezvanova is the pseudonym used by the author(s) of nato.0+55+3d, a real-time, modular, video and multi-media processing environment. Alternate aliases include "=cw4t7abs", "punktprotokol", "0f0003", "maschinenkunst" (preferably spelled "m2zk!n3nkunzt"), "integer", and "antiorp". The name itself is adopted from the main character of Fyodor Dostoyevsky's unfinished novel Netochka Nezvanova (1849) and translates as "nameless nobody."

== Identity ==
Netochka Nezvanova has been described by cultural critics as "an elusive online identity" and "a collective international project". In 2020, art critic Amber Husain describes NN as an "avatar of avant-garde internet performance" that "became as known for her abstract and usable software artworks as she did for aggressive displays of anonymous cyber-domination".

In 2001, Netochka Nezvanova was named as one of the Top 25 Women on the Web by a San Francisco non-profit group.

In her article published March 2002 for online magazine Salon, Katharine Mieszkowki dubbed NN the "most feared woman on the Internet", and speculated on her real identity – "A female New Zealander artist, a male Icelander musician or an Eastern European collective conspiracy?".

Florian Cramer stated that NN "was a collective international project" that "presented itself as a sectarian cult, with its software as the object of worship". Cramer describes how the origin of NN's messages was obscured by "a web of servers and domain registrations spanning New Zealand, Denmark and Italy", while Mieszkowki observes that "e-mail from Netochka's various aliases has also been sent from ISPs in Chicago, New Zealand, Australia and Amsterdam".

In 2006, the Austrian Institut für Medienarchäologie (IMA) released a 20-minute documentary film, directed by Elisabeth Schimana, titled Rebekah Wilson a.k.a. Netochka Nezvanova. In this video documentary, Rebekah Wilson discusses her central role in the NN collective, disclosing how she legally changed her name to Netochka Nezvanova in 1999, before changing it back to her birth name in 2005.

== Software works ==
Besides the numerous software projects, her CD entitled "KROP3ROM||A9FF" was released by Decibel Records in 1997. A second CD entitled sin(x) was released by 0f0003 in 2000.

== Other software created by NN ==
- 0f0003 propaganda (1998) - this program algorithmically generates animated graphics and synthetic sounds.
- b1257+12 (1998) - a software for sound deconstruction and composition. The intricate operator interface allows for radical manipulation of soundloops in realtime, offering a large amount of control parameters which, every now and then, take a life of their own. The name of the software refers to a rapidly rotating neutron star, PSR B1257+12.
- @¶31®�≠ Ÿ (1998) - this software extracts random samples from a CD and creates a stochastical remix, accompanied by futuristic-looking graphics (according to the reference documents, it is intended for use with the krop3rom||a9ff release).
- m9ndfukc.0+99 and k!berzveta.0+2 (1999) - two programs written in Java interpreting network data, very likely preliminary versions of nebula.m81. In a 2018 interview, Andrew McKenzie describes m9ndfukc.0+99 as "a way to visualize, in a creative way, many different perspectives on the same data. It was basically a Java application in a browser".
- kinematek.0+2 (1999) - another Java application that performs "animated image generation from internet www data", incorporating parts of nebula.m81.
- nebula.m81 (1999) - an experimental web browser written in Java, rendering HTML code into abstract sounds and graphics. Awarded at the International Music Software Competition in Bourges 1999 and at Transmediale 2001 (first prize in the category "Artistic Software"). Described by jury member Florian Cramer as "an experimental web browser that turned browsing into something resembling measurement data evaluation".
- !=z2c!ja.0+38 (1999) - an application that generates a dense visual texture based on the user's keyboard input. It (ab)uses Mac OS' QuickDraw capability and can therefore be seen as a preliminary step towards nato.0+55.

== Musical works ==
- "krop3ropm||a9ff", audio CD, Decibel Records, 1997 (re-released by 0f0003 in 1998, with additional material by The Hafler Trio).
- "A9FF" (1997), a piece for tape by Rebekah Wilson, performed at Victoria University of Wellington in February 1998.
- "8'|sin.x(2^n)", hybrid CD containing audio and mp2 data tracks (1999, self-produced).
- Trilogy of theatre pieces in collaboration with vocalist Ayelet Harpaz, based on haikus by the Japanese poet Masaoka Shiki ("Two Autumns", "I Keep Asking How Deep The Snow's Gotten"; "Spring: Still Unfurled"; presented in Utrecht, Amsterdam and Moscow, 2001–2002).
- "Poztgenom!knuklearporekomplekz", included on the CD Strewth! An Abstract Electronic Compilation, published in 2002 by the Australian record label Synaesthesia.
- "La lumière, la lumière .. c'est la seule .." (2002), for viola, piano, percussion and electronics. Commissioned by Ensemble Intégrales, performed in Ireland, Belgium, Switzerland, Austria and Germany (2003–2005).
- "A History of Mapmaking" or "Aerial Photography and 31 Variations on a Cartographer's Theme", for amplified cello and light controller, composed and performed by Rebekah Wilson. Performances in Auckland (Transacoustic Festival 2005), Ljubljana (City of Women 2006 Festival), Berlin (Transmediale 2007), Linz (Ars Electronica 2007).

== See also ==
- Decoder (film)
