= Ivo van Emmerik =

Dutch composer

Ivo van Emmerik (born 1961 in Amsterdam, North Holland) is a Dutch composer.

Ivo van Emmerik lives and works in Zwolle, where he teaches twentieth-century music at the Arnhem/Zwolle School of Music (ArteZ Institute of the Arts).

He studied composition with Robert Heppener at the Sweelinck Conservatory in Amsterdam and Brian Ferneyhough at the Royal Conservatory in The Hague. He attended summer courses in Middelburg given by Morton Feldman and John Cage that were of great importance to his musical development.

In 1989 he completed, with honors, his studies in The Hague. Since then, his work has been performed regularly in the Netherlands as well as in other European countries (such as Germany, Russia, Italy).

He wrote for such ensembles and soloists as the Nieuw Ensemble, orchestra 'de ereprijs', Percussiongroup The Hague, Trio Dolce, pianist Anthony de Mare and Ensemble Kontext Basel.

His composition Thought for three soloists and orchestra (1990), written for the Residentie Orkest, was premiered during the 1991 Holland Festival by Het Trio (Harry Sparnaay, Harrie Starreveld and René Eckhardt) as soloists, Hans Vonk and Alexandru Lascae conducting.

A close association with the Ives Ensemble resulted in a number of large scale works such as Documents pour servir de canevas (1990–1992) a 45-minute cycle of six compositions for ensembles of between three and nine musicians and Birdstone (1998) a composition for two instrumental groups.

Since the mid-1990s spatial elements often come to the fore in Van Emmerik's work, for instance in De Leesmachine A-D (1994), a multi-media composition realized in collaboration with photographer and film-maker Frank Zweers and painter Ellie van der Meer. In this work not only the musicians are placed in two spatially separated groups, but also images and texts are projected into various points in space.

His orchestral work Ventriloquist (1996–1997), dedicated to his former teacher Robert Heppener, was performed for the first time in 1996 by the Nederlands Kamerorkest with Ed Spanjaard conducting, and it was repeated the following year under Lucas Vis at the occasion of a concert to celebrate the fiftieth anniversary of Donemus.

In 1999 he was one of the first Dutch composers who, in close collaboration with visual artists, wrote a work for CD-Rom: Als een gelaat van zand bij de grens der zee (1998–1999), a work which has been performed many times in the Netherlands.

As artistic advisor of the Prime Foundation Groningen he was involved between 1990 and 2002 in organizing festivals around internationally renowned composers such as Morton Feldman (1991), John Cage (1992), Dieter Schnebel (1993), Christian Wolff (1994), Luc Ferrari (1995), Henry Brant (1997), George Crumb (2000) and Wolfgang Rihm (2001).

His music was performed during the following international festivals:

- Eerste Internationale Blokfluitweek (Amsterdam, 1988)
- Festival Nieuwe Muziek Zeeland (Middelburg, 1988)
- Nederlandse Muziekdagen (Utrecht, 1989 & 1990)
- Ferienkurse für Neue Musik (Darmstadt, 1990)
- Off Holland Festival (Amsterdam, 1990)
- Nuove Sincronie (Milaan, 1990)
- Holland Festival (Amsterdam and Den Haag, 1991)
- Music Biennale Zagreb (1991)
- But What About the Noise... (Groningen, 1992)
- Visual Minds (Groningen, 1994)
- Tweede Internationale Accordeonweek (Amsterdam, 1995)
- Gaudeamus Vertolkers Concours (Rotterdam, 1996)
- Animato Festival (Rome, 1996)
- Festival SpatioMusica (Cagliari, Sardinia, 1998)
- Terry Riley Festival (Groningen, 2002)
- Transit Festival (Leuven, 2004)
