= Dorothea Winter =

German musician and teacher (1949-2012)

Dorothea Angelika Winter (November 27, 1949 – November 11, 2012) was a German recorder player and recorder teacher. She taught recorder at the Conservatory of Zwolle, Maastricht and at the Royal Conservatory in The Hague. She was a founder and a member of Trio Dolce. John Cage wrote "Three" for Trio Dolce.

== Biography ==
Dorothea Winter was born in Ahrensburg (Germany) on November 27, 1949. After her graduation at Stormarnschule in 1968 she studied recorder with Ferdinand Conrad in Hannover. While being a recorder student in Germany she played many concerts in Europe under the pseudonym of Theodora Sommer.

She moved to Holland, where she studied recorder with Jeanette van Wingerden and Frans Brüggen at the Royal Conservatory in The Hague. She obtained her Degree in Performance with honors and won several prizes at the International Competition for Woodwinds at the Early Music Festival in Bruges. In 1986 she founded, together with recorder players Christine Brelowski and Geesche Geddert, Trio Dolce, a recorder trio specialized in contemporary recorder music. Composers who wrote music for Trio Dolce include: Lothar Lämmer (Pfeif drauf!, 1985), Ivo van Emmerik (Voci eguali, 1986; Renvoi à l'environ, 1993), John Cage (Three, 1989), Ron Ford (Steps, 1990), Floris van Manen (Langzaam & zacht, 1993), and Walter Zimmermann (Shadows of Cold Mountain I, 1993). Three, by John Cage, is a piece for three recorder players using sopranino, soprano, alto, tenor (recorder player 1), sopranino, soprano, alto, basset, tenor, bass (recorder player 2), and soprano, alto, basset, tenor, double bass (recorder player 3). It was first performed by Trio Dolce on July 27, 1990, at the Internationale Ferienkurse für Neue Musik Darmstadt. Dorothea was also a member of The Klemisch Consort Berlin.

Dorothea was a recorder teacher at the Conservatory of Zwolle, the Conservatory of Maastricht and at the Royal Conservatory in The Hague.

== Discography ==
- Trio Dolce. John Cage: The Number Pieces 4. Three. Solo with Obbligato Accompaniment. Mode Records (mode 186), 2007.
- Klemisch Consort Berlin. En vos adieux. Musik der Renaissance aus Rom und Florenz. Musik auf historischen Blockflöten, 2010.
