= Institute of Sonology =

Center for electronic music in The Hague, Netherlands

The Institute of Sonology is an education and research center for electronic and computer music based at the Royal Conservatoire of The Hague in the Netherlands.

== Background ==
The institute was founded at Utrecht University in 1960 as the Studio for Electronic Music (STEM), as a successor to the former studio for electronic music at Philips' NatLab in Eindhoven. In 1964, Gottfried Michael Koenig became the studio's artistic director. The studio grew under Koenig's leadership, and in 1967 an annual international electronic music course was founded which exists to this day.

In 1967 STEM was renamed as the "Institute of Sonology". International attention increased in 1971 with the purchase of a PDP-15 minicomputer which was used to develop programs for algorithmic composition and digital sound synthesis. During the early years of the institute, a series of landmark programs were developed there, including Koenig's Project 1, Project 2, and SSP, Paul Berg's PILE, Werner Kaegi's MIDIM/VOSIM, and Barry Truax's POD. In 1971 the Brazilian composer Jorge Antunes, a precursor of electronic music in his country, was a student at the Institute where he composed the work "Para Nascer Aqui".

In 1986, the institute was moved to the Royal Conservatoire of The Hague, hosting the International Computer Music Conference there during its inaugural year.

Current research focuses on algorithmic composition, live electronic music, historical reconstructions of electronic and computer music (including György Ligeti's Pièce électronique Nr. 3 and Edgard Varèse's Poème électronique), field recording, sound installations, and sound spatialization. Alongside the annual one-year course, the institute offers bachelor's and master's degrees in Sonology.

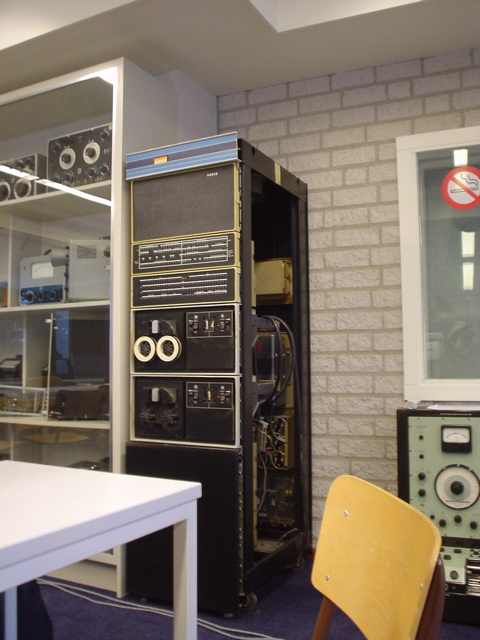
The remnants of the Institute of Sonology's PDP-15 minicomputer on display

== Discography ==
- Gottfried Michael Koenig – The Electronic Works (1990) BV Haast
- His Master's Noise (2001) BV Haast
- Kees Tazelaar – Electronic compositions (2004) Near
- Institute of Sonology: Early Electronic Music 1959–1969 (2009) Sub Rosa
- Anthology of Dutch Electronic Tape Music, vols. 1 and 2 (1979) Composer's Voice

== Notable teachers and alumni ==
- Clarence Barlow
- Jorge Antunes
- Richard Barrett
- Paul Berg
- Konrad Boehmer
- Nuno Canavarro
- Marie Guilleray
- Edwin van der Heide
- Werner Kaegi
- Roland Kayn
- Gottfried Michael Koenig
- Igor Lintz Maués
- Shin Mizutani
- Fred Momotenko
- Jean Piché
- Kees van Prooijen
- Dick Raaijmakers (also taught at the Royal Conservatoire's studio for electronic music)
- Peter Struycken
- Barry Truax
- Henry Vega
- Claude Vivier
- Rodney Waschka II
- Amnon Wolman
