= Paul Berg (composer) =

Dutch composer

Paul Berg was a professor of music and specialist in algorithmic composition at the Institute of Sonology at the Royal Conservatory of The Hague. He is the author of the AC Toolbox.
