= Igor Lintz Maués =

Braziiian composer (born 1955)

Igor Lintz Maués; also spelled Igor Lintz-Maues; is a composer and sound artist born December 8, 1955, in São Paulo, Brazil, and since the end of the 1980s living in Vienna, Austria.

== Biography ==
He studied composition, Electroacoustic and Computer Music in São Paulo (USP), The Hague (Royal Conservatory), Utrecht (Institute of Sonology) and Vienna (University of Music and Performing Arts) with Willy Correa de Oliveira, Gilberto Mendes, Louis Andriessen, Gottfried Michael Koenig and Wilhelm Zobl. His master's thesis, "Música Eletroacústica no Brasil (1956-1981)", is a reference work about the pioneering years of the Brazilian electroacoustic music.

During the 1980s he was lecturer at the São Paulo State University (UNESP), where he also directed the Laboratory of Electroacoustic Music. In 1991 he joined the University of Music and Performing Arts, Vienna (Institute ELAK), where he has been associate professor of Electroacoustic and Experimental Music since 2002.

From 1995 to 2000 he was president of the Austrian Society of Electroacoustic Music (GEM). His book, "Acustica-Elektronische Frühling/ Dokumentation elektroakustischer Musik in Österreich" (1995, together with Gerald Trimmel), documents the situation of the Austrian electroacoustic music during the 1980s and the 1990s.

From 1997 to 2002 he directed the composer's forum of the ISMEAM - "International Summer Meeting of Electroacoustic Music" in Sárvár, Hungary. From 1998 to 2000 he was artistic director of the festival "Elektrokomplex" in Vienna and Linz as well as from 2003 to 2009 of the concert series "Klangprojektionen" in Vienna. In 1999 he founded the "Vienna Noise Orchestra", of which he is member.

He was a guest composer at Latin American and European studios and his music has been performed in numerous international concerts. He has received diverse awards for his work.

For the last years he suffers from Parkinson's disease, nevertheless remains active.

== List of works (selected) ==
- "Die flüchtige Evidenz" ("The Ephemeral Evidence", 2012), viola and electronics
- "Pour Annette" (2011), loudspeaker orchestra
- "Ad multos annos" (“Anniversary Overture”, 2009), orchestra
- "Loslassen" ("Let It Go", 2007), sound installation
- "Schenk mir dein Ohr" ("Lend Me Your Ears", 2006), loudspeaker orchestra
- "Sieben" ("Seven", 2005), percussion and electronics
- "Ein Ruheraum im Gebirge/Wellen" ("A Relaxation Area in the Mountains/Waves", 2003), sound installation
- "Crater Music" (2002), loudspeaker orchestra
- "Kadenz" ("Cadence", 2001), chamber orchestra and electronics
- "Concert for Electric Quartet and Noise Orchestra" (2001)
- "The Voice of the Guarani" (2000), performance, installation and radio art
- "Der Kuss" ("The Kiss", 1999), ensemble and electronics
- "Allein" ("Alone", 1995), guitar
- "Umformung" ("Transformation", 1994), loudspeaker orchestra
- "Triflauto" (1994), flute and UPIC (electronic sounds)
- "Trugklang" (1993), viola and electronics
- "Jede Frau trägt einen Schrei" ("Each Woman Carries a Cry", 1991), trombone and multimedia
- "Tropical Birds in the Pet Shop" (1991), loudspeaker orchestra
- "Durch unsre Stadt zum Tor hinaus" (1990), loudspeaker orchestra
- "Früher gab es keine Welt" ("Formerly there was no world", 1989), loudspeaker orchestra
- "Epifania - Draft II about shouting and extermination" (1987–88), loudspeaker orchestra
- "Muirte claus - to the memory of the victims of AIDS" (1983–85), voice and electronics
- "Another View of Delft" (1982), flute

== Recordings ==
- "Coletânea de Música Eletroacústica Brasileira" (CD SBME 007, 2009)
- "ISMEAM '97" (CD HEAR 103, 1997)
- "Música Eletroacústica Brasileira" (CD RioArte Digital RD003, 1995)
- CD audio-appendix of "Sampling" (ed. Mathias Fuchs et. alt., University of Applied Arts Vienna, ISBN 3-85211-044-0, 1995)
- "Premê Alegria dos Homens" (Eldorado CD ELD 7078, 1991)
- "El Ak Mu" (HA HA Soundwave CD 1015, 1989)
- "Grande Coisa" (LP EMI-Odeon 31C 062 421277, 1986)
