= Johannes Bernardus van Bree =

Dutch composer, violinist and conductor

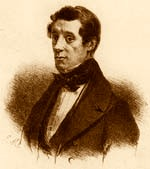
Johannes Bernardus van Bree

Johannes Bernardus van Bree (29 January 1801 – 14 February 1857) was a Dutch composer, violinist and conductor.

== Biography ==
Van Bree was born and died in Amsterdam. He was a pupil of Jan George Bertelman.

From 1829 to the year of his death he directed the Felix Meritis Society. He was also the director of the Music School of the Society of the Promotion of Music, Amsterdam.

As a conductor he gave the Dutch premieres of Berlioz' Symphonie fantastique (in 1855) and Richard Wagner's Faust Overture (1856).

== Incomplete list of works ==
- Operas
  - Sappho
  - Nimm dich in Acht
  - Le Bandit (overture recorded on NM Classics)
- Choral and Vocal Works
  - Mass for Soloists, Mixed Chorus and Orchestra in A flat (ca. 1830)
  - Mass for Two-Part Chorus and Organ in F
  - Three Masses "tribus vocibus humanis, comitante organo" for Three-Part Male Chorus and Organ (1837)
  - Cantata "St. Cecilia's Day" (in D)
  - Psalm 84 (1840s?)
- Orchestral and Chamber works
  - Overture in B minor
  - Overture in E flat major (1839)
  - Scene, for Horn and Orchestra (1841)
  - Variations for violin and piano (1837)
  - Violin Concerto in D minor
  - Fantasy in form of a symphony (1845)
  - Allegro for Four String Quartets in D minor (about 1845)
  - Scherzi, for the piano (about 1855?)
  - String Quartets - no. 1 in A minor (about 1834), no. 2 in E flat (about 1840, dedicated to Bernhard Molique), no. 3 in D minor (ca. 1848).
