= Dina Appeldoorn =

Dutch musician (1884–1938)

Christina Adriana Arendina (Dina) Koudijs-Appeldoorn (26 December 1884 in Rotterdam, the Netherlands – 4 December 1938 in The Hague) was a Dutch composer and pianist whose works, such as her two symphonic poems Noordzee-symfonie and Volkfeest, were written in the Romantic style. She also had a predilection for programme music, as is evidenced by her four movement suite Woudsproke.

Her works for amateur singers and choruses have been described as energetic. In them, Appeldoorn used simple tonal melodies and set the texts predominantly syllabically. In contrast, her accompaniments show a spicy harmonic language filled with dissonances which illustrate the text, such as in Frissche bloemen.

== Biography ==
Dina Appeldoorn attended the Royal Conservatory of The Hague, where she studied composition under F.E.A. Koeberg and later with Johan Wagenaar. The later would become a close friend whom she would continue to consult throughout her life. She graduated the conservatory in 1910, at which time twenty of her songs had already been published. Her early work met with mixed reviews from Dutch music critics with some pieces, like Frissche bloemen, getting better reviews than others. Appeldoorn would later become a piano teacher at the Royal Conservatory of The Hague.

After her studies, Appeldoorn began her career as a piano accompanist for various choirs in The Hague. Ultimately, though, she found herself drawn more toward her composition background. Many of her early songs were first performed by a quintet she founded with the soprano Lena van Diggelen. Other singers who have performed her work include Julie de Stuers, who gave several recitals outside of the Netherlands featuring Dutch composers. Appeldoorn dedicated her Vondel-liederen to Stuers.

The Utrecht City Orchestra debuted her first major work, the symphonic poem Pêcheurs d’Islande, in 1912. In 1923, one of her compositions was awarded a prize by the Nederlandsche Volkszang-bond in Utrecht. This was Jubileum-lied, which she wrote for Queen Wilhelmina of the Netherlands’ 25th anniversary. In 1925, the Utrecht City Orchestra premiered another one of her works, her Noordzee-symfonie. Throughout the 1920s, Appeldoorn also wrote choral works for the popular community singing evenings in The Hague of the Nederlandse Vereniging voor den Volkszang, conducted by Arnold Spoel. Some of her choral works were also performed by Die Haghe Sanghers in the 1930s, such as Het Zwervers' Lied. In 1934, she found a fan in Eduard Flipse, who was then conductor of the Rotterdam Philharmonic Orchestra. He promoted her work in the music community and his orchestra performed her work the Blijspel-ouverture. Appeldoorn also became involved with the Esperanto movement in the 1930s and wrote a large number of songs in the constructed language. She was also known for writing patriotic works, such as the Hollansche Overture and Loflied aan Nederland.

== Selected works ==
=== Symphonies ===
Symphony no.1 (Meisymfonie) (1915)
Symphony no.2 (1916)
Noordzee-symfonie (1924)

=== Other orchestral pieces ===
Scherzo (1909)
Dance (1912)
Pêcheurs d’Islande (1912)
Woudsproke (1915)
Hollandsche Overture (1917)
Adeste, fidelis (1918)
Carnaval (1919)
Natuursuite (1919)
Blijspel-oeverture (1934)
Pastorale (1934)
Serenade (1936)

=== Vocal ===
Frissche bloemen (6 songs) (1909)
2 Hollandsche Liederen (1911)
Omhoog (1912)
Loflied aan Nederland (1922)
Jubileum-lied (1923)
De lente luwt (1923)
3 liederen (1925)
6 kantoj (1931)
Julianalied (1936)
Het Zwerver's Lied (1936)
De kalkoen (1938)

=== Chamber and solo Instrument ===
2 Hollandse Dansen (1920)
Divertissemento (1921)
Serenade (1922)
Haagssch liedje (1925)
Sonatine (1925)
2 Preludes (1932)
String Quartet in B flat (1932)

=== Children's operetta ===
Duinsprookje (1927)
