= Shin Mizutani =

Japanese contemporary music composer

- 水谷 晨
- Born: December 3, 1991 (age 34)

Shin Mizutani (Japanese: 水谷 晨; born December 3, 1991) is a Japanese contemporary music composer. He completed the Master's Program in Music at the Graduate School of Music, Toho Gakuen School of Music. He studied under Richard Barrett and others, and pursued studies at the Codarts University for the Arts and the Institute of Sonology at the Royal Conservatory of The Hague. In 2018, Mizutani was awarded a prize at the International Composition Competition "Città di Udine", with the result reported in the Italian newspaper Il Friuli. In 2022, Mizutani presented a portrait concert commemorating the Great East Japan Earthquake. The event was reviewed by musicologist Minoru Nishihara in the Japanese music magazine Ongaku Gendai.

== Publications ==
His works are published by Donemus.

== Awards ==
- 1st Prize, Solo and Ensemble Composition Category, 12th Concorso Internazionale di Composizione "Città di Udine" (Italy)
- 2nd Prize, 4th Sergey Slonimsky International Composition Competition (Russia)
- 2nd Prize, Category A, International Competition for Young Musicians, Città di Barletta (Italy)
- 1st Prize, Category B, International Competition for Young Musicians, Città di Barletta (Italy)
- 3rd Prize, Category C, International Competition for Young Musicians, Città di Barletta (Italy)
- Special Mention, Andrea Celarso Rome Prize (Italy)
- Finalist, Luciano Berio International Composition Competition (Italy)
- Runner-up, Dimitri Mitropoulos International Composition Competition (Greece)
