= Clara Wildschut =

Dutch composer, pianist and violinist

Clara Wildschut (11 June 1906 – 27 August 1950) was a Dutch composer, pianist and violinist born in Deventer. She studied music at the Royal Conservatory of the Hague with Johan Wagenaar, E. van Beinum, André Spoor and F. Broer van Dijk. In 1930, she won a state scholarship for composition. She studied composition with Joseph Marx in Vienna and returned to Amsterdam in 1937.

== Works ==
Her compositions include:

=== Chamber ===
- Serenade (woodwind quintet)
- Sonata (violin and piano)
- Sonatina (violin and piano)
- String Quartet
- Two Sonatines (oboe and piano; one arranged for oboe and orchestra)

=== Orchestra ===
- Entrata Capricciosa
- Fuga en Romance (string orchestra)
- Kleine Suite (1943)
- Concertino for Oboe and Orchestra

=== Piano ===
- Theme with Twelve Variations and Fugue

=== Vocal ===
- over 70 songs (voice and piano)
- some a capella music for choir
