= Jean Piché =

Canadian composer (born 1951)

Jean Piché (born 1951 in Trois-Rivières, Quebec) is a Canadian composer and video artist.

Piché studied electroacoustic and computer music at Simon Fraser University with Barry Truax and at the Institute of Sonology in the Netherlands. He has taught electroacoustic composition in the Faculty of Music at the University of Montreal since 1988. Since the early 1990s, Piché has focused on the creation of hybrid compositions involving abstract moving images which he calls "videomusic". As a software developer, Piché is the author of a Csound frontend called Cecilia, and the Tam Tam suite for the One Laptop Per Child project’s XO computer.

Though Piché has worked in multi-channel environments, his focus resides in "expanding" sound boundaries by using video. Piché's students are known to explore visual space (visual sound in space) through sound installations. These types of performance installations often consist of re-configurable walls, 3D, movable objects, and other structures. Frustrated by the "bounds" of the screen, Piché attempted to "multiply" screens to expand the "space" of the image. In doing so, Piché attempted to produce individual experiences in each extended screen.
