= Werner Kaegi (composer) =

Swiss electronic music composer (1926–2024)

Background information
- Born: Werner Kaegi; 17 June 1926; Uznach, in the St. Gallen canton, Switzerland
- Died: 16 March 2024 (aged 97) Aubais, France
- Genres: electroacoustic, acousmatic, classical, electronic
- Occupations: composer, educator, musicologist, software developer

Werner Kaegi (17 June 1926 – 16 March 2024) was a Swiss electronic composer, musicologist and educator. During the 1960s, he promoted electronic music in his home country. In the 1970s, as a composer and researcher at Utrecht's Institute of Sonology, The Netherlands, he developed pioneering programs in the field of computer-generated music.

== Early life ==
Kaegi was born in Uznach, in the St. Gallen canton, on 17 June 1926, as the third child of Heinrich Kaegi and Clara Kaegi-Schlaepfer. In their parental home he came into contact with classical music literature at an early age because a lot of music was being played at home. His father in particular was a passionate amateur violinist. His sister played excellent piano, and his brother played violin, viola and flute. The young Werner soon proved able to arrange pieces for the house concerts. From six years he received clarinet and piano lessons.

He studied mathematical logic and music in Zürich, Heidelberg and Basel, and music composition in Zürich, Basel, Salzburg and Paris. His music teachers have included composers Paul Hindemith, Arthur Honegger and Louis Aubert. In 1951, blending his interests for mathematics and music, he received his doctorate with a study of the structure of Johann Sebastian Bach's Inventions and Fugues.

Kaegi discovered Pierre Schaeffer, musique concrète and the GRM radio broadcasts in Paris in 1951, yet his 1950s compositions are for traditional instruments; Ariadne in Zürich is for clarinet and piano 4 hands, Miniaturen, for oboe, bassoon and cimbalom, while the 1956 Sonate is for clarinet and piano. During the next decade, however, Werner Kaegi embraced electronic music and became a pioneer of Swiss electroacoustic music, predating other composers in the field, such as Bruno Spoerri and Rainer Boesch.

== At Centre de Recherches Sonores (1963–1970) ==
From 1963 to 1970, Kaegi worked at the Centre de Recherches Sonores, the electroacoustic music studio of Radio Suisse Romande in Geneva. There he started composing electronic and tape music, including pieces such as Éclipses (1964), L'Art de la Table (1964), and Entretiens (1965). At the C.R.S., Kaegi created several radiophonic works; such as La Porte Noire in 1964 and Zéa in 1965. In the late 1960s, Kaegi wrote several essays on electronic music, including the influential book Was ist elektronische Musik?, ("What Is Electronic Music?"), which was published in 1967 in Zurich, Switzerland, and also became a film for Swiss television.

This period of electronic music championing culminated in 1971 with the publication of Kaegi's unique record release, a 7-inch record titled Von Sinuston zur elektronischen Musik ("From Sine Wave to Electronic Music"). In the 12 pages accompanying booklet, Kaegi analyses the basic constituents of electronic music like sine wave, sound synthesis, ring modulation or electronic oscillator, with sound examples provided on the disc as well as excerpts from his most recent works of the time, Kyoto, 1970, Thai Clarinet, 1970, Hydrophonie I, 1969 and Illumination Expo'70 Osaka, 1969. The latter piece was commissioned by the Swiss government to be used as background music for the Swiss pavilion at the World Expo '70 in Osaka, Japan, a project he undertook with composer and contemporary music promoter André Zumbach (born 1931), then head of music at Radio Suisse Romande.

== At Instituut voor Sonologie (1971–1987) ==
In 1969, Kaegi was invited to compose at Utrecht's Institute of Sonology, formerly known as STEM, in The Netherlands, where he created the tape music of Hydrophonie I. Owing to a grant from the Swiss government, he permanently relocated to The Netherlands in 1971 to work at the Institute and soon became a member of the board of directors. At the Institute, Kaegi worked as a composer, researcher and teacher in the field of electronically generated music and composition – his students have among others included Benno Ammann, Lasse Thoresen, Jos Janssen, Cort Lippe, Kathleen St John, Trevor Batten, Maarten In 't Veld, Martin Supper, Peter Pabon, Kees van Prooijen. After Floris van Maanen the Canadian composer Paul Goodman, born 1955, became his assistant in the 1980s.

Between 1973 and 1978, together with Dutch researcher Stan Tempelaars (1938–2010), Kaegi developed the VOSIM program. VOSIM, which stands for VOice SIMulator, is a system based on the digital sound synthesis of simple, sinusoidal square waves, allowing the modeling of vowel sounds, vocal fricatives and quasi-instrumental tones. It complemented, and was used in conjunction with, Gottfried Michael Koenig's own computer-generated music programs Project 1 (1964), Project 2 (1966) and SSP (1971). Werner Kaegi summed up the VOSIM system in 1986 in a presentation for the scientific journal Interface.

In 1987, Kaegi was awarded a prize at the 15th Bourges international electroacoustic competition, in Bourges, France, for his piece Ritournelles, for soprano and VOSIM software. He apparently ceased teaching and composing after 1987.

== Death ==
Kaegi died in Aubais, France on 16 March 2024, at the age of 97.

== Notable compositions ==
- Lieder (Marienlieder, Für Lilly, Verschwiegene Liebe, Zwei Lieder für Sopran und Klavier, Ramona) with lyrics by Joseph Von Eichendorff, Christian Morgenstern, Theodor Storm, Ludwig Uhland und Hermann Hesse (1943-1944, 1956, revidiert 2018)
- Vom Leben und Sterben des Hirten Kaedmon, oratorio for mixed choir and orchestra (1952)
- Valses affectives, for piano (1952)
- Miniaturen, for oboe, bassoon and cimbalom (1959)
- Magna Voce Ad Dominum Clamo, for singer and orchestra (1967)
- Lieder für die neuapostolische Kirche, songs for choir (1948–54)
- Sonate, for clarinet and piano (1957) Schott Edition
- Ariadne in Zürich, for clarinet and piano 4 hands (1957) Schott Edition
- De bach chuunt, Music for Ballet, Choreography Irene Roth (1958)
- Concerto, for jazz quartet and string ensemble (1961), world premiere at Festival Strings in Lucerne (Dir. Rudolf Baumgartner)
- Der Rattenfänger von Hameln, for clarinet and piano (1961)
- Miracles, 11 songs for soprano and orchestra (1961)

=== At Centre de Recherches Sonores, Geneva ===
- Suisse Vigilante, for tape (1963), music for Expo '64, Lausanne
- Éclipses, for tape (1964), premiere at Lucern Festival 1973
- L'Art de la Table, for tape (1964)
- Flüsterbogen, background or exhibition music (1964)
- La Porte Noire, radiophonic work (1964)
- Zéa, radiophonic work (1965)
- Entretiens, for tape (1965)
- Mystic Puzzle I, for prepared piano and harpsichord (1964), premiere at Museum of Modern Art, New York 1966 (Antoinette Vischer, harpsichord, Georges Gruntz, piano)
- Roulette, 7 pieces for clarinet solo, (1964), premiere at Conway Hall London 1965 (Elisabeth Dean, clarinet), later performed by Luc Hoffmann
- Les quatres solitudes, for violoncello solo, premiere Städtisches Podium Zürich (Esther Nyffenegger, cello)
- Mystic Puzzle II, for jazz ensemble and tape (1966), premiere Radio Genève (Group des dix)
- Les Vêtements de la Demoiselle, for tape (1967)
- Entretiens Solitaires, for speaker, 9 instruments, tape and 2 dancers (1968), premiere Montreux 1968, with the use of live electronics
- Anima ou Les Rêves de Damien, for tape (1967)
- Illumination (music for Expo '70, Osaka, Japan 1970), with André Zumbach (1969)
- Kyoto, for tape and instruments (1970), premiere at Festival d'Avignon, 1970
- Thai Clarinet, for clarinet and tape (1970), premiere at 7th Diorama de la musique contemporaine, Lucerne 1973

=== At Instituut voor Sonologie, Utrecht ===
- Hydrophonie I, for tape (1969), premiere Fylkingen, Stockholm 1970 (Unesco Convention)
- Consolations, for tape (1984), premiere Geertekerk Utrecht, Holland, 1984
- Dialogue, for tape and gamelan orchestra (1984), premiere Stedelijk Museum, Amsterdam, 1984
- Dialogue (computer version), for tape (1984)
- Champs Magnétiques Ritournelles, for tape (1985)
- Ritournelles 1-3, for soprano and computer (1984-1986), premiere ICMC 1986, Royal Conservatory, The Hague (Dieuwke Albers, soprano)
