= Johan Wagenaar =

Dutch composer and organist

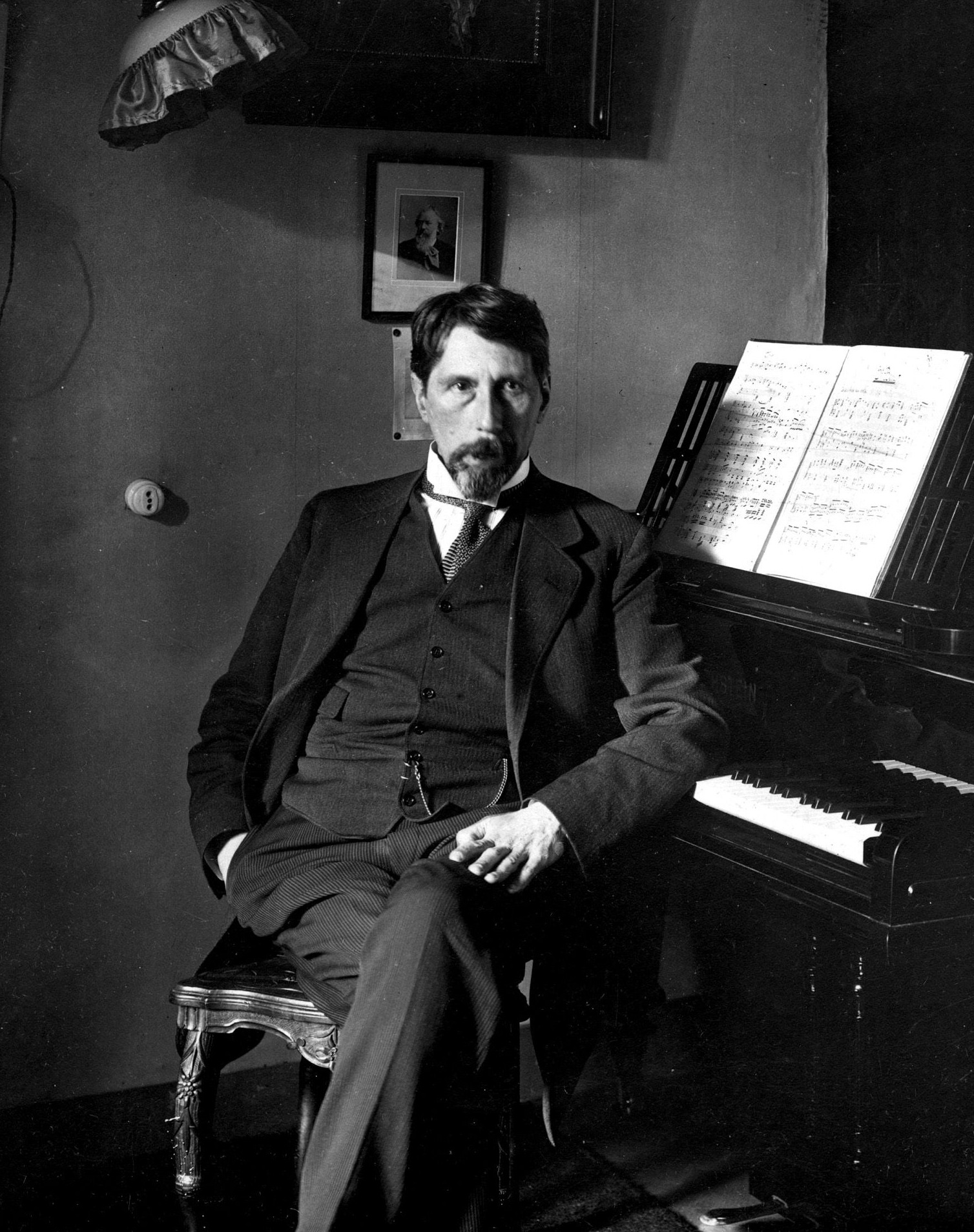

Background information
- Born: November 1, 1862; Utrecht, Netherlands
- Origin: Netherlands
- Died: June 17, 1942 (aged 79) The Hague, Netherlands
- Genre: Classical
- Occupation: Composer
- Instrument: Organ
- Spouse: Dina Petronella van Valkenburg

Johan Wagenaar (1 November 1862 – 17 June 1941) was a Dutch composer and organist.

== Life ==
Born in Utrecht, out of wedlock, he was the son of Cypriaan Gerard Berger van Hengst and Johanna Wagenaar. Wagenaar's parents were of different social strata: his father was an aristocrat, while his mother was of more humble origins. For this reason, Wagenaar's parents were not married, and thus Wagenaar received his mother's name as his family name. While Wagenaar resented that his parents never got married, he was by no means neglected by his father.

Wagenaar evidenced a talent for music as a child. However, he did not begin to receive a formal education in music until age 13, with subsequent instruction in piano, organ, violin, theory, and composition. He was under the tutelage of the composer Richard Hol and the organist Samuel de Lange, Jr. In 1892, he studied with Brahms' friend Heinrich von Herzogenberg in Berlin, specifically taking lessons in counterpoint.

In 1888, he succeeded Richard Hol as organist of Utrecht Cathedral, and earned fame for his skills at organ performances. In Utrecht, Wagenaar became a teacher at the music school in 1896, and the school's director in 1904. He also received an appointment with the Utrecht Municipal Orchestra (Utrechtsch Stedelijk Orkest). Between 1919 and 1937, Wagenaar was director of the Royal Conservatory at the Hague. His pupils included Peter van Anrooy, Emile Enthoven, Henri van Goudoever, Alexander Voormolen, Leon Orthel, Clara Wildschut, Allard de Ridder, Willem Pijper, Hendrika Tussenbroek, and Bernard Wagenaar. See: List of music students by teacher: T to Z#Johan Wagenaar.

On 23 July 1897, Wagenaar married Dina Petronella van Valkenburg. They had two daughters, pianist and pedagogue Nelly Wagenaar and composer Johanna Wagenaar. He died in Den Haag.

== Works ==
Wagenaar's compositions include operas, cantatas, organ music, and orchestral works. The music of Hector Berlioz had a modest influence on his works, but a much more pronounced influence was Richard Strauss.

In his later years, Wagenaar received an honorary Doctorate of Music from Utrecht University.

== Compositions (partial list) ==
=== Opera ===
- Proefzingen, humoristic scene in one act, WoO. (1913)
- The Merchant of Venice after William Shakespeare, Op. 20

=== Orchestral ===
- Frithjofs Meerfahrt, Concert Piece Op. 5 (1884)
- Fancy-fair (Weensche wals) for orchestra, Op. 8b
- Koning Jan, Overture based on Shakespeare's King Lear, Op. 9
- Frühlingsgewalt, concert overture Op. 11 (1892)
- Romantic intermezzo, Op. 13
- Levenszomer, fantasy for orchestra, Op. 21
- Cyrano de Bergerac, overture, Op. 23 (1905)
- Saul en David (Saul and David), symphonic poem, Op. 24 (1906)
- De getemde feeks (The Taming of the Shrew), overture, Op. 25 (1909)
- De cid, Op. 27 (1908)
- Symphoniëtta, Op. 32
- Avondfeest en Bruidsmarsch for Orchestra, Op. 34
- Driekoningenavond (Twelfth Night), overture, Op. 36 (1928)
- Intermerzzo pastorale for orchestra, Op. 37
- Wiener Dreivierteltakt, waltz cycle, Op. 38 (1929)
- De Philosophische Prinses, overture after Carlo Gozzi, Op. 39
- Aveux de Phèdre: scène tirée de la tragédie 'Phèdre' de Jean Racine pour soprano et orchestre, Op. 41 (1935)
- Amphytrion, overture, Op. 45 (1938)
- Feestmars voor het Concertgebouworkest, WoO. (1937)
- Elverhoï, symphonic poem, Op. 48 (1940)

=== Soloist and orchestra ===
- Larghetto for oboe and orchestra, op. 40 (1934)
- Aveux de Phèdre for soprano and orchestra, op. 41 (text by Jean Racine)

=== Choral ===
- 3 Vrouwenkoren a capella, Op. 7b
- De Schipbreuk, cantata, Op. 8 (1889)
- 3 dubbelcanons for female choir a capella, Op. 12
- Calme des Nuits for mixed choir and piano, Op. 14.
- Bruidsvaart der Roze, waltz for female choir and piano, Op. 15
- Zweedsche Marsch for male choir and orchestra or piano four hands, Op. 16a
- Ode aan de vriendschap for gemengd koor and piano, Op. 16b
- Seefahrt for male choir a capella, Op. 17
- Prière au Printemps for female choir and piano, Op. 18
- Fantasie over een oud Nederlandsch lied for male choir and orchestra, Op. 19
- Hans und Grethel for female choir a capella, Op. 22
- 3 canons voor vrouwenstemmen, Op. 28
- De fortuinlijke kist - Singspiel in one act for female choir, Op. 29
- Chanson - Vijfstemmig madrigaal, Op. 30
- Des winters als het reghent for female choir a capella, Op. 30
- Canticum for mixed choir, Op. 33
- Jupiter Amans for choir, soli, piano and orchestra, Op. 35
- Psalm 100, vers 4 (for choir a capella), Op. 42

=== Chamber music ===
- Fantasiestukken for violin and piano, Op. 2
- String Quintet, Op. 4

=== Songs ===
- Liedje van de Linden, WoO. (1889)
- Rondedans "Hei 't was in de Mei", WoO. (1889)
- Twee humoristische dialogen for soprano and bass, WoO. (1894)
- Twilight, WoO. (1894)
- Five Songs, Op. 6
- Lied, Op. 7a

=== Piano music ===
- Impromptu à la Mazurka, Op. 1

=== Organ music ===
- Intermezzo, WoO. (1889)
- Intrada, WoO. (1894)
- Introduction and Fugue, Op. 3
- Koraalbewerking en Fugetta, Op. 12a
- Koraalfantasie over "Komt dankt nu allen God" for organ and brass, WoO. (1923)
