= Hendrika van Tussenbroek =

Dutch composer and musicologist

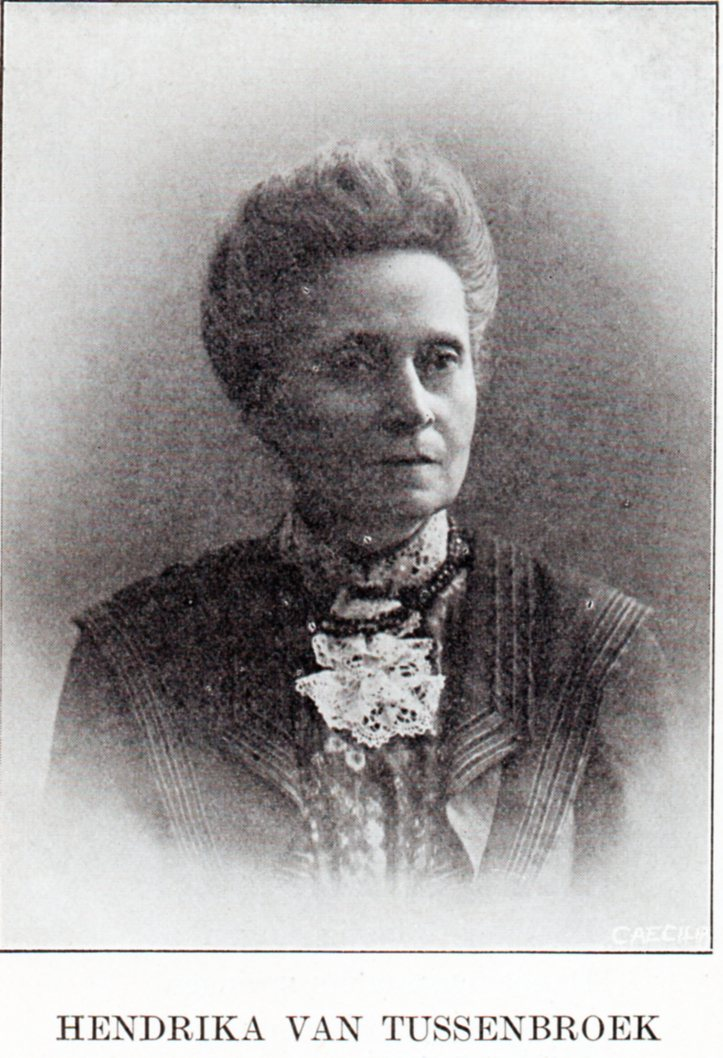

Hendrika Cornelia van Tussenbroek (2 December 1854 – 21 June 1935) was a Dutch composer and teacher who is best known for her music for children.

Tussenbroek was born in Utrecht. She studied music with Richard Hol and Johan Wagenaar, and collaborated with composer Catharina van Rennes. She gave singing and piano lessons in Utrecht and Amsterdam. Several of her songs were included in the popular Dutch textbook Can You Still Sing, Sing Along, which was reprinted in 41 editions between 1906 and 1986.

Tussenbroek wrote words as well as music for many of her songs and operettas. She also composed music for texts by other writers, including Jan Dirk Christiaan van Dokkum, J.N. van Hall, Jan Pieter Heije, C.H. de Jong and Jacoba Mossel.

Tussenbroek's children's operetta De Drie Kaboutertjes (The Three Goblins; opus 13) was performed at the National Exhibition of Women's Labor at The Hague in 1898. Tussenbroek rehearsed the children herself. The premiere was for paid subscribers; a free performance open to the public was held later.

Helen Metzelaar noted in 2001 that Tussenbroek and Catharina van Rennes "inspired a love of music in both young and old" and "created a new genre for children which remained viable in the Netherlands up to the 1960s."
