= Catharina van Rennes =

Dutch composer (1858–1940)

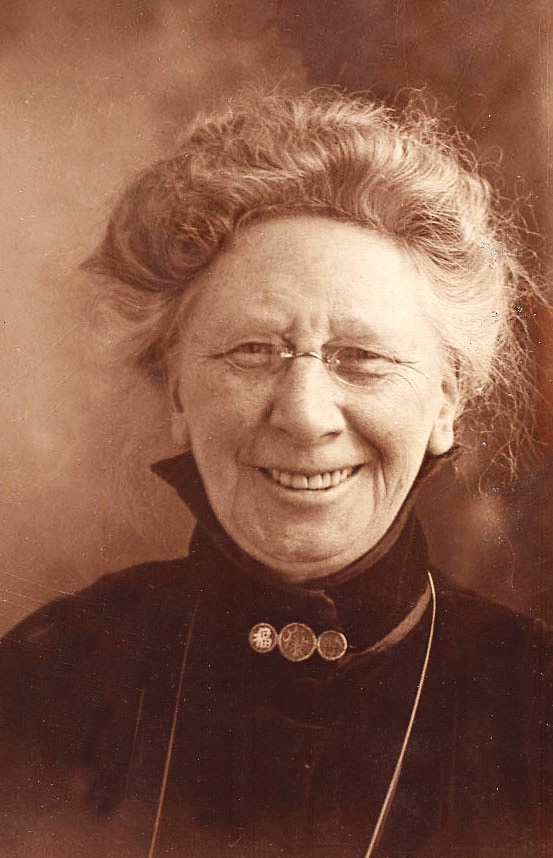
Catharina van Rennes

Catharina van Rennes (2 August 1858, Utrecht – 23 September 1940, Amsterdam) was a Dutch music educator, soprano singer and composer.

Van Rennes was the daughter of Jan van Rennes and Marianna Josepha de Jong. Among her tutors were Richard Hol and Johan Messchaert. She made a career as a singer in oratorios and was highly praised for her interpretations of Schumann Lieder. She was also known for vocal compositions. She composed and conducted a cantata for The International Alliance meeting of the women's suffrage movement held in Amsterdam in 1909 which was performed by the Queen's Royal Band.

Van Rennes established her own singing school and developed her own teaching technique. Like her contemporary Hendrika Tussenbroek, she is remembered today for some popular Dutch children's songs such as "Drie kleine kleutertjes die zaten op een hek" (Three little toddlers were sitting on a fence), a translation of a Kate Greenaway verse, and "Madonnakindje" (Madonna child) as well as a religious song Kind'ren van één vader" (Children of one Father).

== Works ==
Selected works include:

- Lentetover, songs for children
- Jong Holland, songs for children
- Vocal quartets, Op. 24
- Duets, Op. 59
