= Vanessa Lann =

American composer

- Born: April 6, 1968 (age 58); Brooklyn, New York, US
- Education: Tanglewood Institute; Royal Conservatory of The Hague
- Alma mater: Harvard University summa cum laude 1990
- Occupations: Composer, pianist
- Years active: 40+ years
- Employer: ArtEZ University of the Arts and Webster University
- Style: Contemporary classical
- Awards: John Knowles Paine Award; Bohemians Prize, Hugh F. MacColl Prize
- Website: vanessalann.com

Vanessa Lann (born April 6, 1968, in Brooklyn, New York) is an American-Dutch composer living in the Netherlands.

Lann is known for contemporary compositions for underutilized instruments such as the bass clarinet, bassoon and toy piano. Her compositions have been broadcast on radio, recorded on compact discs, and performed in music festivals in Europe and North America. She has written numerous types of compositions, including concertos and operas. In 1990, she was musical director at the American Repertory Theater. Reviewer David Toub described her music as "expertly performed". The New York Times music reviewer Allan Kozinn described her composition Is a Bell ... a Bell? as a "propulsively rhythmic score" which was charming with its use of two toy pianos to bring out "different timbral qualities." Music reviewer Jed Distler described her compositions as "gracious keyboard writing and humor." Dutch music critic for the daily newspaper de Volkskrant, Frits van der Waa, has reviewed her music on numerous occasions. He described her hour-long opera The Silence of Saar in 2013 as an "endless series of mind-numbing variations." He described her music in 2005 as "intense but sweet juicy tension," and her composition for the Delft Chamber Music Festival in 2007 as "beautiful."

== Selected compositions ==
- moonshadow sunshadow
- Lullabye for a young girl dreaming
- O Whispering Suns
- The Silence of Sarah
- Entranced By The Beckoning Light for piano solo (written for the Indonesian composer / pianist Ananda Sukarlan)
