= Joseph Marx =

Austrian composer and critic (1882–1964)

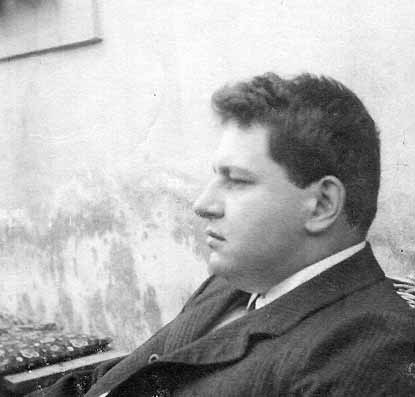
- Marx in 1912
- Born: Joseph Rupert Rudolf Marx; 11 May 1882; Graz, Austria-Hungary
- Died: 3 September 1964 (aged 82); Graz, Austria
- Occupations: Composer; Music critic; Teacher

Joseph Rupert Rudolf Marx (11 May 1882 – 3 September 1964) was an Austrian composer, teacher and critic. He is best known for his 150 lieder, most accompanied by piano, with some scored for orchestra.

== Life and career ==
Marx was born in Graz and pursued studies in philosophy, art history, German studies, and music at Graz University, earning several degrees, including a doctorate in 1909 under Alexius Meinong. His thesis was an expansion of a 1907 scholarly study of tonality in which he had coined the term "atonality". He began composing seriously in 1908 and over the next four years he produced around 120 songs. In 1914 he joined the faculty of the Vienna Music Academy, later becoming the institution's director in 1922. When the school was reorganized as the Hochschule für Musik in 1924, he was appointed to the position of rector, holding that post for three years. Some of his notable students include Johann Nepomuk David, Richard Flury, Ivana Lang, Alois Melichar, Hisatada Otaka, Florica Racovitză-Flondor, Lucijan Marija Škerjanc, Paul Ulanowsky, Ludovit Rajter, Georg Tintner, Jenő Takács, Kurt Schwertsik, and Clara Wildschut. From 1931 to 1938 he was music critic for the Neues Wiener Journal and following World War II he was critic for the Wiener Zeitung.

A collection of Marx's criticisms and essays, Betrachtungen eines romantischen Realisten was published in Vienna in 1947. Just before he died, he published a book on acoustics, tonality, aesthetics and musical philosophy entitled Weltsprache Musik (Vienna, 1964).

As a composer, Marx is chiefly remembered for his vocal music, particularly his more than 150 lieder. Although most of his songs used piano accompaniment, about two dozen of them used symphonic accompaniment. His style is characterized by Slavonic and Italian elements, often with an impressionistic kind of lyricism. His output in the 1920s and early 1930s was focused on orchestral works, followed by a period devoted primarily to chamber music for the remainder of his career. In an interview given to Elyse Mach ("Great Contemporary Pianists Speak for Themselves"; Dover Books on Music), Jorge Bolet said that the "Romantic Piano Concerto" by Joseph Marx was his favorite among the great virtuoso concertos because of the enormous show of strength required from the soloist.

Marx died in his home city of Graz, aged 82.

== Works ==
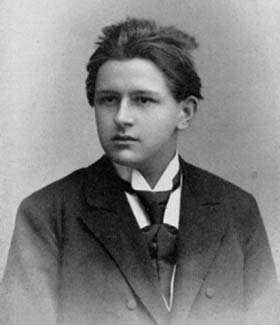
Marx at 21 years old (1903)

=== Vocal works ===
Choral music

- Ein Neujahrshymnus (A New Year's Hymn) for mixed chorus and orchestra (1914)
- Berghymne (Mountain Hymn) for mixed chorus and orchestra (1910)
- Herbstchor an Pan (Autumn Chorus to Pan) for mixed chorus, boys' chorus, organ and orchestra (1911)
- Morgengesang (Morning Chant) for male chorus and orchestra (1910)
- Abendweise (Evening Melody) for male chorus, brass orchestra, timpani and organ (1912)
- Gesang des Lebens (Song of Life) for male chorus and organ (1914)

Songs/orchestral songs

- Approx. 150 Lieder such as Nachtgebet and Marienlied, two dozen of which are also available as orchestral songs
- Verklärtes Jahr (Transfigured Year) for medium voice and orchestra (orchestral song cycle, 1932, also available with piano accompaniment)

=== Instrumental works ===
Orchestral music

- Eine Herbstsymphonie (Autumn Symphony, 1921)
- Eine symphonische Nachtmusik (Symphonic Night Music, 1922)
- Idylle - Concertino über die pastorale Quart (1925)
- Eine Frühlingsmusik (Spring Music, 1925)
- Nordland-Rhapsodie (Nordic Rhapsody, 1929)
- Alt-Wiener Serenaden (Old Vienna Serenades, 1941)
- Sinfonia in modo classico for string orchestra (1944)
- Partita in modo antico for string orchestra (1945)
- Feste im Herbst (Autumnal Revelries, 1946)

Concertos

- "Romantic Piano Concerto" in E major (1919–20)
- "Castelli Romani" for piano and orchestra in E-flat major (1929–30)

=== Other works ===
- Six piano pieces (1916)
- String Quartet in A major (1936, rev. in 1948 as Quartetto Chromatico)
- Quartetto in modo antico (1938)
- Quartetto in modo classico (1941)
- Two violin sonatas
- Works for cello and piano
- "Trio-Phantasie"
- Three works for piano quartet
- Organ pieces
- Unpublished piano pieces
- Works for voice and chamber ensemble
