= Richard Hol =

Dutch composer and conductor

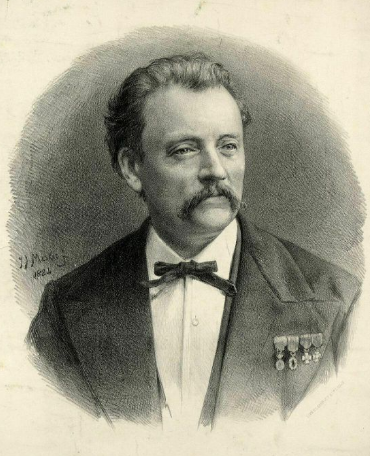
Richard Hol - portrait by J.J. Mesker (1884)

Richard (or Rijk) Hol (23 July 1825, in Amsterdam – 14 May 1904, in Utrecht) was a Dutch composer and conductor, based for most of his career at Utrecht. His conservative music showed the influence of Ludwig van Beethoven, Felix Mendelssohn, and Robert Schumann and the Leipzig school, though as a conductor he offered Dutch audiences the more revolutionary music of Hector Berlioz and Richard Wagner.

== Life ==
Richard Hol followed a course in piano under Jan George Bertelman at the royal conservatory of Amsterdam; after his graduation in 1844 he made a living as piano accompanist. In part on the basis of his choral compositions he was appointed director of the Amsterdamse Toonkunstkoor in 1857. In 1862, when Johannes Verhulst was appointed to the position, Hol removed to Utrecht, where he came to occupy the center of musical life, taking up the post of Ferdinand Kufferath in directing the city concerts (stadsconcerten) and the Utrecht Toonkunstkoor for the remainder of his life. In addition he was organist at the cathedral, 1869–1888.

From 1875 he served as director of the Stedelijke Muziekschool at Utrecht, teaching music theory and history himself. Among his prominent pupils were Johan Wagenaar, who succeeded him as teacher and cathedral organist, Catharina van Rennes, and Hendrika Tussenbroek.

In his last years Hol published pieces in numerous journals and served from 1894 until his death as editor of the organ journal Het Orgel. When the Nederlandsche Toonkunstenaars-Vereeniging was founded in 1875, he served as its first director. Among the many decorations he received was his appointment in 1875 as a corresponding member of the Académie française.

He composed an anthem for Transvaal, in use until the British occupied it in 1887. His posthumous reputation remained largely confined to Dutch audiences and choral singing groups, until his four symphonies began to be recorded at the close of the 20th century.

His vaderlandische legende ("patriotic legend") for chorus, orchestra and organ, De Vliegende Hollander ("The Flying Dutchman"), Op. 70 (1874) was described in 1904 as frequently performed, in Le guide musical, reviewing a concert with a performance of the ballad, in The Hague.

His daughter, Jacoba, was a physical geographer.

== Incomplete list of compositions ==
=== Symphonies ===
- No. 1 in C minor (1863)
- No. 2 in D minor, op. 44 (1866, published 1868 by Th. J. Roothaan & Co. of Amsterdam)
- No. 3 in B♭, op. 101 (1867/1884)
- No. 4 in A minor (1889)

=== Operas ===
- Floris V (premiered Amsterdam, 1892)
- Uit de branding (premiered Amsterdam, 1894)

=== Other music with voices ===
==== Ballads ====
- Der blinde König, Ballade after Ludwig Uhland, op.39 (published 1866 or 1867)
- De vliegende hollander, op. 70 (about 1880)

==== Songs and song cycles ====
- See also "The Lied and Art Song Texts Page - Richard Hol".
- Des visschers bruid. Gedicht van Frisius (pseud. of H. G. H. Groenewegen) voor mezzo sopraan met piano. Op. 7. (pub. 1855)
- 2 Lieder, Warum and Wanderlied.
- Drie liederen : voor mannenstemmen (solo en koor), op. 22 (texts by Nicolaas Beets and by Frisius)
- Liederen for 2 singers and piano, op. 53
- Prijsliederen, op. 56 (texts by Th. van Rijswijck)
- Uw naam, op. 67 (after Frisius)
- De jeugdige zanger, op. 71

==== Oratorios and Cantatas ====
- David, Dramatisches Gedicht für Chor, Solo und Orchester, op. 81 (pub. 1881)

==== Liturgical Music ====
- Mass no.1, op.28 (pub.1865)
- Psalm 23, Op.35 (published 1864)

=== Organ music ===
- Fugues (1862)
- Andante funèbre, A minor (1869)
- Prelude and fugue, C minor (1872)
- Pastorale, G major (1872, revised 1875)
- Élégisch toonstuk, op. 131, F major (published 1890s. For organ or harmonium)

=== Piano music ===
- Impromptu in A minor
- Sonatines, op. 118 (in C, G and in A minor)
