= Marie Guilleray =

- Origin: France
- Genres: Improvised music Electroacoustic music Contemporary
- Website: Official website

Marie Guilleray (born August 1978) is a vocal performer, improviser and composer currently based in The Hague, Netherlands. She performs mainly in free improvisation, experimental and contemporary music. Her work focuses on vocal extended techniques, sound poetry, and the combination of voice and electronics. Currently she is a member of Royal improvisers Orchestra and works on various experimental, improvised and electronic music projects.

== Discography ==
=== Albums ===
- "Hijas", Heyoky (2004)
- "It's over", Ladies and Jazzwomen (2006)
- "Lady blues", Ladies and Jazzwomen (2007)
