= Jan George Bertelman =

Dutch composer and music teacher

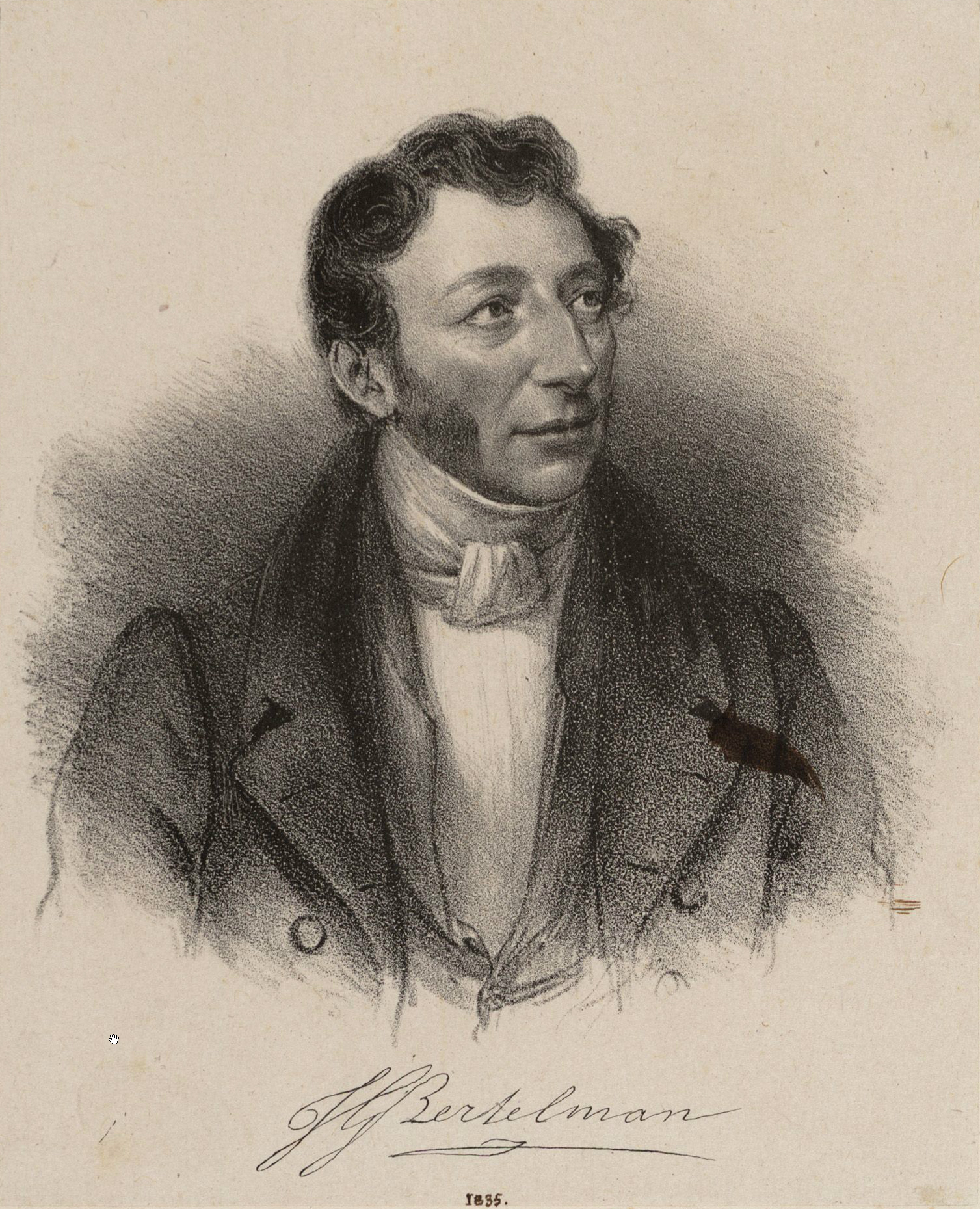
Jan George Bertelman (1782–1854)

Jan George Bertelman (Amsterdam, January 21, 1782 - January 25, 1854), was a Dutch composer and music teacher.

== Life and work ==
Bertelman was born in Amsterdam, Dutch Republic, in 1782. He was the son of Henry Joost Bertelman and Johanna Shock. When Bertelman was nine years old, his father died. He studied with Daniel Bracht Huyser (1769), a blind organist who worked at the Nieuwe Kerk in Amsterdam. In addition to his musical studies, Bertelman provided for his mother and himself through working other jobs. In Amsterdam, Bertelman was a composer, organist and music teacher. His pupils included John Bree, Richard Hol and Hermina Maria Dijk.

Bertelman was an honorary member of four organizations: the Royal Academy of Arts, the Society for Utilities General, the Society for the Promotion of Musical Arts, and the Academy of Santa Cecilia in Rome. In 1842, he was appointed Knight of the Order of the Dutch Lion.

Bertelman married Dorothea Christina Kathman in Amsterdam on April 28, 1820. He died in January 1854 at the age of 72 in Amsterdam. His son, Johannes Jacobus Bertelman, was a painter and later became the co-founder of the Museum Gouda.

Bertelman was buried in the Nieuwe Kerk in Amsterdam. In Amsterdam, Bertelmanstraat (Bertelman Street) and Bertelmanplein (Bertelman Square) are named after him.

Bertelman is regarded as a competent music theorist who contributed to the development of harmony theory for musical instruments and as one of the first Dutch composers who realized the importance of Bach. As a composer he is considered a good but conservative artist.

== Selected compositions ==
- De slag bij Nieuwpoort ("The Battle of Nieuwpoort", a cantata)
- Het vijftigjarig bestaan der Maatschappij Felix Meritis ("The fiftieth anniversary of the Felix Meritis Society")
- Several songs in the children's songbook Kinderliederen (1843) by J.P. Heije, including Lammetje, loop je zoo eenzaam te blâten / Over de heî! Over de heî ("Lamb, you walk so lonely to bleat / Over the heath!")
- Requiem for three-part choir and orchestra (1808)
- Missa, a mass.
- Other assorted cantatas, overtures, concertos, salon pieces for piano (including variations on the cavatina Di tanti palpiti by Rossini), songs, and choral works.
