= But What About the Noise ... =

Composition for percussion ensemble by John Cage

But What About the Noise...
- by John Cage
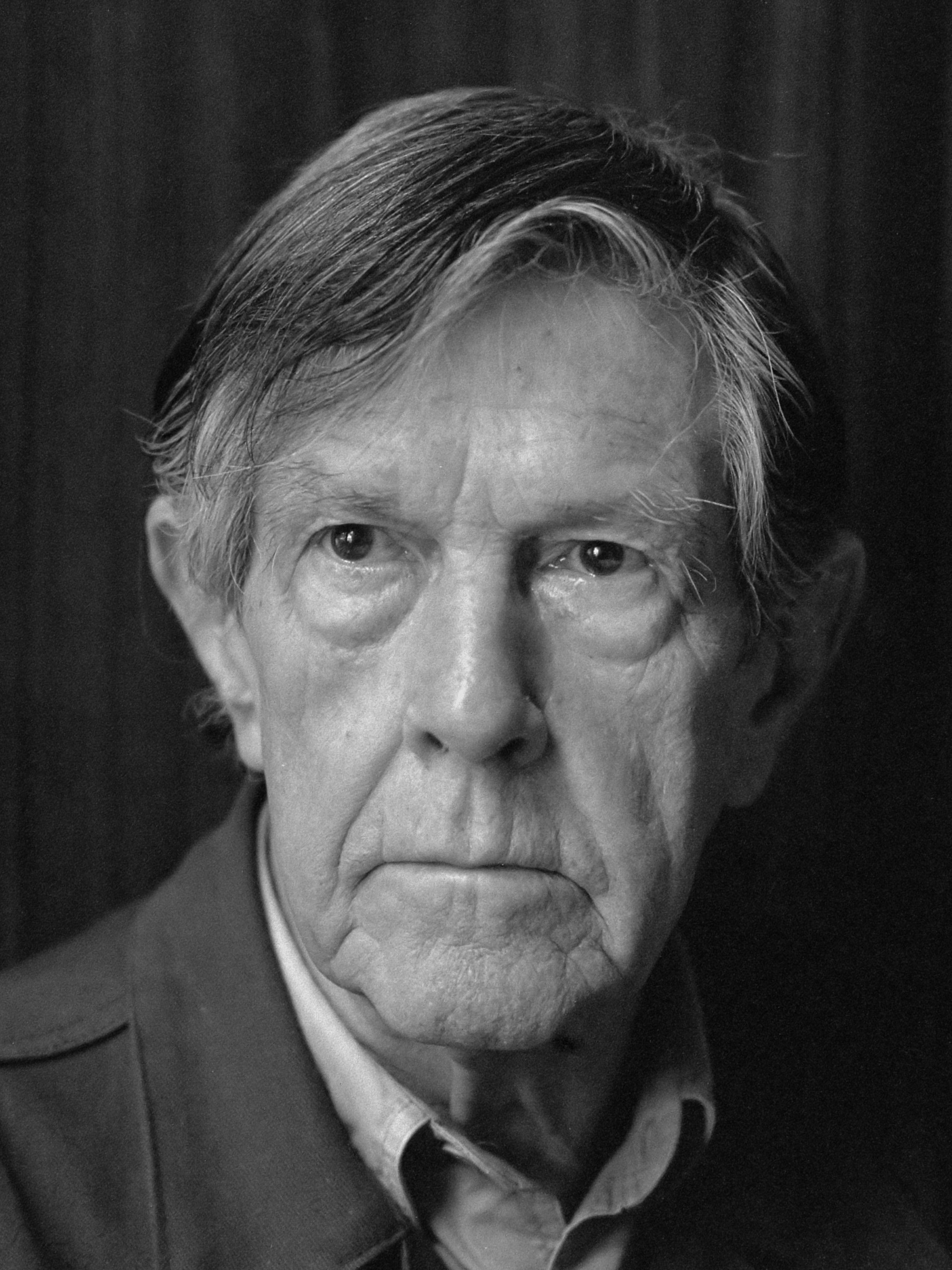
- Cage in 1988
- Composed: 1985
- Published: Edition Peters
- Movements: 1
- Scoring: A percussion ensemble of 3–10 performers

But What About the Noise of Crumpling Paper Which He Used to Do in Order to Paint the Series of "Papiers Froissés" Or Tearing Up Paper to Make "Papiers Déchirés?" Arp Was Stimulated by Water (Sea, Lake, and Flowing Waters Like Rivers), Forests, sometimes shortened as But What About the Noise ..., is a composition for percussion ensemble by American composer John Cage. It was finished in 1985.

== Composition ==
John Cage composed this piece as a way of celebrating the work of Jean Arp on the occasion of the centenary of his birth. Jean Arp, an artist in which John Cage found much inspiration in the period the piece was composed in, created paintings and collages, circa 1915–1930, including maneuvers of chance, like dropping cutouts of paper or strings and cementing them where they fell. John Cage attempted to recreate the spirit of simultaneity and subtlety of the works by Jean Arp. Its long title comes from one of the letters sent as response to one of John Cage's letters made by Greta Ströh, the director of the Arp Foundation at the time. Even though Cage's inspiration came through the works by Arp, the composition is dedicated to Les Percussions de Strasbourg. This piece features what are often called by John Cage "sounds of nature", which consist of sounds that resemble environments, and use word in his music, therefore blurring the line between music and literature, as he did in Child of Tree, Food and Ryoanji. This piece was finished in August 1985 and was published that same year by Edition Peters in New York.

== Structure ==
The composition is in one movement and its performance duration may vary from realization to realization, but it typically lasts for about twenty minutes. It is scored for a percussion ensemble. However, whereas the score includes parts for ten players, John Cage's indeterminate style makes clear that the ensemble could consist of any number of players between three and ten, and both the desired timelength and the amount of repetitions would vary depending on the will of the performers. The tempo in this composition is meant to be slow, but dependent on the performers, and it is not necessary that all performers maintain the same tempo. It allows for several changes of dynamics, completely dependent on the performers, as they are not mentioned in the original score. As specified by Cage, the performers may be stationed around the audience, or within it in the case that the audience is not seated. However, the performers can also be on the stage, as long as they are not close to one another.

This piece uses graphic notation and consists of lines of text where "." is a quarter note rest, "+" is a slightly resonant instrument made of wood, metal and glass, "O" is the sound of pouring or bubbling in water and crumpling and tearing paper, and "(" and ")" are also these sounds but cut in half, that is, sounded twice and always for the same length of time.

== Recordings ==
Given the indeterminate nature of this composition, each performance tends to feature distinct traits, and the main performer is often credited for realizing the piece. The following is a partial list of recordings of this piece:

- The Maelström Percussion Ensemble made a five-performer recording of the piece, realized by Jan Williams. It was recorded between May 28 and June 1, 1995 and released by Hat Hut.
- The Helios Quartet recorded the piece in 2001. The recording was released in January 2002 by WERGO.
- The Amadinda Percussion Group also recorded the piece later in 2011. The recording was released in April 2011 by Hungaroton.
