= Royal Conservatory of The Hague =

Music school in the Netherlands

Royal Conservatoire
- Koninklijk Conservatorium
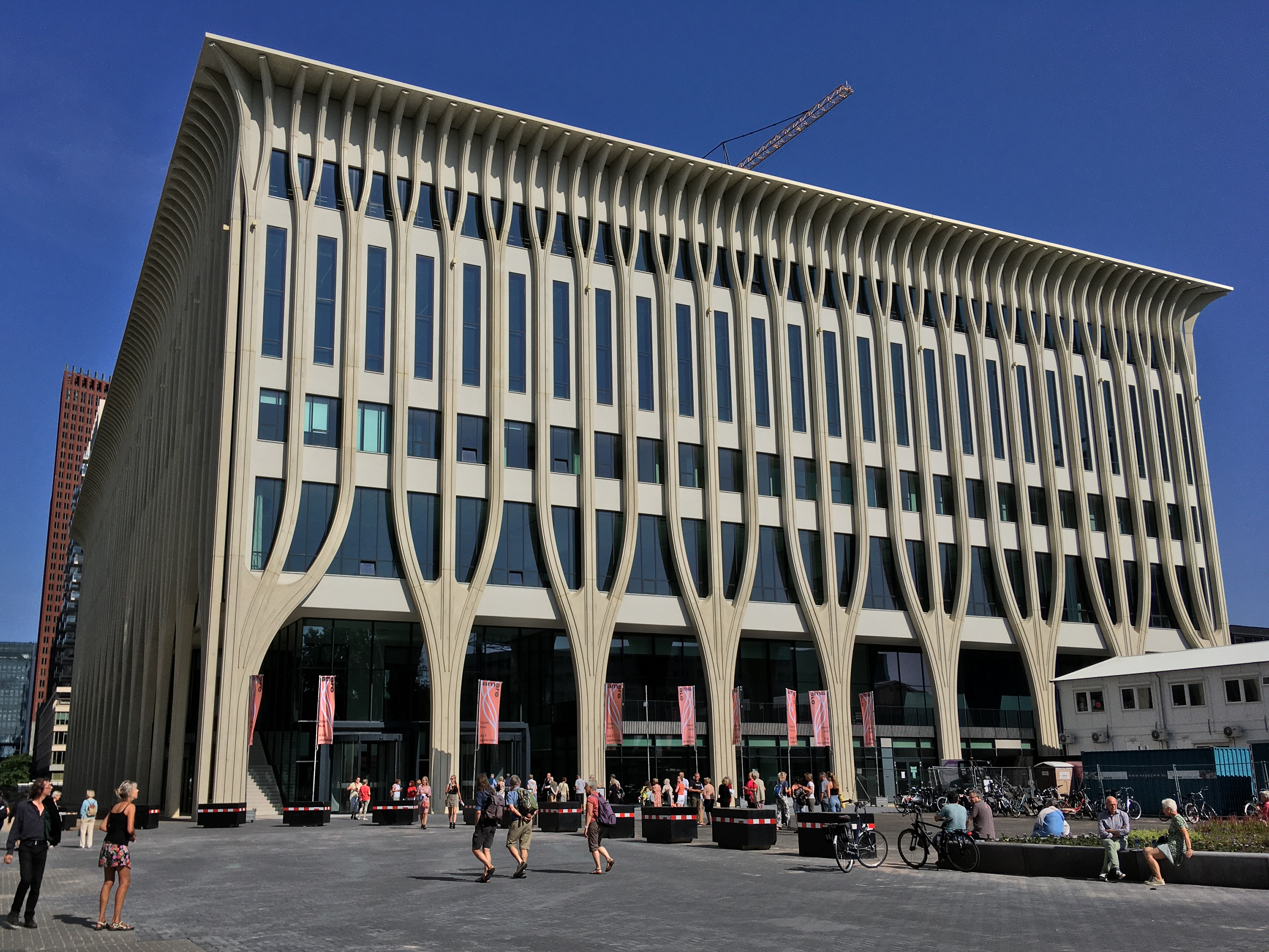
- Amare building
- Type: Public
- Established: 1826; 200 years ago
- Academic affiliations: University of the Arts in The Hague
- Director: Lies Colman
- Location: The Hague, Netherlands; 52°4′37.711″N 4°19′3.997″E
- Campus: Urban
- Website: www.koncon.nl/en/

The Royal Conservatoire (Dutch: Koninklijk Conservatorium, KC) is a conservatoire in The Hague, providing higher education in music and dance. The conservatoire was founded by King William I in 1826, making it the oldest conservatoire in the Netherlands. Since September 2021, the KC has been housed in the Amare building in the centre of the Hague, together with the Residentie Orkest and Nederlands Dans Theater (NDT).

In 1990 the Royal Conservatoire The Hague merged with the Royal Academy of Art The Hague, into the 'School of Visual Arts, Music and Dance'. In 2010 the Dutch government elevated the joint institution to University of the Arts The Hague. The two do also still go by their original names as well, to underline their individual identities.

== Education ==
The Bachelor of Music course offers a range of study options. The starting point is an individual curriculum in the fields of Classical Music, Early Music, Singing/Vocal, Jazz, Composition, Sonology, Art of Sound and Music Education.

The Master of Music course at the Royal Conservatoire covers a spectrum from performing musicians (Classical Music, Early Music and Jazz), creative and researching musicians (Composition, Sonology, ArtScience). The three Master programmes at the Royal Conservatoire are Master of Music, Master of Sonology and Master of Opera. The Master in Opera is offered by the Dutch National Opera Academy, in association with the Conservatory of Amsterdam.

In this Conservatoire is its dance department in which a Bachelor of Dance can be obtained.

== Research ==
Alongside education and production, research is one of the pillars of the Royal Conservatoire. The focus of research within the educational programmes is directed towards the artistic-musical and intellectual development of the students.

In the Bachelor this involves the learning of basic research skills which a musician will require in their later music practice. These have relevance to the articulated ability to reflect on the musician’s own speciality.

Research in the Master course is more specifically directed towards the conducting of a research project where the student specialises in their own field. Types of research in the Master can range widely, for instance the making of instruments, experimentation, historical interpretation (e.g. in function of performance practice), creative (artistic) research, cultural/critical reflection and/or research in the field of didactics or pedagogy. The topics are usually directly related to the main subject, and are of importance both for artistic and intellectual development of the student as for the development of the field of study.

After the Master course students can apply for participation in the doctoral programme for musicians and composers which is facilitated by the Academy of Creative and Performing Art at Leiden University. A research training programme is offered by DocARTES, the collaboration of the Royal Conservatoire, the Conservatory of Amsterdam, the universities of Leiden, Leuven and Antwerp, and the Orpheus Institute in Ghent. The final PhD defense takes place at Leiden University through the Academy of Creative and Performing Arts. Just like with the Master course, the student’s own artistic practice is the central element in the PhD course.

== Alumni and faculty ==
The Royal Conservatoire has some notable alumni, including Michel van der Aa, Susanne Abbuehl, Hendrik Andriessen, Richard Ayres, Gerard Beljon, Jane M. Bowers, Rudi Martinus van Dijk, Marco Goecke, Barbara Hannigan, Rozalie Hirs, Geoffrey Lancaster, Vanessa Lann, Douglas Mews, Susanne Regel, Lawrence Renes, Shin Mizutani, Paul Steenhuisen, Ananda Sukarlan, Victor Varela, Henry Vega, Rodney Waschka II, Eva-Maria Westbroek, Clara Wildschut and Kristoffer Zegers.

Notable faculty (past and present) includes Louis Andriessen, Bob van Asperen, Michael Chance, Peter Kooy, Robin Blaze, Pascal Bertin, Dorothee Mields, Jill Feldman, Dina Appeldoorn, Clarence Barlow, Richard Barrett, Konrad Boehmer, Frans Brüggen, Wim Henderickx, Ton Koopman, Yannis Kyriakides, Reinbert de Leeuw, Kenneth Montgomery, Ryo Terakado, Eric Vloeimans and Dorothea Winter.
