= Jeanette Yanikian =

Jeanette Armine Yanikian
- Born: 22 July 1935; Baghdad, Iraq
- Died: 6 February 2008 (aged 72) Amsterdam, The Netherlands
- Occupations: Guitarist, performance artist, therapist
- Instruments: Electric guitar; bass guitar

Jeanette Yanikian (Baghdad, Iraq, 22 July 1935 – Amsterdam, the Netherlands, 6 February 2008) was a guitarist, performance artist, and therapist of Armenian descent, who was born in Baghdad, Iraq, and worked in the Netherlands.

== Career ==
Yanikian played electric guitar and bass guitar. She performed and recorded the collectively-composed opera Reconstructie (Steim, 1969) by Louis Andriessen, Reinbert de Leeuw, Misha Mengelberg, Peter Schat and Jan van Vijmen, and also recorded several albums with the Dutch new music ensemble, Hoketus. These albums include Tam Tam / Bint (Composers’ Voice, 1981) Balans (Composers’ Voice, 1986) and Mausoleum / Hoketus (Composers’ Voice, 1992).

Working as a visual and sound artist, Yanikian's performance “Aorta” was shown at the 1987 Ars Electronica festival in Linz, Austria. Based on Yanikian's own research into the processes of the human body, "Aorta" used stethoscopes, intravenous sensors, and other medical equipment to explore the sonic perceptibility of heartbeats, respiration, and circulation.

== Personal life and legacy ==
Yanikian was married to Dutch composer Louis Andriessen in 1996, whom she met in 1957 while he was studying in the Hague. They lived together in Amsterdam and were partners for over 40 years.

She was an active member of the Kommunistiese Partij Nederland/Marxisties Leninisties (KPN/ML).

Yanikian was also an active blue-water sailor, member of the Centre Nautique des Glénans in France, member of zeezeilvereniging Genosea in the Netherlands and owner of her own sail yacht type Zeevalk "Astrea" on which she sailed to Orford, East Anglia in the winter of 1985-1986.

Yanikian died in 2008 after battling a prolonged illness. Andriessen's five-part opera, La Commedia (2008), and David Lang’s evening-length work for string orchestra, darker (2010), are dedicated to Yanikian.
