= António Chagas Rosa =

Portuguese composer (born 1960)

António Chagas Rosa (born 1960) is a Portuguese composer of contemporary classical music.

His output includes chamber operas, song-cycles and numerous works for chamber and symphony orchestras. His work has been played all over Europe as well as in Asia and America.

== Biography ==
Born in Lisbon, he studied Piano at the Conservatório Nacional and History at the New University of Lisbon. From 1984 to 1987, with a scholarship from the Calouste Gulbenkian Foundation of Lisbon, Chagas Rosa studied Contemporary Piano and Chamber Music with Alexander Hrisanide at the Sweelinck Conservatory in Amsterdam. Between 1987 and 1992, with a scholarship granted by the Portuguese government, he studied composition at the Rotterdams Conservatory under Klaas de Vries and Peter Jan Wagemans.

In The Netherlands, António Chagas Rosa worked as a repetiteur and assistant at the Dutch opera house, Het Muziektheater, and became a teacher of the opera class at the Sweelinck Conservatorium. Among other productions, he worked with Robert Wilson on De Materie by Louis Andriessen, and with Oliver Knussen during the rehearsals of "Die Glückliche Hand", by Arnold Schönberg. As a pianist he took part in many of the concerts organized by the Gaudeamus and "The Unanswered Question" foundations. In 1989, being invited by the dance group Dansproductie of Amsterdam, he performed music by John Cage for prepared piano in many Dutch cities as well as in London, Mulhouse and Ghent.

In 1994, the ACARTE department of the Calouste Gulbenkian Foundation commissioned him with the composition of the chamber opera "Canticles for the remission of hunger", upon a libretto by the Portuguese writer Paulo Lages. Others commissioned works: International Music Festival of Macau, the Portuguese Radio (Antena 2), the Teatro Nacional de São Carlos in Lisbon, the Casa de Mateus Foundation, the Nederlands Kamerkoor, and many others.

His works have been performed in several modern music festivals in Portugal, Spain, France, the Netherlands, Austria, Germany, Sweden, Switzerland, Ukraine, the US, Macau and Hong-Kong, etc. In 1997 he represented Portugal in the Tribune Internationale des Compositeurs (UNESCO) in Paris with his concerto for piano and orchestra. During the 1998 edition of Wien Modern, the Austrian ensemble Klangforum premiered Moh (commissioned by the Portuguese festival Music in November); this piece was also performed in Spain (Ensems, Valencia) and Portugal ( Serralves hall, in Porto) by the Remix Ensemble, with Stefan Asbury as conductor.

In 1999 and 2002 he was member of the juri of the Premio Valentino Bucchi Competition for Composition in Rome. In 2000 his song cycle Non Altro for tenor, piano and electronics was premiered at the Concertgebouw of Amsterdam, by Marcel Beekman and Hans Adolfsen. Several of his works are published in Portugal and the Netherlands (Fermata, Musicoteca, Donemus), and there are recordings of his Piano Sonata, Altro for piccolo and piano (Numérica, Port.), and of 4 Cartoons for prepared marimba (Deux Elles, UK).

António Chagas Rosa's latest opera - Melodias Estranhas - upon a libretto by the Dutch writer Gerrit Komrij, was the result of a joint commission made by the cities of Oporto and Rotterdam, European Capital of Culture in 2001. It tells three episodes of the life of the 16th century humanist philosopher Damião de Góis, student and friend of Erasmus of Rotterdam. Also a composer, he was accused by the Inquisition of writing inappropriate (polyfonic) music, imprisoned and later killed. The premiere of this opera took place at the Schouwburg of Rotterdam, as a joint production of Casa da Música (Oporto) and the Onafhankelijk Toneel of Rotterdam.

Some of his most recent works include composisitons for the Nederlands Kamerkoor of Amsterdam, the Contemporary Music Group of Lisbon, the Portuguese percussion group Drumming (musical ensemble), Ensemble Musicatreize of Marseilles and the National Orchestra of Porto Casa da Música.

Since 1996 António Chagas Rosa teaches Chamber Music at the University of Aveiro (Portugal), at the Department of Communication and Arts, where he obtained his PhD in 2006.

== List of works ==
- Piano Sonata (1988) Premiered the same year at the concert hall "De Ijsbreker" of Amsterdam. Repeatedly performed in Portugal and the Netherlands. Recorded by Nancy Harper for NUMÉRICA (Port.)
- Tres Gacelas for contralto and chamber orchestra (1988/89). A song cycle upon poems by Lorca. Premiered at the concert hall "De Unie" in Rotterdam and performed the next year in Lisbon at the Calouste Gulbenkian Foundation by Sharon Cooper and Michel Tabachnik.
- Meghasandesham for harpsichord and string quartet (1989/90). Premiered in Lisbon in 1990 and, after being revised, in Kyiv in 1993 during the 2nd Forum of New Music.
- Antinous for string quartet and large orchestra (1990/92). Created at the Calouste Gulbenkian Foundation of Lisbon during the Modern Music Days of 1994 with the Chilingirian Quartet and the Gulbenkian Orchestra conducted by Lucas Pfaff.
- Songs of the Beginning for high voice and piano (1992). Songs upon a poem of Lao-Tze, written for the Canadian soprano Janice Jackson and premiered in Amsterdam at the "De Ijsbreker" the same year; recorded by the Dutch radio KRO.
- Canticles for the Remission of Hunger, a chamber opera in six scenes (1992/94). This opera was selected by the ACARTE Festival of Lisbon to stand together with Pina Bausch's Tanztheater of Wuppertal at the music theatre program of the year 1994.
- Afonso Domingues, por exemplo for tenor and piano (1994/97). A song cycle with poems by Paulo Lages; premiered at the Concertgebouw of Amsterdam, in the Netherlands, during a jubileum of the Dutch foundation "Vrienden van het Lied".
- Angkor for viola and piano (1994/95). Premiered in Stockholm by members of the Swedish chamber orchestra "KammerensembleN" to which his work was dedicated. Played in the Netherlands, Germany and Portugal.
- Piano Concerto (1994/95). Written for the Xth International Music Festival of Macau (1996); this work was performed by the American pianist Jay Gottlieb and by the Beijing Central Opera Symphony Orchestra conducted by Ronald Zollman. Recorded by the Portuguese radio and later broadcast throughout Europe by means of the "Union de Radios Européene".
- O Céu sob as Entranhas, for baritone and piano trio (1996). A song cycle written upon poems by the Portuguese poet Luís Miguel Nava, as the result of a commission from the national radio RDP 2. Premiered at the Theatre of São Carlos, Lisbon's opera house.
- Sept Épigrammes de Platon, for soprano and piano (1997). A song cycle written upon a set of poems by Plato. Commissioned by the ACARTE culture centre of Lisbon.
- 3 Consolations, for recorder and chamber orchestra (1997/98). A chamber concerto commissioned by the Calouste Gulbenkian Foundation of Lisbon, premiered during its modern music festival of 1999.
- Moh, for chamber orchestra (1998). Dedicated to "Klangforum Wien" and premiered in Vienna during the 1998 edition of the Wien Modern Festival.
- Four Cartoons, for solo prepared marimba (1999). Dedicated to the Portuguese marimba virtuoso Pedro Carneiro. Performed in several countries.
- Non Altro, for tenor, piano and tape (1999). A song cycle commissioned by the Portuguese Fundação da Casa de Mateus, and dedicated to Marcel Beekman and Hans Adolfsen. Premiéred at the Concertgebouw of Amsterdam in February 2000. Other concerts followed in the Netherlands and Portugal.
- Altro (2000), for piccolo and piano, premiered in Santa Maria da Feira, already recorded on CD.
- What the afternoon and the mountain said, for piano (2000). Premiered by Marino Formenti at the Los Angeles County Museum in April 2000.
- Melodias Estranhas (2000/1), a chamber opera in 3 acts commissioned by the cities of Oporto and Rotterdam, Cultural Capitals of Europe in 2001, upon a libreto by the Dutch poet Gerrit Komrij. Premiered at the Stadsschouwburg of Rotterdam in December 2001.
- Quatrains du Secret Estude (2002), for chorus a capella, upon texts by Nostradamus, commissioned by the Nederlands Kamerkoor of Amsterdam.
- ...pour les temps glissants... (2002), for bass clarinet and string trio, commissioned by the Grupo de Música Contemporânea de Lisboa.
- Zwei Kleinbauernlieder (2002), for tenor and piano, upon texts by Raphael Urweider, commissioned by the Iberia Festival 2002 (Musikhochschule Zürich/Winterthur); premiered in September 2002 by Marcel Beekman and Hans Adolfsen.
- Deep Water Music (2002), for 4 drum players, commissioned by the Portuguese percussion group ‘Drumming’.
- Naishapur (2003), for baritone, percussion and piano, a song cycle upon poems by Fernando Pessoa, commissioned by the Jeunesse Festival (Vienna 2003).
- Cicuta (2005, a song cycle for soprano and piano, upon poems by Maria Teresa Horta. Premiere: Casa da Música, Porto, 2005. W(commissioned by Casa da Música Porto).
- Serei só eu... (2005), for soprano and string quartet, upon Richard Wagner's text of Isolde's Liebestod (Jorge de Sena). Premiere: Arnold Schoenberg Center, Vienna, 2005. Work commissioned by the Ensemble Wiener Collage (Vienna).
- As Feiticeiras/Les Sorcières (2005/6, a scenic cantata commissioned by Ensemble Musicatreiza (Marseilles), upon an original poema by Maria Teresa Horta. Premiered on 29 March 2006 in Marseilles, at the Théâtre Les Bernardines. Recording available (Actes-Sud 2006). Production awarded with a Victoire de la Musique (Radio France 2007).
- A boca (2006), for bassoon, commissioned by Casa da Música, Porto, premiered on 24 September 2006 during the Musica Festival of Strasbourg.
- Tombeau de Marie Stuart (2007), for chamber orchestra, co-commissioned by Casa da Música Porto and Klangforum Wien. (premiered in Casa da Música on 29 November by Klangforum Wien).
- Mares I/Falésias, Mares II/Cavalos Marinhos e Mares III/Ilha de Moçambique (2008-9), a three part piece upon maritime impressions for 6 percussionists. Work dedicated to Drumming. Premiere: Festival Dias da Música Portuguesa, CCB, Lisbon, 13/07/08.
- 1st String Quartet (2009), commissioned by Câmara Municipal de Matosinhos, for the Matosinhos String Quartet. The premiere occurred in Matosinhos in 01/10/09.
- ...aquilo que voa. (2009), for large orchestra, commissioned by the National Orchestra of Porto, premiered in Casa da Música, Porto, in April 2010.
- "Chants de Teika" (2011), a song cycle for mezzo-soprano and piano upon old Japanese poems by Teika. Work dedicated to the singer Mariana Rewerski and the pianist Victoria Harmandjieva. Premiere scheduled for November 2011 at Vevey (Switzerland).
- "Six mélodies japonaises" (2011), for mezzo-soprano, guitar, barythone saxofone and piano. Commissioned by the Grupo Síntese (Guarda, Portugal). Premiered in Guarda, 5 November 2011.
- "Música de cena para Santo Antão" (2012), for flute/picc, B flat/E flat clarinet, piano, violin and cello. Commissioned by the Sond’Ar-te Electric Ensemble. Premiered in Cascais, Portugal, 1 June 2012.
- "Quatro canções para Inês" (2013), for soprano and piano. Commissioned by the Cistermúsica Festival. Premiered in Alcobaça, Portugal, 18 July 2013.
- "A Wilde Mass" (2014), for 12 vocal soloists and organ. Commissioned by Ensemble Musicatreize (Marseilles). Premiered in Marseilles, 30 June 2014 (further concerts in Avignon and Riga).
- "Elegias Chinesas", for coloratura soprano and chamber orchestra. Commissioned by Remix Ensemble, Casa da Música (Porto). Premiered in Casa da Música, 18 November 2014.
- "Paysages" (2015), for recorder and pianoforte. Commissioned by Helena Marinho and António Carrilho, with the support of the Portuguese Secretary of State for Culture (DGArtes).
- "Lumine Clarescet" (2015), for 18 mixed voices. Commissioned by the chamber choir Les Éléments from Toulouse (France). Premiered in Toulouse, 5 May 2015.

== Published works ==
- Songs of the Beginning, DONEMUS, Amsterdam 1996.
- Trois Consolations, FERMATA, Porto 1999.
- Moh, FERMATA, Porto 1999.
- Sept Épigrammes de Platon, MUSICOTECA, Lisboa 1999.
- Melodias Estranhas, FERMATA, Porto 2001.
- Quatrains du secret estude, FERMATA, Porto, 2004.
- Four Cartoons, INSTITUTO DAS ARTES, Lisbon, 2006.
- Aquilo que voa..., FERMATA, Porto, 2010.

On CD:

- Piano Sonata, by Nancy Lee Harper. NUMÉRICA Editora.
- Altro, by Jorge Salgado and Helena Marinho, NUMÉRICA Editora.
- 4 Cartoons, by Pedro Carneiro, Deux-Elles, UK.
- Angkor, by Hugo Diogo and Joanathan Ayest, NUMÉRICA Editora.
- As Feiticeiras/Les Sorcières, Ensemble Musicatreize, ACTES-SUD.
- Cassandra's Songs, by Isabel Nogueira and António Chagas Rosa, NUMÉRICA editora.
- Moh, Klangforum Wien, Pascal Rophé, PORTUGALER.
- Tombeau de Marie Stuart, Remix Ensemble, Peter Rundel, PORTUGALER.
- Cicuta, by Ana Barros and António Oliveira, PORTUGALER.
- Sept Épigrammes de Platon, by Ana Barros and António Oliveira, PORTUGALER.
- A boca, by Roberto Erculiani, PORTUGALER.
- ...aquilo que voa, Orquestra Sinfónica da Casa da Música, Christopher Köning, ED. CASA DA MÚSICA.
- Lumine Clarescet, by Joël Suhubiette and the chamber choir Les Éléments, Toulouse (France); MIRARE, 2017.
