= La Commedia =

Opera by Louis Andriessen

- Opera by Louis Andriessen
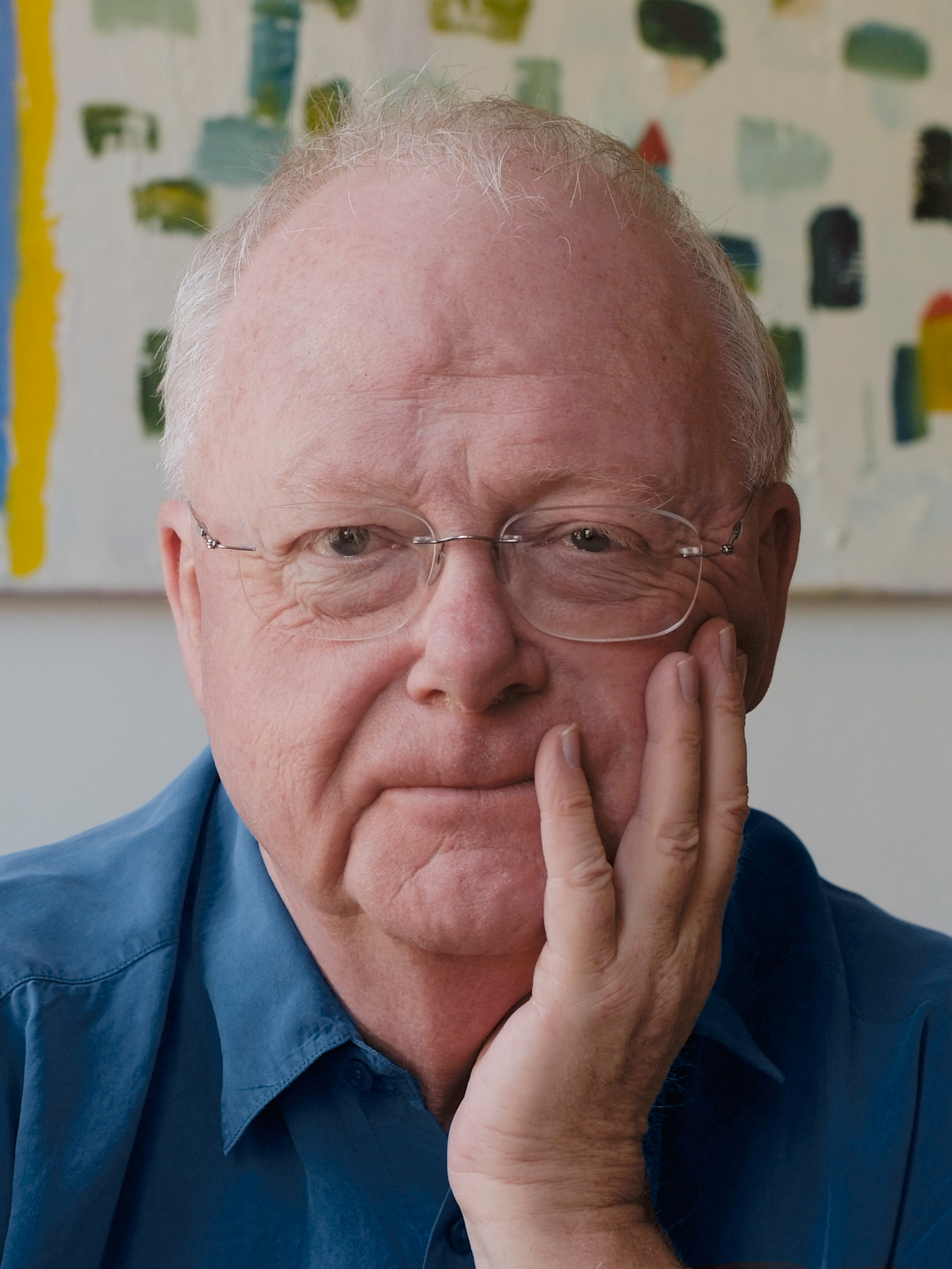
- Composer Louis Andriessen in 2008
- Librettist: Louis Andriessen
- Based on: Divine Comedy by Dante Alighieri
- Premiere: 12 June 2008; Koninklijk Theater Carré, Amsterdam

La Commedia is an opera in five parts composed by Louis Andriessen. A retelling of Dante's Divine Comedy, the multi-language libretto was constructed by Andriessen using extracts from Dante's poem as well as several other sources including the Old Testament and the poetry of Joost van den Vondel. Andriessen describes the work as a "film opera" and collaborated closely with film director Hal Hartley in its development. La Commedia premiered on 12 June 2008 at the Koninklijk Theater Carré in Amsterdam.

== Performance history ==
Following its Amsterdam premiere, La Commedia was performed in 2010 in concert version but with the same cast and musicians at the Disney Concert Hall in Los Angeles and Carnegie Hall in New York. It received a further concert performance in London at the Barbican in 2016 performed by the BBC Symphony Orchestra with Cristina Zavalloni and Claron McFadden reprising their original roles as Dante and Beatrice. The opera won the 2011 Grawemeyer Award for Music Composition, and in 2014 the recording of the premiere production was released on CD and DVD.

== Roles ==
| Role | Voice type | Premiere cast, 12 June 2008 (Conductor: Reinbert de Leeuw) |
|---|---|---|
| Dante | mezzo-soprano | Cristina Zavalloni |
| Beatrice | soprano | Claron McFadden |
| Lucifer | baritone | Jeroen Willems |
| Casella, Dante's dead friend | tenor | Marcel Beekman |
Chorus of men and women, chorus of children

== Reception ==
Ivan Hewett of The Telegraph wrote, “Like all Andriessen’s best pieces, this showed a man constantly engaged, in the most passionate terms, with the unfathomable dichotomies of human life; passion versus rationality, matter versus spirit, life and death.” Andrew Clements of The Guardian rated the Dutch National Opera set four out of five stars and argued, “The tone is wonderfully varied – sometimes profoundly serious, sometimes wildly exuberant or irreverent – matched to a score that is equally diverse and eclectic.” In the Los Angeles Times, Mark Swed lauded it as a “profoundly moving, if slyly unsentimental, meditation on life, love and death [...] it is Andriessen’s “Italian” opera and has the depth, musical richness and (I predict) lasting power of late Verdi.” Swed praised “the humor, the ingratiating jazziness, the terrible fury and, in the end, the ravishing grace of the later scenes.“ In a 2019 poll of critics and editors of The Guardian, the opera was ranked the seventh greatest classical composition of the 21st century, with Clements referring to the score as “wonderfully polyglot”.
