= Theatre of the World =

Opera by Louis Andriessen

Theatre of the World A Grotesque Stagework in 9 Scenes
- Opera by Louis Andriessen
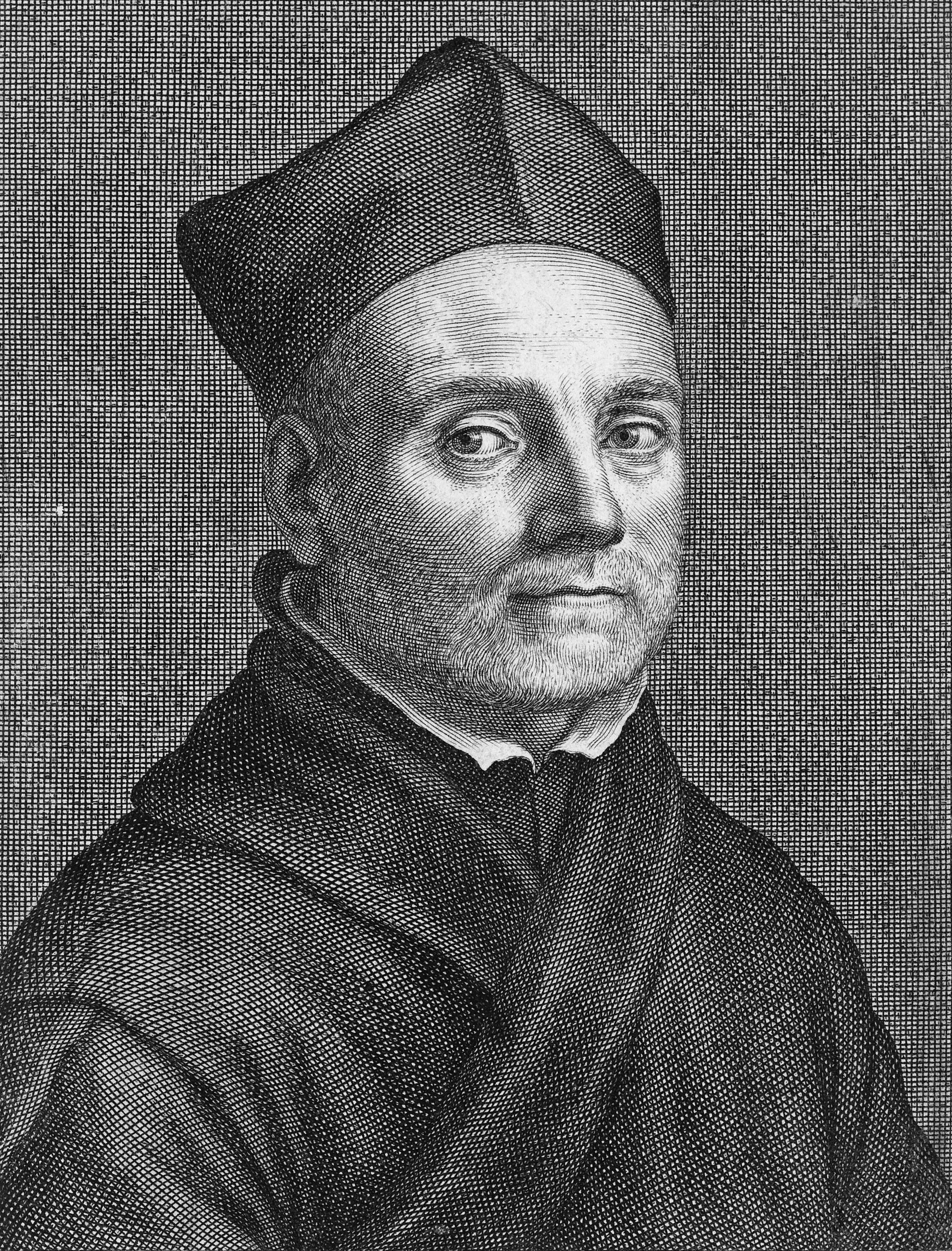
- Athanasius Kircher, the main character
- Librettist: Helmut Krausser
- Language: Multiple Language
- Based on: Life of Athanasius Kircher
- Premiere: 6 May 2016; Los Angeles

Theatre of the World is the fifth and last opera by Dutch composer Louis Andriessen, with a libretto by Helmut Krausser. Subtitled A Grotesque Stagework in 9 Scenes, the work concerns itself with the life of 17th-century Jesuit scholar Athanasius Kircher and was premiered at the Walt Disney Concert Hall in Los Angeles 6 May 2016, a co-production between Los Angeles Philharmonic and Dutch National Opera, conducted by Reinbert de Leeuw. The title alludes to the Catholic idea that life is a great play with God as the author, a concept also found in Shakespeare's "All the world's a stage" passage.

== Roles ==
Roles, voice types and premiere cast
Role	Voice type	Premiere cast, 6 May 2016 Conductor: Reinbert de Leeuw
Athanasius Kircher	baritone	Leigh Melrose
The Boy	soprano	Lindsay Kesselman
Pope Innocenzo XI	tenor	Marcel Beekman
Sor Juana Inés de la Cruz	voice	Cristina Zavalloni
Janssonius	spoken	Steven Van Watermeulen
Carnifex	baritone	Mattijs van de Woerd
Voltaire	voice	Timur
Descartes	voice	Tim Gonzales
Goethe	voice	David Castillo
Leibniz	voice	Scott Graff
Witch	voice	Charlotte Houberg
Witch	voice	Sophie Fetokaki
Witch	voice	Ingeborg Bröchler
'He'	voice	Martijn Cornet
'She'	voice	Nora Fischer

== Synopsis ==
Kircher, aged 76, meets a boy of about twelve years who we learn is the devil. He takes the unsuspecting Kircher, together with his patron Pope Innocent XI (who cannot see the boy), on a magical journey through ancient Egypt, China and Babylon. Kircher was renowned for building fanciful theories based on weak material and as the journey unfolds his outlandish ideas begin to unravel before our eyes. Kircher starts to become increasingly anxious and suspicious. We learn that earlier in his life, Kircher had mistakenly given his soul to the devil instead of to God during his narrow escape from Protestant mercenaries. The boy now curses Kircher and orders him to be broken by illness. On his deathbed Kircher requests the hangman to cut out his heart and take it to a shrine of the Virgin. On doing so, the boy grabs the heart and eats it only to discover that Kircher's soul has evaded him.

The opera is scored for the singers and full orchestra plus eight guest musicians playing: clarinet, bass clarinet, alto saxophone, tenor saxophone, percussion, keyboards, bass guitar and electric guitar.

== Reception ==
There was a mixed reception to the stage work and subsequent CD release. Gramophone wrote that Andriessen's score was "Immediate, transparent and almost disarmingly direct" while Opera News noted Andriessen was trying a softer approach: "A welcome change from his works' usual sensory overload, though the score drags during its many bland transitional passages." Music & Literature said "Marked by a consistency of texture and polished with stunning orchestrational élan, Andriessen's music managed to effectively underscore the truly grotesque array of action on stage, while somehow remaining elegant at all times. It was stunning." The Guardian said of the recording "a superb surreal journey". The Los Angeles Times claims it will "stand the test of time".

== Language ==
Krausser's libretto is written in seven languages. German is the most frequent while English, Latin, Spanish, Old Dutch, Italian and French can occur mid-sentence. Kircher's first line for example "..In questa necropoli I enjoy my melancholy". Stageraw's Myron Meisel wrote "It's all too polyglot and prolix to be considered a masterpiece, let alone accessible.."
