= Cornelis de Bondt =

Dutch composer

Cornelis de Bondt (born 9 December 1953) is a Dutch composer. Born in The Hague, de Bondt attended the Royal Conservatory there and currently teaches composition and music theory at the same institution.

In 2011 all of de Bondt's scores were withdrawn by the composer as a protest against arts funding cuts in the Netherlands. He has stated that he now sees the orchestral "score", the music in fixed notated form, as a symbol of neo-liberalism, and is therefore exploring non-fixed notational methods.

== Works ==
Compositions by Cornelis de Bondt include the following:

- Bint, written for Hoketus (1979-1980)
- Karkas, for large ensemble (1981-1983, first performed Holland Festival, 10 June 2002)
- The Broken Ear, cycle of works (1984-1996)
- Bloed, for voices and orchestra (1997–2001)
- Bloed II, written for the Hilliard Ensemble and Netherlands Wind Ensemble (1997–98)
- Die wahre Art, piano concerto (2000)
- Gli toccha la mano, written for Cristina Zavalloni, Orkest de Volharding and Icebreaker (2002)
- Gran Sinfonia – Il tempo giusto, for orchestra (2010)
