= Writing to Vermeer =

1999 opera by Louis Andriessen

- Opera by Louis Andriessen
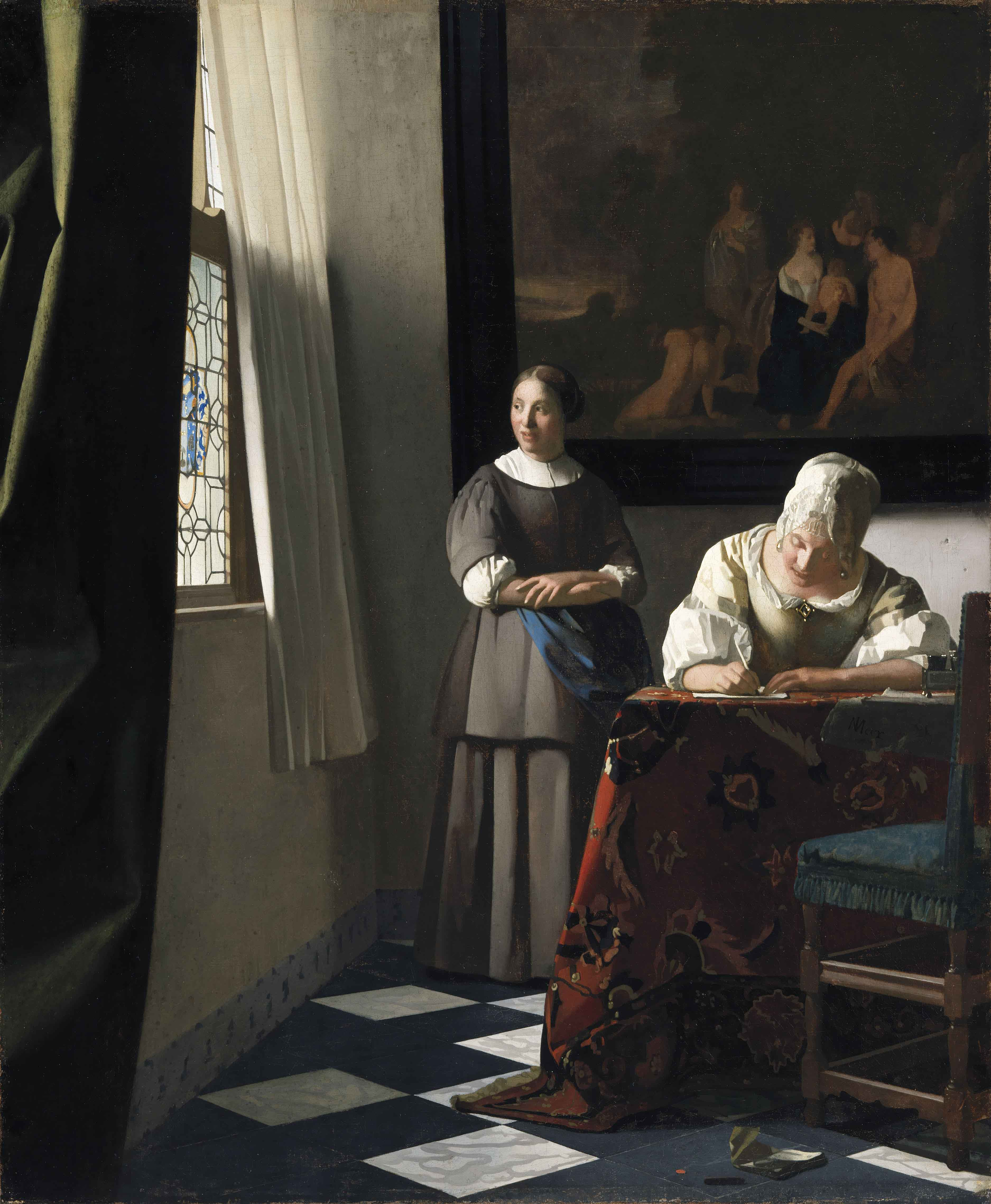
- Lady Writing a Letter with her Maid, one of several paintings by Vermeer which inspired the opera's libretto
- Librettist: Peter Greenaway
- Language: English
- Premiere: 1 December 1999; Het Muziektheater, Amsterdam

Writing to Vermeer is an opera in six scenes composed by Louis Andriessen with incidental electronic music by Michel van der Aa. The English-language libretto, inspired by the paintings of Johannes Vermeer, was written by Peter Greenaway. Saskia Boddeke directed the premiere production at the Dutch National Opera on 1 December 1999.

== Background and performance history ==
Writing to Vermeer was Andriessen's third collaboration with British film director and screenwriter Peter Greenaway. Set in the Delft household of the Dutch painter Johannes Vermeer in May 1672, Writing to Vermeer is composed for three women, two sopranos and a mezzo-soprano, each of whom writes six letters to Vermeer in his absence. Several of Vermeer's paintings portray women writing or reading letters, including Lady Writing a Letter with her Maid, The Love Letter, and A Lady Writing a Letter. Andriessen said of his decision to accept Greenaway's proposal for the libretto: "I feel very close to the attitude of [Vermeer] who fixes on his canvas brief 'stolen' moments that are eternally beautiful."

Although the story is imaginary, two of the characters, Vermeer's wife Catherine Bolnes and her mother Maria Thins, are real historical figures. The third, his model Saskia, is fictional. The chosen year for the setting, 1672, is known as the "Disaster Year" of Dutch history when the country suffered military defeats and serious civil unrest with large parts of the country deliberately flooded to prevent the advancement of the French troops. As Bernard Holland observed, the cataclysmic events outside the walls of Vermeer's house serve as the backdrop against which the women's letters about everyday domestic life and Vermeer's own quiet paintings of interiors are contrasted. However, the opera's tragic ending reflects the final intrusion of chaos from the world outside, chaos which ultimately ruined Vermeer's life.

The Greenaway/Boddeke production with sets and lighting by Michael Simon and costumes by Emi Wada includes ten film "inserts" by Boddeke which depict the violence going on outside the house and are projected on a screen behind the singers. The cast of singers is augmented by dancers depicting the female subjects in Vermeer's paintings such as The Milkmaid. They occasionally "freeze" in the same pose depicted in the painting. The production travelled to Australia in March 2000 for the Adelaide Festival and then to New York City in July of that year for its US premiere at the New York State Theater. In 2004 Writing to Vermeer was revived by the Dutch National Opera and a studio recording with the original cast was made for the Nonesuch label.

== Roles ==
Roles, voice types and premiere cast
Role	Voice type	Premiere cast, 1 December 1999 Conductor: Reinbert de Leeuw
Catherine Bolnes, Vermeer's wife	soprano	Susan Narucki
Maria Thins, Vermeer's mother-in-law	mezzo-soprano	Susan Bickley
Saskia de Vries, Vermeer's model	soprano	Barbara Hannigan
Two of Vermeer's children, chorus of women

== Recordings ==
- Andriessen: Writing to Vermeer – Susan Narucki, Susan Bickley, Barbara Hannigan; Dutch National Opera and the ASKO and Schoenberg Ensemble conducted by Reinbert de Leeuw. Label: Nonesuch Records

== See also ==
- Johannes Vermeer in popular culture
