= Diderik Wagenaar =

Dutch composer and musical theorist

Diderik Wagenaar (born 10 May 1946 in Utrecht) is a Dutch composer and musical theorist.

== Life and work ==
Wagenaar has lived and worked all his adult life in The Hague. Born to a musical family that includes Johan Wagenaar, he began playing piano at the age of eight and by the time he was fourteen had set his sights on a musical vocation. As a teenager in the early 1960s he loved Renaissance music, Bach, Ravel, and Thelonious Monk; at the age of eighteen he began studying music theory with Jan van Dijk, Hein Kien and Rudolf Koumans and piano with Simon Admiraal at the Royal Conservatory in The Hague. As a composer he is essentially self-taught.

It was during his student's chamaar years in the mid-60s that Wagenaar began to develop as a composer. Although fascinated by the concerts given by Pierre Boulez and Bruno Maderna with the Hague Philharmonic, he admits to having "no real grip" at that time on the musical avant-garde, and began to look around for other starting-points for his own music. In addition to his fascination with jazz, an important encounter at that time was with the music of Charles Ives, which taught him the value of inclusivity. It also encouraged his tendency to attempt a synthesis between tonality and atonality, to connect previously disparate systems of musical thought. Today Wagenaar feels that the notion of a "music of inclusion" can be seen as an important aspect of the new Dutch music as a whole.

His music is closely linked with that of his friend Louis Andriessen and treats similar ideas in perhaps an even more rigorous manner. Though the ideas may be complex, they are always presented in a clear and straightforward manner. His other influences include Stravinsky, a key figure for the composers of the Hague school, but also importantly Monk and John Coltrane.

His works include commissions for the ensembles Orkest de Volharding, Hoketus, Slagwerkgroep den Haag and Icebreaker and for the Concertgebouw Orchestra.

== Works ==
- 2010-2014 Canzone sull' Infinito, for voices and orchestra
- 2012 ....e mi sovvien...., for instrumental ensemble
- 2008-2009 Preludio all'infinito, for orchestra
- 2007-2008 Quadrivium (formerly known as Estensione), for two pianos
- 2006 Libro di melodie, for piano solo
- 2005-2006 Ricordanza (Ríevocazioni dell’Orfeo di Claudio Monteverdi), for orchestra
- 2003 Tango waltz, Scherzo da ballo, for orchestra
- 2002 Pantomima, for large ensemble (Orkest de Volharding in collaboration with Icebreaker)
- 1998-2000 Galilei (on texts by Galileo Galilei, Roberto Bellarmino, Blaise Pascal), for orchestra
- 1998 Rookery Hill, for ensemble (Icebreaker)
- 1998 Musica dopo l'epistola, for brass quintet
- 1995 (revised 1996) La caccia, for trombone
- 1995 Trois poèmes en prose (on a text by Baudelaire), for soprano and orchestra
- 1994 Cat music, for two violins
- 1994 Speld, for music box
- 1993 Lent, vague, indécis, for instrumental ensemble
- 1992 Solenne, for six percussionists
- 1991 Le chat (from album Tien vocale minuten), for mezzo-soprano
- 1990 Tessituur, for orchestra
- 1989 La volta, for piano solo
- 1988 Triforium, and wind orchestra and percussion
- 1988 Festinalente, for solo trumpet with brass orchestra and percussion
- 1987 Schigolch, two voices and two mouth organs and string or wind instrument
- 1985 (revised 1986) Limiet, for string quartet
- 1985 Crescent, for 34 wind instruments
- 1981-1984 (revised 1986) Metrum, for symphony orchestra and obligato saxophone quartet (arranged in 1995 by John Godfrey, for ensemble (Icebreaker))
- 1981 Stadium, for two pianos
- 1972-1980 Canapé, romantic music for piano, clarinet, violin and cello
- 1979 Vier min één, three pieces for three trumpets
- 1979 Tam Tam, for 12 instrumentalists (Hoketus)
- 1976 (revised 1978) Liederen, for brass instruments, two pianos and double bass (Orkest de Volharding)
- 1975 Tango for Jet, for ensemble (Orkest de Volharding)
- 1973 (revised 1990) Praxis, symphony for two grand pianos with oboe ad libitum
- 1969 Kaleidofonen I, for alto saxophone and piano
- ? 2 liedjes: Slaapliedje voor Emanuel - Cradle song, for voice solo

== Recordings ==
- Huib Emmer • Diderik Wagenaar • Gilius van Bergeijk includes Kaleidofonen I performed by Gilius van Bergeijk (alto sax) and Gerard Bouwhuis (piano). LP, Ooyevaer Disk 36-31
- Diderik Wagenaar: Composers' Voice Portrait Gerard Bouwhuis, Netherlands Wind Ensemble and Radio Symphony Orchestra, conducted by Geert Van Keulen, Arie Van Beek, and Lucas Vis. La Volta, Stadium, Solenne, Liederen (Canzonas) and Metrum. Donemus CV 29
- Diderik Wagenaar: Composers' Voice Portrait Ensemble Icebreaker. Metrum (arr. John Godfrey), Rookery Hill and Tam Tam. Donemus CV 94
- ConSequenze includes La caccia. Done Composers' Voice KN2. Key Notes (Donemus' magazine) - Special release for subscribers only
- Wie is bang voor Nederlandse muziek? includes Rookery Hill by Wagenaar performed by Ensemble Icebreaker (same recording as on Donemus CV 94). Donemus NM Classics 93007
- Radio Kamer Orkest - Ernest Bour • Ed Spanjaard • Groot Omroepkoor - Kees van Baaren • Peter Schat • Theo Loevendie • Diderik Wagenaar - Aspects of Music from the Netherlands 17 includes Tessituur performed by Radio Kamer Orkest conducted by Ed Spanjaard. BFO/Radio Nederland
- Music Box - 32 composities voor muziekdoos includes Speld. VPRO EigenWijs EW 9413
- Rumori - De organisatie van geluid... - 1995/1996 includes Cat Music performed by Marijke van Kooten and Marin Mars
