= Richard Ayres =

British composer and music teacher

Richard Ayres (born 29 October 1965) is a British composer and music teacher.

== Biography ==
Born in Cornwall, England, Richard Ayres followed Morton Feldman's classes at the Darmstadt and Dartington summer schools. He studied composition, electronic music, and trombone at Huddersfield Polytechnic until 1989, graduating with distinction in 1989. Since September 1989, Ayres has lived and worked in the Netherlands. He studied postgraduate composition course at the Royal Conservatory of The Hague, studying with Louis Andriessen, and graduating in 1992.

From 1990 Richard Ayres has worked as composer receiving performances from among others the ASKO Ensemble, the Schönberg Ensemble, Ives Ensemble, Orkest de Volharding, Maarten Altena Ensemble, The Netherlands Ballet Orchestra, Netherlands Radio Symphony Orchestra, City of Birmingham Symphony Orchestra, Apartment House, London Sinfonietta, Klangforum Wien, pianist Ananda Sukarlan, MusikFabrik, Continuum (Canada) as well as writing for ensembles with more unusual instrumentations formed for specific projects.

Ayres received the Gaudeamus International Composers Award for composition in 1994. His piece No. 31 (for trumpet and ensemble) received a recommendation at the UNESCO Rostrum of Composers in Paris in 1999. He received the Matthijs Vermeulen Award in 2003.

He was Featured Composer at the Huddersfield Festival in 2003 and his music has been heard at the Aldeburgh Festival: his first opera, The Cricket Recovers was premiered there in 2005. It has since had new productions in Stuttgart, Weimar and Braunschweig. His second opera is Peter Pan (Staatsoper Stuttgart/Komische Oper Berlin/Welsh National Opera and Royal Opera House, 2015).

In the orchestral arena his No. 37b for orchestra was premiered at the Donaueschingen Musiktage by the SWR Sinfonieorchester Freiburg and Baden-Baden and has since been taken up by the Frankfurt Radio Symphony and the BBC Scottish Symphony Orchestra. No. 40 NONcerto for oboe and chamber orchestra was premiered by Baart Schneemann and the Netherlands Radio Chamber Orchestra in 2006.

2008 saw the premiere of No. 42 In the Alps for soprano and ensemble which was premiered and toured throughout the Netherlands by Barbara Hannigan and the Netherlands Wind Ensemble. He also wrote No. 43 Glorious, a work for chamber ensemble and film – a collaboration with film-maker Guy Maddin for the SHIFT Festival in Amsterdam and Canada.

His piece No. 52 (Three pieces about Ludwig van Beethoven: dreaming, hearing loss and saying goodbye) was given its world premiere at the BBC Proms on 20 September 2020 at the Royal Albert Hall, London, performed by the Aurora Orchestra conducted by Nicholas Collon. That and the piece's second performance were given five-star reviews by The Times and The Daily Telegraph who, respectively, described the piece as "startlingly joyous" and "deeply moving... [m]agnificent".

In January 2004, Ayres was appointed as teacher of composition at the Royal Conservatory of The Hague. He remained in his position here until 2006 and now teaches at the Amsterdam Conservatoire.

== Selected works ==
- No. 8 Piano (solo) 1991 (written for the Indonesian pianist Ananda Sukarlan
- No. 24 (NONcerto for alto trombone) 1995
- No. 31 (NONcerto for trumpet) 1999
- No. 30 (NONcerto for orchestra, cello and high soprano) 2003
- No. 30a "Schnell aber nicht immer"
- No. 33 a-b-c (Valentine Tregashian COnsiders...) 2001
- No. 36 (NONcerto for horn) 2002
- No. 34b (Two pieces for cello and ensemble) 2003
- No. 39 The Cricket Recovers 2005
- No. 37b for Orchestra 2006
- No. 40 (NONcerto for oboe)2006
- No. 41 (Five Memos for Eva) 2007
- No. 42 (In the Alps- an animated concert) 2008
- No. 43 (Glorious) 2008
- No. 47 (Peter Pan) 2015
- No. 48 (Night Studio) 2015
- No. 52 (Three pieces about Ludwig van Beethoven: dreaming, hearing loss and saying goodbye) 2020
