= De Materie =

Four-part vocal and orchestral work by Louis Andriessen

- Theatrical work by Louis Andriessen
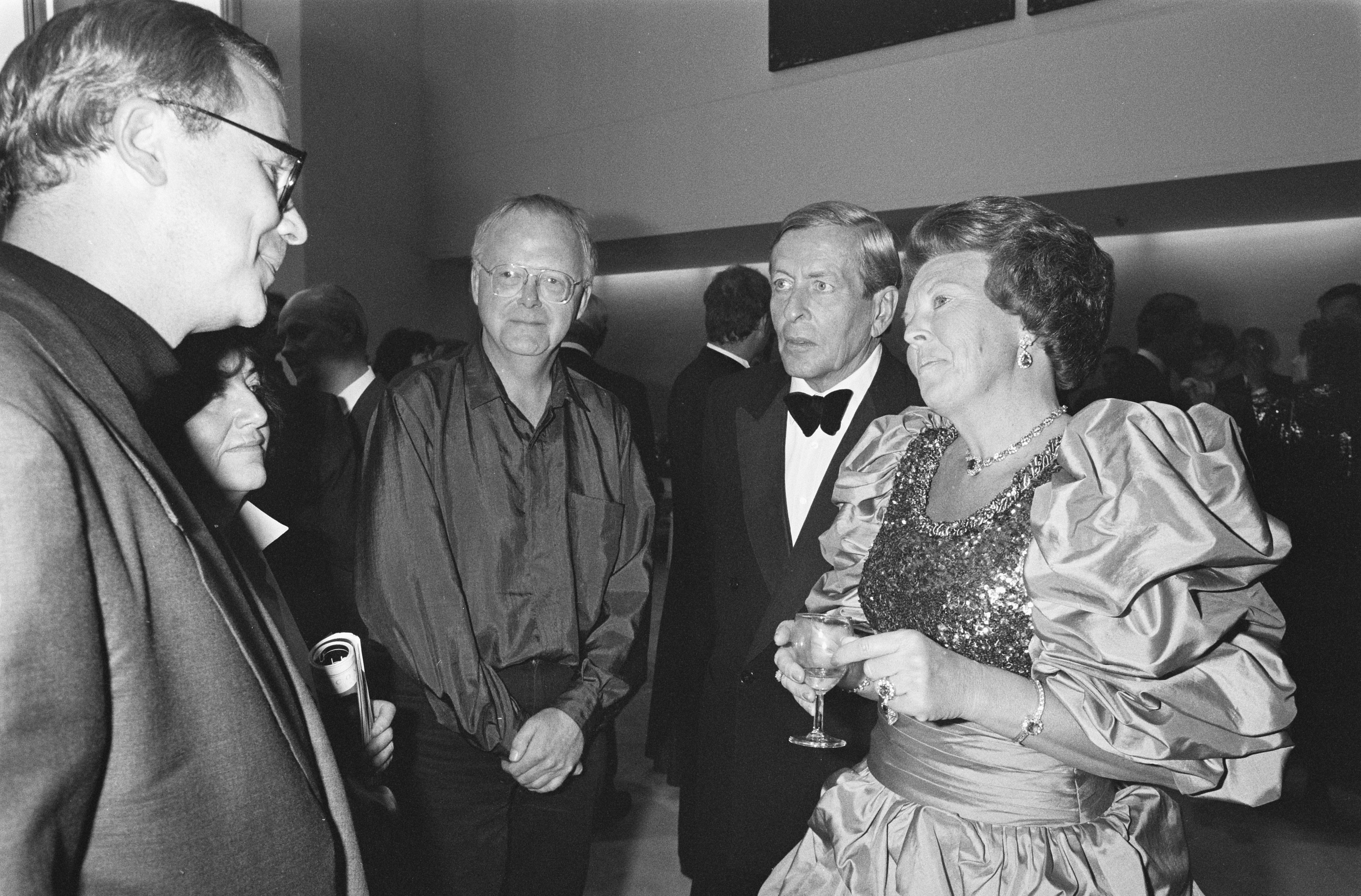
- First staging of De Materie (Amsterdam, 1989), with Robert Wilson, Louis Andriessen, Prince Claus of the Netherlands and Queen Beatrix of the Netherlands
- Premiere: 1 June 1989; Muziektheater, Amsterdam

De Materie (Matter) is a four-part vocal and orchestral work by Dutch composer Louis Andriessen, written over the period 1984 to 1988. While many consider this work to be an opera, Andriessen classifies it as a "large theatrical four-part work" and not an opera. The title of the work was inspired by a moment when Andriessen had observed a contrabassoon and a double bass performing in an orchestra together. He realized that while the two instruments are from different families and do not make sound in the same way, they are both made of wood, or the same "matter".

Robert Wilson directed the first staging of the theatrical work on 1 June 1989 at the Muziektheater, Amsterdam, with James Doing, Wendy Hill, Beppie Blankert and Marjon Brandsma as the soloists at the premiere. In the US, part 2 of the work, "Hadewijch", was performed at the Tanglewood Festival in 1994. The complete work received its first US performance in 2004 at Lincoln Center, New York City. "Hadewijch" received its UK premiere at the 1993 Huddersfield Contemporary Music Festival. The UK premiere of the full work was at the Meltdown Festival in 1994.

The work incorporates eclectic musical influences, ranging from Johann Sebastian Bach and Igor Stravinsky to the old Netherlands chanson "L'homme armé" and 20th-century boogie-woogie. The work opens with 144 iterations of the same chord played fortissimo (very loud) and features an extended solo for two large metal boxes played with hammers. The texts are both sung and spoken. The four sections of the work incorporate various texts, with the dates of composition of each section in parentheses:

- Part 1 ("De Materie", 1986–1987): the 1581 Plakkaat van Verlatinge (Act of Abjuration), with a text on shipbuilding by Nicolaes Witsen and the Idea Physicæ of David van Goorle – 25:29
- Part 2 ("Hadewijch", 1987–1988): Zevende Visioen (Seventh Vision) by Hadewijch – 28:47
- Part 3 ("De Stijl", 1984–1985): text from The Principles of Plastic Mathematics by M. H. J. Schoenmaekers, along with quotes by M. van Domselaer-Middelkoop about his friend, the Dutch painter Piet Mondrian – 25:54
- Part 4 (untitled): excerpts from two sonnets by Willem Kloos, along with a passage from the diary of Marie Curie and her Nobel Prize speech – 28:04

(Timings in minutes and seconds, from the Nonesuch CD listed below)

== Structure ==
Andriessen composed the piece in 4 parts, which he realized later in life that the number 4 in Christianity is representative of all earthly things, making this an apt fit for something entitled "matter". The third part, "De Stijl", had been written in performed before he had even begun working on the three other parts.

Andriessen likened the different parts of De Materie to movements of a symphony. Each movement's tempo was selected very specifically using math and ratios, for Andriessen was trying to depict balance even through these minute details. He had a strong focus on the ratio of 1:2:3:4. The tempi of the movements represent the reverse of this, with the first movement having the fastest tempo and the last having the slowest. His rhythms also represented this, with the smallest division of the beat being 8th notes in the first movement and the smallest division of the beat being sextuplets in the final part. Each section is approximately 25 minutes in length, as this creates balance, and when all of the parts add up it creates approximately 100 minutes. He also stated once that while the four parts are all part of something bigger, they also can each be performed as a standalone piece.

Movement	Tempo	Note Value	Smallest Subdivision of Beat
Part 1	144 bpm	Eighth Notes = 288	2 notes per beat
Hadewijch	108 bpm	Triplets = 324	3 notes per beat
De Stijl	90 bpm	Sixteenth Notes = 360	4 notes per beat
Part 4	72 bpm	Sextuplets = 432	6 notes per beat

=== Part 2: Hadewijch ===
Part 2 is titled Hadewijch. The name comes from a Dutch poet with the same name, whose work had fascinated Andriessen. He uses the text from her Seventh Vision, which was one of the many visions she had experienced and written about during the medieval age. The text depicts the bond between courtly love and divine love and while it describes physical interactions with a man, Andriessen believed that the "he" within the text could be interpreted as relating to God as well.

Another large inspiration for the movement was Reims Cathedral, which Andriessen considered to be a masterpiece in architecture and had wanted to write a piece using the structure of the building as an inspiration. He used the same ratios used to create the cathedral in the way he composed the piece of music.

The main vision behind the piece was trying to represent the vision of Hadewijch walking through the Reims Cathedral. He represents every time she walks past a pillar with a "clock-like chord".

=== Part 3: De Stijl ===
The third part of the piece, titled De Stijl (The Style), was the first of the four parts to be written. Composed between 1984 and 1985 as a standalone piece for the nontraditional ensemble Kaalslag, Andriessen took inspiration from the Dutch painter Piet Mondrian. The title for the work comes from the Dutch art movement and journal that the painter frequently contributed to with the same name (De Stijl).

The piece evokes the style of the jazz genre "boogie woogie", for this was a reference to Mondrian's paintings titled Broadway Boogie Woogie and his unfinished work titled Victory Boogie Woogie. Andriessen had also decided that he would compose a Passacaglia, as Boogie Woogie originated from the Blues, which the composer observed shared similarities to the traditional classical form.

De Stijl also takes inspiration from Mathieu Schoenmaekers, whose book titled The Principles of Plastic Mathematics was very influential on Mondrian's paintings. He uses texts from this book for the choruses at the beginning and end of the movement. The form of the cross is also an idea taken from Schoenmaekers's writings, and is visually depicted by a dancer using a laser.

The form of the movement was determined by Andriessen using Mondrian's painting Composition with Red, Yellow, and Blue. The composer assigned different instrument groups to each color and mapped out when each group would play to align with Mondrian's painting. The work features a passacaglia using fugal techniques for a majority of the piece, featuring the chorus singing the words of Schoenmaekers in homophonic texture. In the middle of Part 3, the dancer raps along with an upright piano that is placed at the back of the room. This represents the cross musically as an interruption that then does not affect the line once it has passed, as the music returns to what it was once the moment has ended.

== Roles ==
Role	Staging Premiere Cast June 1, 1989 Conductor: Reinbert de Leeuw
Gorlaeus	James Doing
Hadewijch	Wendy Hill
Spreekster	Beppie Blankert
Madame Curie	Marjon Brandsma

== Recording ==
- Nonesuch Records 7559-79367-2: Susan Narucki, James Doing, Cindy Oswin, Gertrude Thoma; Members of the Netherlands Chamber Choir; Asko|Schönberg; Reinbert de Leeuw, conductor
