= Germino =

Germino is an Italian surname. Notable people with the surname include:

- Mark Germino (1950–2024), American folk-rock and country singer-songwriter
- Monica Germino (born 1974), Dutch-American violinist
