= Theatre of the world =

Theatre of the world (also theater of the world) may refer to:

- Theatrum Mundi, a metaphor in art and philosophy
- Theatrum Orbis Terrarum (1570), an atlas
- Theatre of the World (2016), an opera

== See also ==
- The Great Theater of the World (1634), a play
