= Huib Emmer =

Dutch composer

Huib Emmer (born 6 September 1951 in Utrecht) is a Dutch composer. He also plays electric guitar and electric bass guitar.

He performed at the Claxon Sound Festival -for improvised music (1984) in the Netherlands, and featured in The Best of the Claxon Festival (1984) voor VPRO-tv (1984) with the Huib Emmer Quinet Skid with Willem van der Ham (sax) Peter van Bergen (sax), Gerard Bouwhuis (keyboard) Hans van der Meer (drums) From 1976 to 1986 Emmer was a member of the Dutch minimal ensemble Hoketus and he has performed since 1988 in the ensemble LOOS. Since 1992 he has also composed for electronic media, often in combination with projected video or film.
