= Workers Union (Andriessen) =

1975 composition for any loud-sounding ensemble by Louis Andriessen

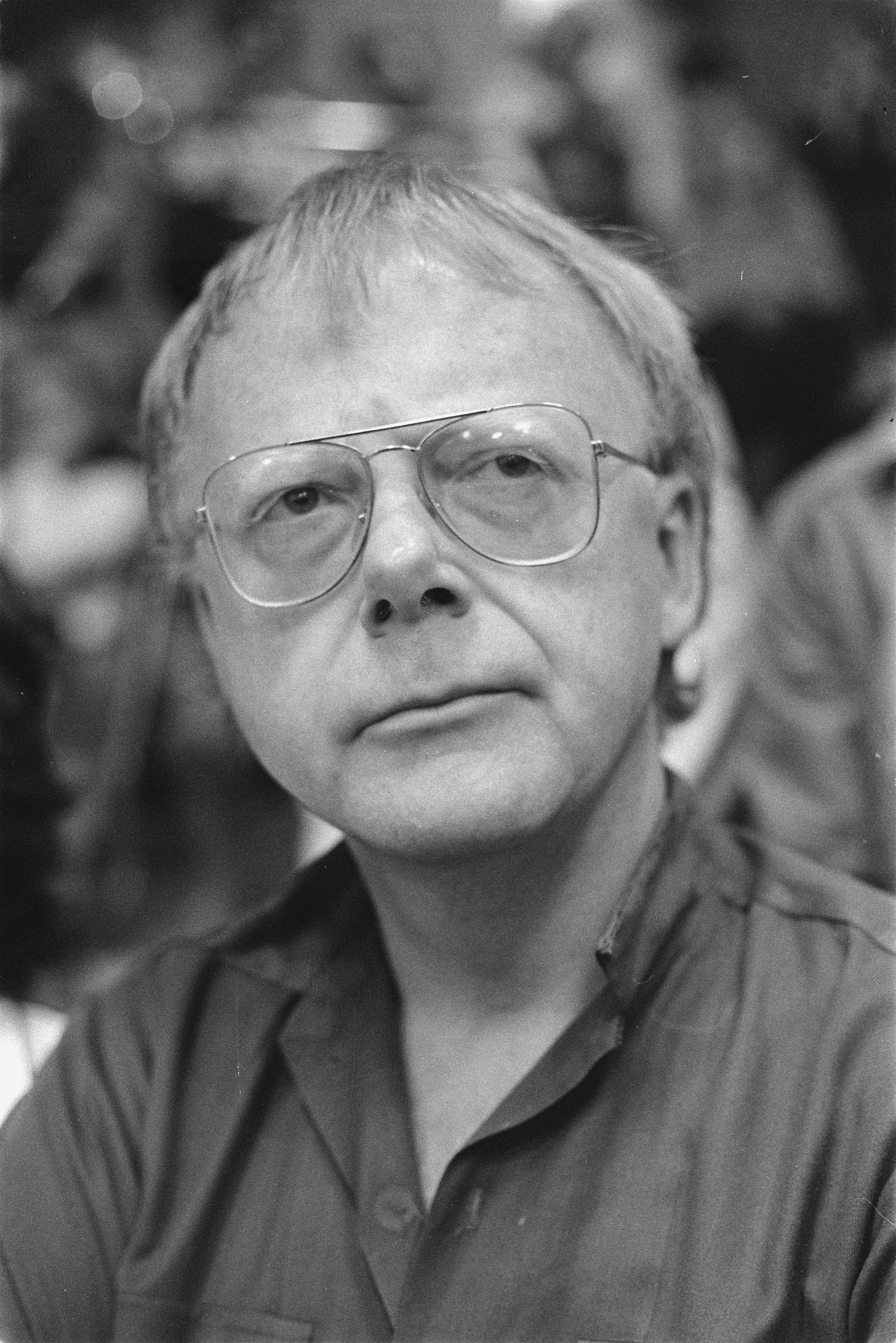
Louis Andriessen in 1983

Workers Union (1975) is a composition by Louis Andriessen intended for any loud-sounding group of instruments; Andriessen did not want to handicap orchestras by providing a list of instruments.

== Characteristics ==
It is a melodically indeterminate piece; this means there is no key and no defined melody. The piece is very strict rhythmically, with only a guide to lower or raise pitches. Sections may be repeated as many times as the conductor wishes, resulting in varying performance lengths. Every instrument plays different notes that follow the same rhythm and ascending or descending patterns. This creates an atonal piece with many polyphonic phrases. There are points in the piece where the ensemble splits into two groups. The groups alternate lines before coming back together again. If executed properly, the piece sounds mechanical as the instrumentation operates in perfect unison.

== Performance practice ==
Before simply playing the rhythms indicated on the score, each player must select a middle pitch. There is a single line through the center of the staff that indicates the aforementioned middle pitch – a pitch line. Each musician chooses their own pitch that will represent the midway point. Notes that are written above the line should be played higher than the preselected pitch and vice versa.

The musician must remember their middle pitch at all times. During long lines or complex rhythms, one must make sure there is adequate room between what they're playing and the pitch line.
