= Nora Fischer (singer) =

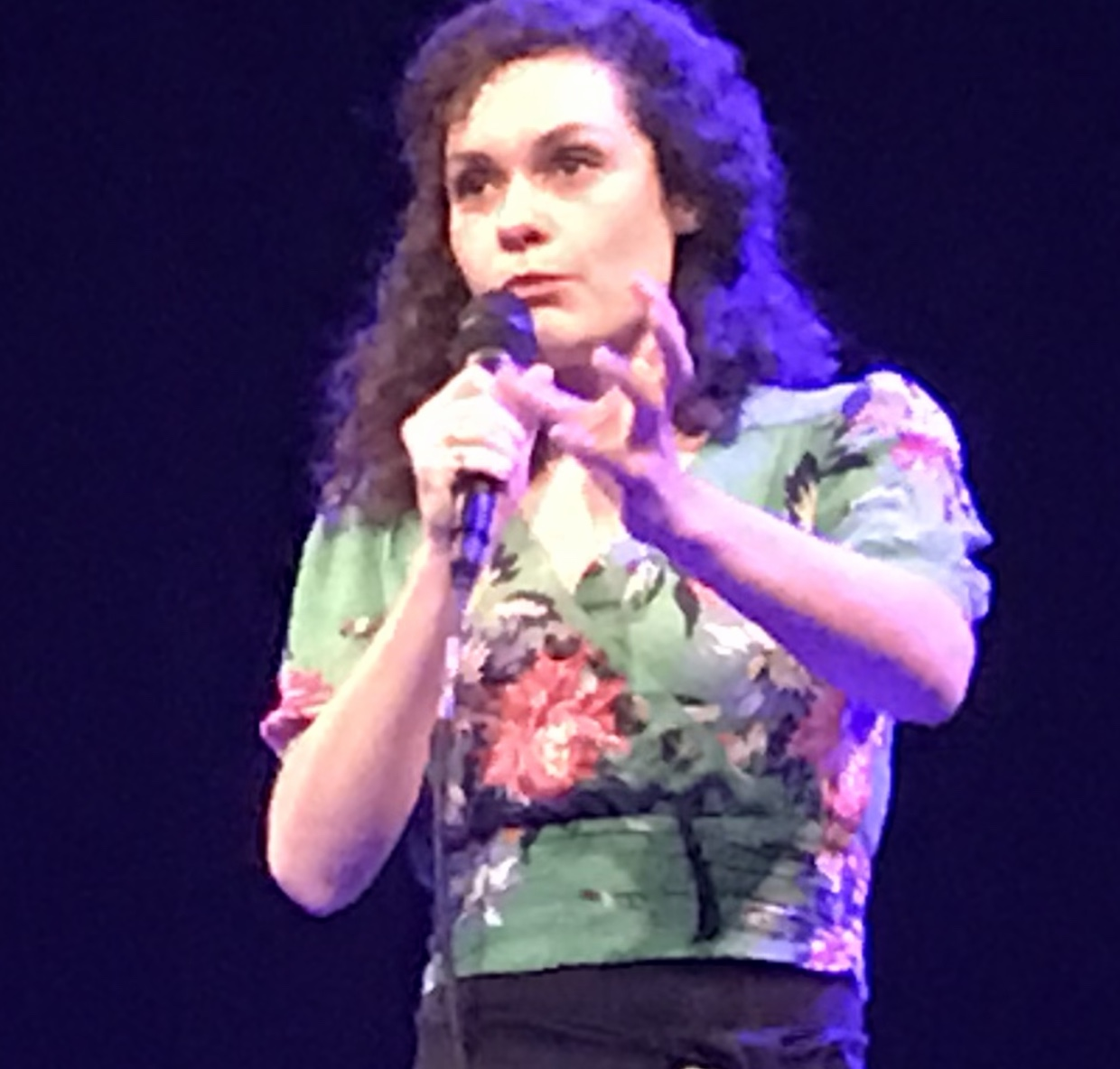

Background information
- Born: 1987 (age 38–39); Netherlands
- Genres: Classical music
- Occupation: Singer
- Website: http://norafischer.nl

Nora Fischer is a soprano singer. Her new album, HUSH, furthers her reputation as someone who breaks conventional musical genre barriers.

== Career ==
Nora Fischer attended conservatory in Amsterdam, but was "kicked out [...] after a single semester," because she didn't like the "typical classical way of singing." She studied musicology and philosophy at the University of Amsterdam, then studied music at the Complete Vocal Institute in Copenhagen, and later earned a Master's degree in New Audiences and Innovative Practice at the Royal Conservatoire of The Hague, in the Netherlands.

Nora Fischer has performed with many world-class orchestras and ensembles, including the Los Angeles Philharmonic, Kronos Quartet, Asko/Schönberg Ensemble, the Dutch National Opera, Stargaze and l’Arpeggiata, and in venues such as the Philharmonie de Paris and the Walt Disney Concert Hall in Los Angeles. She performs regularly with Yo-Yo Ma's Silkroad.

In 2017/2018, Nora Fischer undertook a 15-date tour as part of the ECHO Rising Stars scheme.

Nora Fischer sings music from the Renaissance and Baroque periods to contemporary music, and she has worked with a number of contemporary composers, including Steve Reich, David Lang, Michel van der Aa, and Nico Muhly. Louis Andriessen and Osvaldo Golijov have written works for her.

She has recorded several albums including The Secret Diary of Nora Plain, featuring music composed by Morris Kliphuis, on Excelsior Recordings in 2017; she also participated in a recording of works by her father, composer/conductor Iván Fischer: Iván Fischer: Composer’s Portrait, on Channel Classics in 2016. She signed with Universal Music in September, 2017, and subsequently released HUSH on Deutsche Grammophon, with guitarist Marnix Dorrestein, which is a modern take on songs by Monteverdi, Purcell, Dowland, and others, for soprano and electric guitar.

Composer Louis Andriessen wrote for her the song cycle The Only One, first performed on 2 May 2019 at Walt Disney Concert Hall, Los Angeles by Fischer with the Los Angeles Philharmonic, conducted by Esa-Pekka Salonen. The British premiere was at the Royal Albert Hall during the 2019 BBC Proms on 8 September 2019, with the BBC Symphony Orchestra under Sakari Oramo.
