= Kees van Baaren =

Dutch composer and teacher (1906–1970)

Kees van Baaren (Dutch pronunciation: [ˈkeːs fɑm ˈbaːrə(n)]; (Note: In isolation, van is pronounced [vɑn].) 22 October 1906 – 2 September 1970) was a Dutch composer and teacher.

== Early years ==
Van Baaren was born in Enschede. His early studies (1924–29) were in Berlin with Rudolph Breithaupt (piano) and Friedrich Koch (composition) at the Stern conservatory. After returning to the Netherlands in 1929, he studied with Willem Pijper. He adopted Pijper's "germ cell technique" in his compositions from about 1934 onward. While composing some works in an accessible, tonal style, in other pieces he developed a serial technique, which emerged fully with the Septet for five winds, violin, and double bass (1952).

== Career ==
In 1948 Van Baaren became director of the Conservatoire of the Amsterdam Muzieklyceum Society (later merged into the Conservatoire of Amsterdam). In 1953 he was appointed director of the Utrechts Conservatorium. In 1958 he became director of the Royal Conservatory of The Hague. His students included many of the leading composers and performers of the next generation, including Louis Andriessen, Reinbert de Leeuw, Misha Mengelberg, Peter Schat, and Jan van Vlijmen. He died in Oegstgeest. See: List of music students by teacher: A to B#Kees van Baaren.

== Selected works ==
- Concertino for piano and orchestra (1934)
- Sonatina in memoriam Willem Pijper, for piano (1948)
- The Hollow Men, cantata for soprano, baritone, mixed choir and orchestra, text by T. S. Eliot (1948, rev.1955-56)
- Septet for flute, oboe, clarinet, bassoon, horn, violin, and contrabass (1952)
- Symphony (1956)
- Variations for orchestra (1959)
- Music for Orchestra
- Partita for wind band (1961)
- String Quartet (1962)
- Wind Quintet (1963)
- Music for Carillon (1964)
- Concerto for piano and orchestra (1964)

== Sources ==
- Hill, Jackson. 1970. "The Music of Kees van Baaren: A Study of Transition in the Music of the Netherlands in the Second Third of the Twentieth Century". DMA diss. Chapel Hill: University of North Carolina.
- Kien, Hein. 1976. ‘The Composer Kees van Baaren: Towards a Revaluation of Sound Material’, Key Notes 4:4–18.
- Vermeulen, E. 1992. "Kees van Baaren's Antischool", Key Notes 26, no. 1:14–17.
- Wouters Jos. 1971. "Kees van Baaren". In Negen portretten van Nederlandse componisten, Dutch Composers' Gallery, 71–87. Amsterdam: Stichting Donemus.
- Wouters, Jos, and André Jurres (eds.) 1962. "Conversations with Dutch Composers: Kees van Baaren and Hans Henkemans". In Fifteen years Donemus, 1947–1962: Conversations with Dutch Composers / Gespräche mit niederländischen Komponisten, edited by Jos Wouters and André Jurres, translated by Ian F. Finlay (English) and Elisabeth Meter-Plaut (German), 50–59. Amsterdam: Stichting Donemus.
