= Rosa – A Horse Drama =

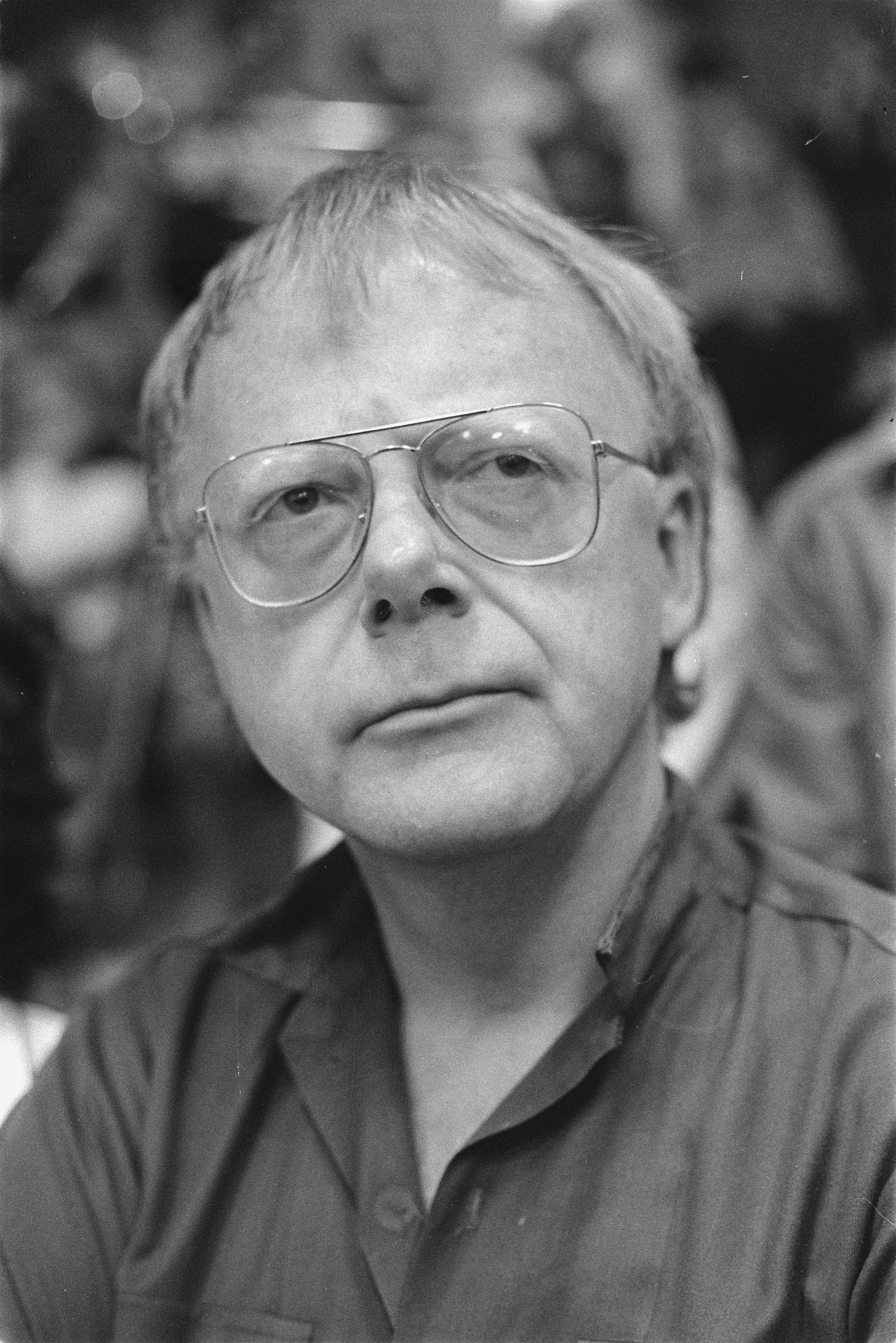
Louis Andriessen in 1983

Rosa, A Horse Drama also called Rosa – The Death of a Composer is an opera in 12 scenes by Dutch composer, Louis Andriessen with a libretto by English film maker Peter Greenaway. The libretto was the sixth in Greenaway's Death of a Composer series which explores the deaths of ten 20th-century composers, two real (Anton Webern and John Lennon), and the remaining eight fictional. It premiered at the Dutch National Opera on 2 November 1994 in a production co-directed by Greenaway and Saskia Boddeke. A recording of the opera was released on the Nonesuch label in 1998; Asko/Schönberg, conductor Reinbert de Leeuw.

== Background ==
Andriessen had worked previously with Greenaway in 1991 on a BBC commission "M is for Man, Music, Mozart". They had discussed the idea of collaborating on a film or opera with Greenaway initially suggesting The Baby of Mâcon which Andriessen rejected. "Rosa" was finally decided upon with Andriessen noting "..it's not about Rosa, but about film, especially westerns, and about parody." The music in Scene 11 contains a homage to film composer, Ennio Morricone.

== Roles ==
Roles, voice types and premiere cast
Role	Voice type	Premiere cast, 2 November 1994 (Conductor: Reinbert de Leeuw)
Juan Manual de Rosa	Baritone	Lyndon Terracini
First singer, later Madame de Vries, later The Texan Whore, later The Investigatrix	Soprano	Miranda van Kralingen
Second singer, later The Blond Woman, later Esmeralda	Soprano	Marie Angel
Alcan, (one of The Gigolos), later one of The Cowboys	Tenor	Christopher Gillett
Lully, (one of The Gigolos), later one of The Cowboys	Baritone	Roger Smeets
The Index Singer	Spoken word	Phyllis Blanford

== Synopsis ==
The opera tells the story of Juan Manuel de Rosa, a fictitious Argentine composer who writes film scores for Westerns, and is murdered in Uruguay. The action is set in a disused abattoir in Fray Bentos, Uruguay. Rosa falls in love with his horse while mistreating his fiancée, Esmeralda Boscano, who is constantly writing to her mother about these events. In scene 4 she sings "Dear Mama I am jealous of a horse, is that possible?" In a desperate move to attract Rosa's attention she strips naked and covers herself in black ink in an effort to look like Rosa's horse, a black mare. Meanwhile two horsemen, possibly Esmeralda's brothers, advance on Rosa while he is out riding and shoot him dead. All of the action is staged as a 're-enactment' with the singers playing the part of actors, with frequent changing of roles. Two cowboys read the newspaper reports of the murder which refer to Esmeralda as Rosa's 'wife'. They then perform a marriage of Esmeralda to Rosa's corpse. It transpires that Rosa left a will with one sentence "When I die kill my horse and burn it." The opera concludes with Rosa's naked corpse sat astride his dead horse which has been eviscerated and now has Esmeralda and all of Rosa's money inside it. Everything is then burnt.

The opera is scored for 2 sopranos, tenor, 2 baritones, female speaker, 8 mixed voices, and extended orchestra including four saxophones, mouth organ, piano, synthesiser, bass guitar, two electric guitars and drums. The composer also makes a cameo appearance on Hammond organ.

== Production ==
Christopher Gillett recalled that Peter Greenaway wanted him and Roger Smeets to have real sex with Marie Angel in the horse scene, to that extent the mare was anatomically correct, with a cavity through which the two tenors could penetrate the soprano who was inside. But Marie Angel objected, saying: "Well, no-one is sticking anything in!".

== Reception ==
The work was well received. The Gramophone's Rob Cowan noting the opera's "lack of compromise, its snorting aggression" The Sunday Times wrote that Andriessen had "..developed an idiom in which minimalism, a distinct sort of rhythmic Stravinsky-ism and mainstream modernism are blended with masterful, totally personal ease.."

== Film Release ==
Greenaway made a film version in 1999, though it was not shown in the United States until a 2004 premiere at the Walter Reade Theater in New York City.
