= Saskia Boddeke =

Dutch director and artist

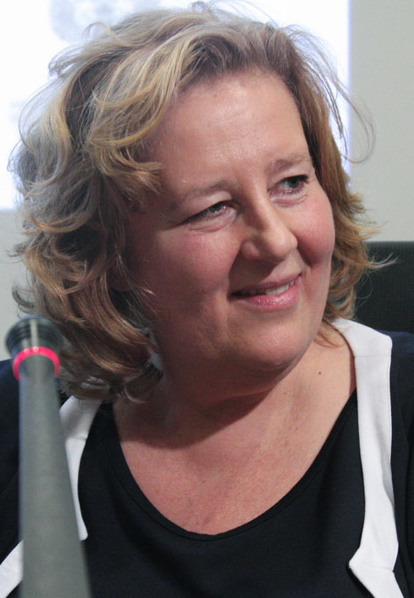
Saskia Boddeke in 2014

Saskia Boddeke (born 1962) is a Dutch multimedia artist and stage, opera and film-director. Her work incorporates multiple projections, computer programming, virtual environments such as Second Life, and inter-connecting animated audio-visual avatars with live actors. Her performances have been shown around the world. Boddeke also creates immersive multimedia installations where the visitors are surrounded by projections, sounds, light, smells and art objects. In 2015 Saskia was awarded the Russian TANR award for her exhibition in Moscow: "The Black Square, The Golden Age of the Russian Avantgarde", a multimedia installation.

== Opera and music theatre performances ==
Boddeke started to work as stage director and founded her own company Vals Akkoord and directed several productions. Boddeke also worked at the Dutch National Opera. In 1994 Boddeke directed the Opera 'Rosa, a horse drama. The libretto was written by Peter Greenaway. Boddeke and Greenaway worked very successfully together on several projects, Boddeke being responsible for the concept and direction based on Greenaway's libretto.

- 1994 & 1996: ‘Rosa, a horse drama, music by Louis Andriessen, libretto by Peter Greenaway, directed by Saskia Boddeke (Dutch National Opera) Amsterdam. A feature film is made of this production.
- 1997 & 1998: ‘Christoph Colomb’, music by Darius Milhaud, Deutsche Staatsoper Berlin.
- 1997-1999: ‘100 Objects to Represent the World ’, music by Jean-Baptiste Barrière, libretto by Peter Greenaway, premiered at the Salzburger Zeitfluss Festival, the show toured around Europe and South America.
- 2000: ‘Writing To Vermeer’, music by Louis Andriessen, libretto by Peter Greenaway, premiered at the DNO in Amsterdam, travelled to New York Lincoln Festival and Adelaide Festival in Australia.
- 2000: ‘La Gazzetta’ music by Rossini at the Summerborn Festival Zwolle
- 2001: ‘Gold, 92 Bars in a Crashed Car’, music by Borut Krisnik, libretto by Peter Greenaway, at Schauspiel Frankfurt.
- 2003: ‘Die Zauberflöte’, Mozart’, in co-direction with Pierre Audi (Salzburger Festspiele) Salzburg.
- 2005: ‘The Falls’ an installation-music theatre with the students of AERTEZ, music inspired by David Lang, from the collection of short biographies from The Falls by Peter Greenaway at the Broerenkerk Zwolle
- 2005: ‘Democracy’ an installation. Athens.
- 2008 - 2012: ‘The Blue Planet’ music by Goran Bregovic, libretto Peter Greenaway and Saskia Boddeke. Direction by Saskia Boddeke, the production was originally created as the closure performance of the expo in Spain at Zaragoza. The production travelled around Europe and China.
- 2008-2009: ‘Rembrandt’s Spiegel’, a multimedia music performance, music by Vincent van Warmerdam and libretto by Peter Greenaway (Productiehuis Rotterdam) tour through the Netherlands and to Budapest.
- 2010: ‘The Big Bang’, the inauguration show of the Copernicus Museum of Science in Warsaw, consisting of a projection-show on the exterior of the museum with life performance of music and dance including group participation of 250 Warsaw inhabitants.

== Multimedia productions ==
Boddeke and Greenaway worked together on different multimedia productions in buildings, like Castle Amerongen or musea, for example Obedience in the Jewish Museum Berlin.

- Wash and Travel, Eglise Sainte-Marie Madeleine Lille (2004)
- Democracy, Athene (2005)
- The Children of Uranium, Museum of Modern Art Genua (2005)
- A Day in the Life of a Castle, Castle Amerongen (2011)
- The Wife of a Diplomat, Castle Amerongen (2014)
- The Black Square, The Golden Age of Russian Avant-Garde (2014)
- Sex and the Sea, Maritiem Museum Stockholm (2014, 2015)
- Obedience/Gehorsam, Jewish Museum Berlin (2015)

== Films ==
- 1996: ‘Rosa, a Horse drama’, direction Saskia Boddeke and Peter Greenaway, music by Louis Andriessen.
- 2017: ‘The Greenaway Alphabet’ directed by Saskia Boddeke, documentary, 86 min. Premiere IDFA 2017

== Animation ==
Boddeke alias Rose Borchovski is also a well-known artist at Second Life where she created multiple installations. The Second Life installations can be visited online at The Second Life Grid and at the Aire Mille Flux art-grid. These installations were shown in the Madrid Pavilion at the Shanghai Expo of 2012 and in The Digital Art Exhibition in Spain of 2014. The installation The Inevitability of Fate received more than 200.000 visitors.

- 2013: ‘Dance of Death’ A Susa Bubble animation for a multimedia installation by Peter Greenaway at Basle.
- 2008 -2015: With her Second Life avatar, Rose Borchovski, Boddeke has created: The Susa Bubble story.

== VJ show ==
- 2007: ‘The Survivor of Warsaw’ by Arnold Schönberg, with Zubin Mehta and Charlotte Rampling at the Florence Opera House. A triple screen live projection show featuring the survivors of the Warsaw Ghetto.

== Personal life ==
In 2001 Boddeke married the British filmmaker Peter Greenaway. They live in Amsterdam and have a daughter named Zoë (often referred to as Pip) (born c. 2001), who featured in the documentary The Greenaway Alphabet. Greenaway also has another child who was born c. 2004.
