= Monica Germino =

American Dutch musician

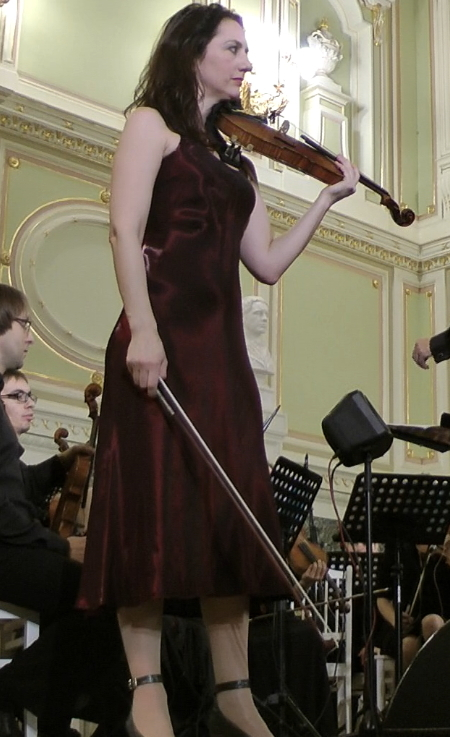
- Germino playing with the Moscow Modern Music Ensemble in 2013
- Known for: violinist
- Spouse: Louis Andriessen (m. 2012; died 2021)
- Website: www.monicagermino.com

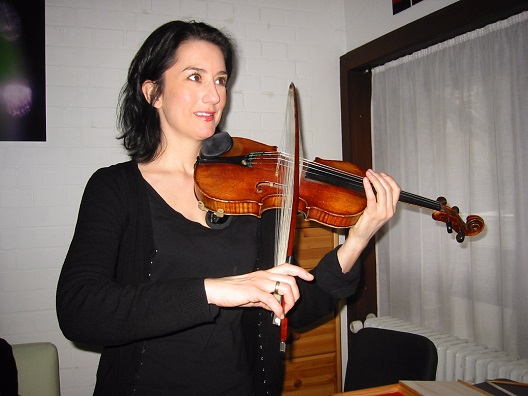
Monica Germino playing with the BACH.Bow

Monica Germino (born 1974) is an American and Dutch violinist.

Germino spent her early years in Virginia, US. She is a graduate of Yale and the New England Conservatory. In 1993 she received a grant to study music in The Netherlands. Germino resides in The Netherlands.

Monica Germino has performed at the Huddersfield Contemporary Music Festival (UK), Bang on a Can Marathon (NY), University of South Florida (USF), at New York's Austrian Cultural Forum and the Walt Disney Concert Hall.

Germino collaborates with "electronic sound designer" Frank van der Weij. Germino and Van der Weij have commissioned new works for violinist and sound designer from Julia Wolfe, Donnacha Dennehy, David Dramm, Arnoud Noordegraaf, Heiner Goebbels, Catherine Kontz, and Nick Williams.

Germino commissioned a Violectra (electric violin) in 2003. Among the pieces written for her on this instrument include composer Robert Zuidam's new Requiem (2013), Renske Vrolijk's 'Violectra Concerto' (2012), and David Dramm's 'Fuzzbox Logic' (2010). She also performs with her group ELECTRA and the band Electric Barbarian.

Germino frequently collaborates with the Dutch composer Louis Andriessen and the singer Cristina Zavalloni. In 2011, Andriessen composed a violin concerto for her, titled 'La Girò'. In 2002, Andriessen composed 'La Passione', a double concerto for Zavalloni and Germino. In 2009, the Boston Modern Orchestra Project brought out a CD of Andriessen's work, titled 'La Passione'. The title work and 'Passeggiata in Tram in America e Ritorno' are both settings of Dino Campana's poetry. Both works were composed for Zavalloni and Germino. Her performance of John Cage's Six Melodies played an inspirational role in Andriessen's opera "Writing to Vermeer."

Germino plays a Joannes Baptista Ceruti violin on permanent loan from the Elise Mathilde Foundation. Germino also sings and plays simultaneously and she plays with the curved bow.

She was married to composer Louis Andriessen from 2012 until his death in 2021.
