= Hoketus =

Musical ensemble

Hoketus was an amplified musical ensemble founded by Dutch composer Louis Andriessen in the Netherlands in 1976. The group was originally formed to perform Louis Andriessen's minimal composition Hoketus, but remained together and began to perform music composed for the group by other composers (many of whom came from within the group's ranks). The group disbanded in 1987.

The ensemble's instrumentation and overall artistic aesthetic was quite radical; it was made up of two equal groups of instruments (two pianos, two Fender Rhodes electric pianos, two sets of panpipes, two saxophones, two electric bass guitars, and two percussionists).

Hoketus considered itself a collective and set a number of rules for itself, rules so stringent that taken together they could be considered a manifesto. The group always performed with amplification set at a high volume, the two groups of instruments situating themselves as far apart as possible from one another on stage. Personal expression was not permitted; melodies could only be built through the interlocking of single notes or chords, played in alternation between the groups using the Medieval technique of hocket (hence the group's name). The group had an aesthetic bias toward works that were heavy, loud, dissonant, and brutal, showing influence from both hard rock and the works of Igor Stravinsky (one of Andriessen's favorite composers).

Besides Andriessen, other composers who wrote for Hoketus include Diderik Wagenaar, Cornelis de Bondt, Michael Nyman, Huib Emmer, Cees van Zeeland, Klas Torstensson, and Gene Carl.

An ensemble of similar instrumentation called Icebreaker was formed in York, England in 1989, and continues to perform works from the Hoketus repertoire.
