= Susan Narucki =

American operatic soprano

Susan Narucki (born March 9, 1957) is an American operatic soprano who specializes in performances of contemporary classical music.

== Career ==
She has appeared in the world premieres of several operas at the Dutch National Opera including Louis Andriessen and Peter Greenaway's Writing to Vermeer and Claude Vivier's Reves d'un Marco Polo as well as in Elliott Carter's What Next?

== Selected awards ==
- Best Classical Contemporary Composition Grammy Award for the recording of George Crumb's Star-Child (2000).
- Best Classical Vocal Performance Grammy Nomination (2002) for the recording of Elliott Carter's Tempo e Tempi.
- UCSD Chancellor's Associates Faculty Excellence Award (2014)
- Best Classical Solo Vocal Album Nomination for “The Edge of Silence — Works For Voice By György Kurtág” (2020).
