= Peter Schat =

Dutch composer (1935–2003)

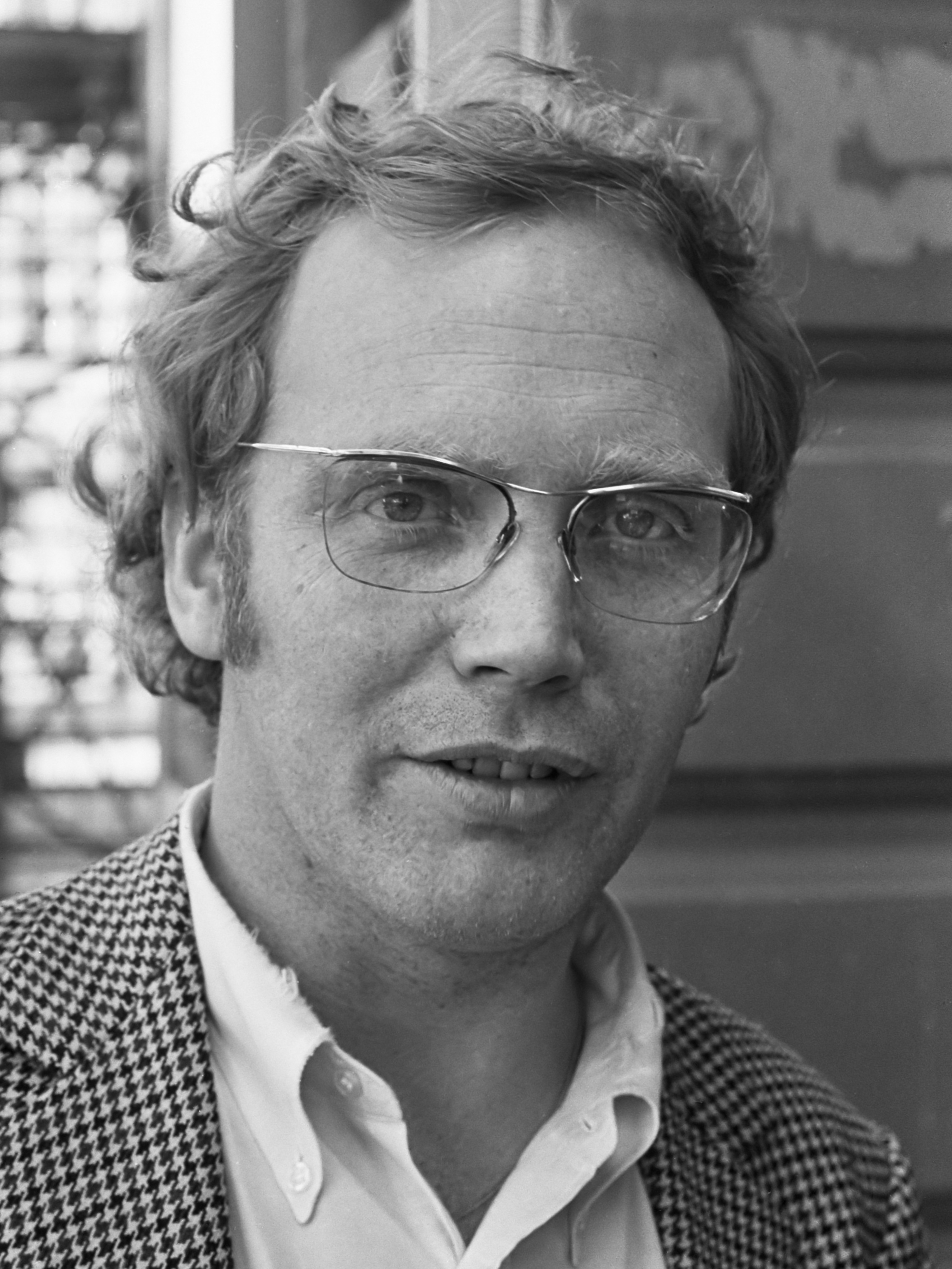
Peter Schat in 1968

Peter Ane Schat (5 June 1935 – 3 February 2003) was a Dutch composer.

== Biography ==
Schat was born on 5 June 1935 in Utrecht. He studied composition with Kees van Baaren (1952–1958) at the Utrecht Conservatoire and Royal Conservatory of The Hague. Then he studied with Mátyás Seiber (1959 London) and with Pierre Boulez (1960–1961 Basel). His 1954 Passacaglia and Fugue for organ was a notable early student work. Under van Baaren and Seiber, he combined traditional forms with dodecaphony in his 1954 Introductie en adagio in oude stijl and 1957 Septet. He won the 1957 Gaudeamus International Composers Award. Boulez led him to a more radical, strict form of serialism. Schat was regarded as one of the outstanding representatives of the avant garde in the Netherlands.

In the late sixties Schat became associated with the Provo movement; their publications were printed in his cellar. He was involved in the notorious 1969 "notenkrakersactie" (Nutcracker Action) in which a group of activists interrupted a concert by the Concertgebouw Orchestra, demanding an open discussion of music policy. That same year, Schat contributed, together with the composers Reinbert de Leeuw, Louis Andriessen, Jan van Vlijmen, and Misha Mengelberg, and the writers Harry Mulisch and Hugo Claus, to Reconstructie, a sort of opera, or "morality" theatre work, about the conflict between American imperialism and liberation.

In February 1969 he co-founded the Studio for Electro-Instrumental Music (STEIM) in Amsterdam. Among his most widely noted works are Thema (from 1970) and To You (from 1972). To You was performed at the Holland Festival.

The 1970s also brought Schat's most distinctive contribution to 20th-century music theory, the "tone clock". It lends its name to a translation of his collected essays, The Tone Clock (Contemporary Music Studies) (1993, Taylor and Francis Verlag, ISBN 978-3-7186-5369-0).

Schat died in Amsterdam on 3 February 2003, from cancer.

== Composition ==
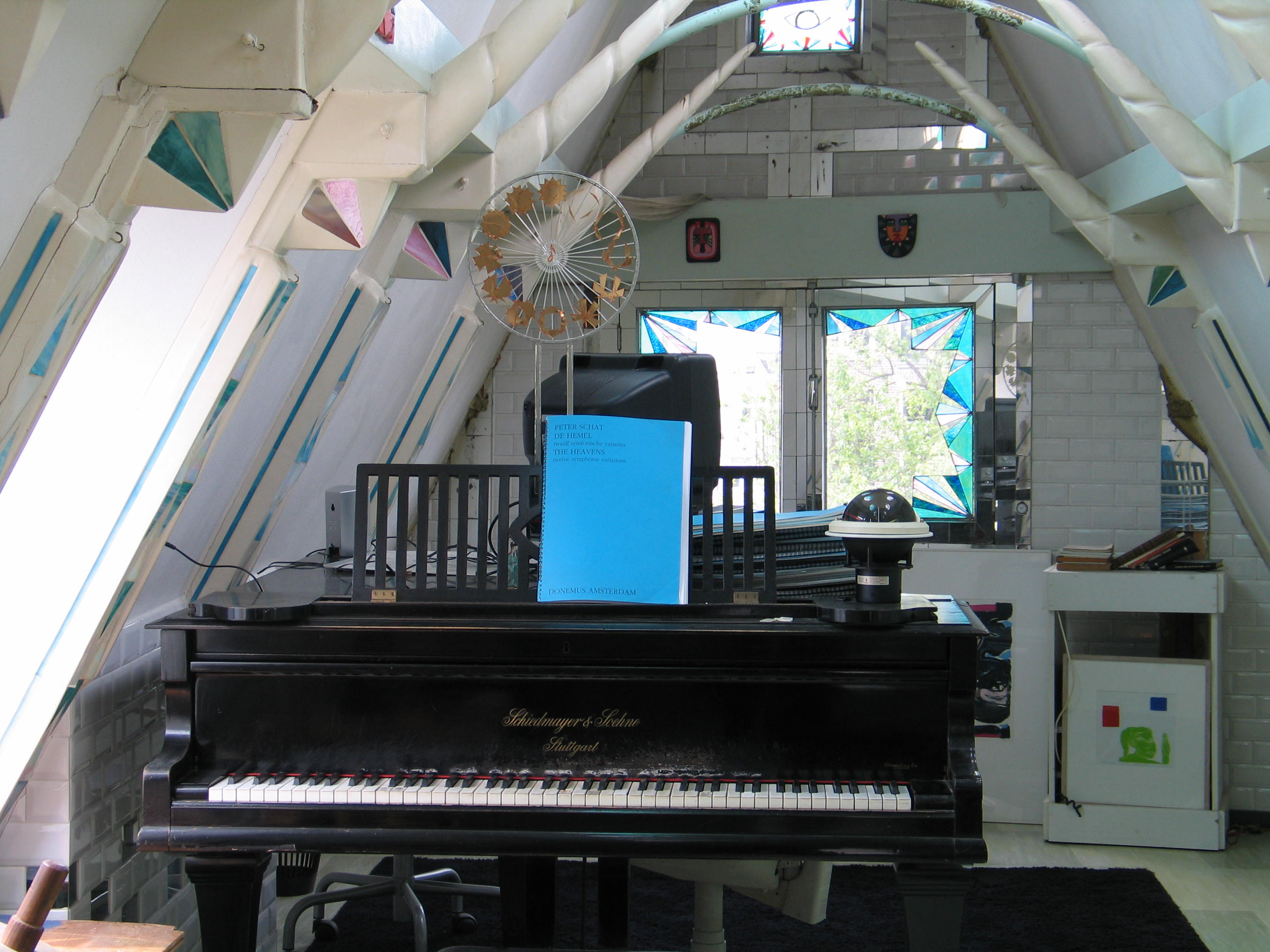
Peter Schat's studio under the roof on Oudezijds Voorburgwal 119

Symphonies

- Symphony No. 1 (1978, rev 1979)
- Symphony No. 2 (1983, rev. 1984)
- Symphony No. 3 (1998-2003)

Chamber music

- Octet (1958)
- Improvisations and symphonies (1960)
- Signalement (1961)
- First Essay on Electrocution (1966)
- Hypothema (1969)

Choir music

- The Fall (1960)
- The Fifth Season (1973)
- Breath (1984)
- An Indian Requiem (1995)

Opera and music theater

- Labyrint (1966)
- Reconstructie (1969)
- Houdini (1977)
- Aap verslaat de knekelgeest (1980)
- Symposion (1989)

Piano music

- Variations (1956)
- Inscriptions (1959)
- Anathema (1969)
- Polonaise (1981)

Other

- Passacaglia and Fugue for organ (1954)
- Clockwise and Anti-Clockwise for 16 wind instruments (1967)
- Thema (1970)
- To you (1972)
- Canto General
- Kind en Kraai
- De Hemel (1990)

== Sources ==
- Adlington, Robert. 2013. Composing Dissent: Avant-garde Music in 1960s Amsterdam. Oxford and New York: Oxford University Press. ISBN 978-0-19-998101-4.
- Beer, Roland de. 1994. "Tegen de toplaag, tegen de kunstpausen Het stille, cruciale effect van de Notenkrakeractie". De Volkskrant (11 November).
- Dufallo, Richard. 1989. Trackings: Composers Speak with Richard Dufallo. New York: Oxford University Press. ISBN 0-19-505816-X.
- Groot, Rokus de. 2001. "Schat, Peter". The New Grove Dictionary of Music and Musicians, second edition, edited by Stanley Sadie and John Tyrrell. London: Macmillan Publishers.
- Leeuw, Ton de. 1960. "New Trends in Modern Dutch Music". Sonorum Speculum, no. 4:131–33.
- Waa, Frits van der. 2003. "Wereldbestormer". De Volkskrant (4 February): 9.
