= Cristina Zavalloni =

Italian singer and composer

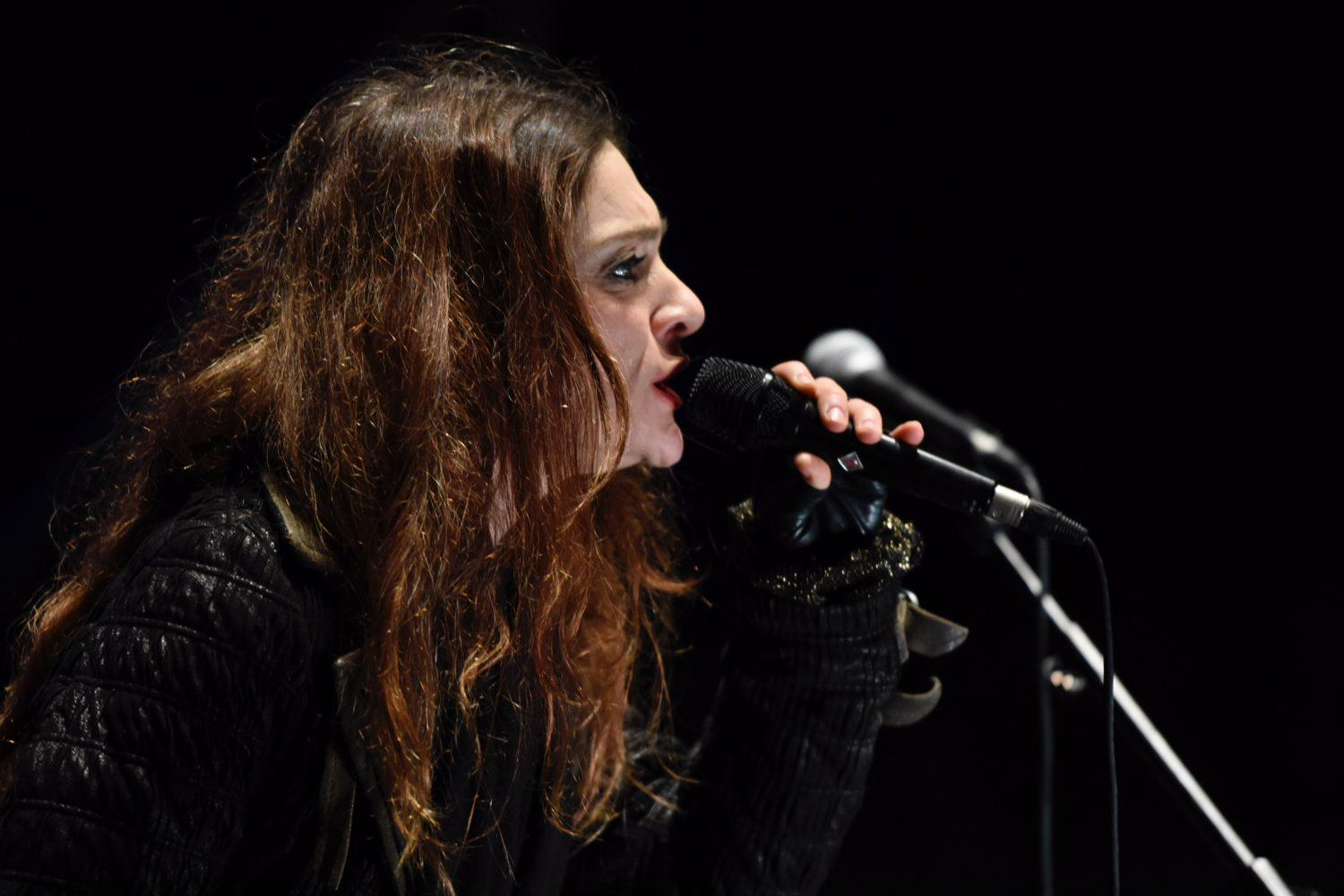
Cristina Zavalloni

Cristina Zavalloni (born 1973 in Bologna, Italy) is a contemporary Italian singer and composer who focuses primarily on jazz and experimental (or avant-garde) music.

== Biography and career ==
Born in Bologna, Zavalloni attended the Conservatorio di Musica "Giovan Battista Martini" and also studied classical and modern dance for several years.

Zavalloni frequently collaborates with the Dutch composer Louis Andriessen. In 2002, Andriessen composed a piece, La Passione, specifically for her and violinist Monica Germino. That song is based on the Canti Orfici by the poet Dino Campana.

In 1993, Zavalloni began a collaboration with Louis Andriessen, who wrote several works for her: Passeggiata in tram in America e ritorno; La Passione; Inanna; Letter from Cathy; and Racconto dall’ inferno, the recording of which resulted in her having been awarded a Diapason d’Or in 2008. Andriessen also composed the role of Dante in La Commedia and the role of Anaïs Nin in his new opera Anaïs—premiered in July 2010—for her.
