= Marcel Beekman =

Dutch operatic tenor

Marcel Beekman (born 3 September 1969) is a Dutch operatic tenor currently based in Amsterdam, the Netherlands. Born in Zwolle, Beekman sang as a boy soprano and studied singing with Frauke Vonk. His first recording appeared in 1979. In 1993 he completed his vocal studies at the Conservatory in Zwolle with Felix Schoonenboom and continued his education with Margreet Honig in Amsterdam. Marcel Beekman is specialized in baroque opera (Rameau's Platée and Les Indes galantes, Monteverdi, Purcell...). However, he is also famous for his contribution in 18th repertory (Mozart) and 19th (Benvenuto Cellini, Eugen Oneguin,Siegfried...). He also contributed to contemporary creations.

== Awards ==
- 2025 Thalia Award Opera
