= Orkest de Volharding =

Dutch music ensemble

Orkest de Volharding (perseverance orchestra) is a Dutch music ensemble, founded in 1972 by Louis Andriessen and saxophonist Willem Breuker, named after the eponymous Andriessen work. The line up for the original concert, on 12 May 1972, was three each of trumpets, saxes and trombones, plus Andriessen on the piano. After that the standard line was established with the addition of flute, horn and bass (although for a period 2 clarinets were added as well).

Originally conceived as a street band with a political agenda, the group has gradually evolved into a more conventional contemporary music ensemble, adding a conductor in the 1990s. Andriessen wrote a number of works for the group before leaving in the late 1970s. None of musicians who played in the very first concert are still with the group, but flautist Dil Engelhard and saxophonist Bob Driessen, who joined immediately afterwards, are still members.
