= Louis Andriessen =

Dutch composer and pianist (1939–2021)

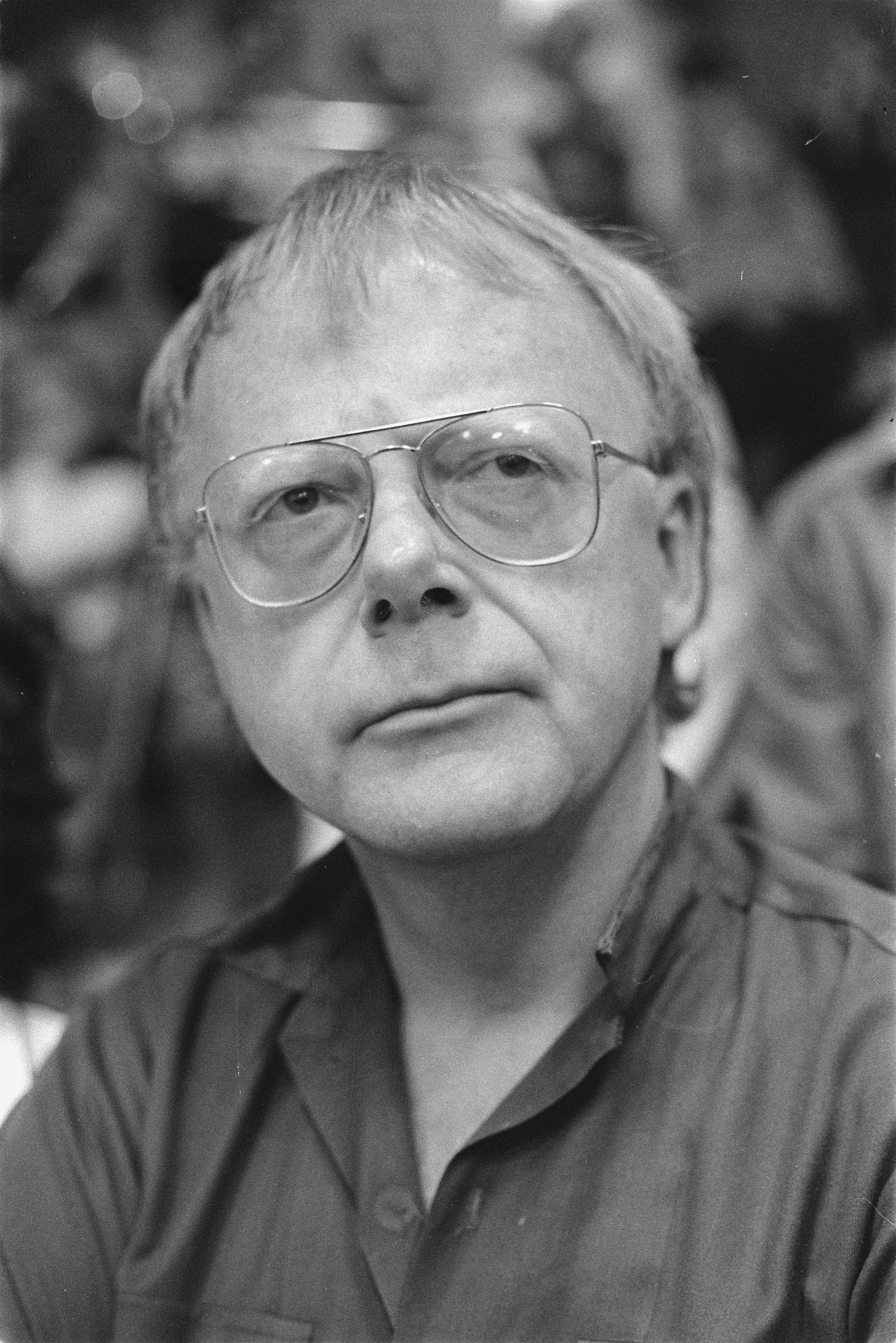
- Andriessen in 1983
- Born: 6 June 1939; Utrecht, Netherlands
- Died: 1 July 2021 (aged 82); Weesp, Netherlands
- Education: Royal Conservatory of The Hague
- Occupations: Composer; Pianist; Academic teacher
- Organizations: STEIM; Royal Conservatory of The Hague; University of Leiden
- Spouses: Jeanette Yanikian (m. 1996; died 2008) Monica Germino (m. 2012)
- Awards: Gaudeamus International Composers Award; UNESCO International Rostrum of Composers in Paris; Matthijs Vermeulen Award; Edison Award; Grawemeyer Award

Louis Joseph Andriessen (Dutch: [luˈʋi ˈɑndrisə(n)]; 6 June 1939 – 1 July 2021) was a Dutch composer, pianist and academic teacher. Considered the most influential Dutch composer of his generation, he was a central proponent of The Hague school of composition. Although his music was initially dominated by neoclassicism and serialism, his style gradually shifted to a synthesis of American minimalism, big band jazz and the expressionism of Igor Stravinsky.

Born in Utrecht into a musical family, Andriessen studied composition under his father Hendrik Andriessen as well as Kees van Baaren and Luciano Berio. Andriessen taught at the Royal Conservatory of The Hague from 1974 to 2012, influencing notable composers. His opera La Commedia, based on Dante's Divine Comedy, won the 2011 Grawemeyer Award for Music Composition and was selected in 2019 by critics at The Guardian as one of the most outstanding compositions of the 21st century.

== Life and career ==
Andriessen was born in Utrecht on 6 June 1939 to a musical family, the son of the composer Hendrik Andriessen and Johanna Justina Anschütz (1898–1975). His father was professor of composition at the Royal Conservatory of The Hague, and later its director. His siblings were composers Jurriaan Andriessen (1925–1996) and Caecilia Andriessen (1931–2019), and he is the nephew of Willem Andriessen (1887–1964).

Andriessen originally studied with his father and Kees van Baaren at the Royal Conservatory of The Hague, graduating in 1961 with a first prize, before embarking upon two years of study under Luciano Berio in Milan and Berlin. His father introduced him to the works of Francis Poulenc and Erik Satie, which he came to love. From 1961–65, Andriessen wrote for the daily De Volkskrant, and for De Gids magazine from 1966–69. Andriessen lived in Amsterdam starting in 1965.

In 1969, Andriessen was part of a group of protesters at a concert of the Royal Concertgebouw Orchestra. They disrupted the concert with nutcrackers and bicycle horns, handing out leaflets on the dismal representation of Dutch new music in the orchestra's programming. The next year, he and the other "Nutcrackers" were given one-week prison sentences, but their protest sparked social reform in the Dutch music scene.

Andriessen became internationally recognised as a composer with his 1976 work De Staat, which included texts from Plato's Republic. He was one of the founders of the Hague School, an avant-garde and minimalist movement from the second half of the 20th century. In later decades, he accepted commissions from major orchestras including the San Francisco Symphony, the Los Angeles Philharmonic, the BBC Symphony Orchestra and the New York Philharmonic. Andriessen was the focus of festivals in Tanglewood (1994), London (1994; 2002), Tokyo (2000), Brisbane (2001) and New York (2004). In 2008, he was elected an honorary member of the International Society for Contemporary Music. He held the Richard and Barbara Debs Composer's Chair at Carnegie Hall during the 2009–10 season.

=== Ensembles ===
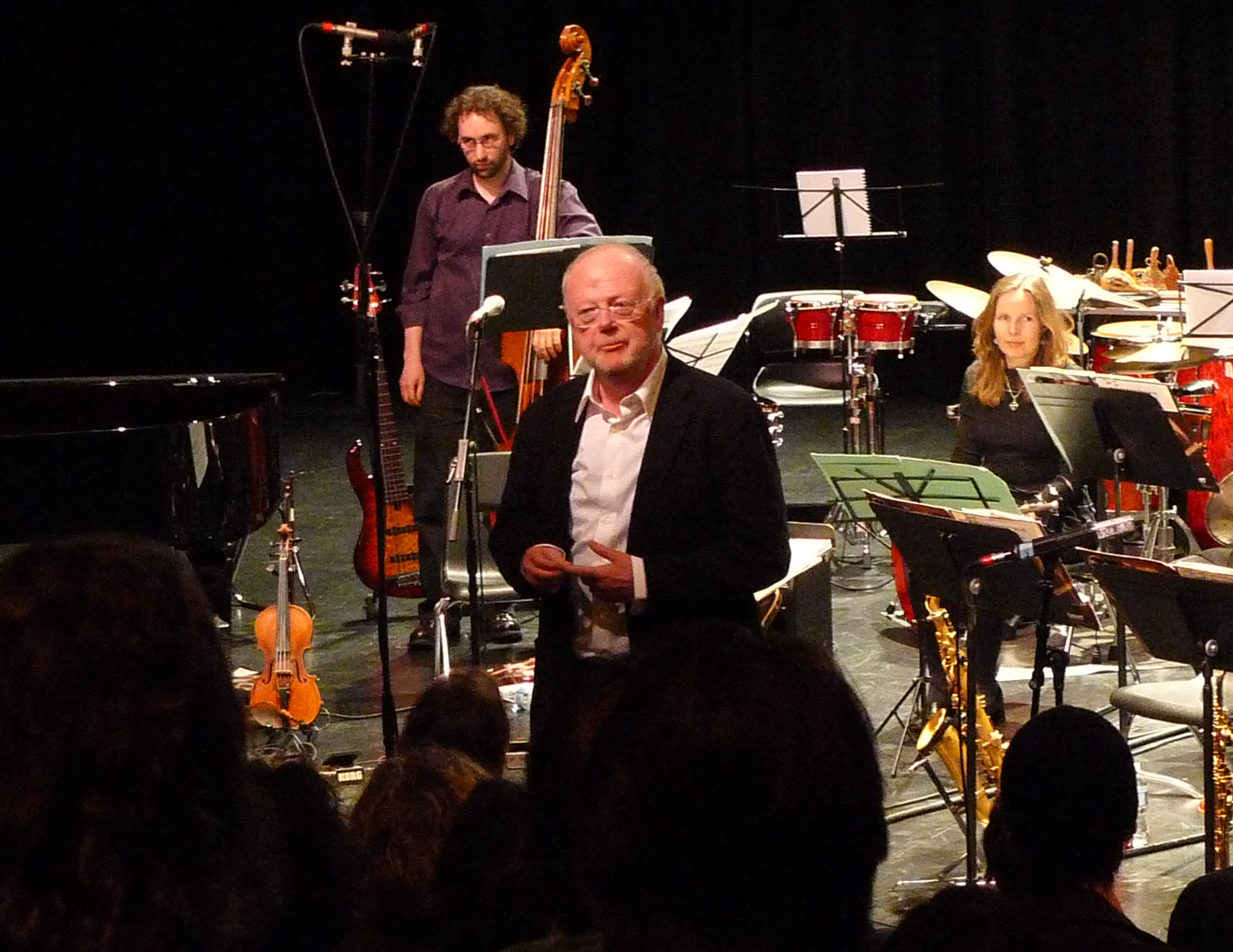
Andriessen at the Roundhouse in Vancouver (2009)

In 1969, Andriessen co-founded the Studio voor Elektro-Instrumentale Muziek (STEIM) in Amsterdam. In opposition to the classical orchestra, a structure seen as "hierarchical", he also helped found the instrumental groups Orkest de Volharding and Hoketus, both of which performed compositions of the same names, formed by classical, jazz and pop musicians. He later became closely involved with the Schonberg and Asko ensembles and inspired the formation of the British ensemble Icebreaker.

=== Teaching ===
Andriessen joined the faculty of the Royal Conservatory in 1974. He taught instrumentation from 1974 to 1978 and taught composition there from 1978 to 2012, where he influenced notable students including Michel van der Aa, Richard Ayres and Steve Martland. Yale University invited him in 1987 to lecture on theory and composition, and he was also a guest lecturer at the University at Buffalo (1989) and Princeton University (1996). The arts faculty of the University of Leiden appointed him professor in 2004. One of his students was Raminta Šerkšnytė, a Lithuanian pianist and composer.

=== Personal life ===
Andriessen was married to guitarist Jeanette Yanikian (1935–2008). They were a couple for over 40 years, and were married in 1996. La Commedia is dedicated to Yanikian. He was married in 2012 a second time to violinist Monica Germino, for whom he wrote several works. In December 2020, she announced that Andriessen was suffering from dementia. He died on 1 July 2021 in Weesp at age 82.

Andriessen had one son, Lodewijk Torenbos-Andriessen, with dancer and theatre director Betsy Torenbos.

== Style and notable works ==
Andriessen began in the style of an intentionally dry neoclassicism, but then turned into a strict serialist. His early works show experimentation with various contemporary trends: post-war serialism (Series, 1958), pastiche (Anachronie I, 1966–67), and tape (Il Duce, 1973). His reaction to what he perceived as the conservatism of much of the Dutch contemporary music scene quickly moved him to form a radically alternative musical aesthetic of his own. From the early 1970s on he refused to write for conventional symphony orchestras and instead opted to write for his own idiosyncratic instrumental combinations, which often retain some traditional orchestral instruments alongside electric guitars, electric basses, and congas. Andriessen repeatedly used his music for political confessions and messages, but he also referred to painting and philosophy. His range of inspiration was wide, including the music of Charles Ives in Anachronie I, the art of Piet Mondrian in De Stijl, the visions of Beguine mystic Hadewijch in Hadewijch, and shipbuilding and atomic theory in De Materie Part I.

Andriessen's later style is a unique blend of American sounds and European forms. His mature music combines the influences of jazz, American minimalism, and the music of Igor Stravinsky and Claude Vivier, containing minimalist-influenced polyrhythms, lyrical melodic fragments, and predominantly consonant harmonies disrupted by concentrated dissonance. Andriessen's music thus departs from post-war European serialism and its offshoots. By the 21st century he was widely regarded as Europe's most important minimalist composer.

His notable works include Workers Union (1975), a melodically indeterminate piece "for any loud sounding group of instruments" whose score specifies rhythm and contour but not exact pitch; Mausoleum (1979) for two baritones and large ensemble; De Tijd (Time, 1979–81) for female singers and ensemble; De Snelheid (Velocity, 1982–83), for three amplified ensembles; De Materie (Matter, 1984–88), a large four-part work for voices and ensemble; collaborations with filmmaker and librettist Peter Greenaway on the film M is for Man, Music, Mozart and the operas Rosa: A Horse Drama (1994) and Writing to Vermeer (1998); and La Passione (2000–02) for female voice, violin and ensemble. His 2008 opera La Commedia, based on Dante's Divine Comedy, won the 2011 Grawemeyer Award for Music Composition and was selected by critics at The Guardian as one of the most outstanding classical compositions of the 21st century in 2019.

== Awards and honours ==
- 1959 Gaudeamus International Composers Award
- 1977 Matthijs Vermeulen Award for De Staat
- 1977 UNESCO International Rostrum of Composers in Paris
- 1992 Matthijs Vermeulen Award for M. is for Man, Music and Mozart; Facing Death, Dances, Hout en Lacrimosa
- 1993 Edison Award
- 2010 Honorary doctorate from the Birmingham City University
- 2011 Grawemeyer Award for Music Composition for the multimedia opera La Commedia (2004–2008).
- 2016 Marie-Josée Kravis Prize for New Music
- 2019 Honorary doctorate from the University of Amsterdam

== Works ==
Andriessen's primary publishers are Boosey & Hawkes and Donemus.

Complete list of works:

- Rondo Barbaro (1954) for piano
- Sonata (1956) for flute and piano (dedicated to Lucas van Regteren Altena)
- Elegy (1957) for cello and piano
- Elegy (1957) for double bass and piano (arrangement by Quirijn van Regteren Altena)
- Nuit d'été (1957) for piano four hands
- Quartet in two movements (1957) for string quartet
- Séries (1958) for 2 pianos
- Nocturnen (1959) (text by the composer) for 2 sopranos, orchestra (dedicated to Jeanette Yanikian)
- Percosse (1959) for flute, trumpet, bassoon and percussion
- Prospettive e Retrospettive (1959) for piano
- Trois Pièces (1961) for piano left hand
- Aanloop en sprongen (1961) (Rincorsa e salti) for flute, oboe and clarinet in Bb
- Ittrospezione I (1961) for piano 4 hands
- Joli commentaire (1961) for piano 4 hands
- Paintings (1961) for one flutist (or recorder player) and one pianist
- Étude pour les timbres (1962) for piano
- Triplum (1962) for guitar (dedicated to Jeanette Yanikian)
- Canzone 3 (Utinam) (1962) for voice and piano
- Constructions for a Ballet (1962, revision 2009) for orchestra, including Ondine, timbres voor orkest
- Plein-chant (1963) for flute and harp (dedicated to Eugenie van des Grinten and Veronica Reyns)
- Ittrospezione II (1963) for large orchestra
- Sweet (1964) for alto (treble) recorder (dedicated to Frans Brüggen)
- Registers (1963) for piano
- A flower song II (1964) for oboe solo
- A flower song III (1964) for violoncello solo
- Ittrospezione III (Concept I) (1964) for 2 pianos and 3 instrumental groups
- Double (1965) for clarinet and piano (dedicated to George Pieterson and Tan Crone)
- Ittrospezione III (Concept II) – Fragment (1965) tenor saxophone ad libitum, 2 pianos (section of Ittrospezione III [Concept II]; may be performed separately)
- Beatles Songs (1966) (satirical arrangements of four Beatles songs) for female voice and piano
- Souvenirs d'enfance (1954–1966) for piano. Including amongst others: Nocturne, Ricercare, Allegro Marcato, As you like it, Blokken, Strawinsky, Rondo opus 1, Étude pour les timbres, dotted quarter note = 70
- Rage, rage against the dying of the light (1966) for 4 trombones
- Anachronie I (1966–67) for large orchestra
- The Garden of Ryoan-gi (1967) for 3 electronic organs
- Worum es ging und worum es geht (1967) (with Misha Mengelberg) for orchestra
- Contra tempus (1967–1968) for large ensemble
- Choralvorspiele (1969) for barrel organ
- Anachronie II (1969) for oboe, small orchestra (4 horns, harp, piano, strings)
- Hoe het is (1969) for 52 strings and live electronics
- Sonate op. 2 nr. 1 (1969) for piano with interruptions from string quartet (based on Piano Sonata No. 1 by Ludwig van Beethoven)
- Reconstructie (1969) (with Reinbert de Leeuw, Misha Mengelberg, Peter Schat, Jan van Vlijmen; libretto by Hugo Claus, Harry Mulisch) Morality opera for soloists, 3 mixed choruses (4 voices each), orchestra (11 winds, 7 brass, 2 guitars, 11 keyboards, 10 strings), live electronics
- De negen symfonieën van Beethoven (1970) for ice cream bell, orchestra
- Spektakel (1970) for improvisational ensemble (saxophone [+ bass clarinet], viola, bass guitar, electronic organ [+ piano], percussion [or other instruments]), small orchestra (12 winds, 4 horns, 6 percussion)
- Vergeet mij niet (1970) (Forget me not) for oboe
- Le voile du bonheur (1966–1971) for violin and piano
- een, twee (1971) for organ, 10 instrumentalists and piano
- In Memoriam (1971) for tape
- Volkslied (1971) for an unlimited number and kinds of instruments (in all octaves) (based on the Dutch national anthem Wilhelmus van Nassouwe and on The Internationale)
- De Volharding (1972) (Perseverance) for piano and wind instruments (written for Orkest de Volharding)
- Dat gebeurt in Vietnam (1972) (That's going on in Vietnam) for wind ensemble
- Arrangement of Solidaritätslied by Hanns Eisler (1972) for wind ensemble
- Arrangement of Streikslied by Hanns Eisler (1972) for wind ensemble
- Arrangement of In C by Terry Riley (1972) for wind ensemble
- Arrangement of Bereits sprach der Welt by Hanns Eisler (1972) for wind ensemble
- Arrangement of Tango by Igor Stravinsky (1972) for wind ensemble
- Arrangement of La création du monde by Darius Milhaud (1972) for wind ensemble
- Thanh Hoa (1972) (text by Nguyen Thai Mao) for voice and piano
- Canzone 3: Utinam (1972) (text from the Book of Job) for soprano, piano, 1962; Thanh Hoa (text by Nguyen Thay Mao), voice, piano
- On Jimmy Yancey (1973) for 9 winds, piano and double bass (written for Orkest de Volharding)
- Voor Sater (1973) for wind ensemble
- Amsterdam Vrij (1973) for wind ensemble
- Il Duce (1973) for tape
- The family (1973) for ensemble (film music)
- Melodie (1972–1974) for alto recorder (or other flute) and piano
- Arrangement of Ipanema and Gavea from Saudades do Brasil by Darius Milhaud (1974) for wind ensemble
- Il Principe (1974) (text by Niccolò Machiavelli) for 2 mixed choruses, 8 winds, 3 horns, tuba, bass guitar, piano
- Wals (1974) for piano
- Symfonieën der Nederlanden (1974) for 2 or more symphonic bands (minimum 32 players)
- Nederland, let op uw schoonheyt (1975) for symphonic band
- Workers Union (1975) for any loud-sounding group of instruments
- De Staat (1972–76) (text by Plato) for 2 sopranos, 2 mezzo-sopranos, 4 oboes (3rd, 4th + English horn), 4 horns, 4 trumpets, 3 trombones, bass trombone, 2 harps, 2 electric guitars, 4 violas, bass guitar, 2 pianos (also transcribed for two pianos in 1992 by Cees van Zeeland and Gerard Bouwhuis)
- Mattheus passie (1976) (text by Louis Ferron) Music theatre work for 8 mixed voices, 2 oboes (both + English horn), Hammond organ, string quartet, double bass
- Hoketus (1975–76) for 2 panpipes, 2 alto saxophones ad libitum, 2 bass guitars, 2 pianos, 2 electric pianos, 2 congas
- Orpheus (1977) (text by Lodewijk de Boer) Music theatre work for 8 mixed voices, lyricon, electric guitar, bass guitar, synthesizer, percussion
- Symphonie voor losse snaren (1978) for 12 strings
- Laat toch vrij die straat (1978) (text by Jaap van der Merwe) for voice and piano
- Hymn to the Memory of Darius Milhaud (1978) (version of chamber work)
- Felicitatie (1979) for 3 trumpets
- Toespraak (1979) for speaker who also plays trombone
- Mausoleum (1979 rev. 1981) (texts by Mikhail Bakunin, Arthur Arnould) for 2 high baritones, orchestra (12 brass, 2 harps, cimbalom, 2 pianos, 2 percussion, minimum 10 strings, bass guitar)
- Music for the film The Alien (1980) (Rudolf van den Berg)
- George Sand (1980) (text by Mia Meyer) Music theatre work for 8 mixed voices, 4 pianos
- Un beau baiser (1980) for mixed chorus
- Messe des pauvres by Erik Satie, arrangement by Louis Andriessen for choir, 15 solo strings, accordion, contrabass clarinet and harp (1980)
- Ende (1981) for 2 alto recorders (1 player) (dedicated to Frans Brüggen)
- Anfang (1981) for sopranino recorder and piano
- De Tijd (1979–81) (text by St. Augustine of Hippo) for female chorus, percussion ensemble, orchestra (6 flutes, 2 alto flutes, 3 clarinets, contrabass clarinet, 6 trumpets, 2 harps, 2 pianos, Hammond organ, strings, 2 bass guitars)
- Commentaar (1981) (text by Wilhelm Schön) for voice and piano
- La voce (1981) (to a text by Cesare Pavese) for cello and voice
- Disco (1982) for violin and piano
- Overture to Orpheus (1982) for harpsichord
- De Snelheid (1982–83 rev. 1984) for 3 amplified ensembles
- Y después (1983) (text by Federico García Lorca) for voice and piano
- Menuet voor Marianne (1983) for piano
- Trepidus (1983) for piano
- Doctor Nero (1984) Music theatre work
- Berceuse voor Annie van Os (1985) for piano
- De Lijn (1986) for 3 flutes
- Dubbelspoor (1986 rev. 1994) Ballet music for piano, harpsichord, celesta, glockenspiel
- De Materie (1984–88) (texts from the Plakkaat van Verlatinge, Nicolaes Witsen, David Gorlaeus, Hadewijch, M.H.J. Schoenmaekers, Madame van Domselaer-Middelkoop, Willem Kloos, Marie Curie, Françoise Giroud). Music theatre work for soprano, tenor, 2 female speakers, 8 amplified mixed voices, amplified orchestra (15 winds, 13 brass, harp, 2 electric guitars, 2 pianos [one + electric piano], off-stage upright piano, celesta, 2 synthesizers, 6 percussion, minimum 9 strings, bass guitar. Two of its four sections may be performed separately as concert works: [2] Hadewijch, [3] De Stijl
- De Toren (1988, rev. 2000) for carillon
- Nietzsche redet (1989) (text by Friedrich Nietzsche) for speaker, alto flute, English horn, clarinet, bass clarinet, bassoon, 2 violins, viola, 2 celli, double bass, 2 pianos
- Flora Tristan (1990) for mixed choir a cappella (text by Fleur Bourgonje)
- Facing Death (1990) for amplified string quartet
- Facing Death (1990) for saxophone quartet (arrangement by Aurelia Saxophone Quartet)
- Dances (1991) (text by Joan Grant, choreography by Bianca van Dillen) For soprano, small orchestra (amplified harp, amplified piano, percussion, strings). May be performed as a concert work.
- M is for Man, Music, Mozart (1991) (texts by the composer, Jeroen van der Linden, Peter Greenaway) for female jazz voice, flute (+ piccolo), soprano saxophone, alto saxophone, tenor saxophone, horn, 3 trumpets, 2 trombones, bass trombone, double bass, piano (TV score; may be performed as a concert work with one additional song)
- Lacrimosa (1991) for 2 bassoons
- Lacrimosa (1991) for 2 flutes (arrangement by Manuel Zurria)
- Hout (1991) for tenor saxophone, electric guitar, piano and marimba (+ woodblocks)
- Romance voor Caecilia (1991) for piano
- Nadir en Zenit (1992) improvisations on poems by Sybren Polet for voice and piano (+ synthesizer)
- ...not being sundered (1992) (text by Rainer Maria Rilke) for soprano, flute, cello
- Song Lines (1992) for 3–6 saxophones
- Deuxième chorale (1992) for music box
- The Memory of Roses (1992) for piano (+ toy piano)
- Chorale (1992) for piano
- M is Muziek, Monoloog en Moord (1993) (text by Lodewijk de Boer) Music theatre work
- Lied (1993) for piano
- Rosa – A Horse Drama: The Death of a Composer (1993–94) (libretto by Peter Greenaway) Opera for 2 sopranos, tenor, 2 baritones, female speaker, 8 mixed voices, orchestra.
- Een lied van de zee (1994) (text by Hélène Swarth) for female voice
- Zilver (1994) for flute, clarinet, violin, cello, piano, vibraphone and marimba
- Base (1994) for piano left hand
- Odysseus' Women (1995) (text by Homer, choreography by Beppie Blankert) for 2 sopranos, 2 altos, sampler
- De komst van Willibrord (1995) for carillon
- To Pauline O (1995) for oboe
- Machmes Wos (1996) for voice, piano
- Trilogie van de Laatste Dag (1996–97) (each of its three sections may be performed separately: (i) The Last Day (texts by Lucebert, folksong A Woman and Her Lass) for boy soprano, 4 male voices, orchestra; (ii) TAO (texts by Laozi, Kotaro Takamura) for 4 female voices, piano [+ voice, koto], small orchestra [5 winds, 2 horns, harp, piano (+ celesta), 2 percussion, minimum 14 strings]; (iii) Dancing on the Bones (text by the composer) for children's chorus, orchestra, 1997)
- De herauten (1997) for 3 horns, 3 trumpets, 3 trombones, tuba, timpani
- Not an Anfang (1997) for piano
- De eerste minnaar (1998) (text by Toon Tellegen) for boy soprano, organ, 1998 (section of music theatre work Oldenbarneveldt; may be performed as a concert work)
- Tuin van Zink (1998) for viola and live electronics
- Writing to Vermeer (1997–99) (libretto by Peter Greenaway) Opera for 2 children's voices, 2 sopranos, mezzo-soprano, female chorus, orchestra (7 winds, 2 horns, 2 trumpets [2nd + bass trumpet], 2 harps, 2 electric guitars, cimbalom, 2 pianos, on-stage harpsichord, 2 percussion, minimum 22 strings), CD (music by Michel van der Aa)
- Woodpecker (1999) for percussion
- Image de Moreau (1999) for piano
- Dirck Sweelinck Missed the Prince (1999) for harpsichord
- Passeggiata in tram in America e ritorno (1999) (text by Dino Campana) for female Italian voice, violin and piano
- What Shall I Buy You, Son? (2000) for voice, piano
- Boodschappenlijstje van een gifmengster (2000) (text by the composer) for vocalist (also writes), voice (may be performed as Shopping List of a Poisoner [translated by Nicoline Gatehouse]
- Inanna's Descent (2000) for mezzo-soprano, piccolo, oboe, violin, piano, 2 percussion ensembles (4–12 total players)
- The New Math(s) (2000) (text by Hal Hartley) for soprano, transverse flute, violin, marimba, CD (music by Michel van der Aa), 2000 (film score; may be performed as a concert work)
- Feli-citazione (2000) for piano
- Passeggiata in tram in America e ritorno (2001) (text by Dino Campana) for female Italian voice, 3 trumpets, 3 trombones, electric guitar, electric violin, double bass, piano, percussion, 1998 (also version for voice, flute, horn, 3 trumpets, 3 trombones, amplified violin, double bass, piano
- De vleugels van de herinnering (2001) (text by Larissa Tiginachvili [Dutch translation]) for voice, piano
- Fanfare om te beginnen (2001) for 6 groups of horns
- La Passione (2000–02) (text by Dino Campana) for female jazz voice, violin, small orchestra (7 winds, 7 brass, electric guitar, cimbalom, 2 pianos, synthesizer, 2 percussion, 3 violins, bass guitar)
- Very Sharp Trumpet Sonata (2002) for trumpet
- Tuin van Eros (Garden of Eros) (2002) for string quartet
- Klokken voor Haarlem (Bells for Haarlem) (2002) for piano, celesta, synthesizer, vibraphone (+ glockenspiel)
- Pupazzetti by Alfredo Casella, arranged by Louis Andriessen for ensemble in 2002–2003
- Inanna (2003) texts by Hal Hartley, Theo J.H. Krispijn) for 4 voices, 3 actors, mixed chorus, contrabass clarinet, 4 saxophones, violin, film (by Hal Hartley)
- Letter from Cathy (2003) (text from a letter by Cathy Berberian to the composer) for female jazz voice, harp, violin, double bass, piano, percussion
- Tuin van Eros (2003) for violin and piano
- RUTTMANN Opus II, III, IV (2003) for flute, 3 saxophones, horn, 3 trumpets, 3 trombones, double bass, piano (film music for a film of Walter Ruttman, written for the Filmmuseum Biennale 2003)
- Haags Hakkûh (The Hague Hacking) (2003) for 2 pianos. Renamed to Haags Hakkûh Stukje (The Hague Hacking Scrap) in 2008.
- Racconto dall'inferno (2004) (text by Dante Alighieri) for female jazz voice, small orchestra (8 winds, 6 brass, guitar, cimbalom, 2 pianos, 2 percussion, minimum 8 strings, bass guitar). Part II of La Commedia (2004–08).
- De Opening (2005) for ensemble (combined Orkest de Volharding, ASKO Ensemble, Schoenberg Ensemble)
- Vermeer Pictures (2005) concert suite for orchestra from Writing to Vermeer (arrangement by Clark Rundell)
- XENIA (2005) for violin
- Hymn to the memory of Darius Milhaud for ensemble (1974/2006)
- Hellende Fanfare (Inclined fanfare; Fanfara inclinata) (2006) for voice and ensemble (Text by Dino Campana)
- Raadsels (Riddle) (2006) for solo violin
- Johann Sebastian Bach's Prelude in b minor from the Well-Tempered Clavier BWV 866, arranged for string quartet with the first six bars augmented with a viola part by Igor Stravinsky, completed by Louis Andriessen (2006)
- ..miserere... (2006–07) for string quartet
- The City of Dis or: The Ship of Fools (2007) for voices and ensemble. Part I of La Commedia (2004–08).
- La Commedia (2004–08). Film opera in five parts (texts by Dante and Vondel and from the Old Testament)
- Haags Hakkûh (The Hague Hacking) (2008) for two pianos and large ensemble
- Christiaan Andriessens uitzicht op de Amstel (Christiaan Andriessen's view on the river Amstel) (2009) for ensemble
- Life (2009) for ensemble, with film by Marijke van Warmerdam
- Anaïs Nin (2009/10) for singer, ensemble and film
- La Girò (2011), for violin solo and ensemble
- Mysteriën (2013), for orchestra
- Tapdance (2013), concerto for percussion and large ensemble
- Two way ticket (2014), for piano
- Theatre of the World (2013–15), a 'grotesque stagework' in nine scenes (Libretto by Helmut Krausser)
- Mach's mit mir, Gott (Do unto me, God) (2016), for organ
- Signs and Symbols (2016), for wind ensemble and percussion
- Ahania Weeping (2016), for mixed chorus
- De goddelijke routine (The divine routine) (2017), for organ
- Rimsky or La Monte Young (2017), for piano
- Agamemnon (2017), for speaker and large orchestra
- Searching for unison (étude) (2018), for piano
- The Only One (2018), song cycle for female jazz singer and large ensemble, dedicated to Nora Fischer, who premiered the work at The Proms 2019
- May (2019), for choir and orchestra

== Sources ==
- Schönberger, Elmer (2001). "Andriessen family". Grove Music Online. Oxford: Oxford University Press. doi:10.1093/gmo/9781561592630.article.47613. ISBN 978-1-56159-263-0. (subscription, Wikilibrary access, or UK public library membership required)
