= Reinbert de Leeuw =

Dutch conductor (1938–2020)

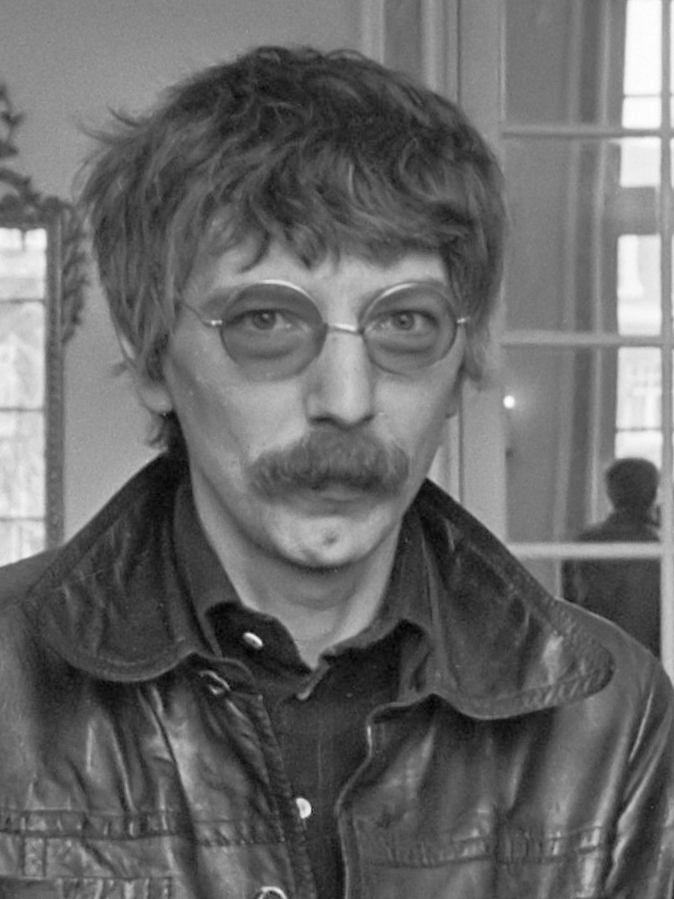
De Leeuw at the Holland Festival 1976 at the Concertgebouw in Amsterdam

Lambertus Reiner "Reinbert" de Leeuw (8 September 1938 – 14 February 2020) was a Dutch conductor, pianist and composer.

== Life ==
Lambertus Reinier de Leeuw's mother and father were both psychiatrists: Cornelis Homme 'Kees' de Leeuw (1905-1953) and Adriana Judina 'Dien' Aalbers (1908-1957). From age 7, he took piano lessons. He studied music theory and piano at the Amsterdam Conservatoire and composition with Kees van Baaren at the Royal Conservatory of The Hague.

He taught at the Royal Conservatoire of The Hague. He was a well-known conductor and pianist performing mainly contemporary music. He was the founder of the “Dutch Charles Ives Society”. Since 2004, he was a professor at the Leiden University in 'performing and creative arts of the 19th, 20th and 21st century'.

In 1974, he founded the Schönberg Ensemble. They mainly focused on performing works by the Second Viennese School and the avant-garde. He composed the piece Etude (1983–1985) for the strings of the ensemble.

De Leeuw regularly conducted the Netherlands' major orchestras and ensembles, including the Royal Concertgebouw Orchestra, New Sinfonietta Amsterdam, Residentie Orchestra The Hague and ensembles such as the Netherlands Chamber Choir, the ASKO, the Netherlands Wind Ensemble, and the orchestras of the Dutch Public Radio. In the 1995–96 season, he was the centre point of the 'Carte Blanche' series in the Concertgebouw Amsterdam. He was involved in the organization of the series 'Contemporaries' at the Concertgebouw Amsterdam.

He was a regular guest in most European countries (France, Germany including the Berlin Philharmonic Orchestra, England, Belgium) and the United States (Tanglewood Festival, New World Symphony, Lincoln Center Chamber Music Group New York, in Aspen, and the St. Paul Chamber Orchestra in Minneapolis, and lectured at the Juilliard School of Music in New York), in Japan and Australia.

De Leeuw was involved in various opera productions at the Dutch National Opera in Amsterdam as well as with the Nederlandse Reisopera. Productions included works by Stravinsky (The Rake’s Progress), Louis Andriessen (Rosa - A Horse Drama; Writing to Vermeer), György Ligeti (Le Grand Macabre), Claude Vivier (Rêves d’un Marco Polo), Robert Zuidam (Rage d‘Amours) and Benjamin Britten (The Turn of the Screw). In 2011, De Leeuw conducted Schoenberg's monumental Gurre-Lieder, which was the realisation of an old ambition of his.

In 1992, he was guest artistic director of the Aldeburgh Festival and from 1994–1998 artistic director of Tanglewood Festival of Contemporary Music. De Leeuw was artistic advisor for contemporary music with the Sydney Symphony Orchestra, and from 2001 to 2010, he served as artistic leader at the Nederlandse Orkest- en Ensemble-Academie (NJO; Dutch Orchestra and Ensemble Academy).

He is particularly noted for his shows and recordings of Erik Satie's works. He recorded an album, Socrate, with Barbara Hannigan, a Canadian contemporary opera singer, consisting of largely forgotten works by Erik Satie.

On January 13, 2020, he held his last concert in Muziekgebouw aan 't IJ. On February 14 of the same year, he died at his home in Amsterdam, aged 81, survived by his brothers, Kees and Hans de Leeuw.

=== Awards ===
On his 70th birthday, de Leeuw was made a Knight of the Order of the Netherlands Lion.

=== Recordings ===
Perhaps de Leeuw's most notable recordings are those of early piano music of Erik Satie. De Leeuw recorded mostly for Philips, Koch, Deutsche Grammophon, and Nonesuch. One of his last studio recordings was, however, for Alpha Classics: a piano-accompanied reading of Franz Liszt's own late and devotional Via Crucis, reflecting De Leeuw's faith. He had previously recorded Via Crucis twice, in the 1980s for Philips and in 2012 for Etcetera.

== Compositions ==
=== Stage ===
- 1969 Reconstructie, opera jointly composed with Louis Andriessen, Misha Mengelberg, Peter Schat and Jan van Vlijmen
- 1977 Axel, opera in 3 acts, jointly composed with Jan van Vlijmen

=== Orchestral ===
- 1965 Interplay for orchestra
- 1971–1973 Abschied, Symphonic poem for large orchestra
- 2013 Der nächtliche Wanderer, Symphonic poem for large orchestra

=== Works for Ensemble ===
- 1970 Hymns and Chorals, for 15 brass instruments, electric guitar, electric bass, electric organ and electronics

=== Vocal music ===
- 2003 Im wunderschönen Monat Mai 21 songs with excerpts of works by Robert Schumann and Franz Schubert, for voice and 14 instruments (or piano)

=== Chamber music ===
- 1962–1963 Quartetto per archi
- 1983–1985 Etude for string quartet

=== Piano works ===
- 1964 Music for piano I
- 1966 Music for piano II

=== Arrangement ===
- 1982 Vorspiel und Isoldens Liebestod by Richard Wagner, for ensemble
- 1983 Kindertotenlieder by Gustav Mahler, for voice and ensemble
- 2010 Das Lied von der Erde by Gustav Mahler, for 2 soloists and 15 instruments
