= Spaanderman =

Spaanderman is a surname. Notable people with the surname include:

- Jaap Spaanderman (1896–1985), Dutch pianist, cellist, and conductor
- Llane Spaanderman (born 1986), Australian rules footballer
