= Hauke Egermann =

German musicologist

Hauke Egermann is a German musicologist and university professor (a status equivalent to a distinguished professor in the German academic system) for systematic musicology at the University of Cologne, one of the largest universities in Germany. His research is situated in the field of Music psychology, specializing in the fields of music and emotion, empirical aesthetics of music, intercultural music cognition, audience research, and music, media, technology.

== Early life ==
Egermann went to school at the Landesgymnasium Wernigerode and completed his Abitur in 2000, majoring in music and mathematics.

== Academic career ==
From 2001 to 2006, Egermann studied systematic musicology, media and communication science at the Hochschule für Musik, Theater und Medien Hannover. From 2003 to 2009, he worked at the Institute of Music Physiology and Musicians’ Medicine (Institut für Musikphysiologie und Musikermedizin). He earned the degree Magister Artium (the German pre-Bologna equivalent of Master of Arts) in 2006 with a thesis on “Emotional Experiences During Music Listening: An Online Study of Continuous Emotion Measurement Using the Internet”. He then continued his studies at the Center for Systems Neuroscience (Zentrum für Systemische Neurowissenschaften) in Hannover, completing his PhD in 2009 with a thesis on “Social Influences On Emotions Experienced During Music Listening”. In his next career step, Egermann moved to McGill University in Montreal, Canada, working as a postdoctoral research fellow at the Centre for Interdisciplinary Research in Music Media and Technology. From 2011 to 2015, he worked at the Technische Universität Berlin (TU Berlin) in the Audio Communication Group, with a stay as a visiting research fellow at the Center for Digital Music at Queen Mary University of London in 2015. In 2016, Egermann received his habilitation in musicology at the TU Berlin. In the same year, he was hired as an assistant professor (lecturer) at the Department of Music, University of York in the UK, subsequently being promoted to associate professor (senior lecturer). In York, he founded and directed the York Music Psychology Group, which is active to the present day (2025). In 2021, Egermann was appointed university professor at the Technical University of Dortmund. In 2023, he became university professor at the University of Cologne, a position he holds currently. He also directs the Cologne Systematic Musicology Lab and is spokesperson of the systematic musicology professional group within the German Musicological Society (Gesellschaft für Musikforschung).

== Academic achievements ==
Egermann's research in music and emotion had a significant impact in the field of music psychology, resulting in a h-index of currently 24 (April 2025). He also has acquired research funding from several sources, the largest grants being funded by the European Union/European Commission Horizon 2020 grant for the Artist-to-Business-to-Business-to-Consumer Audio Branding System "ABC_DJ" project (in which Egermann was involved as a cooperation partner) and the Experimental Concert Research project funded by the Volkswagen Foundation (VolkswagenStiftung) in which Egermann was an co-investigator.

Within the Horizon 2020 project, Egermann's workforce was tasked with developing an algorithm to predict perceptions of musical expression in branding processes, resulting in a paper amongst other things. The total grant encompassed approximately 3.5 million Euro.

Approximately 1.3 million Euro have been rewarded by the Volkswagen Foundation (VolkswagenStiftung) to a research team consisting of sociologist Martin Tröndle (principal investigator), Egermann, psychologist Wolfgang Tschacher, and head of the department of music at the Max Planck Institute for Empirical Aesthetics Melanie Wald-Fuhrmann.

== Reception in media ==
Egermann has appeared in public media on multiple occasions as an expert regarding questions of musical impact in different contexts, including a TEDx talk given in Ghent about emotional responses to music with approximately 270 000 views on YouTube(April 2025).

== Selected publications ==
- Egermann, H., Fernando, N., Chuen, L., & McAdams, S. (2015). Music induces universal emotion-related psychophysiological responses: Comparing Canadian listeners to Congolese Pygmies. Frontiers in Psychology, 5. https://doi.org/10.3389/fpsyg.2014.01341
- Egermann, H., & McAdams, S. (2013). Empathy and Emotional Contagion as a Link Between Recognized and Felt Emotions in Music Listening. Music Perception, 31(2), 139–156. https://doi.org/10.1525/mp.2013.31.2.139
- Egermann, H., Pearce, M. T., Wiggins, G. A., & McAdams, S. (2013). Probabilistic models of expectation violation predict psychophysiological emotional responses to live concert music. Cognitive, Affective, & Behavioral Neuroscience, 13(3), 533–553. https://doi.org/10.3758/s13415-013-0161-y
- Egermann, H., Sutherland, M. E., Grewe, O., Nagel, F., Kopiez, R., & Altenmüller, E. (2011). Does music listening in a social context alter experience? A physiological and psychological perspective on emotion. Musicae Scientiae, 15(3), 307–323. https://doi.org/10.1177/1029864911399497
- Lepa, S., Müller-Lindenberg, R., & Egermann, H. (Eds.). (2023). Classical Music and Opera During and after the COVID-19 Pandemic: Empirical Research on the Digital Transformation of Socio-Cultural Institutions and Aesthetic Forms (1st ed). Springer, ISBN 978-3-031-42975-0
