= Henriëtte Bosmans =

Dutch composer (1895–1952)

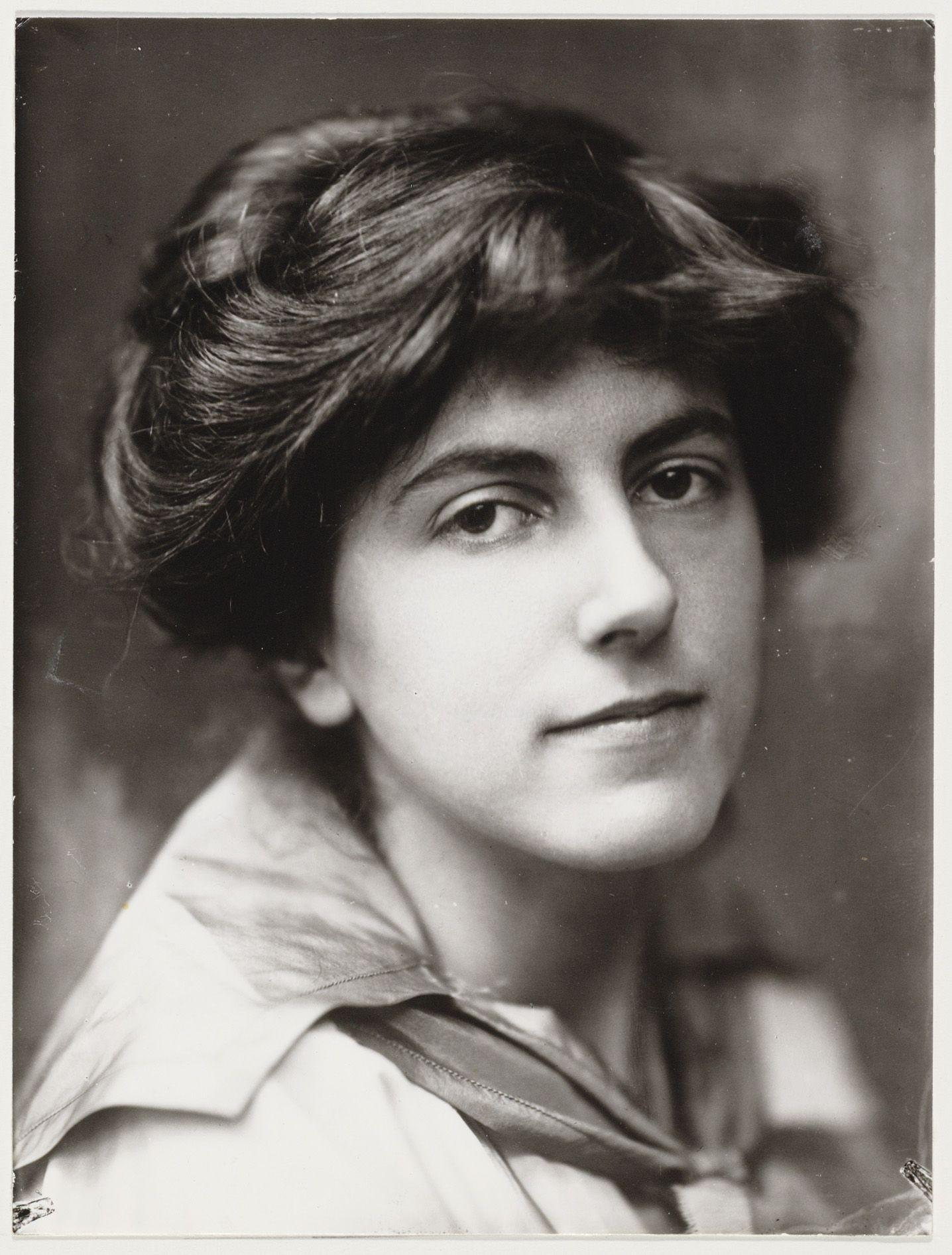
- Born: 6 December 1895; Amsterdam, Netherlands
- Died: 2 July 1952 (aged 56); Amsterdam, Netherlands
- Occupations: Pianist, music teacher, composer
- Partner(s): Frieda Belinfante, Noémie Pérugia, Francis Koene
- Parent(s): Henri Bosmans, Sarah Bosmans-Benedicts

Henriëtte Hilda Bosmans (6 December 1895 – 2 July 1952) was a Dutch composer and pianist.

== Early life and education ==
Bosmans was born in Amsterdam, Netherlands, the daughter of Henri Bosmans (1856–1896), principal cellist of the Royal Concertgebouw Orchestra, and the pianist Sarah Benedicts, piano teacher at the Amsterdam Conservatory. Her father died when she was six months old. She studied piano with her mother and composition with Jan Willem Kersbergen, Cornelis Dopper and Willem Pijper. She became a piano teacher herself at the age of 17.

== Career ==
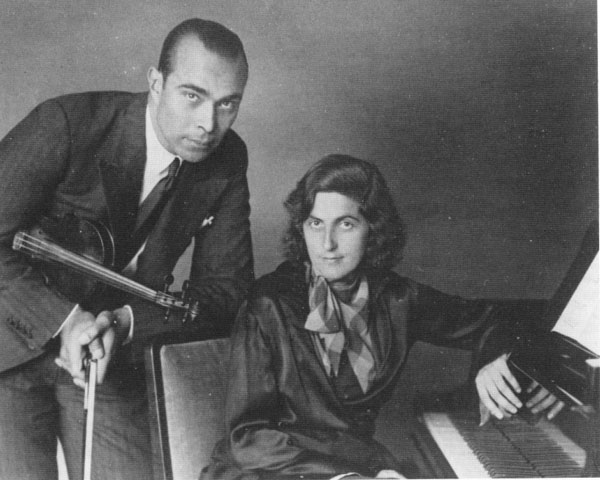
Francis Koene and Henriëtte Bosmans, 1922. Jacob Merkelbach, Leiden University Library, Prentenkabinet.

Bosmans debuted as a concert pianist in 1915 in Utrecht. She performed throughout Europe with among others Pierre Monteux, Willem Mengelberg and Ernest Ansermet. She gave 22 concerts with the Concertgebouw Orchestra alone between 1929 and 1949. She played her Concertino for piano and orchestra at a concert in Geneva in 1929. In 1940, her Concertstuk for violin and orchestra was performed in concert by the Cincinnati Symphony Orchestra, with soloist Ruth Posselt, who took it up again the following year with the Boston Symphony Orchestra.

Because her mother was Jewish, Bosmans was under the scrutiny of authorities during the German occupation, and by 1942 she could no longer perform on public stages in the Netherlands. Her aged mother was arrested and deported, but Bosmans and others intervened to rescue her from further detention. Unable to work as a musician, and needing to care for her mother through wartime famine and other dangers, Bosmans focused again on composing. One of her songs, Daar komen de Canadezen ("Here come the Canadians") "became an anthem of liberation" as the war ended and Allied soldiers arrived in the Netherlands.

After the war, Bosmans published her compositions. She wrote a series of songs for her partner, French mezzo-soprano Noémie Pérugia, between 1949 and 1952. She was knighted in 1951, a member of the Royal Order of Orange-Nassau.

== Personal life and legacy ==
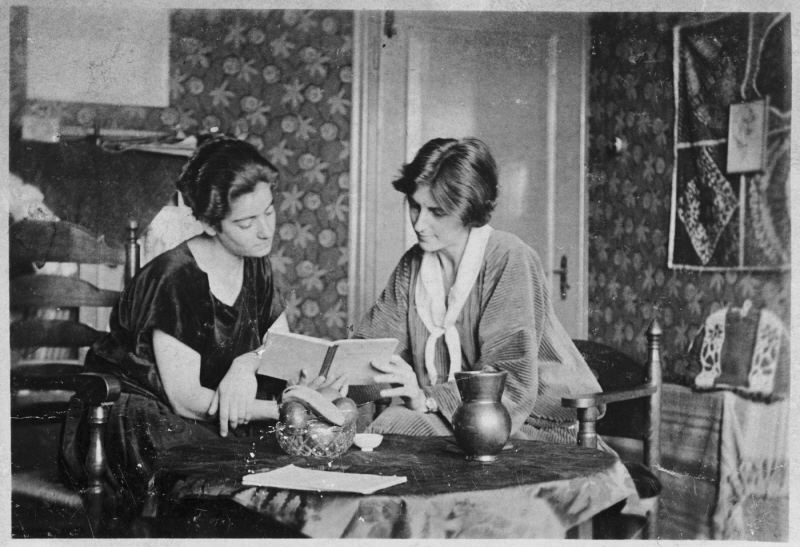
Frieda Belinfante and Henriëtte Bosmans

Bosmans had relationships with both men and women, with whom she often also collaborated musically. She was partnered from 1920–1927 to the Dutch cellist and conductor Frieda Belinfante, a prominent lesbian and member of the Dutch Resistance during World War II, who in 1923 premiered Bosmans' Second Cello Concerto. She was later engaged, briefly, to the violinist Francis Koene, who died from a brain tumor in January 1934, before they could be married. Bosmans died from stomach cancer in 1952, aged 56 years, in Amsterdam. Her grave is in the city's Zorgvlied cemetery.

The Henriëtte Bosmans Prize, named after Bosmans, is an encouragement prize for young Dutch composers. The prize, consisting of €2500 (US$3500) and a performance, has been awarded since 1994 by the Society of Dutch Composers. In 2017, Dutch-Canadian singer Pauline van der Roest gave a concert of works by Bosmans, in Ottawa. In 2020, North American musicians Leah Plave and Dan Sato made a new recording of the complete works of Bosmans for cello and piano.

In March 2022 (repeated August 2023) BBC Radio 3 broadcast, in its Composer of the Week series, a set of five hour-long programmes about the life and works of Bosmans, including some recordings specially made for the programme.

== Selected works ==
- Arietta for violin and piano (1917)
- Six Preludes for piano (1917–1918)
- Sonata for violin and piano (1918)
- Sonata for cello and piano (1919)
- Nocturne for cello and harp (1921)
- Piano trio (1921)
- Concerto in D for cello and orchestra (1922)
- Poème for cello and orchestra (1923)
- Concerto No. 2 for cello and orchestra (1923)
- Impressions for cello and piano (1926)
- String quartet (1927)
- Concertino for piano and orchestra (1928)
- Concertstuk for flute and chamber orchestra (1929)
- Concertstuk for violin and orchestra (1934)
- Belsazer for voice and orchestra (1936)
- Doodenmarsch for spoken voice and orchestra (1944)
- Daar komen de Canadezen for voice and piano (1945)
- Lead, kindly light for voice and orchestra (1945)
- Vieille chanson for piano (1948)

=== Selected recordings ===
- Songs. Henriëtte Bosmans and her circle, Julia Bronkhorst / Maarten Hillenius, Challenge Records GLO 5183 (2002)
- Violin Sonata, Piano Trio, Arietta. Solarek Piano Trio, Toccata TOCC0654 (2022)
- Cello Concertos Nos. 1 and 2, Poème. Raphael Wallfisch (cello), BBC Scottish Symphony Orchestra, conductor Ed Spanjaard, CPO 555694-2 (2025)
- Poème for cello and orchestra, Lead, kindly light, Concertstuk for violin and orchestra, Cello Concerto No. 2. Gemma Rosefield (cello), Benjamin Nabarro (violin), Rowan Pierce (soprano), BBC Philharmonic Orchestra, conductor George Vass, Resonus RES10369 (2025)
- Cello Sonata, Nocturne, Impressions. Raphael Wallfisch, Ed Spanjaard, Sharron Griffiths, CPO 555737-2 (2025)
