= List of schools in West Flanders =

Coordinates: 50°59′48.8″N 2°55′27.3″E

An incomplete list of schools in the province of West Flanders, Belgium.

== B ==
- Bruges
  - Beernem
    - Land- en Tuinbouwinstituut 't Brugse Vrije
    - St. Lutgartinstituut
  - Blankenberge
    - Koninklijk Atheneum Maerlant Blankenberge-de Haan
    - Middenschool van het Gemeenschapsonderwijs Maerlant
    - St. Pieterscollege - St. Jozefshandelsschool
  - Bruges
    - Assebroek
      - Koninklijk Atheneum III
      - Middenschool V Assebroek - St. Kruis
      - Onze-Lieve-Vrouwecollege
    - Bruges (Centre)
      - College of Europe
      - Hotel- en Toerismeschool Spermalie
      - Koninklijk Atheneum I
      - Lyceum Hemelsdaele
      - Middenschool Brugge Centrum
      - St. Andreasinstituut Humaniora
      - St. Franciscus-Xaveriusinstituut
      - St. Jozefinstituut Handel en Toerisme
      - St. Jozefinstituut Humaniora
      - St. Leocollege
      - Stedelijke Academie voor Schone Kunsten
      - Technisch Instituut Heilige Familie
      - Vrij Technisch Instituut - Brugge
      - Vrij Technisch Instituut - Brugge Middenschool
    - Lissewege
      - Onze-Lieve-Vrouw Ter Duinen 1
      - Onze-Lieve-Vrouw Ter Duinen 2
    - St. Andries
      - Abdijschool van Zevenkerken
      - Koninklijk Atheneum II
      - Koninklijk Technisch Atheneum Vesaliusinstituut Oostende
      - Onze-Lieve-Vrouw-Hemelvaart Instituut
      - St. Lodewijkscollege
      - Vrij Technisch Instituut - Brugge
      - Vrij Technisch Instituut - Brugge Middenschool
    - St. Kruis
      - Instituut Mariawende-Blydhove
      - Middelbare Rudolf Steinerschool Vlaanderen
      - St. Andreaslyceum
    - St. Michiels
      - Brood- en banketbakkerijschool Ter Groene Poorte
      - Hotelschool en Slagerijschool Ter Groene Poorte
      - Immaculata-Instituut
      - Koninklijk Technisch Atheneum
      - Vrij Handels- en Sportinstituut St. Michiels
  - Knokke-Heist
    - Koninklijk Atheneum
    - Middenschool
    - St. Bernardusinstituut
    - St. Jozefsinstituut Lyceum
    - Onze-Lieve-Vrouw Ter Duinen 1
    - Onze-Lieve-Vrouw Ter Duinen 2
  - Oostkamp
    - Middenschool St. Pieter
  - Torhout
    - Koninklijk Technisch Atheneum
    - Middenschool St. Rembert 1
    - Middenschool St. Rembert 2
    - Middenschool St. Rembert 3
    - St. Jozefscollege
    - St. Jozefsinstituut
    - Technisch Instituut St. Vincentius
    - Vrij Technisch Instituut St. Aloysius
    - Vrij Land- en Tuinbouwinstituut
  - Zedelgem
    - Spes Nostra Instituut

== D ==
- Diksmuide
  - Diksmuide
    - Koninklijk Technisch Atheneum
    - Middenschool
    - St. Aloysiuscollege
    - Vrij Technisch Instituut
  - Koekelare
    - Instituut St. Martinus
    - Koninklijk Technisch Atheneum
  - Kortemark
    - Margareta-Maria-Instituut
  - Kortrijk
    - Kortrijk Conservatory

== O ==
- Ostend
  - Bredene
    - Koninklijk Technisch Atheneum II Ensorinstituut Oostende
    - Koninklijk Werk IBIS
  - De Haan
    - Koninklijk Atheneum Maerlant Blankenberge-de Haan
  - Gistel
    - Koninklijk Technisch Atheneum
    - St. Godelievecollege
  - Ichtegem
    - St. Godelievecollege
  - Ostend
    - HBO voor verpleegkunde St. Jan - St. Jozef
    - Koninklijk Atheneum I
    - Koninklijk Technisch Atheneum I Oostende
    - Koninklijk Technisch Atheneum II Ensorinstituut Oostende
    - Koninklijk Technisch Atheneum Vesaliusinstituut Oostende
    - Middenschool I
    - Maritiem Instituut 'Mercator'
    - Onze-Lieve-Vrouwecollege
    - Pegasus - Koninklijk Atheneum II
    - St. Andreas Middenschool
    - St. Andreasinstituut
    - St. Jozefsinstituut
    - Vrij Technisch Instituut

== R ==
- Roeselare
  - Ardooie
    - Instituut Heilige Kindsheid Ardooie
  - Ingelmunster
    - Instituut Edelweiss
  - Izegem
    - Instituut de Pelichy Ave Maria
    - Koninklijk Atheneum
    - Middenschool
    - Middenschool J. de Pelichy
    - Middenschool de Pelichy Ave Maria
    - St. Jozefscollege
    - Vrij Technisch Instituut Izegem
  - Lichtervelde
    - Middenschool St. Rembert 1
  - Roeselare
    - Klein Seminarie Roeselare
