= Brussels Philharmonic Orchestra =

Belgian orchestra

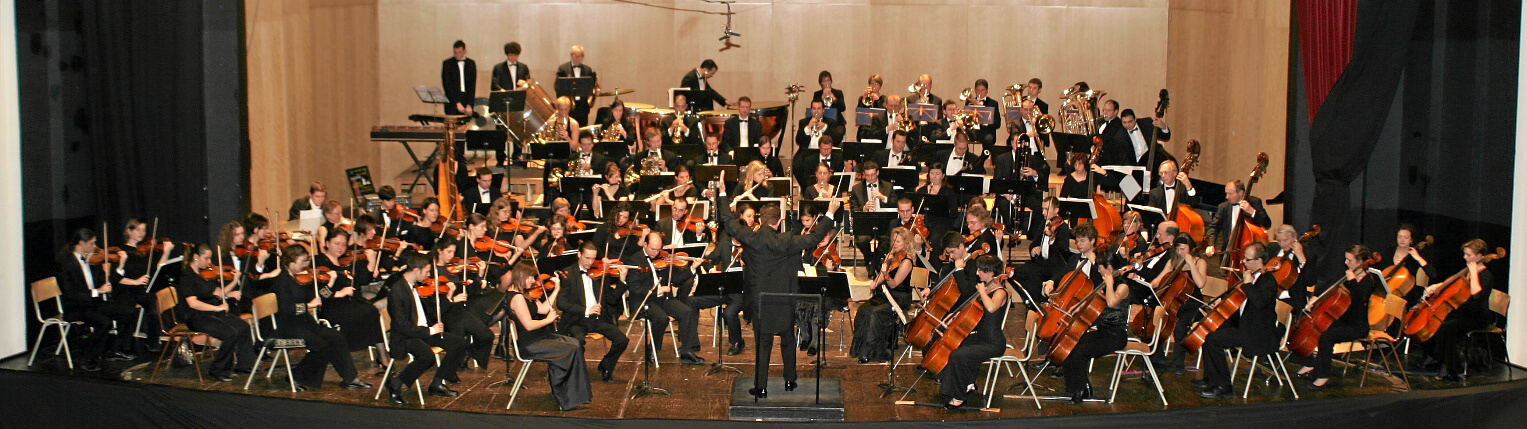
Théâtre Saint Michel

The Brussels Philharmonic Orchestra (BPhO) is a Belgian orchestra based in Brussels that was established in 2002 by Antonio Vilardi, then artistic director of the Théâtre Saint-Michel, Clare Roberts, a French horn player, and Roger Bausier, then a professor at the Royal Conservatory of Brussels. Bausier acted as principal conductor of the orchestra until his death in 2012. In January 2014, David Navarro Turres became the orchestra's principal conductor and artistic adviser.

The orchestra is intended as a training entity to allow young musicians opportunities to perform regularly as part of a large ensemble in preparation for their professional careers and includes musicians from more than twenty countries as of 2012. The BPhO holds three concerts each year at the Royal Conservatory of Brussels and previously performed at the Théâtre Saint-Michel in Etterbeek. In Brussels, in addition to the Royal Conservatory, the BPhO performs in such venues as the Centre for Fine Arts, Brussels, and Wolubilis. The BPhO has made a point of programming Belgian compositions, including works by Dirk Brossé, François Glorieux, Jacques Leduc, Frédéric van Rossum, Didier Van Damme, Jan Van der Roost, Frédéric Devreese, Robert Janssens, Max Vandermaesbrugge, August de Boeck and Marcel Poot.
