= François Glorieux =

Belgian composer (1932–2023)

- Glorieux, c. 2015
- Born: 27 August 1932; Kortrijk, Belgium
- Died: 22 September 2023 (aged 91)
- Education: Royal Conservatory of Ghent
- Occupations: Conductor; Composer; Pianist; Musicologist; Academic teacher
- Awards: Harriet Cohen International Music Award; Order of Leopold II
- Website: www.francoisglorieux.com

François Glorieux (27 August 1932 – 22 September 2023) was a Belgian pianist, conductor, composer, musicologist, and academic teacher who performed internationally. As a pianist, he received the Harriet Cohen International Music Award in 1967, toured in Germany and Austria with conductor André Cluytens, and later focused on improvisation. He conducted orchestras such as the BBC Radio Orchestra, bands such as Stan Kenton's, and four ensembles that he founded. As a composer, he wrote music for his groups, and arrangements for Michael Jackson, among others. He taught as director of the International Piano Master Class in Antwerp from 1972, and internationally, both as a guest at universities and in school concerts.

== Life and career ==
Glorieux was born in Kortrijk on 27 August 1932. He showed early talent for music, composing already in his youth. He began studies at the Royal Conservatory of Ghent at age 17, piano with Marcel Gazelle and composition with George Lonque.

Glorieux led nearly 6000 recitals and concerts in around 60 countries. He toured Germany and Austria as a pianist with André Cluytens conducting. Glorieux conducted the Brussels Philharmonic Orchestra, the Locke Brass Consort and BBC Radio Orchestra in the UK, the Stan Kenton band in the US, the Kyiv Chamber Orchestra, and the Mainzer Kammerorchester, among others. He collaborated with the Ballet of the 20th Century of Maurice Béjart, and also worked with the Royal Ballet of Flanders, Nederlands Dans Theater in The Hague, and the Dutch National Ballet in Amsterdam, inspired by choreographers Valery Panov, André Leclair, John Koning, Ava Corelli and Monette Loza. He founded four different ensembles: Instrumentarium, Panoramic Trio, Brass and Percussion Orchestra, and Revivat Scaldis Chamber Orchestra.

As a composer, Glorieux was inspired by Debussy and Ravel, jazz, blues and Latin-American rhythms. He improvised in free forms, with sometimes sudden shifts in dynamics, tempo and rhythm, with "wit, refinement and cosmopolitan sophistication". He created symphonic arrangements at the request of Michael Jackson. His discography includes 175 CDs and LPs.

Glorieux was director of the International Piano Master Class in Antwerp from 1972. He was honorary professor of chamber music at the Ghent Conservatory, honorary professor at the Kortrijk Conservatory, and guest professor at Yale University. He would give a number of school concerts in Belgium, Germany, the Americas and Japan. His works were published by United Music & Media Publishers and HAFABRA Music.

Glorieux died on 22 September 2023, at age 91.

== Compositions ==
Compositions by Glorieux include:

- Concerto for euphonium and band
- London Proms, overture
- November, for trombone and band
- Orgia
- Régis Glorieux, march
- Sketches, for trombone and band
- Summer Meeting 77

== Awards ==
- Harriet Cohen International Music Award (1967)
- Lieven Gevaert Prize (1985)
- Honorary Citizen of Kortrijk (2002)
- Give soul to Europe, award from the European Commission (2012)
- Knight of the Order of Leopold II (2015)
