= Musicians' Medicine =

- Field: Medicine, Music, Physiology
- Origin: 1832 (Karl Sundelin)
- Key people: Kurt Singer, Eckart Altenmüller, Claudia Spahn
- Purpose: Prevention and treatment of physical and psychological conditions affecting musicians

Musicians' medicine deals with physical and mental issues suffered by musicians ('Musicians' illnesses').

It is sometimes also referred to as Music Medicine, which also describes different forms of music therapy. The related field of music physiology consists of research of physiological foundations of making music as well as the prevention of common health problems in musicians. The term Musicians' Health, often used as a synonym for Musicians' Medicine, generally refers to the health maintenance and wellbeing of musicians, as well as preventive measures, such as sufficient and appropriate exercise, a healthy diet, and enough sleep.

The studies also include mental health problems, for instance stage fright.

== Research and Science ==
As early as 1832, Karl Sundelin published his Medical Guidebook for Musicians. Later, around the turn of the century, Adolf Steinhausen (1859–1910) published multiple tracts on music medicine. Then, in the 1920s, Julius Flesch wrote about Berufskrankheiten des Musikers (Occupational Diseases of the Musician) (Celle, 1925). The neurologist Kurt Singer published his book Berufskrankheiten der Musiker (Occupational diseases of musicians). From 1923, Singer taught at the Hochschule für Musik Hanns Eisler Berlin. The Kurt-Singer-Institute for Music Physiology and Musicians’ Health in Berlin (Academy of Arts and Hochschule für Musik Hans Eisler), currently headed by Alexander Schmidt, was named after him. Further institutions for Musicians' Medicine are the Institute of Music Physiology and Musicians' Medicine at the Hanover University of Music, Drama and Media, founded by Christoph Wagner in 1974 and headed by Eckart Altenmüller since 1994, as well as the Freiburg Institute for Musicians’ Medicine, founded in 2005 and headed by Claudia Spahn and Bernhard Richter. In the former GDR, the field was studied at the Occupational Health Clinic of theatres and orchestras in Berlin. Further institutes and departments for Music Physiology and Musicians' Medicine are located at the Universities of Music in Weimar, Leipzig, Dresden and Frankfurt, as well as the Düsseldorf University Hospital and the Rechts der Isar Hospital in Munich.

In 1994, the German Society for Music Physiology and Musicians' Medicine was founded and holds annual conferences. Similar associations have been established in Switzerland, Austria, France, the UK, the Netherlands, the US and New Zealand since the 1990s.

== Common health problems ==
The most common problems are related to overstressing particular muscles, tendons and joints, especially the arms and hands. Of the 264,000 professional musicians working in the US in 2006, 50-76% (depending on the instrument) suffered work-related musculoskeletal ailments. Women were affected more often than men (70% vs 52%). These problems occur most commonly between the ages of 20 and 40. Risk factors are a general hyperlaxicity, abrupt increase in training and rehearsal times, a change of conductor, bad posture, wrong use of the instrument and general stress.

Common medical conditions are:

- Enthesopathy especially of the underarms and hands
- Tenosynovitis and Tendinopathy
- Nerve compression syndrome such as the carpal tunnel syndrome or ulnar neuropathy at the elbow
- Focal dystonia with uncontrollable spastic muscle contractions
- Osteoarthritis mostly in the carpometacarpal joint (trapeziometacarpal osteoarthritis), in the carpus, the finger joints (heberden's node)
- Thoracic outlet syndrome
- Tinnitus
- Noise-induced hearing loss
- Stage fright

Some illnesses are typical for certain instruments. For example, playing the violin, the viola or wind instruments often lead to changes in the mouth cavity, jaw, teeth or face.

Musicians in orchestras are often seated close together in orchestra pits and are exposed to high sound levels. Due to the positioning of the orchestra, sound is often not loud enough and doesn't reach the audience and therefore has to be amplified. Over the course of the last centuries, orchestra music has become increasingly louder. This can lead to lasting hearing loss and tinnitus. Such problems emerge slowly and often unnoticed. Musicians suffering from these conditions have to concentrate more while playing their instrument, resulting in insecurities and stress. In some cases even minor hearing problems can hinder their work.

== Prevention and therapy ==
Musicians medicine is mainly concerned with prevention, which means educating musicians about preventative measures. These can be ergonomic adjustments of the instruments to the musician's body, good chairs, appropriate exercises and basic physiological and anatomical knowledge, as well as healthy eating habits and sufficient sleep.

Additionally, relaxation techniques can be helpful, for example progressive muscle relaxation (Jacobsen), autogenic training, meditation, Tai chi and Qigong. Furthermore, movement therapies such as Eutony, Alexander Technique, Feldenkrais Method, Dispokinesis and functional movement therapy are efficient in diagnosing and correcting bad posture. Such measures can not only prevent, but also reduce or even eradicate existing problems. Another commonly used form of therapy is osteopathy.

Currently, there is no cure for hearing damage. Many musicians are not aware of the health risks that come with being a musician. According to the German Occupational Safety Law relating to Noise and Vibration (Lärm- und Vibrations-Arbeitsschutzverordnung) employees have to be protected from damaging noise. Many employers often are not aware how demanding the job really is, since it includes many different tasks, such as teaching music or a lot of practice. For these instances, Germany set up a training programme to help identify how affected a musician is by being exposed to loud sounds and what preventative measures should be established. Since that exposure can vary significantly, the software related to the programme creates a weekly average.
