= Tjako van Schie =

Dutch pianist and composer

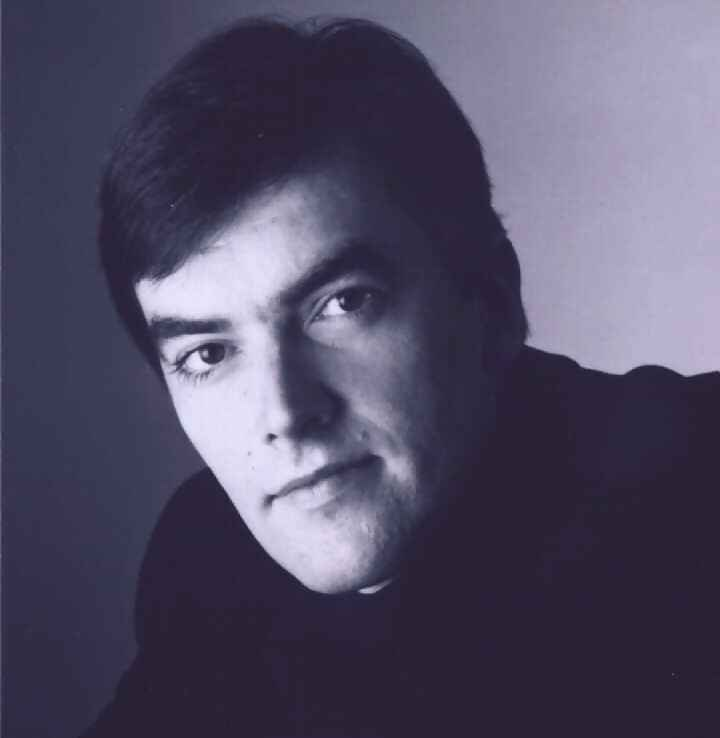
- Tjako van Schie
- Born: April 17, 1961 (age 65); Coevorden, Netherlands
- Occupations: Dutch composer, pianist and répétiteur

Tjako van Schie (born April 17, 1961 in Coevorden) is a Dutch pianist and composer. He is a répétiteur at the Amsterdam Conservatory.

== Biography ==
Since 1999 Van Schie has been working as a host professor at the conservatory of Porto (Portugal). In 2001 he toured the People's Republic of China. In the same year he toured in the Netherlands and in Portugal with the Orquestra Portuguesa de Saxofones, also known as Vento do Norte.

Van Schie also composes music as well as rearranges music. He wrote music for all kinds of musical ensembles, as well as rewritten old music. For example: he rewrote compositions of Robert Schumann to be performed by piano and saxophone ensemble.

In 2012 he played the piano for singer and soap actress Jette van der Meij.

Van Schie was educated at the Zwolle conservatory, after which he attended several master classes, among others at the New York pianist Jacob Lateiner.

== Recordings ==
Tjako van Schie sitting at the piano

- CD: The Goldberg Variations BWV 988 of Johann Sebastian Bach (1991)
- "Koninginnedagconcert" – CMK, with The Coevorder Mannenkoor (1991)
- "Overijssel Zingt" (double cd) – MIRASOUND, with various Overijssel choirs (1993)
- CD: Shtil di nakht iz oysgeshternt (The silent night is filled with stars) – Yiddish music from the ghetto's and concentration camps, 1995, EMI, newly re-edited by EMI in 2005: Tjako van Schie – piano & Adriaan Stoet – violin
- CD: Water bron van leven, 1998, compositions for piano by different composers about the 'water theme', with 4 compositions of his own and a piano solo version of Bedřich Smetana's The Moldau from Má Vlast
- "Akoestisch signaal" – MIRASOUND, with the Dutch Police Choir of Drenthe (1996)
- "Shtil di nakht iz oysgeshternt" – EMI, re-edition (2005)
- "Die Geigen, ja die Geigen!" – GILL/Sony, various composers (Adriaan Stoet-violin & Tjako van Schie-piano) (2008)
- "A Bag of Music" – Saxunlimited, 3 cd box (cd 1: "Vocalise", cd 2: "Petite Fleur", cd 3: "Wonderful World") with bariton saxophone player Henk van Twillert (2011)
