= Paul Gutama Soegijo =

Indonesian composer and musician (1934–2019)

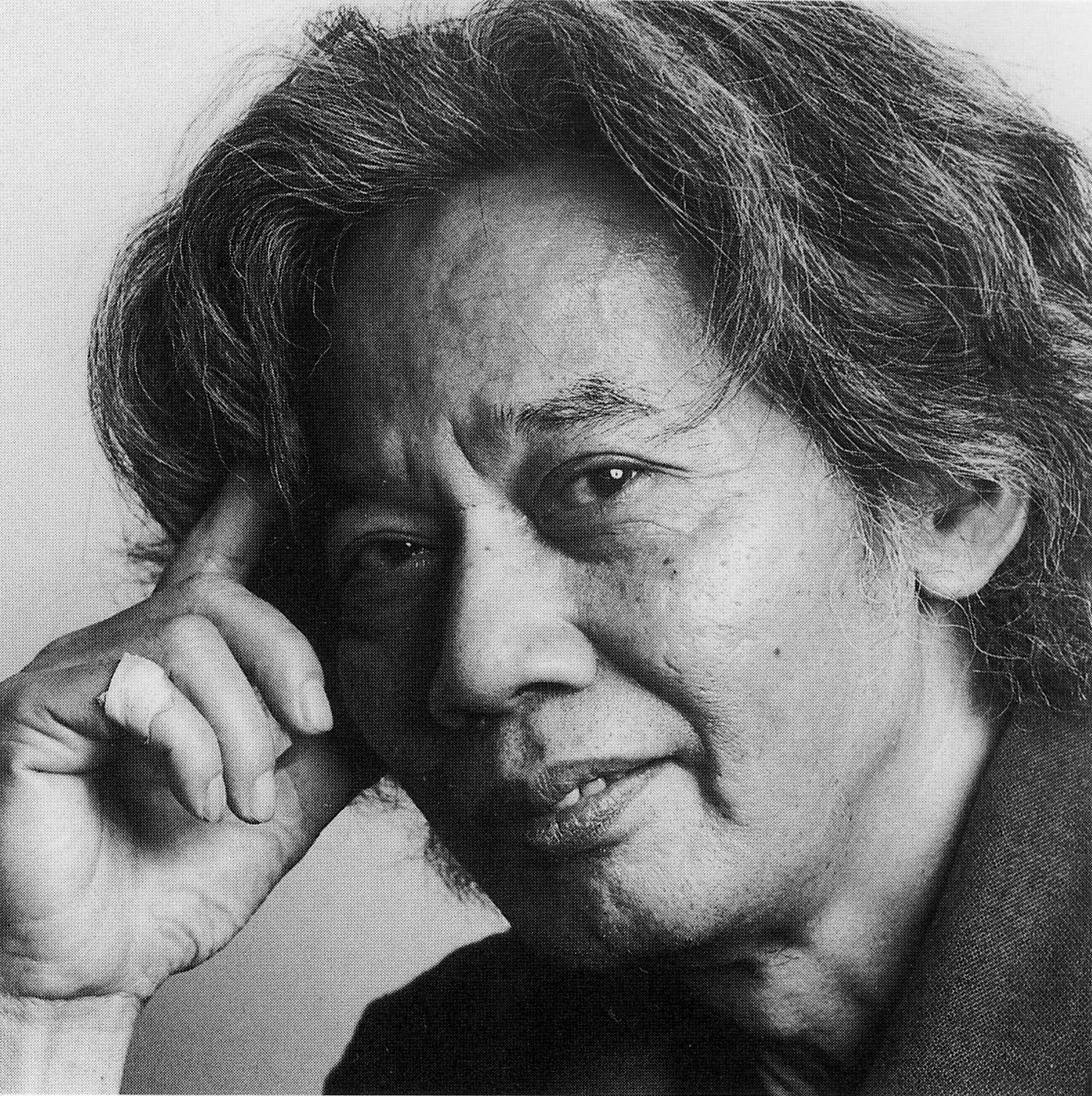
- Born: 29 January 1934; Yogyakarta, Dutch East Indies
- Died: 7 January 2019 (aged 84); Berlin, Germany
- Occupations: Composer; musician

Paul Gutama Soegijo (29 January 1934 – 7 January 2019) was an Indonesian composer and musician, active in Berlin. Born in Yogyakarta on the island of Java, Soegijo studied composition with Boris Blacher at Berlin's Hochschule für Musik. He began his compositional career in the experimental Neue Musik style but later transitioned to using elements of Indonesian music in his works, particularly the gamelan percussion instruments. He visited Indonesia between 1977 and 1985 to study the gamelan instruments, and in his later works he often combined Western influences with the gamelan traditions that he learned.

== Early life and education ==
Soegijo was born on 29 January 1934 in Yogyakarta on the island of Java, then a part of the Dutch East Indies. After studying the violin at the Indonesian College of Music, at 19 years old he was awarded a scholarship from the Catholic Mission to attend the Amsterdamsch Conservatorium in Amsterdam from 1957 to 1962. At the conservatory, he trained with teachers such as the Dutch composer Ton de Leeuw and graduated with degrees in violin and music theory. He then moved to Berlin in 1964 to study musical composition with the German composer Boris Blacher at the Hochschule für Musik (now the Berlin University of the Arts).

== Career ==
In 1967, Soegijo composed Musik für Vier Posaunen und Schlaginstrumente, a work for four trombones and percussion. It was received positively in Germany and launched his career as a composer. The following year he composed Klavierstudie for solo piano, which was later recorded by Steffen Schleiermacher on his CD Asia Piano Avantgarde: Indonesia. He incorporated Western Neue Musik techniques in his early works. Reviewing Asia Piano Avantgarde, Rob Haskins of American Record Guide described Klavierstudie as an "anxious" piece with "the nervous tic of 1960s avant-garde music". From 1968, Soegijo's compositions were published by Bote & Bock and played throughout Europe.

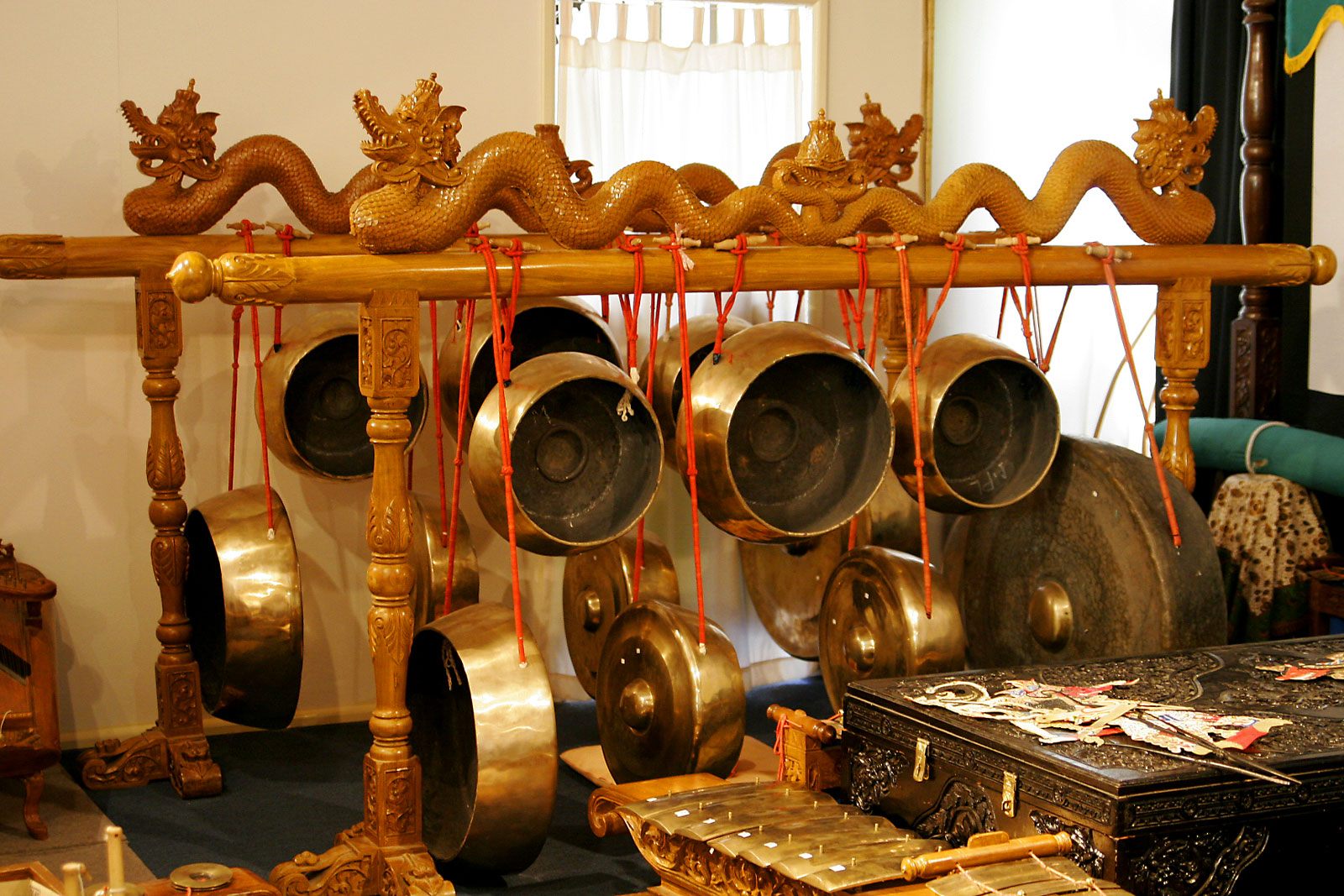
Hanging gongs, part of an Indonesian gamelan set

He founded an experimental ensemble, Banjar Gruppe Berlin, in 1973. The group specialised in playing pieces using musical instruments from around the world rather than traditional European instruments. During this time, Soegijo began a transition to a contemporary Indonesian style of music in his compositions for Banjar Gruppe, deviating from his previous Neue Musik style, and he developed an interest in the gamelan percussion instruments of Java and Bali. He travelled between Germany and Indonesia between 1977 and 1985 to learn their gamelan techniques and traditions. He then created a study curriculum for the gamelan instruments which he used to train the members of Banjar Gruppe. According to the Indonesian composer Franki Raden, the combination of Western influences and gamelan traditions in Soegijo's later works was termed "Musik der Neue Ursprünglichkeit" ("music of the new originality").

In 1999, Soegijo performed at the annual festival of the Asian Composers League which was held in Indonesia for the first time in the festival's history. In 2002, he composed Gefuehlsstau for solo percussion and dedicated it to his older brother, Gregorius Sidharta, as a birthday present. He performed the piece at the opening of Gregorius's sculpture exhibition in Jakarta; the brothers had previously collaborated in 1996. The composition was praised by Bintang Prakarsa of The Jakarta Post, who applauded its improvisational style and wrote that Soegijo was "as scrupulous as any Western (ethno)musicologists or composers".

== Later life and death ==
Soegijo retired from public performances in 2011 after performing with Banjar Gruppe Berlin at the Jakarta Berlin Arts Festival, which was held in Berlin and celebrated the culture of Jakarta. He died in Berlin on 7 January 2019 at the age of 84.
