= Francis Koene =

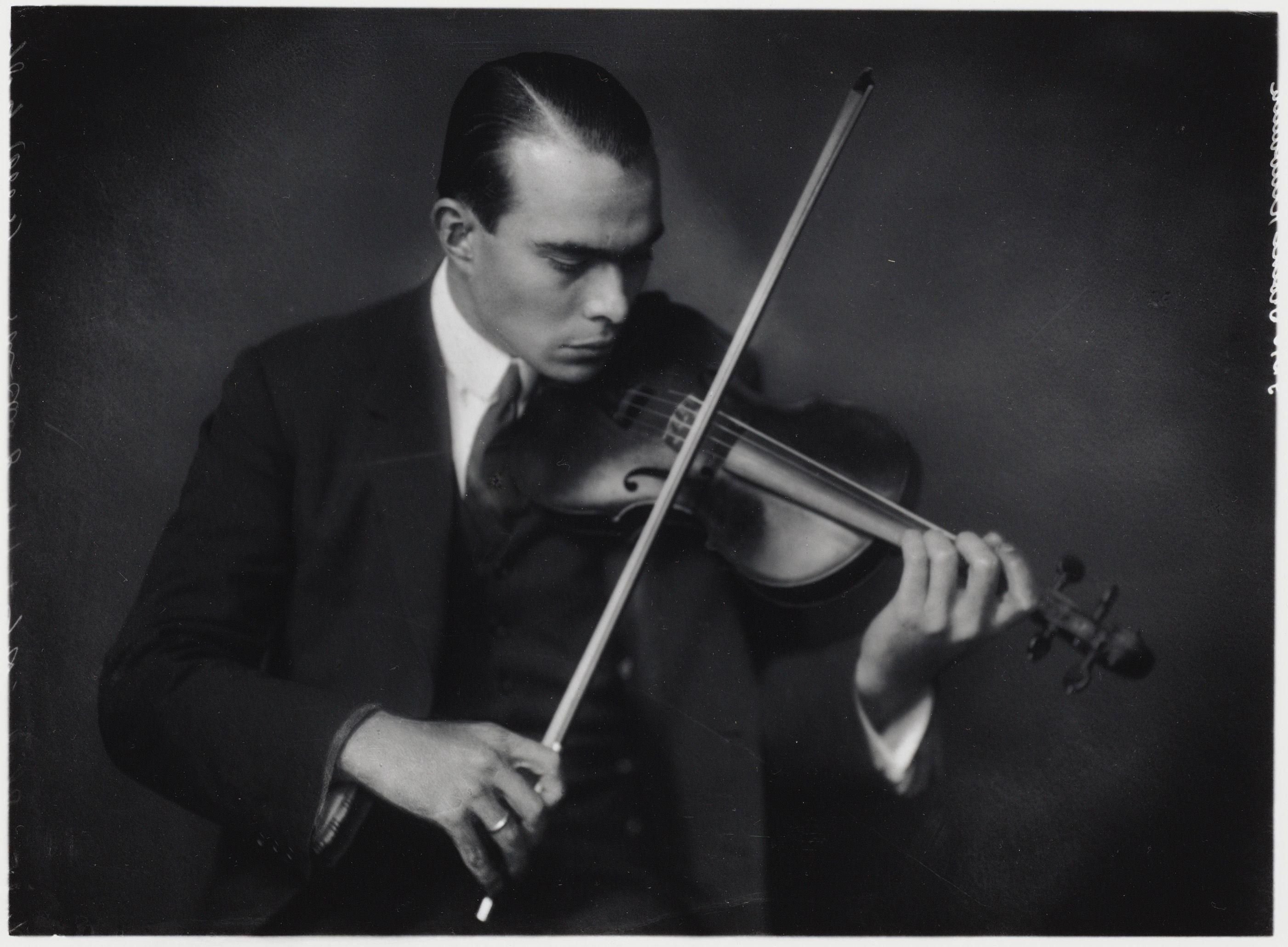
Publicity photo by Jacob Merkelbach circa 1922

Francis Dirk Jacobus Koene (Weltevreden, Java, Batavia, Dutch East Indies, 11 March 1899 – Amsterdam, 29 January 1935) was a Dutch classical music violinist. He and his two siblings were child prodigies who performed in Java as a trio. Their father was Dutch and their mother Javanese. In 1921 he became the second concertmaster of the Utrecht Symphony Orchestra, and from 1926 to 1932 was the first concertmaster of the Dresden Opera Orchestra.

In 1934, he became engaged to Dutch composer and concert pianist Henriëtte Bosmans. They never married, as in January 1934 Koene died of a brain tumor.
