= Noémie Pérugia =

French soprano

Noémie Pérugia (7 November 1903 – 25 March 1992) was a French soprano.

== Early life ==
Noémie Pérugia was born on 7 November, 1903, in Nice, France.

== Career ==
Of Italian roots, Pérugia made her debut in Giuseppe Verdi's Requiem in 1936 and in 1938, she won the Concours international Gabriel Fauré (Gabriel Fauré International Competition) and became the preferred interpreter of Gabriel Fauré's melodies throughout the world: Paris, United States, Netherlands. In 1941 she recorded Le jardin clos a song cycle based on a poem by Charles van Lerberghe:

The only performance which provides a striking insight into this elusive cycle – Alan Blyth.

At the end of the 1930s, she corresponded with Nadia Boulanger, French composer, conductor, and teacher, and was directed by her, often with Hugues Cuénod as a tenor:

- On April 26, 1939, she was the soloist soprano at Sanders Theater, Harvard University.
- On April 16, 1939, she was the soloist soprano at Dumbarton Oaks.

In September 1941, in Paris, Arthur Honegger dedicated to Pérugia the cycle Saluste du Bartas, performed on March 21, 1942, by the same Pérugia, who created the cycle, accompanied by Irène Aïtoff, at Salle Gaveau, Paris.

On May 1, 1942 Jacques Leguerney dedicated to Pérugia a song, performed on November 13, 1943, by the same Pérugia accompanied by Irène Aïtoff, at Salle Gaveau, Paris.

After the World War I, she devoted herself to the teaching and promotion of music: she taught at the École Normale de Musique de Paris, at the Académie Long-Thibaud and at the Schola Cantorum de Paris. She was a frequent lecturer in many conservatories around the world, working for the Ministry of Foreign Affairs: London, Amsterdam, Rome, Buenos Aires, and many more. She founded the Concours international d'interprétation et d'accompagnement (International Competition for Interpretation and Accompaniment) in Paris and Netherlands and the Académie de Chant et d'Art Lyrique (School of Voice and Lyric Arts), both of which bear her name. In Amsterdam, she founded the Concours Gabriel Fauré (Gabriel Fauré Competition).

In 1948 she was accompanied regularly by the pianist and composer Henriëtte Bosmans (1895–1952) with whom she formed a duo. Bosmans dedicates eleven of her melodies to Pérugia, on texts by Paul Faure. Bosmans was Benjamin Britten and Peter Pears's good friend, and they called her "Jetty"; in March 1942, Pears writes to Britten:

She is feeling happy now, because some songs she wrote for Noémie Pérugia had a great success 10 days ago, it appears. – Peter Pears.

In 1951 the composer Maurice Thiriet dedicated to Pérugia Fleurs (Flowers), 6 poems which he put in music according to the texts of Blanche Pierre-Biez. Noémie Pérugia sang them for the first time on May 24, 1951, accompanied on the piano by Jean-Yves Daniel-Lesur.

On November 28, 1953 she sang for the first time on a French Radio two songs by Charles Koechlin, from Opera 68: Deux mélodies for Soprano, Hymne à Vénus (Villiers de l'Isle-Adam) and Dissolution (Paul Claudel, from La connaissance de l'est).

== Death ==
Noémie Pérugia died on 25 March, 1992, at Franeker, Netherlands.
