= Sim Gokkes =

Dutch-Jewish composer

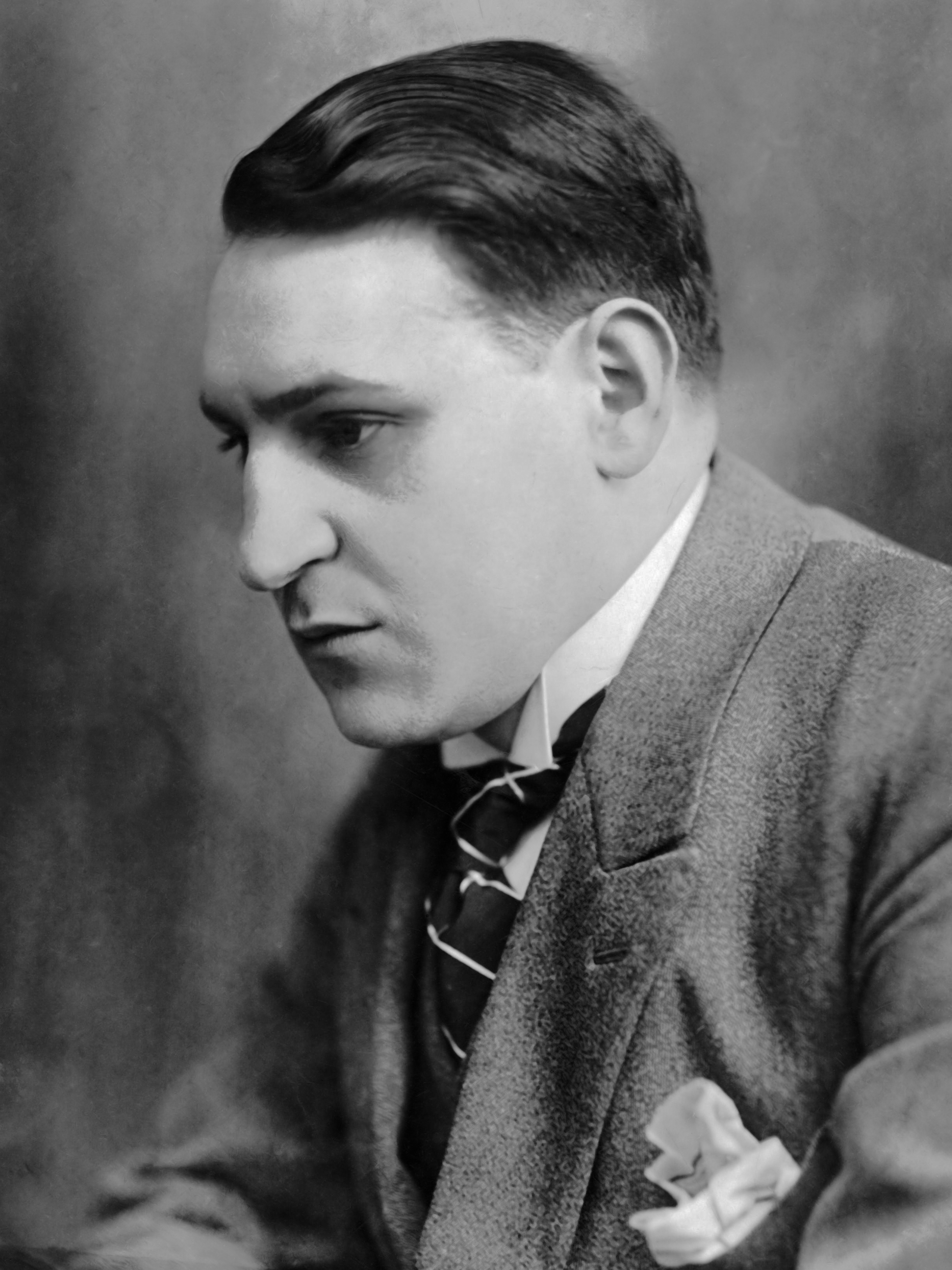
Sim Gokkes (1928)

Simon (Sim) Gokkes (21 March 1897 in Amsterdam – 5 February 1943 in Auschwitz) was a Dutch-Jewish composer.

Gokkes was born in Amsterdam, the son of David Gokkes and Rachel Remini. As a child, he took his first singing lessons with Ben Geysel, an opera singer who ran the Rembrandt Theatre of Amsterdam. Gokkes was also a pupil of Victor Schlesinger, cantor of the Rapenburg Synagogue in Amsterdam. In 1912, Gokkes wrote his first compositions, "Ngolinu Leshabiag" and "Yigdal". He studied composition with Sem Dresden and also piano and flute at the Conservatorium van Amsterdam, finishing in 1919. He then worked as an assistant director of the Netherlands Opera.

Throughout his life, Gokkes directed several choirs. In 1921, he founded the School Choir of Amsterdam. For years he was director of the Santo Serviçio, the choir of the Portuguese Synagogue in Amsterdam. Gokkes is known as an innovator of synagogue music. His compositions relate primarily to religious themes.

In 1923, Gokkes married pianist Rebecca Winnik. Along with his wife and his two children, David and Rachel, he was murdered in Auschwitz concentration camp on 5 February 1943.

Only some of his works are preserved in the Netherlands Music Institute.

== Works preserved at the Netherlands Music Institute ==
- Le pèlerin de Jérusalem, Amsterdam, May 1928, lyrics by Jacob Israël de Haan, for voice and piano
- Kaddisch, Amsterdam, June 1928, for voice and piano
- C’en est fait, June 1928, lyrics by Ernest Bussy, for voice and piano
- Kermesse d’été, Amsterdam, May 1928, lyrics by Willem de Mérode, for voice and piano
- Duiven, Amsterdam, May 1928, lyrics by François Pauwels
- La lune blanche luit dans les bois, Amsterdam, June 1928, lyrics by Paul Verlaine, for voice and piano
- Trois Lieder hébreux, Amsterdam, 1926, lyrics by Jehuda-ben Samuel Hallevi, for voice and piano
- Kaddisch, Amsterdam, June 1928, for voice and piano
- Kinah, Amsterdam, April 1928, Lamentations of Jeremiah, Chapter I, Verses 1–8, for solo voices, wind quintet and piano
- Sonatine, June 1939, for piano

== Other works ==
- Exodus, 1931, for mixed chorus and orchestra
