= Tom Gaebel =

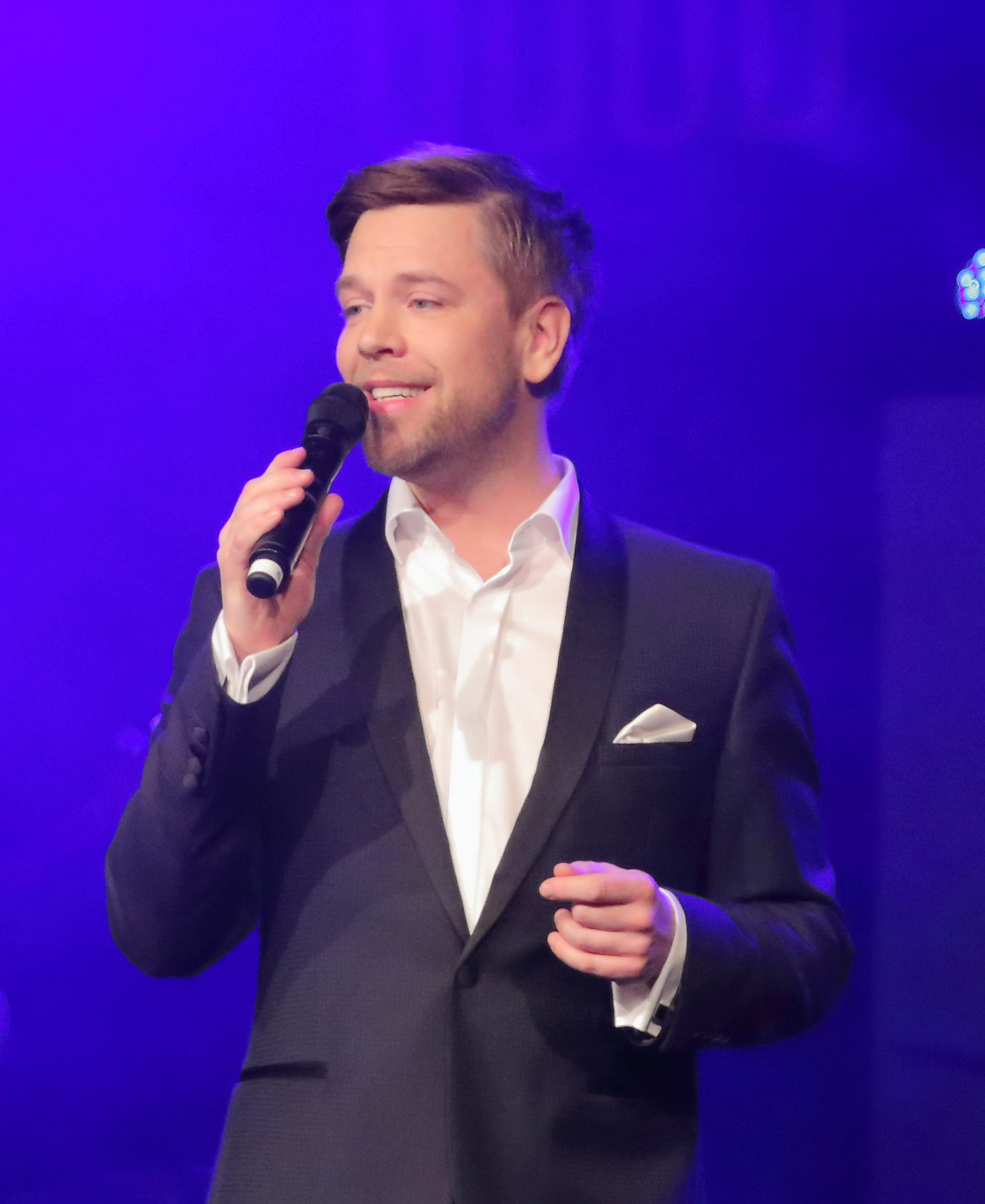

Background information
- Born: 13 January 1975 (age 51); Gelsenkirchen, North Rhine-Westphalia, West Germany
- Genres: Traditional pop, vocal, jazz
- Occupations: Singer, composer
- Instrument: Vocals
- Label: Edel
- Website: www.tomgaebel.de (in German and English)

Tom Gaebel is a German singer and leader of a big band named after himself. He changed the spelling of his last name, omitting the umlaut. In addition to singing and arranging, Gaebel writes lyrics in English.

Gaebel was born on 13 January 1975 in Gelsenkirchen, North Rhine-Westphalia, West Germany, into a musical family. His younger brother Denis Gäbel plays tenor saxophone in the Tom Gaebel big band. Colin Gäbel is a singer and guitarist in addition to being a TV presenter and reporter about computer games; he is a member of the rock band Mondo Kane. Gaebel started music lessons at an early age. He plays several instruments, including drums, violin, trombone, and piano. During high school, he was a member of bands, including two big bands and a rock band called Goresaw. He attended the Conservatorium van Amsterdam. In October 2004, he received a major in jazz singing from the Conservatorium. After performing and singing in big bands, such as The Young Sinatras and the Tobias Kremer Big Band, he formed his own group in 2005.

His debut solo album, Introducing: Myself, was released in 2005 and became a best seller. A live DVD, Live in Concert, followed in 2006. His second album, Good Life from 2007, featured more of Gaebel's original numbers. Don't Wanna Dance spotlighted Gaebel expanding his style to pop and soul, with songs influenced by Motown. In 2010, he released two new albums. Music to Watch Girls By focused on the style of late 1960s easy listening ballads and uptempo numbers, and a Christmas album, Easy Christmas, which includes songs for the season written by Gaebel. In June 2010, Gaebel and his big band performed at the Sommerfest for the Federal President Christian Wulff held at Castle Bellevue in Berlin.

== Awards ==
- 2006 – JAZZ award
- 2007 – JAZZ award

== Discography ==
- 2003: The Unknown – The Young Sinatras
- 2003: Sinatra – Tobias Kremer Big Band featuring Tom Gaebel
- 2003: The Day That Lies Ahead
- 2004: SWING! – Tom Gaebel & the Tobias Kremer Big Band
- 2005: Introducing: Myself
- 2007: Good Life
- 2008 Single: "Highway to Hell" – Jazzkantine featuring Tom Gaebel
- 2008 Single: "So Easy" from Don't Wanna Dance
- 2008: Don't Wanna Dance
- 2010: Music to Watch Girls By
- 2010: Easy Christmas
- 2014: So Good to Be Me
- 2015: A Swinging Christmas
- 2018: Perfect Day
- 2020: The Best of Tom Gaebel
- 2022: Live At The Savoy
- 2023: A Christmas To Remember

== DVDs ==
- 2006: Tom Gaebel & his Big Band – Live in Concert
