= Valerie Tryon =

English classical pianist

Valerie Tryon (born 5 September 1934) is an English classical pianist. Since 1971 she has resided in Canada, but continues to pursue an international performing and recording career, and spends a part of each year in her native Britain. Among her specialisms is the music of Franz Liszt, of which she has made a number of celebrated recordings. Currently an artist-in-residence at McMaster University in Hamilton, Ontario, Tryon is active as a concerto soloist, recitalist, chamber musician, accompanist and adjudicator.

== Early life ==
Born in Portsmouth, England, Valerie Tryon was performing regularly in public while still a child. She toured with the Northern Youth Orchestra of Great Britain at the age of nine, and had broadcast for the BBC before she was 12. Having received the ARCM and LRAM diplomas in 1948, she then became one of the youngest students ever to be admitted to the Royal Academy of Music, where from 1950 to 1955 she studied with Eric Grant. She made her London début in 1953.

While a student, Tryon received the RAM's highest award in piano playing; she also won the coveted Boise Scholarship, which enabled her to study with Jacques Février in Paris (1955–56). In 1956 she was a prize winner at the Liszt Competition in Budapest. A recital at the 1959 Cheltenham Festival was acclaimed by some of the UK's foremost critics, and helped launch her adult concert career.

== Career ==
Since 1959, Tryon has appeared as soloist and recitalist in major British concert halls and in Europe, South Africa, Canada, and the United States. She has performed piano concertos with the Hallé Orchestra, Royal Philharmonic, London Philharmonic, London Symphony Orchestra, Toronto Symphony Orchestra, and other major orchestras. The list of conductors with whom she has worked includes Sir Colin Davis, Sir Adrian Boult, Charles Dutoit, Pierre Monteux and Simon Streatfeild.

As a soloist, Tryon is especially noted for her performances of the works of Chopin, Liszt and Rachmaninoff.

In 1976, Tryon became Associate Professor of Music at McMaster University; in 1980, the post of Artist-in-Residence at McMaster was created for her. Within North America, Tryon has appeared in such cities as Toronto, Montreal, Boston, Washington, Pittsburgh, Minneapolis, San Francisco, and Los Angeles. She became a naturalised Canadian citizen in 1986.

Tryon was among the first concert and recording artists of the front rank to recognise the significance of the new music technologies and the internet, and is unique in having created a large number of MIDI sequences for web-based distribution. To prepare her 'live' sequences she uses a Roland FP8-88 weighted MIDI keyboard controller with 'real time' recording techniques; as of 2009 her recordings in this medium number almost 900, most of them produced in collaboration with PG Music, Inc. In 1993 she released with PG the computer-based learning program "Pianist" with 215 MIDI-Sequences of classical pieces. On the PC-screen you could see a piano keyboard and the notes she played when recording each piece.

One of Tryon's chief enthusiasms is chamber music. Two of her best-known duo partners in England were Alfredo Campoli (violin) and George Isaac (cello), with both of whom she made a number of significant recordings. In 1981, she entered into a duo partnership with cellist Coenraad Bloemendal that resulted in six recordings on the Dorian label from 1989 to 1994. Her 1971 performance with Isaac of Rachmaninov's Cello Sonata is now considered to be a collector's item. In 1986 she was a co-founder (with Gerard Kantarjian) of the Rembrandt Trio, and frequently appears with Camerata and Trio Canada.

== Repertoire ==
Tryon's repertoire is large, ranging from Bach and Scarlatti to contemporary composers; it also includes more than sixty concertos and a significant amount of chamber music. Among modern British composers, both Alun Hoddinott and John McCabe have dedicated works to her, and she has been active in promoting such Canadian composers as Srul Irving Glick, Murray Adaskin, Milton Barnes and Claude Champagne.

She is well known for her interpretations of the romantics; when the BBC launched its Radio Enterprises record label, some years ago, Tryon's performance of Rachmaninov's 'Etudes Tableaux', op. 39, was the first classical disc to be released.

More recently she has recorded the complete Ballades and Scherzos of Chopin for the CBC's "Musica Viva" label, a disc which Harold Schonberg of the New York Times described as "the best Chopin recording of the past decade."

Tryon now broadcasts frequently for the BBC as well as for Canadian and American broadcasting networks. Her solo performances and appearances with the Rembrandt Trio have been recorded on the Omnibus, Pye, Argo, Lyrita, Educo and CBC labels. Currently, Tryon is involved with several other world-class pianists in recording the complete works of Franz Liszt for Naxos.

In early 2009, Tryon was in London to record an all-Mozart disc with the LSO (for release on the APR label). The works recorded were the Piano Concerto in C minor, K.491 (cadenza by Godowsky), Piano Concerto in C major, K.503 (cadenza by Hummel), and the Concert Rondo in A major, K.386.

== Honours and awards ==
Tryon was an early recipient of the Harriet Cohen Medal. In 1986 the Hungarian Minister of Culture awarded her the Ferenc Liszt Medal of Honour for "outstanding achievement" in the interpretation of Liszt's music. In 1987 she was elected a Fellow of the Royal Academy of Music, and in 1991 was granted an Honorary Licentiate Diploma (LWCM) from the Western Ontario Conservatory of Music (now Conservatory Canada).

Tryon's recording Debussy Songs, performed with soprano Claudette LeBlanc, won a Canadian Juno Award for "best classical album" in 1994. Her album "The Joy of Piano" brought a second Juno nomination in the same category the following year.

An honorary D. LITT was granted to Tryon in 2000 by McMaster University.

She was appointed a Member of the Order of Canada (CM) per the Government House Announcement of 29 December 2017 (Canada Gazette of 6 January 2018) "for her internationally celebrated career as a pianist and for her contributions as an educator and builder of classical music culture".

== Partial list of recordings ==
No complete listing of Tryon's recordings currently exists. In the early stages of her career she made a number of records for Saga, Lyrita and Educo, but full details of these remain to be compiled.

Solo recordings:

- Hoddinott: Piano Works - Piano Sonata No. 1, Op. 17; Nocturne No. 2, Op. 16, No. 1; Piano Sonata No. 2, Op. 27; Nocturne No. 1, Op. 9; Elegy Op. 18, No. 3 (Lyrita REAM.2108; 1965)
- 'Valerie Tryon Plays Rachmaninov' (BBC REB-27/BBC RMC-4035 (cass); 1971)
- 'These You Have Loved: Romantic Piano Music' - including Chopin, Schumann, Liszt (BBC REC-112/BBC MRMC-015 (cass); 1975)
- 'Valerie Tryon Piano: In Public Concert': Chopin - Mozart - Liszt. 1978. CBC Musica Viva MV-1—1
- Liszt - Chopin et al. (Educo 3148; 1980)
- 'A Liszt Recital' - including Six ‘Paganini’ Studies, Gnomenreigen, Waldesrauschen (Educo 3086; 1980)
- 'The Joy of the Piano': including Balakirev: 'Islamey'; Ravel: 'Alborada del gracioso'; Chaminade: 'Automne' (CBC Records MVCD 1065; 1993)
- Chopin: Complete Scherzos and Ballades (CBC Records Musica Viva MVCD 1092; 1996)
- Liszt: Complete Piano Music Vol.11 - transcriptions of Mozart, Eduard Lassen, Robert Franz, Otto Lessman and Josef Dessauer (NAXOS 8.553508; 1998)
- 'Ferrucio Busoni: Visionary' - including Bach-Busoni Chaconne, Bizet-Busoni 'Carmen Fantasy', Indianisches Tagebuch (CBC Records MVCD 1126; 1999)
- Ignaz Friedman Vol.1 - including Passacaglia, op. 44; Studies on a Theme of Paganini, op. 47b; Concert Paraphrase on J. Strauss' 'Frühlingsstimmen' (Appian APR 5592; 2000)
- Liszt Complete Piano Music Vol.14 - Transcriptions of Ferdinand David's 'Bunte Reihe' (Naxos 8.553507; 2000)
- Scarlatti: Keyboard Sonatas K.1, 9, 11, 17, 19, 20, 25, 27, 29, 30, 33, 96, 147, 159, 201, 377, 427, 430, 525 & Sonata in F (attrib.) (Appian APR 5591; 2000)
- Liszt Complete Piano Music Vol.17 - Schubert song transcriptions including Müller Lieder and Erlkönig (Naxos 8.554729; 2001)
- Ravel: Piano Music, Vol.1 (Appian APR 5593; 2001)
- 'A Liszt Odyssey' - including 'Am stillen Herd', 'Liebestod' from 'Tristan' (Wagner-Liszt), Faust Waltz (Gounod-Liszt), Funérailles, Concert Studies, Hungarian Rhapsodies, and Liszt's Buch der Lieder, vols. 1 and 2 (2 CDs; Appian APR 7039; 2004)
- Ravel: Piano Music, Vol.2 (Appian APR 5594; 2005)
- 'Valerie Tryon Plays Mendelssohn'- including Andante and Rondo Capriccioso, Op.14; Songs Without Words nos 1–3, 18, 25, 30, 34 & 37; Variations, Op.82; Three Fantasies or Caprices, Op.16; Variations, Op.83; Variations Serieuses, Op.54 (Appian APR 5595; 2005)
- 'Chopin: A Chronological Journey' - 46 works, including Andante spianato and Grand Polonaise, op. 22; Fantasie in F minor, op. 49; Sonata no. 2, in B-flat minor, op. 35; Sonata no 3, in B minor, op. 58; Barcarolle, op. 60; Nocturnes, Waltzes, and Mazurkas. (3CDs; APR 7301; 2007)

Chamber music and songs:

- Liszt: Violin Sonata ('Duo Sonata', G127); Strauss: Violin Sonata in E flat, Op. 18 (Alfredo Campoli, violin; Valerie Tryon, piano; Pye Virtuoso 0 TPLS13017; 1968)
- Rachmaninov: Cello Sonata in D minor, Op. 19; Hoddinott: Cello Sonata; Banks: Sequence for solo cello (George Isaac, cello; Valerie Tryon, piano; Argo ZRG-695; 1971)
- Hoddinott: Roman Dream; Piano Trio; Tate: Apparitions; Three Gaelic Ballads (Margaret Price, soprano; Gerald English, tenor; James Lockhart, piano; Douglas Tate, harmonica; Valerie Tryon, piano; Cardiff Festival Players dir. James Lockhart; Argo ZRG69; 1972)
- Mendelssohn: Trio for Piano and Strings no 1 in D minor, Op. 49; Schubert: Trio for Piano and Strings no 1 in B flat major, D 898/Op. 99 (Rembrandt Trio; Dorian Recordings; DOR-90130; 1986)
- Brahms: Trio for Piano and Strings no 1 in B major, Op. 8; Antonín Dvořák: Trio for Piano and Strings no 4 in E minor, Op. 90/B 166 (Rembrandt Trio; Dorian Recordings; 1988)
- Ravel: Trio for Piano, Violin and Cello in A minor; Saint-Saëns: Trio for Piano, Violin and Cello no 1 in F major, Op. 18; Chaminade: Trio for Piano, Violin and Cello no 1 in G minor, Op. 11 (Rembrandt Trio; Dorian Recordings; 1989)
- Tchaikovsky: Piano trio in A minor, op. 50; Arensky: Piano trio no. 1 in D minor, op. 32 (Rembrandt Trio; Dorian Recordings; 1991)
- 'Salon Classics' - including works by Kreisler, Debussy, Suk, Dvořák, Herbert, Schumann, Liszt, Brahms, Chabrier, Grieg, Godard and Saint-Saëns (Rembrandt Trio; Dorian Recordings; 1991)
- Debussy: Songs (w. Claudette LeBlanc, soprano; Unicorn-Kanchana Records; DKP CD 9133; 1992)
- 'Dances and Romances for Violin' - including works by Adaskin, Barnes, Bach, De Falla, Kreisler, Paganini (William Beauvais, Valerie Tryon, Moshe Hammer; CBC Records MVCD 1071; 2001)
- 'The Cantorial Voice of the Cello' - (Dorian 90208, 1994)

== Footnotes ==
=== References ===
- Entry: 'Tryon, Valerie', in the Naxos 'A to Z of Pianists', pp. 790–792 (Naxos Educational, Hong Kong, 2007)
- Jacques Lesier: Artists' Management, The Del Prado, San Diego, CA
- Howard Greenwood: Concert Management, London, UK
- Hammond, Antony: 'McMaster appoints first artist-in-residence', Hamilton Spectator, 19 January 1980
- Fraser, Hugh: 'Reflections on a piano,' Hamilton Spectator, 3 October 1989
- Duff, Michael: 'The world at her fingertips', Stoney Creek News, 25 October 1989
- Fraser, Hugh: 'Modest Tryon can't explain her popularity', Hamilton Spectator, 29 July 1996
- 'World-class Tryon to play at Mac', Hamilton Spectator, 14 March 2001
- Order of Canada (CM): Canada Gazette of 6 January 2018
