= Coenraad Bloemendal =

Dutch-born Canadian cellist

- Born: April 30, 1946 (age 80); Amsterdam, Netherlands
- Genres: Classical
- Occupations: Cellist, pedagogue
- Instrument: Cello
- Years active: fl. ca. 1963 -present
- Labels: Sony, CBC

Coenraad Bloemendal (born April 30, 1946, in Amsterdam) is a Dutch-born Canadian cellist, who has performed, taught and recorded primarily in the field of classical music during a career that has spanned more than four decades.

== Formal training ==
In the min-1960s Bloemendal studied at the Amsterdam Conservatory with the Netherlands' leading cello pedagogue Carel van Leeuwen Boomkamp (also the teacher of Anner Bijlsma). After graduation he moved to Bloomington Indiana in the United States to study cello with Janos Starker and chamber music with William Primrose.

== Early career ==
Still in his teens, Bloemendal started touring with a professional chamber ensemble in the Netherlands and Germany. At 19, he joined a group of cellists from the Concertgebouw Orchestra of Amsterdam for a tour of the Netherlands and Belgium. In 1971 Bloemendal moved to Canada and joined Camerata (chamber ensemble), which consisted of the classically trained musicians: Elyakim Taussig and Kathryn Root (pianists), Suzanne Shulman (flute), James Campbell (clarinet), and Adele Armin (violin). On occasion, they were joined by Mary Lou Fallis (soprano). They were joined by well-known artists from various disciplines, including Maureen Forrester, Moe Koffman, Don Thompson and Doug Riley, Glenn Gould, The National Ballet of Canada, and actor Tony Van Bridge. Camerata Canada accompanied Prime Minister Pierre Trudeau to inaugurate cultural relations with Mexico, Venezuela and Cuba, and performed at the Prime Minister's residence. In the late seventies Camerata embarked on several European tours. The group disbanded in 1982.

== Work with Glenn Gould ==
Bloemendal first worked with internationally known pianist Glenn Gould in two CBC Television programs called Music in Our Time which Gould directed in the mid-1970s. He then worked with the late pianist on two other occasions: a cello solo which Gould wrote for him to play in his radio program "The Quiet in the Land" and a cello and bass piece which he played with Joel Quarrington as part of a film score Gould wrote for the Canadian movie "The Wars" directed by Robin Phillips shortly before he died.

== Later career ==
Bloemendal's career continued during the 1980s, and he performed with other chamber groups, including The Toronto Chamber Players, The Toronto Septet, The Canadian Chamber Ensemble, and The Amati Quartet. In 1986, he founded another group, The Rembrandt Trio, with Valerie Tryon (piano) and Gerard Kantarjian (violin). They toured Canada, the U.S. and the Caribbean and made five recordings for the American label Dorian Recordings. The group disbanded in 1997.

As a recitalist, Bloemendal played for 25 years with pianist Valerie Tryon. He also has a long association with jazz musician Don Thompson, who has written many compositions for him for recordings and concerts.

Bloemendal contributed cello passages to Diana Panton's 2016 album Hello to Childhood II, and to her album I Believe in Little Things, which won a Juno Award for Children's Album of the Year in 2017.

== Teaching career ==
Bloemendal taught at the Royal Conservatory of Music from 1982 to 2000. He was the head of the string department at York University from 1980 to 1984, and he taught cellist Ofra Harnoy when she was 10 years old.

== Current activities ==
In May 2010, Bloemendal founded a new ensemble called Trio Desiree with Desiree Till (soprano), and Erica Goodman, (harp). The group has played in Summer Festivals in Ontario and Quebec and three Canadian Composers have written new works for the combo. The trio started a recording label in 2013 called ERDECO Recordings and have recorded one CD 'Couleurs'.

== Discography ==
=== With Camerata ===
- CBC Records LP SM 278 – works by Beethoven, Martinů and Mozart (1976)
- CBC Records LP SM 313 – works by Schoenberg, Strauss and Berg (1976)
- Crystal Records LP S642 – works by Saint-Saëns, Fanny Mendelssohn (1978)
- Golden Crest Records LP CRS 4194 – with Paul Brodie (saxophone) – works by Ben McPeek, Harry Freedman and others (1980)

=== With Joel Quarrington ===
- Crystal Records LP S 135 – Duos for Cello and Bass – Rossini, Offenbach, Massenet (1982)

=== With Roxolana Roslak ===
- Centrediscs LP WRC1 2895 – Duos for Cello and Soprano – Harry Somers, Vilolet Archer, Jean Coulthard (1983)

=== With Glenn Gould ===
- Sony Records SM2K 52664 – Schoenberg, Pierrot Lunaire op.21 (1974, 1994)
- Sony SK 52679 – Poulenc, Aubade (1975, 1997)

=== With The Rembrandt Trio ===
- Dorian Recordings, DOR-90130 – Trios by Mendelssohn and Schubert (1990)
- Dorian Recordings DOR-90146 – Trios by Tchaikovsky and Arensky (1991)
- Dorian Recordings DOR-90160 – Trios by Brahms and Dvořák (1992)
- Dorian Recordings DOR-90187 – Trios by Chaminade, Saint-Saëns and Ravel (1993)
- Dorian Recordings DOR-90222 – Salon Classics (1995)

=== With Trio Désirée ===
- CD 001 – Désirée Till 'Couleurs': soprano, cello and harp (Trio Désirée), with Erica Goodman (2013) https://open.spotify.com/album/0hKNcV6csGGhKIhcZ56RIp

=== Solo recordings ===
- Dorian Recordings DOR-90208 – The Cantorial Voice of the Cello, with Valerie Tryon (piano) (1995)
- Marquis Records 81373 – Reflections Romantic: Duets for Cello and Harp, with Erica Goodman (2007)
- Crystal Records CD 135 – CD reissue of Duos for Cello and Bass with a new work by Don Thompson (2009)
- Erdeco Recordings CD 002 – Caprice: 12 caprices and études, with Sybil Shanahan (2014)
