= Sarah Bosmans-Benedicts =

Sara Bosmans-Benedicts (23 October 1861 – 12 November 1949) was a Dutch pianist and piano pedagogue.

Benedicts was born in Amsterdam, the daughter of Benedictus Benedicts and Hanna de Goede. Her parents were Jewish; her father was a violinist and violin teacher. She studied piano with James Kwast. In 1886, Benedicts married fellow Dutch musician Henri Bosmans (1856-1896), principal cellist of the Royal Concertgebouw Orchestra. Their daughter, composer Henriëtte Bosmans, was born in 1895, six months before Bosmans died.

Widowed in her thirties, with a young child to raise, Sarah Benedicts taught at the Conservatoire of Amsterdam. Among her pupils were Jaap Spaanderman and her own daughter. During World War II, her sister Esther was killed at Auschwitz, and her nephew was killed with his wife and daughter at Sobibor. Benedicts, in her eighties, was arrested and deported by the Nazi occupation in 1944, but her daughter and others intervened to prevent her further detention. She lived out the war in Amsterdam with her daughter.

Sara Bosmans-Benedicts died in 1949, and her grave is in Zorgvlied Cemetery in Amsterdam.

== Sources ==
- Entry in the Jewish Biographical Dictionary Database (Dutch)
