= Theo Bruins =

Dutch pianist and composer (1929–1993)

- Born: November 25, 1929, Arnhem, Netherlands
- Died: January 8, 1993, Haarlem, Netherlands
- Occupations: Pianist, composer

Theo Bruins (25 November 1929, in Arnhem – 8 January 1993, in Haarlem) was a Dutch pianist and composer.

== Life and career ==
Bruins' earliest piano lessons were with his mother. His professional piano studies commenced in 1946 with Jaap Spaanderman at the Conservatoire of the Amsterdam Muzieklyceum Foundation (merged into the Amsterdam Conservatoire). Starting in 1948 he studied with Yves Nat and from 1951 studied composition with Kees van Baaren.

In the meanwhile he had started a successful career as a performing concert pianist, which took him to North America and South America, and throughout Europe, as well as to Indonesia. Amongst others he played as a soloist with the Concertgebouw Orchestra. For a recital in London he received the Beethoven Medal of the Harriet Cohen International Music Award in 1959. He taught at the Royal Conservatory of The Hague. Among his students are Bart Berman, Maarten Bon, Loek van der Leeden, and Fred Oldenburg.

Bruins' compositions are few in number, but nevertheless well noted. All his works were published by Donemus and collected on one album by the Q Disc label. His Syncope for harpsichord (1992) appears also on a collection by NM Music.

== Complete list of works ==
- Six pièces brèves (1950)
- Concerto per pianoforte ed orchestra (1952)
- Sonate per pianoforte (1955)
- Sei Studi (1963)
- Quartet '84 for piano solo (1984)
- Tremani for two pianos (1991/1992)
- Syncope for harpsichord (1992)

== Biography ==
- Emanuel Overbeeke: "Moeizame componeerarbeid" [Difficult Composition Labor]. Mens en Melodie, February 1997.
