= Signe Tollefsen =

American-Dutch musician

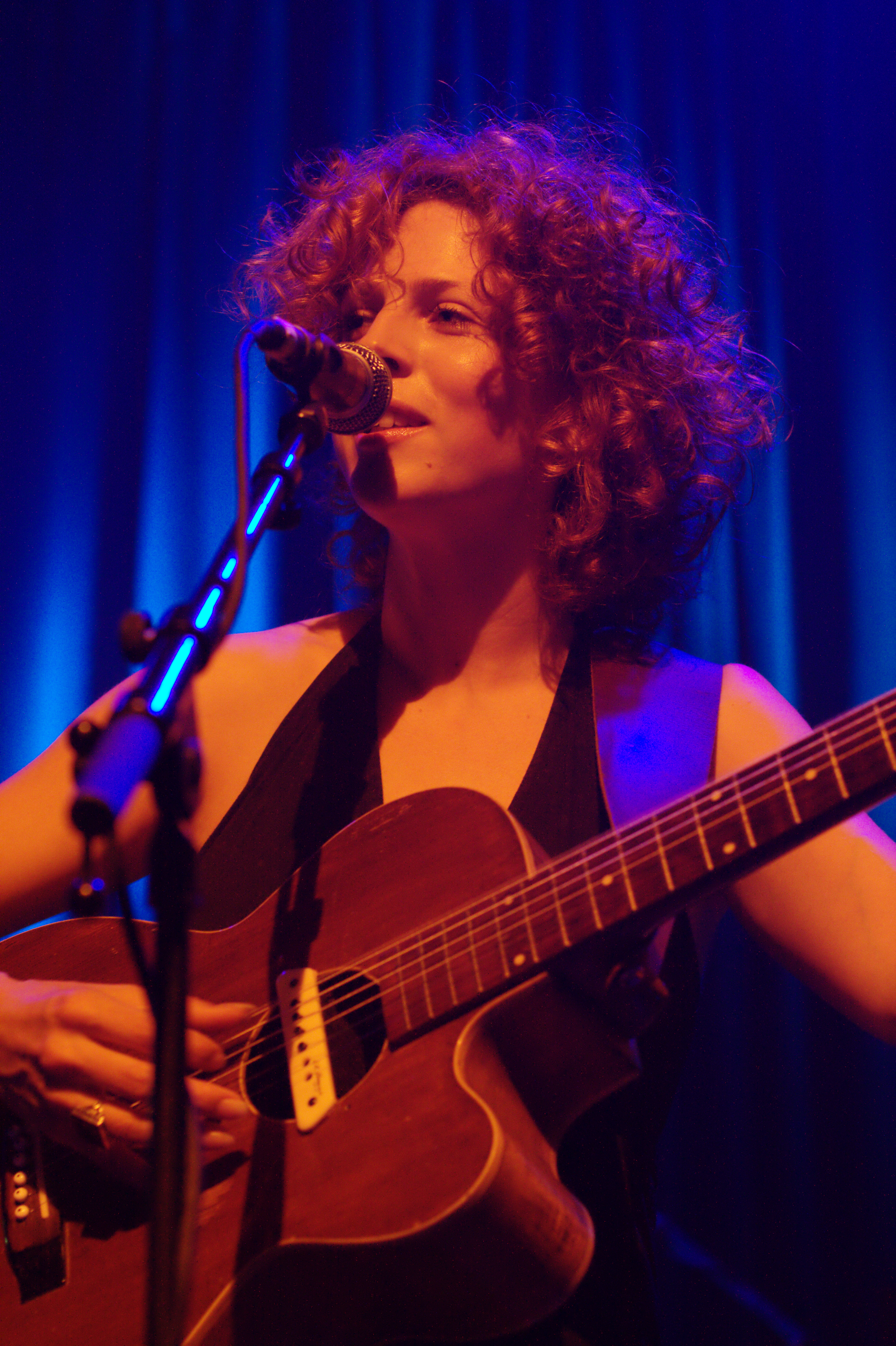

Background information
- Born: 1981 (age 44–45)
- Origin: Amsterdam, Netherlands
- Genres: Folk rock
- Occupation: Musician
- Instruments: Vocals, guitar, piano, banjo
- Years active: 2000–present
- Label: Cavalier Records / V2
- Members: Signe Tollefsen, Ralph Timmermans, Jeroen Coudron, Johan Reijnders, Johan Volman

Signe Tollefsen /ˈsɪɡnə ˈtɒləfsən/ is an American–Dutch singer-songwriter, settled in Amsterdam, Netherlands. Her music has been described as folk rock.

== Biography ==
Growing up in Utrecht, the Netherlands, as the child of an American father and a Dutch mother, Signe Tollefsen started to sing at the age of 7. She went to the "Kathedrale Koorschool Utrecht", the choir school in Utrecht (other members were Colin Benders, better known as Kyteman). She composed her first songs on guitar at the age of 14, inspired by artists such as Janis Joplin, Edith Piaf, and Paul Simon. At 15, she moved to the UK to finish high school (European School, Culham) and studied classical singing at the Royal Northern College of Music. She eventually gave up classical song for studies in philosophy at the University of Hull, when she started singing her own songs in public at Hull's infamous underground club "The Adelphi". She moved back to the Netherlands to study medicine, but gave up and started studying at the Amsterdam Conservatory with René van Barneveld ('Tres Manos', the Urban Dance Squad). In 2005, she played with Stephen Malkmus ('S.M.', Pavement) in Italy and Germany.

In December 2006 she won the audience prize and the prize for best musician at the Grolsch Grote Prijs van Nederland in the category singer-songwriter, thus qualifying to record a promotion single and to appear on well-known stages. Her picture appeared on the front page of the newspaper "Sp!ts".

Between 2006 and 2009, she shared the stage with Ane Brun, Stephen Malkmus, Alela Diane, Luka Bloom, and Japan's singer David Sylvian.

In 2008 famous Dutch singer Mathilde Santing recorded her song "Sweet Tears" on her album Forty-Nine.

In September 2009 Tollefsen's eponymous debut album came out on CoraZong Records, recorded in Los Angeles (USA) and Utrecht (NL). It was very well-received by the press and was later released in Belgium, Luxembourg, Germany and the UK.

In 2010 she toured the UK twice (April and November) and the USA and Canada (September).

Her EP, entitled Baggage came out in January 2011 and was produced by Ralph Timmermans. This album contained 6 covers and was published by Cavalier Records and V2.

In March 2011 she was a guest musician in De Wereld Draait Door, a popular Dutch TV show with an average of 1.5 million viewers, singing "Borrowed Song", which will appear on her second album.

Her second album Hayes, also produced by Ralph Timmermans, came out in September 2011, and is said to be a transitional album, where Tollefsen switches from acoustic guitar to electric. Timmermans co-wrote "Daddy", "Scared" and "Here Is What". "Where You Been" was recorded in Los Angeles by Brian Adler, "Speak To Me" and "Since I'm Leaving" were recorded in Sweden by Tollefsen herself in June 2011, where she spent a month writing. Two more songs she wrote there will be recorded for her next album.

== Reviews ==
thisull
Quite simply put Signe has the most amazing voice. Her vocal range has to be heard to be believed, the controlled and measured delivery marvelled at, the maturity and richness of tone surprising in one so young. [...] Her voice hypnotic, her guitar style minimalist, almost ponderous as she falls into full-bodied deep sounds or pin-prick sharp notes.

== Discography ==
- Signe Tollefsen – September 2009

1. It Smells of You
2. History Class
3. You, Me & The Brewers
4. Jeff
5. Hooked (You Spit in My Whiskey)
6. King of the Fire
7. Mama
8. My Old Man
9. Sweet Tears
10. Up To No Good
11. It Was Ooo
12. Oh My!
13. This Is It

- Baggage – January 2011

1. You Are My Sunshine (Jimmy Davis)
2. No Thank You (The Woodwards)
3. Glory Box (Portishead)
4. Dirty Diana (Michael Jackson)
5. Down by the Water (PJ Harvey)
6. As The World Falls Down (David Bowie)

- Hayes – September 2011

1. 185 MPH
2. Drunk Orchestra
3. Speak To Me
4. Since I'm Leaving
5. Daddy
6. Where You Been
7. Make Me A (Wo)man
8. Homecoming
9. Borrowed Song
10. Here Is What
11. Scared

== See also ==
- Music of the Netherlands
