= Aafje Heynis =

Dutch singer

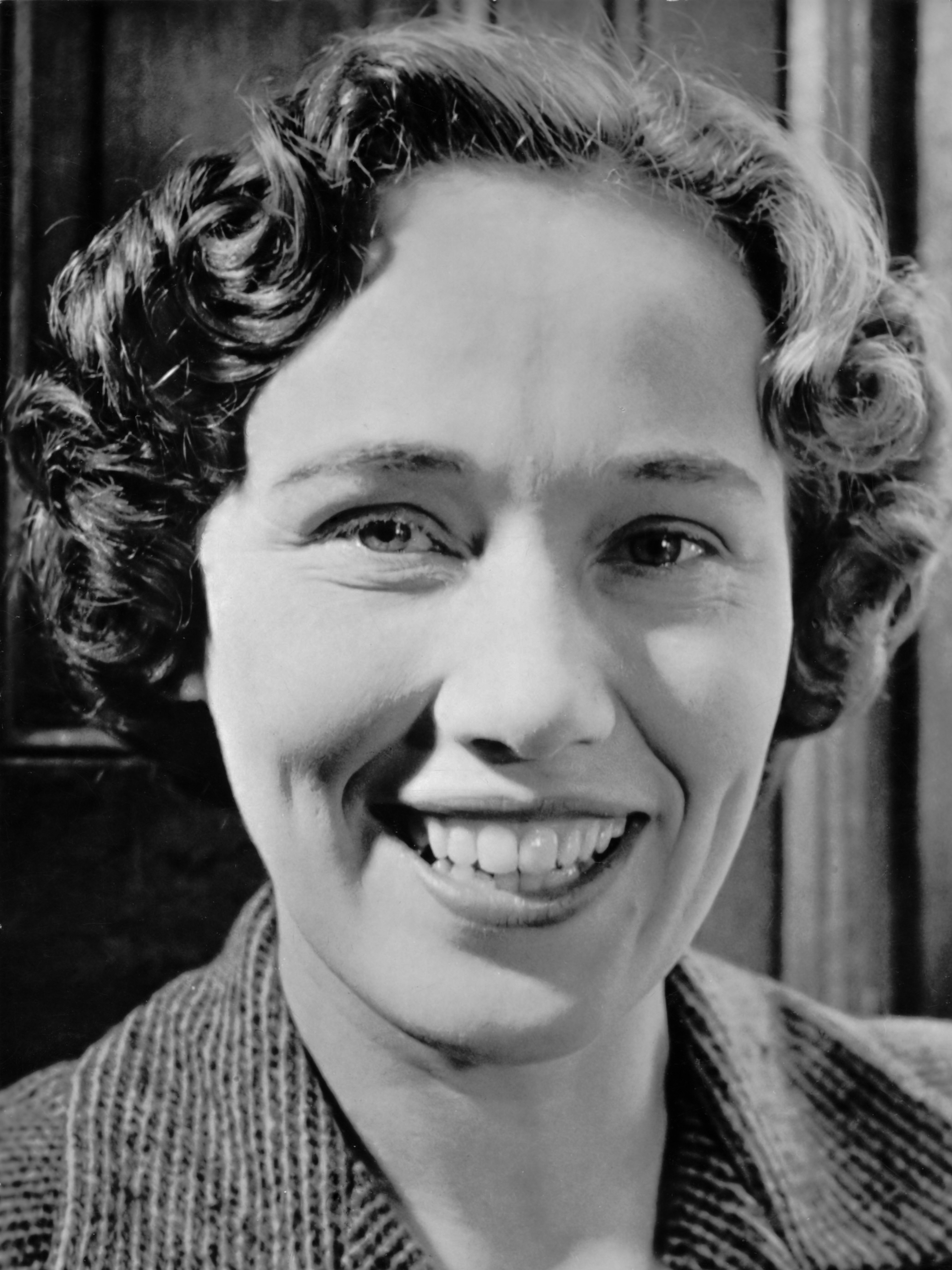
- Heynis in 1960

Background information
- Born: 2 May 1924
- Died: 16 December 2015 (aged 91)
- Occupations: Contralto

Aafje Heynis (2 May 1924 – 16 December 2015) was a Dutch contralto. In 1961, she was awarded the Harriet Cohen International Music Award. A tea rose, hybridised by Buisman 1964, was named after her. She died on 16 December 2015, aged 91.

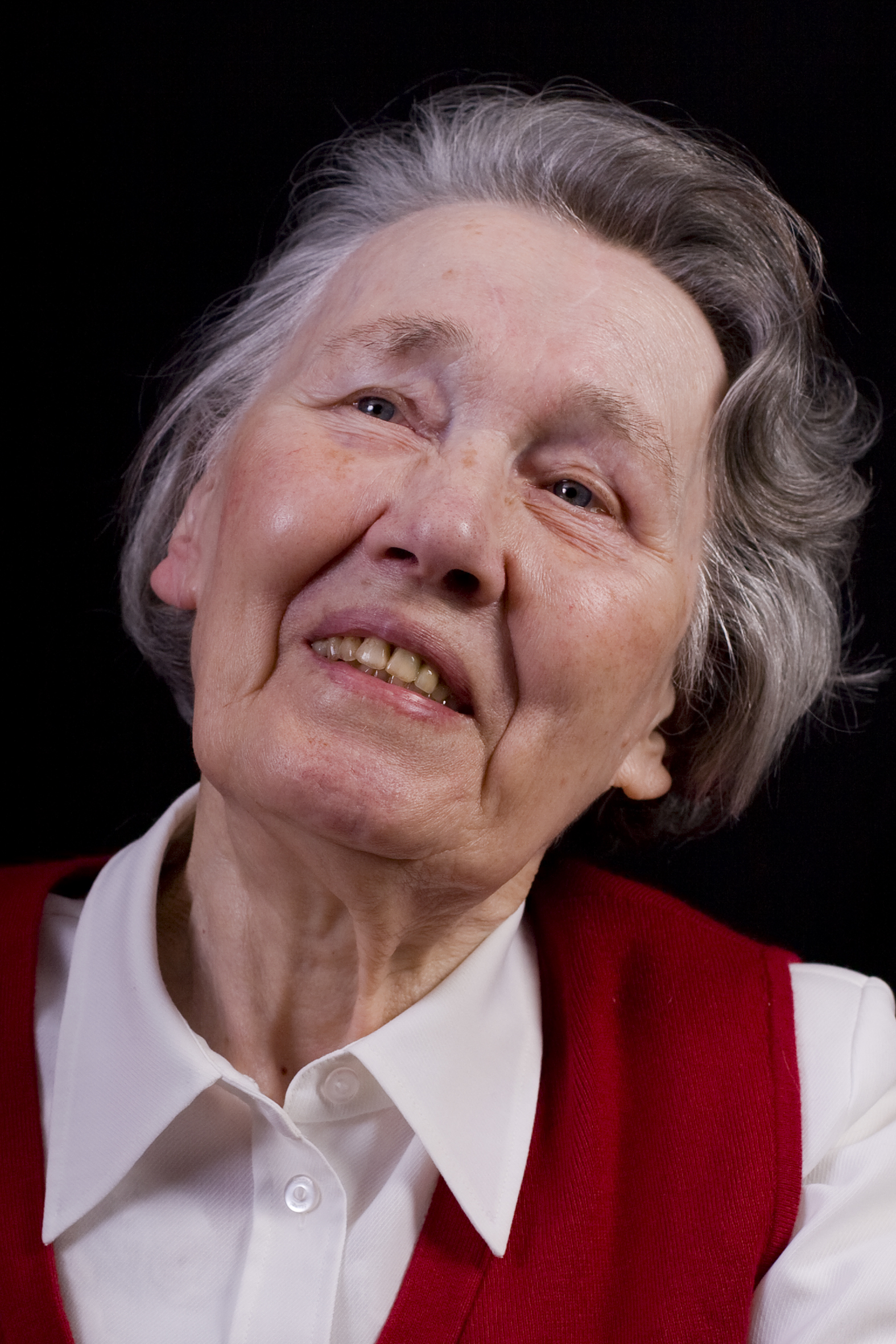
Aafje Heynis in 2008

== Discography ==
- Bach, Handel: Sacred Arias, Pierre Palla, Walther Schneiderhan (violinist), Nikolaus Hübner, Meindert Boekel; Vienna Symphony Orchestra, Amsterdam Chamber Orchestra, Prop Musica Choir; Dir. Hans Gillesberger, Marinus Voorberg, Lex Karsemeijer.
- Bach: Cantatas BWV 170 & 169, Sacred Songs, Albert de Klerk, Simon Jansen; Netherlands Chamber Orchestra, Netherlands Bach Society Choir, Szymon Goldberg.
- Brahms: Choral Works & Overtures. Vienna Singverein, Vienna Symphony Orchestra; Dir. Wolfgang Sawallisch.
- Brahms: Alto Rhapsody, Royal Concertgebouw Orchestra, Apollo Royal Male Choir, Eduard Van Beinum (1958).
- Brahms, Vier ernste Gesänge, piano: Johan van den Boogert (1958).
- Mahler: Symphony No. 2 "Resurrection", Elly Ameling, Royal Concertgebouw Orchestra, Netherlands Radio Chorus, Bernard Haitink, 1968.
- Schubert: Rosamunde, Royal Concertgebouw Orchestra, Bernard Haitink.
- Antonio Vivaldi: The five compositions on Christ's Passion and Introduction to the Miserere, I Solisti Di Milano, Angelo Ephrikian, 1966.

Compilations

- Het Puik van zoete kelen (The Cream of Glorious Voices) Philips Dutch Masters 464 385-2 (includes her performance "Sea Slumber Song" by Edward Elgar)
- Les rarissimes de Aafje Heinis: Gluck, Haydn, Dorjak, Franck, Caplet, Brahms, Schuinbert, R. Strauss, Wolf, Mahler (EMI, 2005)
