= Harriet Cohen International Music Award =

British music award

The Harriet Cohen International Music Award was founded in 1951 by Sir Arnold Bax and others, in honour of the British pianist Harriet Cohen.

It is to be distinguished from the Harriet Cohen Bach Prize, established in 1994, for the most deserving pupil at the Royal Academy of Music in the field of Bach piano playing.

== Recipients ==
=== 1950s ===
1951

- Philippe Entremont – Piano Medal

1954

- Ingrid Haebler – Beethoven Medal

1955

- Donald Bell – Arnold Bax Memorial Medal, outstanding student from the Commonwealth
- Jacques Klein
- Richard Farrell – Medal for Piano
- Kenneth Schermerhorn

1956

- Rohan de Saram

1957

- Eduardo Vercelli (Buenos Aires, 1935 – Geneva, 1993)
- Mario delli Ponti – Bach Medal
- Adam Harasiewicz, for outstanding achievement in piano

1958

- Ahmed Adnan Saygun – Jean Sibelius Composition Medal
- Miguel Querol Gavalda – Gold Medal
- Peter-Lukas Graf

1959

- Theo Bruins – Beethoven medal
- Glenn Gould – Bach Medal
- İdil Biret – Dinu Lipatti gold medal
- Luis Garcia-Renart – Cello Prize

=== 1960s ===
1960

- Joaquín Achúcarro – Best Debut of the Year
- Piet Kee – Bach Medal
- Bogdan Paprocki – Opera Medal

1961

- Elliott Carter – Sibelius Medal for Composition
- Aafje Heynis – outstanding artistry
- Oscar Mischiati – A. Davison Memorial Medal for Musicology

1962

- Barbara Hesse-Bukowska – British Medal
- Byron Janis – Beethoven Medal (for best performance of two Beethoven Sonatas, the "Waldstein" and Opus 109)
- Yonty Solomon – Beethoven Medal
- Arve Tellefsen
- Yaltah Menuhin / Joel Ryce
- Diane Andersen – Bach Medal

1963

- Vladimir Ashkenazy – Piano Prize (shared)
- Norma Fisher – Piano Prize (shared)
- Louise Talma – Sibelius Medal for Composition
- Gloria Saarinen – Commonwealth Medal
- Francis Chagrin – Film Composer of the Year
- Anita Välkki

1964

- Bernadette Greevy
- Nelson Freire

1965

- Martin Isepp – Carroll Donner Stuchell Medal for Accompanying

1966

- Marie Collier
- Waleri Gradow (Valery Gradow)
- Ronald Stevenson – for Busoni centenary radio programme (possibly award year was 1967)

1967

- José-Luis Garcia
- François Glorieux

1968

- Roger Smalley – Contemporary music performance
- Maureen Forrester – the Council's Prize
- William Mathias – Bax Society Prize
- Fernande Kaeser – Beethoven Medal
- Fine Art Orchestra – Chamber Music Gold Medal

=== 1990s ===
1996

- Roger Owens

=== 2000s ===
2001

- Ilid Jones

2002

- Cheryl Frances-Hoad (joint winner)

2005

- Victoria Davies, harpist

=== Dates not yet determined ===
- Sebastian Benda – Bach Medal
- Jennifer Bullock
- Edwin Carr
- Maria Clodes (Maria Clodes-Jaguaribe) – best young pianist of the year
- Paul Max Edlin
- Christopher Green-Armytage
- Jerome Jelinek – cello
- Fernando Laires – Beethoven Medal (in memory of Artur Schnabel)
- Aase Nordmo Løvberg (Gold medal for singing)
- Elizabeth Powell
- Abbey Simon
- Erna Spoorenberg
- Koji Toyoda – Bach medal
- Valerie Tryon
- Elena Vorotko – Bach Prize
- Ronald Woodcock
