= Jorge Isaac =

Jorge Isaac (born 1974 in Caracas, Venezuela) completed his professional training under with Walter van Hauwe at the Conservatorium van Amsterdam in 2000. In 2002, Isaac received his Master's degree in contemporary performance and live electronics at the same institution. In 2006 he was appointed as Professor of recorder at the Conservatorium van Amsterdam, carrying on the famous Amsterdam Recorder School.

Jorge Isaac has been awarded several international prizes, such as the International Gaudeamus Interpreters Competition 2001 (including the special prize "best use of electronics") in The Netherlands and the Krzysztof Penderecki International Competition of Contemporary Music in Poland (2001). In 2004 he was awarded the first prize at the Jur Naessens Music Award in Amsterdam with his multimedia production "Mensa Secunda". In 2007 he received an Award of Distinction at the Prix Ars Electronica in Austria for his work "Marionette".

As a soloist, Isaac has given a large number of performances and masterclasses over the globe. He has participated in varied recording productions, such as radio broadcasts for the Hessen's radio (HR4) in Germany, Teldec (Germany), Concertzender (NL), blockflute samplers in the US, and his own music together with the film composer Elik Alvarez (Los Angeles). Over 150 new compositions have been specially written for him.

Jorge Isaac has collaborated with the ensembles Asko/Schönberg, Nieuw Ensemble, the Dutch Chamber Orchestra, The Dutch National Ballet, The Dutch Opera, stage director Pierre Audi, the composer György Ligeti, and the conductor Reinbert de Leeuw, among many other artists.

He is at the moment involved with a great variety of concerts and recitals, early and new music projects, multimedia performances, his teaching activities at the Conservatorium van Amsterdam, and in the production of large interdisciplinary works together with the Visisonor Foundation.
