= Luis García Renart =

Spanish-born Mexican cellist (1936–2020)

Luis García Renart (Barcelona) was a Spanish-born Mexican cellist. He often performed with his sister, the pianist Marta García Renart.

== Biography ==
Born in Barcelona, Garcia first studied at the National Conservatory of Music (Mexico) and then at the conservatories of Bern and Basel in Switzerland with Sándor Veress and Sándor Végh. Between 1956 and 1960 he studied directly under Pablo Casals in France and Puerto Rico. In 1959 he won the Harriet Cohen International Music Award. In 1960 he won a scholarship to study at the Moscow Conservatory with Mstislav Rostropovich and Aram Khachaturian. In 1963 he won the Young Concert Artists International Auditions which led to his New York City recital debut at Carnegie Hall. He had then performed as a soloist with orchestras and music ensembles throughout Europe, the Soviet Union, Israel, North America, and South America. He was part of the cello faculty at both Bard College Conservatory of Music and Vassar College. Several of his students, such as Tom Cora, have gone on to have successful careers of their own.

Mr. Garcia-Renart was artistic director of The Woodstock Chamber Orchestra (NY) from 1991 to 2002.

Professor Garcia-Renart died on July 6, 2020, at the age of 84.
