= Dispokinesis =

Form of training and therapy specially developed for musicians and stage artists

Dispokinesis (neologism from: “disponese” = lat. “to have at one’s disposal” and “kinesis” = gr. “movement”) is a form of training and therapy specially developed for musicians and stage artists by Gerrit Onne van de Klashorst (Netherlands). First scientific evidence for the effect of Dispokinesis on musicians, both professional and musicians-in-training, has been published. Dispokinesis can be employed in a pedagogy and preventive medicine setting as well as in therapy and rehabilitation. By means of the Original Shapes of Movement and Posture, the human being's sensori- and psychomotor development is being worked through from lying down to crawling to the upright standing position. By doing so, possibly existing developmental gaps can be closed and especially the postural reflexes (postural motor system) are being fostered. Specific exercises focussing on instrumental and vocal technique as well as ergonomic aids developed in connection with Dispokinesis also play an important role. Among them can be found sitting aids for instruments played in orchestra and for the keyboard family, chin rests and shoulder pads for the upper strings or belts, thumb or knee-supports for wind and plucked instruments. The competence in instrumental and vocal technique as well as body awareness and expressivity are consistently developed in view of the requirements to be met on stage.

== The Development of Dispokinesis ==
Dispokinesis was developed more than 45 years ago in the environment of the Sweelinck-Conservatory, Amsterdam. Its founder, Gerrit Onne van de Klashorst (Netherlands), was a pianist and physiotherapist. He developed Dispokinesis as an independent technique in collaboration with music pedagogues and the department of neurophysiology of the Amsterdam University. The term Disposition, which Dispokinesis was derived of, was additionally coined by the pedagogue and musicologist S. Eberhard. Further influences stem from the Buytendijk's systematic view of posture and movement, as well as the reflex-oriented work in physiotherapy according to Bobath.

In the first instance, Dispokinesis is a holistic educational and therapeutic training based on neurophysiology developed by musicians for musicians. Its fundaments are laid by functional anatomy, neurophysiology and developmental psychology. It also incorporates findings from the fields of sensorimotor and psychomotor learning processes and motor-skill developmental stages. Furthermore, knowledge and experience relating to posture, playing position, breathing and instrumental technique of all instruments and singing is included, the notion of auditory-motor skills (i.e. the connection between movement and sound) as well as the various options regarding ergonomic solutions. In addition to the practice and teaching of posture, breathing and movement, Dispokinesis encompasses processes such as becoming aware of and reflecting on the ability of singing, playing and expressivity as a professional musician. Disposition (or: “the certainty of having a good disposition”) is understood as having the liberty of musical expression in a physical, mental and emotional sense, especially in a performance setting. By transmitting its knowledge and exercises, Dispokinesis aims to influence health prevention and to provide musicians and music pedagogues with a repertory of self-help options when resolving problems. In case of pre-existing difficulties, Dispokinesis can increase independency of therapists and doctors due to its exercises developed with the aim of autonomy and can eliminate functional deficits on various levels.

== Approach ==
Dispokinesis takes several approaches, either simultaneously or consecutively:

1) The transmission of the Original Shapes of Posture, Breathing and Movement (German: “Urgestalten”), enabling further development or post-maturation of sensory- and psychomotor skills. Taking into account the expressive content of movement, the approx. 35 basic exercises mirror the human developmental stages from lying on the floor to crawling to standing in the upright position. These exercises can be embedded in a pedagogical as well as a therapeutic setting. The exercises’ recurrent themes are the calibration of the body's stabilising functions in relation to its differentiated patterns of free-flowing movement and breathing. Intensified proprioception, increased awareness of the postural reflexes, as well as the various processes affecting respiration and movement can be obtained by means of a sensorimotor and psychomotor re-education

2) The individual, optimal adaptation of the instrument to the body by means of specialised ergonomic aids. All aspects of ergonomics are being considered, such as: Sitting supports for orchestra instruments and keyboard instruments (adaptable in height and angle of inclination); endpins, adaptable in shape, length and dimension; chin rests and shoulder pads for stringed instruments; belts, thumb or knee supports for wind and plucked instruments. The adaptation of these ergonomic aids in turn depends on a physiologically sensible posture when playing the instrument, which can simultaneously be in the process of transformation.

3) Specific exercises: Visualising and learning processes referring to playing technique, refined perception of playing and breathing for all instruments including voice with the aim of economising, varying and differentiating the approach to instrumental technique, expression variability and competency on stage. Keywords are: Ability to dose tension and strength in posture, breathing and movement, ability of differentiating and dosing the contact to the instrument, e.g. via strings, pad cups, keys, mouthpieces, etc.; independence of both hands, imagination/visualisation of sound and movement, feeling for “spaces within and in the surrounding”, contact to the audience and the way to deal with so-called stage fright or music performance anxiety.

== Procedure and Effect of Dispokinesis ==
After an in-depth general and task-specific anamnesis, a sensori- and psychomotor analysis while playing or singing follows. The basic positions of lying down, crawling, sitting and standing are examined separate from the instrument. Special attention is paid to the distribution of muscular activity and the capability of creating an equilibrium between stabilising and dynamic movements in task-specific postures, in addition to the aspects of the individual's “biography of personal expression”. Video recordings and an EMG-examination can be used as well.

Based on the diagnosis of playing-related indispositions, respectively of disturbances in posture, respiration and movement, the goal of Dispokinesis is to devise an individually tailored strategy to overcome these difficulties. This strategy is fundamentally different from mere gymnastic or strengthening exercises. The sensorimotor unity of physical perception and movement is never separated, nor are artificial and external motor patterns imposed on the individual. Much rather, the (re-)gaining of the individual's disposition is aimed for by means of the Original Shapes of Movement and Posture (German: “Urgestalten”) mentioned above, which make a connection between the chains of reflexes and experiences of physical perception in early childhood. By avoiding fixation on the purely physical level, the necessary liberty of musical inspiration and concentration on stage is permitted to come to the fore.

The complex and inseparable entity of these reflexes and physical perceptions are specifically targeted in Dispokinesis, albeit always in preparation for coherent musical expression. Within the vast area of reflexes, the postural reflexes (postural motor system) play a central role in the work of Dispokinesis. For example, they become relevant when avoiding conflicting co-innervations and are therefore a requirement for the flow of movement in target oriented fine motor control. They also ensure the process of assuming an upright position as a result of sensorimotor and psychomotor processes. Competency and security in the upright position (clearly defined floor contact, being centred, free upper part of the body, relaxed shoulders, arms and hands) are decisive factors when dealing with “stage fright” and aiming for a musical and technical rendering free of mistakes. With its attempt to optimise artistic competence and expressiveness in conjunction with instrumental technique and musicality, Dispokinesis provides additional exercises, visualisation and learning strategies. Thus, Dispokinesis goes beyond exercise therapies, self-awareness and relaxation, allowing for musical performance and acting on stage to become the focal point of activity. A period of work separate of the instrument or parallel to the practical work may however be necessary, allowing for new sensorimotor and psychomotor qualities to be integrated with more ease. Dispokinesis does not perceive itself as a psychological approach, but due to its work on sensorimotor processes, body-awareness and the ability of expressing oneself, it often indirectly touches on psychological experiences. With its holistic understanding of the human being, Dispokinesis takes an approach also known in modern humanistic psychology as the positive self-concept (16) of the individual. Therefore, provided a respective setting and professional coaching, a spontaneous, self-dynamic process is being triggered in the individual, with the aim of developing a sensation of autonomy and the ability of transmitting feelings and expression.

For Dispokinesis, the closing of developmental gaps comes before the treatment of symptoms. The art of “eliciting”, of non-directive transmission by drawing upon the motor-skill charge of a word (more seldom by touch), plays an important role in view of this goal. Eliciting is responsible for developing quality and precision of posture, expression and movements while playing. To exemplify: The word “grip” commonly used in music pedagogy, suggests a state of activity in hands and arms as when holding on tightly to an object. However, precisely this activity of gripping is one of the most common causes for tension and ailments in musicians. In this specific case, Dispokinesis would replace the word “grip” due to its unfavourable motor-skill charge. Words such as “finger positioning, “touching”, “accommodating” or “making contact with” could represent viable alternatives to elicit a better activity within the hands and arms, when making the connection with instrument-specific tasks. The experiences made in the framework of the Dispokinesis lessons or therapy settings shape the musician's own practicing as a “self-teaching” process and as a consequence the way own students are being taught. Working on often deeply engrained conceptions of playing, as well as the above-mentioned, largely sub-conscious self-perception and reflex systems, allows for constructively changing unfavourable stereotypes and automatisms. These can, inter alia, be counted to the causes of task-specific focal dystonia in musicians.

== Typical Indications for Dispokinesis ==
Functional disturbances and pain syndromes in musician and/or other professions with a high public exposure, indispositions of expression and performing, stage fright, disturbances in posture, respiration and motor patterns. Dispokinesis can be taught in individual and group lessons. In single cases, already few sessions can lead to changes, but often a long-term process needs to be taken into account.

== Formation in Dispokinesis ==
The certified Dispokinesis-teachers, resp. therapists (worldwide approx. 200) have all completed a professional musical formation, a year of mandatory individual preparation as well as the part-time Dispokinesis formation of two, resp. three years. Dispokinesis-therapists have additionally gone through medical or psychological studies or physiotherapeutic training. Possibilities to go through formation presently exist close to Düsseldorf, Germany with the Society for Dispokinesis, after G.O. van de Klashorst and the European Society for Dispokinesis. Most of the certified Dispokinesis-teachers are musicians as their main profession, be this as teachers at music schools or music colleges or orchestra musicians/performers. Physiotherapists, doctors and psychologists, who have included Dispokinesis in their work, still remain an exception.
