= Eckart Altenmüller =

German physician and musician

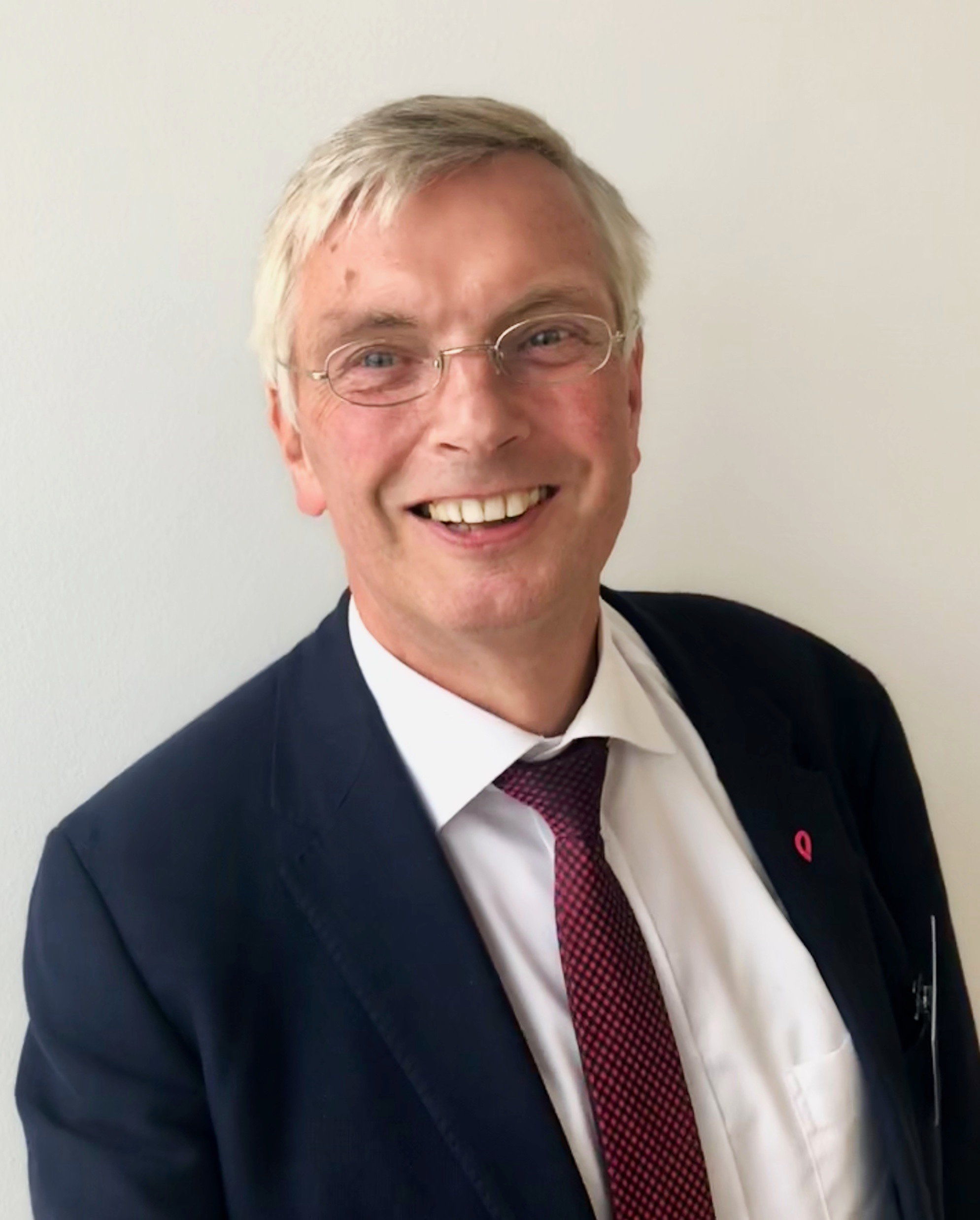
- Altenmüller in 2018
- Born: 19 December 1955 (age 70)
- Education: Eberhard-Karls-Universität
- Occupation: Physician

Eckart Altenmüller (born 19 December 1955) is a German physician and musician and one of the leading researchers in the field of neurophysiology and neuropsychology of musicians.

== Life ==
Born in Rottweil, Altenmüller studied medicine in Eberhard-Karls-Universität and Hôtel-Dieu in Paris from 1974 to 1981 and music at the Musikhochschule Freiburg from 1979 to 1985 (mainly flute). After receiving his doctorate in medicine from the Albert Ludwigs University in Freiburg, he also trained as a specialist in neurology.

Since 1994, Altenmüller has been a university professor and director of the Institute for Music Physiology and Musicians' Medicine at the Hochschule für Musik, Theater und Medien Hannover.

Since 2005, Altenmüller has been a full member of the Göttingen Academy of Sciences and Humanities. In 2013, he was awarded the Lower Saxony Science Prize.

From 2005 to 2011, he was president and vice-president from 2011 to 2018, of the Deutsche Gesellschaft für Musikphysiologie und Musikermedizin.

== Awards ==
- Scholarship of the Studienstiftung des deutschen Volkes.

== Works ==
=== Books ===
- Music, Motor Control and the Brain. Editado por Eckart Altenmüller, Mario Wiesendanger y Jürg Kesselring. Oxford University Press, 2006, ISBN 978-0-19-929872 -
- Edited with Claudia Spahn and Bernhard Richter: MusikerMedizin: Diagnostik, Therapie und Prävention von musikerspezifischen Erkrankungen. Schattauer, Stuttgart 2010, ISBN 978-3-7945-6364-7.
- Neurologische Erkrankungen bei Musikern. Springer 2002 ISBN 978-3642370007.
- Vom Neandertal in die Philharmonie: Warum der Mensch ohne Musik nicht leben kann Springer 2018 ISBN 978-3827416810.

=== CDs ===
- Neurobiologie und -psychologie starker Emotionen – Lachen und Weinen in der Musik. Auditorium Netzwerk Müllheim

=== DVDs ===
- Warum wir Musik lieben: Zur Neurobiologie der Sprache des Gefühls. Auditorium Verlag Müllheim
