= Jaap Spaanderman =

Dutch musician and conductor

Jacobus Hendrikus Bastiaan "Jaap" Spaanderman jr. (17 October 1896 in Gouda – 22 July 1985 in Laren) was a Dutch pianist, cellist, conductor and piano and conducting pedagogue.

Jaap Spaanderman jr. was the son of organist and conductor Jacobus Hendrikus Bastiaan Spaanderman sr. (1864–1943).

He studied cello with Isaac Mossel and piano with Sarah Bosmans-Benedicts. He received the Dutch Prize of Excellence twice, once as a cellist (in 1918) and once as a pianist (1920), both at the Conservatoire of Amsterdam. He further studied conducting with Hagel in Berlin.

In his early twenties he made two concert tours through the Dutch East Indies, present-day Indonesia. From 1922 he taught piano at the Conservatoire of the Society Amsterdam 'Muzieklyceum' (one of the predecessors of the Conservatorium van Amsterdam). In 1932 he was appointed as conductor of the Philharmonic Orchestra of Arnhem. In 1949 he returned to his school in Amsterdam, now teaching piano and conducting.

Among the many students of Jaap Spaanderman are Bart Berman, Theo Bruins, Albert Brussee, Stanley Hoogland, Jan Marisse Huizing, Guus Janssen, Hans Kox, Reinbert de Leeuw, Lucas Vis, Hans Vonk and Edo de Waart.
