= Conservatorium van Amsterdam =

Dutch academy of music

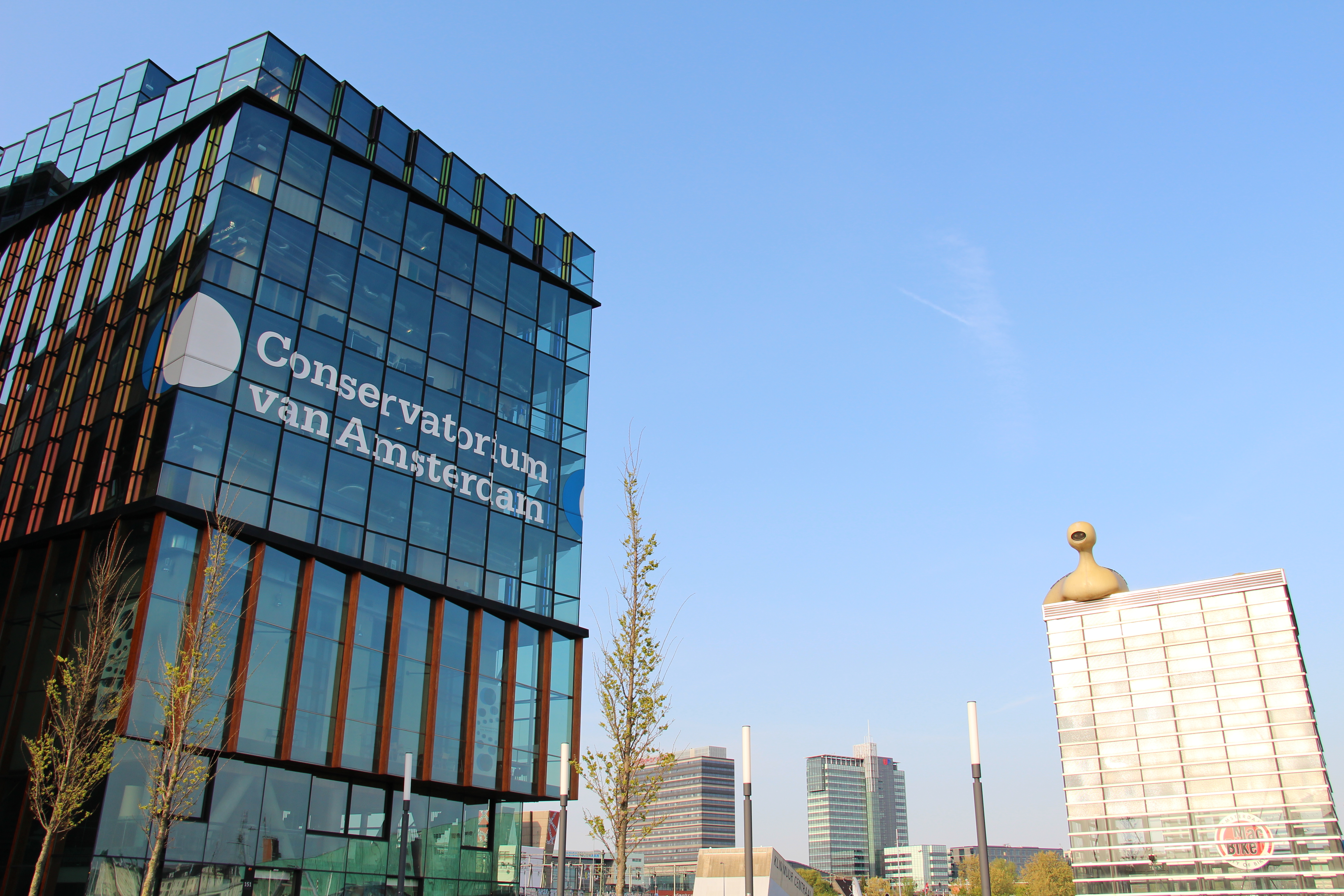
- Type: Conservatoire
- Established: 1884; 142 years ago (as Amsterdamsch Conservatorium); 1976; 50 years ago (as Sweelinck Conservatorium); 1994; 32 years ago (as Conservatorium van Amsterdam)
- Parent institution: Amsterdam University of the Arts
- Director: Okke Westdorp
- Location: Amsterdam, Netherlands; 52°22′33″N 4°54′32″E
- Website: Official website

The Conservatorium van Amsterdam (CvA) is a Dutch conservatoire of music located in Amsterdam. This school is the music division of the Amsterdam University of the Arts, the city's vocational university of arts. The Conservatorium van Amsterdam is the largest music academy in the Netherlands, offering programs in classical music, jazz, pop, electronic music, early music, music education, and opera.

== History ==
The history of the institution includes a number of different organisations and mergers: its oldest predecessor, the Amsterdamsch Conservatorium, was founded in 1884 (by Julius Röntgen, Frans Coenen and Daniël de Lange), four years before the opening of the Concertgebouw.

In 1920, a competing music academy was established in Amsterdam by a society called Muzieklyceum (or, Conservatorium van de Vereniging Muzieklyceum). The Bachzaal, used by the Amsterdamsch Conservatorium, was completed in 1931.

In 1976, the Amsterdamsch Conservatorium, Conservatory of the Muzieklyceum Society and the Haarlems Muzieklyceum merged to form the Sweelinck Conservatorium. This "new" academy of music moved to the former savings bank building in the Van Baerlestraat in 1985. In 1994, the Sweelinck Conservatorium merged with Hilversums Conservatorium to form the Conservatorium van Amsterdam. From 1998, its training programmes took place in their facilities in Van Baerlestraat and the Nieuwe Vaart. In 2008, the school moved to Oosterdokseiland.

== Building ==
Since 21 April 2008 the Conservatorium van Amsterdam has its home in a new building at the Oosterdokseiland, near Amsterdam Central Station. The new building is centrally located in a cultural area, including the 'Muziekgebouw' with three concert halls for classical music and jazz, and the public library. Other faculties of the Amsterdam University of the Arts (Amsterdamse Hogeschool voor de Kunsten in Dutch) are within walking distance.

This new complex is designed and equipped to current standards. Students can organize solo or ensemble concerts, create interesting projects with other music students or students from other art disciplines. They also make their own posters and flyers, sell tickets, or record their concerts in one of the concert halls and broadcast them on the internet radio at the CvA website.

The design, by Dutch architect Frits van Dongen, is based on the 'Engawa model', the Japanese way of building, where the corridors are situated next to the outer walls of the building and the concert halls, classrooms and study rooms, within. Large windows in the front transmits sufficient daylight into the rooms. This building method is intended to enable students to study without being disturbed, while corridors keep noises out.

The new building contains three units. At ground level there are four halls:

- Bernard Haitinkzaal, a large hall with 450 seats
- Amsterdam Blue Note, a hall for jazz and pop concerts, which seats 200
- Sweelinckzaal, a recital hall with 120 seats
- Theaterzaal, which seats 50

The Bernard Haitinkzaal and Sweelinckzaal have windows which transmit daylight, which is exceptional for a concert hall. All halls have recording equipment, so that each concert or playing exam can be recorded. There is also a foyer and a canteen at ground level.

At the next level there are four floors with lesson and classrooms and on top of these there are two floors with the library, a lecture hall and study rooms.

Acoustic planning was by Akoestisch bureau Peutz, who researched the acoustic requirements of the lesson and study rooms and concert halls.

== People ==
=== Faculty ===
==== Current ====
- Richard Ayres
- Boris Belkin
- Ilya Grubert
- Willem Jeths
- Peter Kooy
- Anna Korsun
- Jaap ter Linden
- Bart van Oort
- Tjako van Schie
- Ed Spanjaard
- Jos van Veldhoven

==== Emeriti ====
- Willem Andriessen (also an alumnus)
- Oskar Back
- Klaas Bolt
- Sarah Bosmans-Benedicts
- Max van Egmond
- Peter Erős
- Vesko Eschkenazy
- Wim Henderickx
- Herman Krebbers
- Ton de Leeuw
- Gustav Leonhardt
- Murray Perahia
- António Chagas Rosa
- Jaap Spaanderman (also an alumnus)
- Harry Sparnaay
- Theo Verbey
- Matthijs Verschoor (also an alumnus)
- Abbie de Quant

=== Alumni ===
- Mimi Aarden
- Svitlana Azarova
- Kees Bakels
- Pieter-Jan Belder
- Bart Berman
- Coenraad Bloemendal
- Hendrik Bouman
- Frans Brüggen
- Theo Bruins
- Sytse Buwalda
- Hans Davidsson
- Thoms Dunn
- Caro Emerald
- Ivo van Emmerik
- Tom Gaebel
- Sim Gokkes
- Bernard Haitink
- Majoie Hajary
- Walter Hekster
- Robert Hill
- Ilse Huizinga
- Jorge Isaac
- Rudolf Jansen
- Christine Kamp
- Rudolf Koelman
- Reinbert de Leeuw
- Charles van der Leeuw
- Theo Loevendie
- Michael Lowenstern
- Daniel Moult
- Ben van Oosten
- Tera de Marez Oyens
- Ella van Poucke
- Robin de Raaff
- Lawrence Renes
- Martin Schmeding
- Cameron Shahbazi
- Paul Gutama Soegijo
- Marjo Tal
- Signe Tollefsen
- Merlijn Twaalfhoven
- Geertruida Vladeracken
- Frank Peter Zimmermann
- Uxia Martinez Botana

== See also ==
- Dispokinesis
