= Didier van Damme =

European Adviser and also composer

Didier Van Damme (born 1929) is a European adviser. He was also a composer and conductor.

Some of his notable compositions are "Adagio to Europe" (Adagio à l'Europe) (1970), Rhapsodie d'Alicante, and "Concerto de la Reine" (Queen's Concerto) (1960), written on the occasion of the wedding of King Baudouin of Belgium to Queen Fabiola.
