= Kortrijk Conservatory =

Music and dance conservatory In Kortrijk, Belgium

Coordinates: 50°49′31″N 3°15′40″E

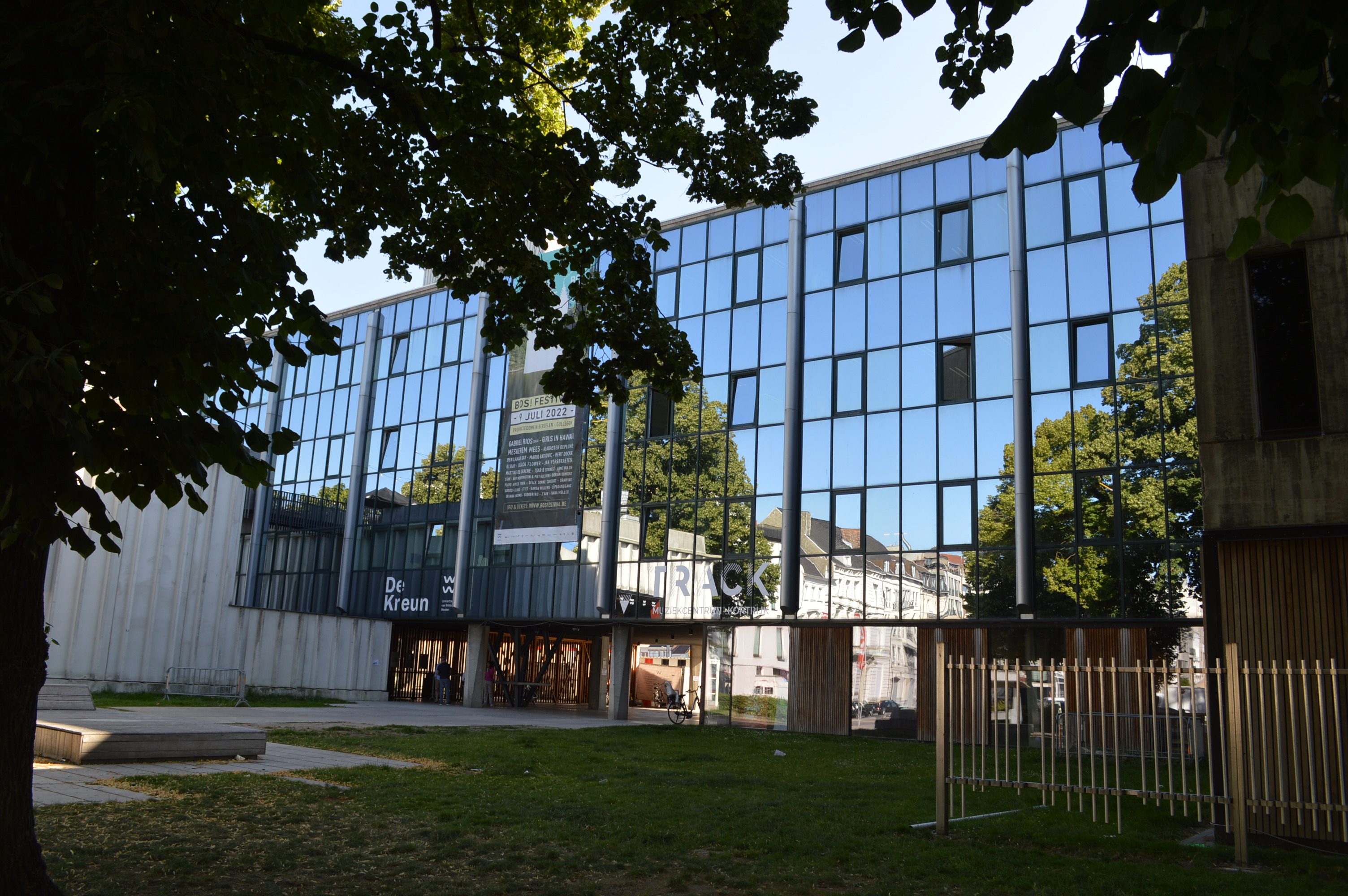
Kortrijk Conservatory

Kortrijk Conservatory (Dutch: Conservatorium van Kortrijk) is a music and dance conservatory in Kortrijk, Belgium.

== History ==
The conservatory was established in 1870 as a music school. In 1924 it branched out into Dutch and French recitation and theatre. The current pillared geometric glass building was designed by architects A.G. and P.A. Pauwels and was built in the early 1970s on the site of a demolished prison. Radio 2 West Flanders also joined the building. In the new building, the conservatory began dance courses in the 1970s.

Since its establishment, the conservatory has taught over 100,000 students.
