= List of contemporary classical ensembles =

This page lists ensembles that specialise in contemporary classical music.

- Ahn Trio
- Alarm Will Sound
- American Modern Ensemble
- The Array Ensemble/Arraymusic
- Arditti Quartet
- Ascolta
- Asko|Schönberg
- Athelas Sinfonietta Copenhagen
- Australia Ensemble
- AXIOM Ensemble
- Balanescu Quartet
- Bang on a Can All Stars
- Birmingham Contemporary Music Group
- BIT20 Ensemble
- Canadian Brass
- California EAR Unit
- Centro de Experimentación y Producción de Música Contemporánea
- The City of Tomorrow
- Concorde
- Corigliano Quartet
- Crash Ensemble
- Da Capo Chamber Players
- Del Sol Quartet
- Der Gestanke
- Divertimento Ensemble
- Duo46
- Dynamis Ensemble
- Earplay
- eighth blackbird
- ELISION Ensemble
- Endymion
- Ensamble Kaparilo
- Ensemble 10/10
- Ensemble Alternance
- Ensemble Ars Nova
- Ensemble Contemporain de Montréal
- Ensemble Dal Niente
- Ensemble for Intuitive Music Weimar
- Ensemble Hopper
- Ensemble InterContemporain
- Ensemble l'Itinéraire
- ensemble mise-en
- Ensemble Modern
- Ensemble Recherche
- Ensemble Sortisatio
- Ensemble Studio6
- Ethel
- Fires of London
- Fuse Ensemble
- Gamelan Son of Lion
- Group 180
- Hanke Brothers
- Hilliard Ensemble
- Hoketus
- Hyperion Ensemble
- Icebreaker
- Ictus Ensemble
- International Contemporary Ensemble
- Klangforum Wien
- Kronos Quartet
- Los Angeles Electric 8
- London Contemporary Orchestra
- London Sinfonietta
- Melos Ensemble
- MusikFabrik
- Nash Ensemble
- New York New Music Ensemble
- Newband
- Nouvel Ensemble Moderne
- Orchestra 2001
- Oslo Sinfonietta
- Les Percussions de Strasbourg
- Philip Glass Ensemble
- Piano Circus
- Present Music
- Project Trio
- Psappha New Music Ensemble
- Quince Ensemble
- Red Note Ensemble
- Relâche
- Remix Ensemble
- Sentieri selvaggi
- S.E.M. Ensemble
- Silesian String Quartet
- Smith Quartet
- So Percussion
- Sond'Ar-te Electric Ensemble
- Síntese - Grupo de Música Contemporânea
- Speculum Musicae
- Symphony Number One
- Synchronos Ensemble
- Tambuco
- Theatre of Voices
- Thelema Trio
- Topology
- Toimii
- Steve Reich and Musicians (Steve Reich Ensemble)
- Threnody Ensemble
- University of Chicago Contemporary Chamber Players
- Uproar Ensemble (Wales)
- Uusinta Ensemble
- Xenakis Ensemble
- Ensemble Metamorphosis
