= Ciarán Farrell =

Irish composer (born 1969)

- Born: 1969 (age 56–57); Dublin, Ireland
- Occupation: Composer
- Years active: 1997 to present
- Label: RTÉ lyric fm
- Website: Ciarán Farrell's Website. Ciarán Farrell at MySpace.

Ciarán Farrell (born 1969, Dublin, Ireland) is an Irish composer who has been active in his field since graduating from Trinity College Dublin in 1997. He has composed works for orchestra, ensemble, choir, and solo instruments, as well as for TV and film productions.

== Early life and education ==
Farrell was raised in a music-loving household and growing up he studied piano and clarinet at the Royal Irish Academy of Music. In his teens, he took up the guitar and later went on to study the classical guitar at the Dublin Institute of Technology Conservatory of Music and Drama. He received his degree in music from Trinity College Dublin, and he also took classes with Ennio Morricone at the Accademia Musicale Chigiana in Siena, Italy.

== Composition career ==
Farrell has received commissions from the BBC, RTÉ Performing Groups, RTÉ lyric fm (RTÉ Concert Orchestra with actor Barry McGovern), saxophonist Gerard McChrystal, the Smith Quartet, Katie McMahon, Concorde Contemporary Music Ensemble, and John Feeley, amongst others. He has also worked with Irish dance theatre companies, Cois Ceim and Irish Modern Dance Theatre.

Farrell has also worked on numerous TV and film productions including the internationally broadcast series Divine Magic and Eyes on the World. Other production companies he worked with include C4, Discovery Channel, RTÉ, TG4, Littlebird Pictures, Decent Suit and Non-Fiction Films. In his early years as a composer, he composed music for numerous commercials/inserts including the Heineken and Shell campaigns.

The first solo collection of Farrell's music, Perfect State, was released on the RTÉ lyric fm label. Less than three weeks after its official launch at the Clarence Hotel in Dublin on 24 September 2007, Perfect State entered the HMV classical charts in Ireland at No. 13 and made its way to No. 1. This album features performances by some of the foremost musicians between Britain and Ireland including the RTÉ Concert Orchestra, Craig Ogden, Gerard McChrystal and the Smith Quartet.

His second solo collection, Jolt, was released in December 2011 and features Irish guitarist Damien Kelly. Less than a week after its release on iTunes it made its way to the No. 1 position in the Irish classical iTunes charts.

On 7 December 2012 a new album of solo guitar music, 'New Frontiers', was launched at the Royal Irish Academy of Music. The thirteen tracks on the album once again performed by guitarist Damien Kelly include unique new music for bottleneck slide and also music for guitar with digital delay.

His music has been released on numerous other CDs including Gerard McChrystal and Craig Ogden's Pluckblow, Music for Saxophone and Guitar, released on the Meridian Records label; Katie McMahon's album Shine, of which he wrote the title track; and John Feeley's album E-Motion, of which the original solo guitar version of "The Shannon Suite" can be heard.

== Discography ==
=== Redbrick Duo ===
Guitarist Damien Kelly and flautist Jessica Lipstone, (Redbrick Duo), play Farrell's three-movement work, 'Three Piece Suite' on this title.

=== New Frontiers ===
New Frontiers (2012), Farrell Kelly.

Composer: Ciarán Farrell. Guitar: Damien Kelly.

1. "A Rainy Day in Summer" –Damien Kelly, (guitar/bottleneck). 2. "Dragonfly" –Damien Kelly, (guitar/bottleneck). 3. "Skeleton Man" –Damien Kelly, (guitar/bottleneck). 4. "Lough Allen" –Damien Kelly, (guitar). 5. "Lough Ree" –Damien Kelly, (guitar). 6. "Lough Derg" –Damien Kelly, (guitar). 7. "Air Travel" –Damien Kelly, (guitar/digitaldelay). 8. "Sea Travel" –Damien Kelly, (guitar/digitaldelay). 9. "Land Travel" –Damien Kelly, (guitar/digitaldelay). 10. "Space Travel" –Damien Kelly, (guitar/digitaldelay). 11. "Jolt" –Damien Kelly, (guitar). 12. "Rhapsody" –Damien Kelly, (guitar). 13. "Wild Stream" –Damien Kelly, (guitar).

=== Jolt ===
Jolt (2011), Farrell Kelly.

Composer: Ciarán Farrell. Guitar: Damien Kelly.

1. "Wild Stream" –Damien Kelly, (guitar). 2. "Rhapsody" –Damien Kelly, (guitar). 3. "Jolt" –Damien Kelly, (guitar). 4. "Air Travel" (for guitar with digital delay)" –Damien Kelly, (guitar).

=== Perfect State ===
Perfect State (2007), RTÉ lyric fm

Composer: Ciarán Farrell.

1. "Perfect State" –RTÉ Concert Orchestra conducted by David Brophy 2. "The Shannon Suite" –Craig Ogden, (guitar); Gerard McChrystal, (soprano saxophone) 3. "Around and About" –Sinead Farrell, (flute); Roger Moffat, (vibraphone) 4. "The Pilgrim's Return" –Smith Quartet; and Gerard McChrystal, (soprano saxophone) 5. "Hopkins on Skellig Michael" (Poem by Paddy Bushe) –RTÉ Concert Orchestra, conducted by David Brophy; speaker Barry McGovern

=== Pluckblow ===
Virtuosos Gerard McChrystal (saxophone) and Craig Ogden (guitar) play an arrangement of Farrell's three-movement work, 'The Shannon Suite' on this release.

=== E-Motion ===
Guitarist John Feeley plays the original solo guitar version of, 'The Shannon Suite' on this title.

=== Shine ===
Singer Katie McMahon uses Farrell's song 'Shine' as the title piece for this release.

=== Contemporary Music from Ireland – vol. 5 ===
'Source', from Farrell's seven-movement orchestral work, 'Hopkins on Skellig Michael' is featured on this CD from the Contemporary Music Centre in Dublin. Performed by the RTÉ Concert Orchestra, conducted by David Brophy; speaker Barry McGovern; poem by Paddy Bushe. The full piece can be heard on, Perfect State.
