= Bridge to Everywhere =

American chamber music ensemble

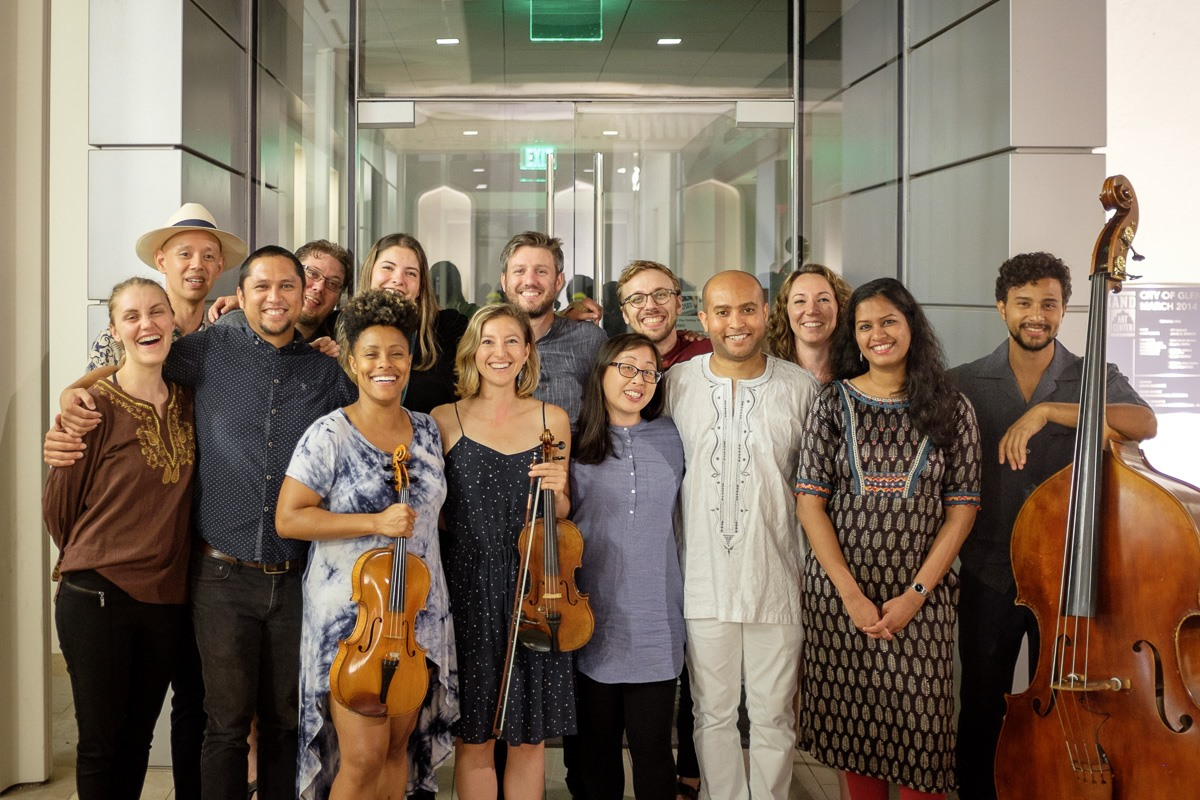
- Bridge to Everywhere after a performance at the Brand Library and Art Center in 2019

Background information
- Origin: Los Angeles, California, U.S.
- Genres: Classical
- Occupation: Chamber ensemble
- Years active: 2015–present
- Members: Derrick Skye, conductor; Rachel Iba, violin/concertmaster; Yvette Holzwarth, violin; Anna Kouchnerov, violin; Nikki Shorts, viola; Michelle Rearick, cello; Chris Votek, cello; Mark Gutierrez, bass; Philip Graulty, guitar; Marc Nimoy, guitar; Dimitris Mahlis, oud; Jacqueline Marshall, harp; Rachel Mellis, flute; Neelamjit Dhillon, saxophone/tabla/bansuri; Saili Oak, voice; Hannah Arista, voice; James Waterman, percussion; Ian Smith, sound engineer; Kim Tran, ethnomusicologist
- Website: www.bridgetoeverywhere.org

Bridge to Everywhere is a classical chamber music ensemble and arts organization based in the Los Angeles area that promotes cross-cultural collaborations through musical performances and educational programs. Bridge to Everywhere is currently the ensemble-in-residence at Mount St. Mary's University (Los Angeles).

== History ==
Bridge to Everywhere began as a recording project by composer Derrick Skye on Orenda Records in 2015. Bridge to Everywhere released its first commercial album Prisms, Cycles, Leaps in September of 2015, in conjunction with the world premiere of the Skye’s orchestral work, Prisms, Cycles, Leaps, by the Los Angeles Chamber Orchestra. The group became a more formalized performing ensemble and arts organization in 2016, with a debut performance at Theatre Raymond Kabbaz in 2017. Bridge to Everywhere has performed at venues such as the Los Angeles Philharmonic Noon to Midnight Festival, Eagle Rock Music Festival, Miles Memorial Playhouse, The York Manor, Brand Library and Art Center, Angel City Jazz Festival, Wallis Annenberg Center for the Performing Arts, and Boston Court Pasadena. Bridge to Everywhere won San Francisco Classical Voice's Los Angeles Area Audience Choice Award for "Best Chamber Performance" in the 2019-2020 season.

== Collaborations ==
Bridge to Everywhere has collaborated with Los Angeles-based performing arts groups and arts organizations including Salastina Music Society, CalArts Community Arts Partnership (CAP), Inner City Arts, American Composers Forum of Los Angeles, Bridge Projects, and the City of Los Angeles Cultural Affairs Department. In 2018, Bridge to Everywhere released its second album, American Mirror, in partnership with Salastina Music Society. This album was re-released in 2024 due to the name change of composer Derrick Skye. In 2024, Bridge to Everywhere released a full-length album titled “Unveiled” featuring original works by members Rachel Iba, Yvette Holzwarth, Hannah Arista, Dimitris Mahlis, Philip Graulty, Derrick Skye, and James Waterman. “Unveiled” was up for Grammy consideration under the category of best classical compilation.

== Ensemble and repertoire ==
Bridge to Everywhere's ensemble members are trained in classical music and also have extensive training in at least one other musical tradition. The ensemble is flexible in its configuration, and includes strings (violins, viola, cello, bass); various flutes including bansuri; saxophone; vocalists (Hindustani classical, western classical, jazz, pop, Bulgarian folk); guitars (electric and classical); electric bass; various percussion (including tabla and West African percussion); harp; piano and keyboard; Turkish oud; tanpura; and a conductor. Bridge to Everywhere's repertoire often interweaves elements from musical traditions around the world into a western classical music setting. A majority of the ensemble members are also composers (Derrick Skye, James Waterman, Philip Graulty, Anna Kouchnerov, Chris Votek, Yvette Holzwarth, Hannah Arista, Mark Gutierrez, Rachel Iba, Marc Nimoy, Neelamjit Dhillon, Dimitris Mahlis, Ian Smith), and the group often performs and premieres the work of living composers.

== Recordings ==
- Prisms, Cycles, Leaps (2024)
- American Mirror (2024)
- Unveiled (2024)
