= Derrick Skye =

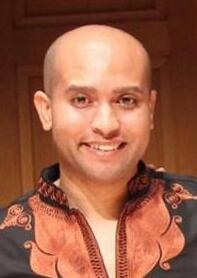
- Derrick Skye in 2017

Background information
- Born: 19 November 1982 (age 43)
- Origin: Los Angeles
- Genre: Classical
- Occupations: Composer, conductor, musician, educator
- Instruments: trombone, Ewe percussion
- Member of: Bridge to Everywhere
- Website: derrickskye.com

Derrick Skye (born Derrick Spiva Jr; 19 November 1982) is an American composer, conductor, musician, and educator based in the Los Angeles area who often integrates musical practices from cultures around the world in his works. The Los Angeles Times described Skye's music as "something to savor" and "enormous fun to listen to." The Times (London) described Skye's music as “deliciously head-spinning.” The 2023 album House of Belonging by Conspirare and Miró Quartet featured Skye's work "Black Ocean" and was nominated for a 2024 Grammy Award for Best Choral Performance.

== Career ==
Educated at University of California, Los Angeles, and California Institute of the Arts, Skye studied classical music as a student of Ian Krouse, Paul Chihara, David Rosenboom and Alex Shapiro, while also studying percussion with Randy Gloss, Persian music theory with Pirayeh Pourafar, Balkan music theory with Tzvetanka Varimezova, tala in Hindustani classical music with Swapan Chaudhuri and West African music and dance with Kobla Ladzekpo, Beatrice Lawluvi, and Yeko Ladzekpo-Cole. Skye's compositional works often incorporate musical elements from different cultural traditions into contemporary classical music contexts.

His works have been performed and/or commissioned by the Los Angeles Philharmonic, BBC National Orchestra of Wales, Vienna Radio Symphony Orchestra, Chineke! Orchestra, Los Angeles Chamber Orchestra, London Philharmonic Orchestra, Netherlands Philharmonic Orchestra, National Arts Centre Orchestra (Canada), Chicago Sinfonietta, Albany Symphony Orchestra, Dayton Philharmonic Orchestra, Berkeley Symphony, New West Symphony, Orchestra Santa Monica, Rochester Philharmonic Orchestra, Lian Ensemble, Los Angeles Electric 8, Lincoln Center, Carnegie Hall, The Juilliard School, Vijay Gupta, Blake Pouliot, Superdevoiche (Bulgarian Women's Choir), EXIGENCE, Los Angeles Master Chorale, Conspirare, The Cecilia Chorus of New York, Lyris Quartet, Miró Quartet, Formosa Quartet, Salastina Music Society, Juventas New Music Ensemble, Ensemble Connect, and other groups.

Rhythm and the embodiment of rhythm through movement is an important theme in Skye's works; he has collaborated with choreographers such as Yeko Ladzekpo-Cole, Mariel McEwan, Sheetal Gandhi, Cynthia Ling Lee, Rukhmani Mehta and Seibi Lee of the Leela Dance Collective and synchronized swimming champion and international coach Sue Baross Nesbitt. He was awarded a residency with the Los Angeles Chamber Orchestra (LACO) through New Music USA's "Music Alive" program for LACO's 2015–2016 season and has released three albums, Prisms, Cycles, Leaps (2015) and American Mirror (2018), with Orenda Records and This Place (2023) with Artistician. In 2021, Skye was selected by the Washington Post for the "21 for '21: Composers and performers who sound like tomorrow" article by Michael Andor Brodeur. Skye was also awarded the Prince Grace Honoraria in the Theatre category for his work "Mother of Bravery" with Los Angeles Chamber Orchestra and "Best New Composition" in the San Francisco Classical Voice Audience Choice Awards for his work "Mind the Rhythm" for violin and electronics.

Skye has given talks, workshops, and pre-concert lectures about his musical practices at the Harvard University Barwick Colloquium, Homeland Cultural Center, Skirball Cultural Center, Royce Hall (UCLA), Alex Theatre, Los Angeles County Museum of Art, and various other schools and institutions. He was asked to speak at the 2016 annual League of American Orchestras conference in Baltimore on the topic of how classical music orchestras can build stronger relationships with their diverse communities. In 2019, Skye was a panelist for "New Voices: Composers of Today" at the League of American Orchestras conference together with Daniel Bernard Roumain, Alex Temple, Evan Williams, Jennifer Jolley. In 2023, Skye was invited to be a panelist at the American Society for Composers, Authors and Publishers (ASCAP) Artificial Intelligence Symposium. His electroacoustic collaborative AI opera "Song of the Ambassadors" was featured in the opening ceremonies of TED (conference) 2023, in Vancouver, BC.

Skye is the artistic director of the chamber ensemble and arts organization Bridge to Everywhere. He is Artistic Advisor and Composer for Los Angeles Chamber Orchestra. He is also a part of the UpBeat Live series with the Los Angeles Philharmonic, composer mentor for Pacific Symphony Youth Orchestra, and Director of Instrumental Ensembles at Mount Saint Mary’s University, Los Angeles. He is a member of the New Music USA Program Council and a board member of the American Composers Forum.

During the week of Juneteenth 2021, Skye formally changed his name from Derrick Spiva Jr to Derrick Senam Eugene Skye, which was featured in a Los Angeles Times article. Skye is the son of Artra Howard-Brant, and nephew of Mattina Howard, Sherri Howard and Denean Howard of the Howard Sisters who won gold and silver medals in track and field at the 1984 (Los Angeles) and 1988 (Seoul) Olympic games. His father, Derrick Spiva Sr, is a lecturer at San Francisco State University in Africana Studies. He is married to ethnomusicologist Kim Nguyen Tran.

== List of works ==
=== Opera ===
- 2022 "Song of the Ambassadors" (electro-acoustic, collaborative artificial intelligence)

=== Orchestra ===
- 2003 "Lithe Melodies"
- 2005 "Gaea" Saxophone Concerto
- 2007 "Vicissitude Variations"
- 2011 "Our Being Whole"
- 2014 "Prisms, Cycles, Leaps" (Part I of the Prisms, Cycles, Leaps Suite)
- 2018 "From Here a Path" (Part II of the Prisms, Cycles, Leaps Suite)
- 2019 "To Be A Horizon" (Part III of the Prisms, Cycles, Leaps Suite)
- 2020 "Like Water, Freedom”
- 2021 "Neither Separated Nor Undone" (Part 6 of "Anthems of a Crowd") for SATB choir and orchestra.
- 2021 "Flames Nurtured the Rose"
- 2022 "Penta"
- 2022 "A Rage of Peace" for orchestra and soprano.
- 2022 "We Gather" for orchestra and electronics.
- 2023 "Nova Plexus" for orchestra, electric guitar and synthesizer.
- 2023 "To Seek is Jubilance" for orchestra and SATB soloists.*
- 2024 "American Mirror" for string orchestra.

=== Wind ensemble ===
- 2000 "Apollo's Prayer"
- 2002 "Apollo's Prayer Reprise"
- 2004 "Seraph's Reflection"
- 2012 "In Our Hands a Canvas" for Wind Ensemble, Women's Choir, Organ, Electric Guitar.
- 2020 “CodeSwitch Mixtape” (co-commission with Conor Abbott Brown) for Wind Ensemble and Electronics.
- 2022 “End of Beginning” for Wind Ensemble, Electronics, Electric Guitar.

=== Choral ===
- 2005 "Posledna Ljubov" (Last Love) for Bulgarian Women's Choir.
- 2007 "Malka Moma Tsvete Brala" for Bulgarian Women's Choir.
- 2008 "Prozorets" (The Window) for Bulgarian Women's Choir.
- 2010 "Tzvetina Dusha, Vahdat, Davam" for Tar, Daf, Persian Vocals, Bulgarian Women's Choir, Ney.
- 2017 "A Vision Unfolding" (Part 1 of "Anthems of a Crowd) for SATB choir.
- 2019 "Ready Bright" (Part 4 of "Anthems of a Crowd") for SATB choir.
- 2021 "Glimpse Elation" (Part 5 of "Anthems of a Crowd) for SATB choir.
- 2021 "Neither Separated Nor Undone" (Part 6 of "Anthems of a Crowd") for SATB choir and orchestra.
- 2022 "Black Ocean" (Part 7 of "Anthems of a Crowd") for SATB choir and string quartet.
- 2023 "But, We Press On" (co-commission with Ellen Goth) for children’s choir and piano.
- 2023 "All Becomes the Infinite" for SATB choir and electronics.

=== Chamber music ===
- 2002 "Miles of Sun" for violin, flute, bassoon, piano.
- 2003 "3 Queens"* electro-acoustic music sound design.
- 2003 "September" for flute, oboe, 2 bassoons, marimba, piano, mezzo-soprano, violin, viola, 3 cellos, contrabass.
- 2003 "Red Dress" for flute, oboe, 2 bassoons, marimba, piano, violin, viola, 3 cellos, contrabass.
- 2003 "Mother's Day" for flute, Bb clarinet, 2 violins, viola, 3 cellos, contrabass, piano, oboe, soprano saxophone, bassoon, marimba, mezzo-soprano.
- 2004 "Ciaccona Blue"* for 2 alto saxophones, piano, harp, marimba.
- 2004 "Ciaccona Red" for soprano saxophone, Bb trumpet, harp, piano.
- 2004 "Dunes"* for solo trombone and string orchestra.
- 2004 "Alacrity" for flute, Bb clarinet, 2 tabla, vibes, oboe, bass clarinet, F-horn.
- 2005 "Crystal Black" for 3 hands piano, trombone, tenor sax, vibes, percussion.
- 2005 "Curious Dances" for flute, Bb clarinet, harp, bassoon, piano, F-horn.
- 2005 "Liquescent" for flute, harp, violin, piano, bass, hand clap.
- 2005 "Vicissitude" for flute, Bb clarinet, harp, 2 violins, 3 violas, 2 solo Bulgarian female voices, harp, bass, 3 cellos, oboe.
- 2005 "ko-Ig'zist" for flute, harmonium, violin, acoustic guitar, double bass, tambourine, drum set, hand percussion Bb trumpet, rapper.
- 2005 "Twenty-Seven" for trumpet, piano, tabla, electronics.
- 2006 "She Cried" for cello, oboe, violin, horn, tampura drone.
- 2006 "Script 44" for trombone, alto sax, Bb clarinet, drum set, bass.
- 2006 "Assertion" for brass quintet.
- 2007 "Atsia Derivare" for Ewe drum orchestra.
- 2007 "In Silver" for flute, oboe, clarinet, bassoon, violoncello, double bass.
- 2007 "Red 4" for flute, oboe, Bb clarinet, bassoon.
- 2008 "The Leaf" for 6 or more flutes.
- 2012 "Neuron Speak" for Los Angeles Electric 8- electric mandolin, electric baritone guitar, tap guitar, electric bass guitar, and four electric guitars.
- 2013 "forming-idioms, mental objects" for woodwind quintet, violins, viola, guitar, contrabass, percussion and piano.
- 2016 "From Here a Path" (Part II of Prisms, Cycles, Leaps Suite) for small chamber ensemble.
- 2016 "Unveiled this Heart" for small chamber ensemble.
- 2017 "From Here a Path (Revised)" (Part II of Prisms, Cycles, Leaps Suite) for small chamber ensemble.
- 2018 "Seven Turns" for chamber ensemble.
- 2019 "In Sight of Atsia" for chamber ensemble.
- 2020 "Mother of Bravery" for chamber ensemble.
- 2020 "From Embers" for chamber ensemble.
- 2022 "We Begin" for chamber ensemble.
- 2024 "Alluvion" for chamber ensemble.

=== String Quartet ===
- 2017 "American Mirror" for string quartet.
- 2019 "As I Heard When I Was Young" for string quartet and double bass.
- 2023 "Deliverance" for string quartet.

=== Duets and trios ===
- 2005 "Catena" F-horn, piano.
- 2006 "We Spoke"* for violin, ney, and vibraphone.
- 2007 "Dragon" 3 Bb clarinets and tampura.
- 2008 "Young Orsiris Young Seth" for 2 alto saxophones.
- 2008 "Orsiris, Seth & Horus" for Bb clarinet, oboe, flute.
- 2009 "Dies Veneris" for harp trio.
- 2010 "Quote from a Dream" tar, daf, Persian vocals.
- 2013 "Granular Waves" for saxophone and piano.
- 2016 "Crossing" for harp trio.
- 2020 "Mind the Rhythm" for violin, electronics, and percussion.
- 2020 "Yea, We Talked About It" for piano and accordion.
- 2022 "Pulse Equilibria" for violin, flute, oboe, and electronics.
- 2022 "In Thy Presence, I Melt Them All Away" for cello and piano.

=== Solos ===
- 2020 "Hum" for violin, viola, or cello.
- 2020 "Chroma Fife and Move" for flute with optional percussion.
- 2021 "Woven Gesture Flow" for piano.
- 2022 "Old Soul Different Body" for viola and electronics.
- 2022 "Harp Hymnal" for harp and electronics.
- 2022 "god of the gaps" for violin and electronics.

=== Music for choreography ===
- 2005 "Ending After"
- 2005 "Rebecca's Piece"
- 2006 "Exertion" for Marshall Dance Company
- 2006 "Strength" for Eboni Dance Company
- 2007 "Sara's Parapluie"
- 2007 "Long for the Beginning" for tabla, cello, tampura.
- 2009 "Rupture"
- 2010 "Shapes of Recovery" for Kingsley Irons Trio
- 2010 "Speaking Voice"* for Ewe drum orchestra
- 2011 "Imaginary Friends" for DancesMadetoOrder.com
- 2011 "Sanctuary" for DancesMadetoOrder.com
- 2011 "Love" Kingsley Irons dance trio for Blankenship Ballet
- 2011 "Hello?" for DancesMadetoOrder.com
- 2012 "Morning Light" for DancesMadetoOrder.com
- 2012 "SuperFine" for DancesMadetoOrder.com
- 2012 "Grain" duduk, low D tin-whistle, piano. for DancesMadetoOrder.com
- 2012 "Convergence" for DancesMadetoOrder.com
- 2012 "I have something to tell you" for In/Ex Dance Project
- 2013 "Super Ruwaxi: Origins (Revised)" for Cynthia Ling Lee
- 2013 "Luck, Hope, and Semi-Madness" for In/Ex Dance Project
- 2015 "I Was Just..." and "In|Expiration" for Sheetal Gandhi and Ulka Mohanty
- 2017 "Stuck" for Sheetal Gandhi

=== Music for synchronized swimmers ===
- 2007 "Cottle's Liquescent Crystal" for FoCA (Friends of CalArts) Fundraising Event
- 2008 "Seven Sins" for Ohio State University Synchronized Swim
- 2008 "Nesbitt Solo" for Ohio State University Synchronized Swim Team
- 2010 "Ascension" for Ohio State University Synchronized Swim Team
- 2011 "Liquescent Crystal 2" for FoCA (Friends of CalArts) Fundraising Event
- 2013 "From the Dark" solo routine

=== Film ===
- 2007 "Wind Runner"
- 2007 "Elisabeth"
- 2007 "Women"
- 2007 "Unbridle"
- 2008 "How it all Began"
- 2008 "Vine"
- 2009 "The Layabouts"
- 2009 "Against the Dark Of Night"
- 2010 "Imaginary"
- 2016 "The President of Malawi"
- 2016 "Last Man Standing"
- 2016 "Parched"
- 2020 "Fighting for Family"
- 2021 "Cambodia Town Not for Sale"
