= Ed Bennett =

Irish composer

- Born: 15 March 1975 (age 50); Belfast, Northern Ireland
- Genres: Minimalism, Classical, Contemporary classical, Ambient
- Occupation: Composer
- Years active: 1999–present
- Labels: Quartz Records, NMC Recordings
- Website: edbennett.co.uk

Ed Bennett (born 15 March 1975) is a composer of contemporary art music.

== Biography ==
Bennett was born in Bangor, County Down, Northern Ireland. Having studied with Brian Irvine at North Down College and with Michael Finnissy at the Guildhall School of Music and Drama, London, Bennett states that "Striving for perfection leads me to boredom. I like to be surprised by music, staying on the outside of things and occasionally dipping in and taking what I need to try to create something new." He has also worked with Heiner Goebbels during his residency in Birmingham Conservatoire.

In 2007 he was a finalist in the British Composer Awards. He has had works performed by RTÉ, BBC, Moving on Music, 2012 Olympics, PRSF, Music Network, Integra and the arts councils of England, Ireland and Northern Ireland.

Bennett's work has been commissioned and performed internationally by many different artists, organisations and ensembles including the PRSF, BBC, RTÉ, Moving on Music, Music Network and the arts councils of Ireland, Northern Ireland and England. Listed among the collaborators and performers of his work are RTÉ National Symphony Orchestra of Ireland, Ulster Orchestra, BBC Symphony Orchestra, BBC Philharmonic Orchestra, National Orchestra of Belgium, London Sinfonietta, Concorde, Fidelio Trio, Berlin Percussion Ensemble, Smith Quartet, Crash Ensemble, Orkest de ereprijs, Ensemble SurPlus, Lontano, Noszferatu, Ensemble Ars Nova, Garth Knox, Pedro Carneiro, Reinbert de Leeuw, James MacMillan, Darragh Morgan, Mary Dullea, Rolf Hind, Paul Dunmall and Heiner Goebbels. He also performs with and directs his own ensemble, Decibel.

In 2012 he was awarded the Philip Leverhulme Prize for the Performing Arts. In the same year, he was commissioned to write a piece for the Northern Irish "Opera Shorts" series, which was performed in Belfast and in London as part of the Olympics Festival. It was credited in The Irish Times as being a memorable highlight and was mentioned in The Guardian for its playfulness.

He is currently at Birmingham Conservatoire where he is the recipient of a research fellowship and active as a teacher in the composition department.

== Discography ==
- Dzama Stories – Music influenced by artist Marcel Dzama, Quartz
- My Broken Machines (NMC Recordings)
- Togetherness (Diatribe Records)
- Contemporary Music from Ireland, Volume 10 – An appearance on the best of Irish composers' of Northern Ireland
- Between (Diatribe Recordings)
- Music From Northern Ireland (Lontano Records)
