= Jordan Randall Smith =

- Born: November 18, 1982 (age 43); Dallas, Texas
- Education: Peabody Institute, Texas Tech University
- Musical career
- Genres: Classical, Contemporary Classical
- Occupation: Conductor
- Instruments: Percussion
- Label: SNOtone
- Member of: Symphony Number One
- Website: www.jordanrsmith.com

Jordan Randall Smith (born November 18, 1982) is an American conductor, arts entrepreneur, and percussionist. He is the music director of Symphony Number One and conductor of the Hopkins Concert Orchestra at Johns Hopkins University. He was also a Visiting assistant professor of Music and Director of Orchestra at Susquehanna University.

== Early life and career ==
Smith was born in Dallas to professional musician parents: His father was a choir director and his mother was a pianist. He pursued percussion beginning at Mesquite High School. Smith developed a substantial interest in 20th and 21st century repertoire for chamber orchestra during his graduate studies, where he programmed Schoenberg's 3 Pieces for Chamber Orchestra of 1910. Smith has also worked as a music educator for a number of years across several different roles including the public schools. After studies at Texas Tech University, Smith was accepted to the Peabody Institute where he studied with Gustav Meier, Markand Thakar, and Marin Alsop. He has guest conducted a number of ensembles and orchestras in public performances including the East Texas Symphony Orchestra, York Symphony Orchestra, and Alia Musica Pittsburgh.

== Dallas Festival of Modern Music ==
In 2009, Smith co-founded the Dallas festival of Modern Music with colleague Ryan Ross. DFMM served the Dallas community with music from 2009 to 2011, opening its first season with the music of Schoenberg. In its second year, the festival expanded to a full ten days of concerts, recitals, and educational programs. The second season included a number of prominent guest artists including Christopher Deane and Paul Rennick. DFMM was recognized for innovative programming and original presentations, receiving a TACA grant.

== Symphony Number One ==
In September 2014, Smith began laying the groundwork for a chamber orchestra in Baltimore. In May 2015, Symphony Number One made its debut at the Baltimore War Memorial. As music director of Symphony Number One, Smith was selected as a 2016 Baltimore Social Innovation Fellow. Symphony Number One has garnered several awards including 2019 Winner of The American Prize in Orchestral Performance. Smith also received 2nd Place in the 2019 American Prize competition in the conducting division.

== Other Activity ==
External videos
- Smith's TED Talk, "Classical Music is Boring", TED video

In April 2018, Smith assumed duties as music director at Hunt's Memorial United Methodist Church in Towson, Maryland. Smith was formerly the music director of Govans Presbyterian Church in Baltimore.

Smith has recorded a number of albums and EP's. He founded SNOtone Records as a boutique label for the production of the music of Symphony Number One. Smith previously self-released two titles.

Smith occasionally contributes to the magazine Baltimore and the weblog Sequenza21. While not a published scholar, some of Smith's academic writings have been cited in published works. More recently, Smith has become involved in work to share information on the music of composer Florence Price. This has led to the inception of the International Florence Price Festival, planned for launch in 2020.

In October 2017, Smith gave a "TED talk," speaking at TEDxMidAtlantic 2017 to positive reviews.

== Discography ==
- 2017: Approaching: Martha Horst: Straussian Landscapes; Hangrui Zhang: Baltimore Prelude; Nicholas Bentz: Approaching Eternity. (SNOtone)
- 2016: More: Natalie Draper: Timelapse Variations; Jonathan Russell: Light Cathedral; Andrew Posner: The Promised Burning. (SNOtone)
- 2016: Emergence: Andrew M. Boss: Concerto for Saxophone and Small Chamber Orchestra, feat. Sean Meyers - alto saxophone. (SNOtone)
- 2015: Symphony Number One: Wolfgang Amadeus Mozart: Concerto for Flute, Harp, and Orchestra (Mozart), feat. Raoul Cho, Jordan Thomas; Gabriel Fauré: Pavane; Mark Fromm: Symphony No. 1, feat. Hanul Park – bassoon. (SNOtone)
- 2014: Rhapsody: Music for Cello and Orchestra: Andrew M. Boss: Concerto for Cello and Orchestra, feat. Dmitri Volkov - cello. (Self-Produced)
- 2013: “Pierrot Lunaire”: Arnold Schoenberg: Pierrot Lunaire, feat. Jessica Abel, sprechstimme. (Self-Produced)
