= SNOtone =

Recording Label by Symphony Number One

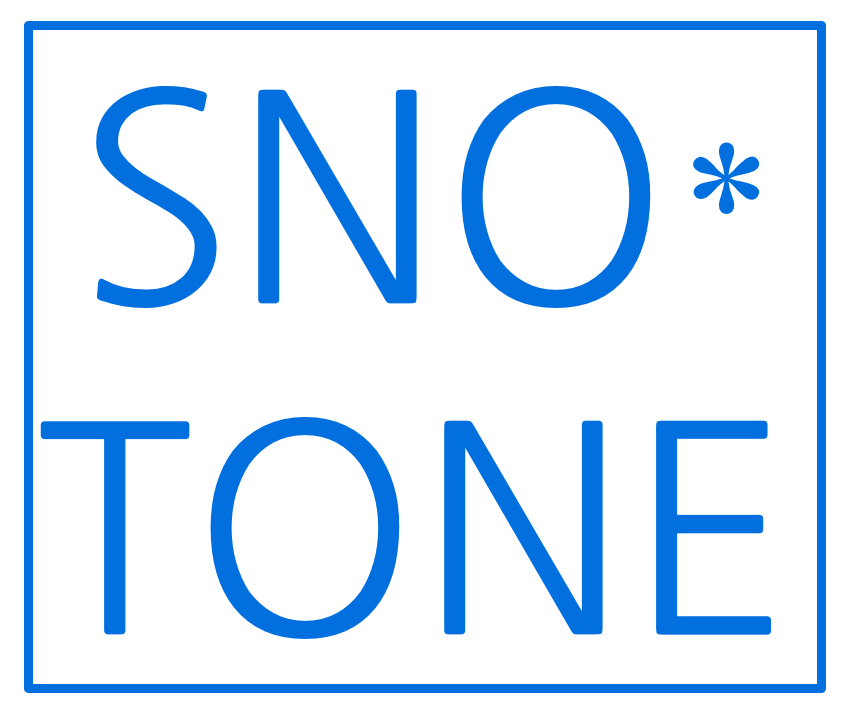
- Parent company: Symphony Number One
- Founded: 2015
- Founder: Jordan Randall Smith
- Genre: Classical, contemporary classical
- Country of origin: US
- Location: Baltimore, Maryland
- Official website: www.snotone.com

SNOtone is an independent record label founded in Baltimore, Maryland, in 2015 by Jordan Randall Smith. The label's catalogue is devoted to classical and contemporary classical music.

SNOtone is a custom imprint for recordings by Symphony Number One with plans to expand to other contemporary classical projects.

== Catalogue ==
- ST04 (2017): Approaching: Symphony Number One, Jordan Randall Smith, conductor. Martha Horst: Straussian Landscapes; Hangrui Zhang: Baltimore Prelude; Nicholas Bentz: Approaching Eternity.

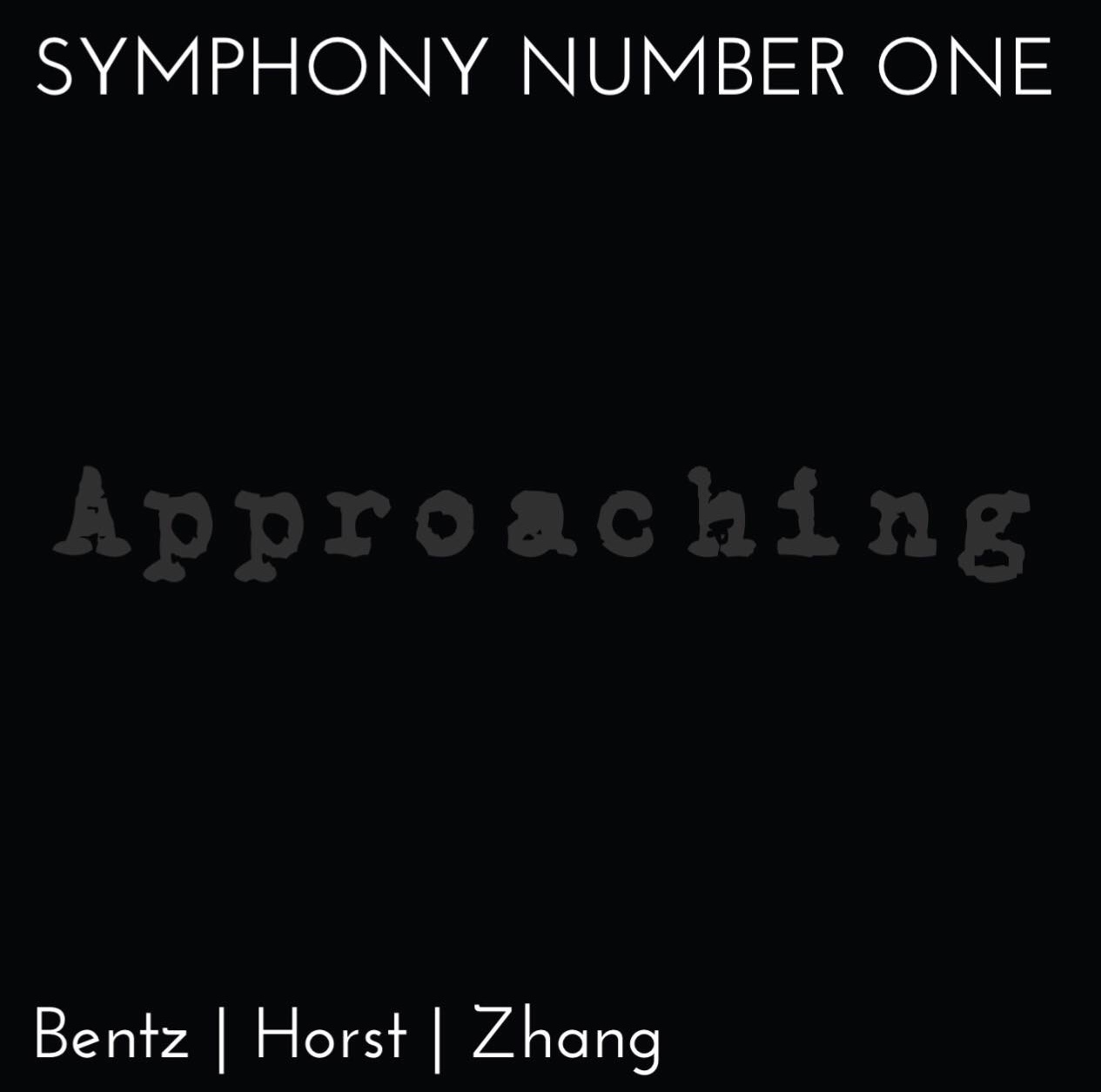
Cover art for Approaching

- ST03 (2016): More: Symphony Number One, Jordan Randall Smith, conductor. Natalie Draper: Timelapse Variations; Jonathan Russell: Light Cathedral; Andrew Posner: The Promised Burning.
- ST02 (2016): Emergence: Symphony Number One, Jordan Randall Smith, conductor. Andrew Boss: Concerto for Saxophone and Small Chamber Orchestra, feat. Sean Meyers - alto saxophone.
- ST01 (2015): Symphony Number One: Symphony Number One, Jordan Randall Smith, conductor. Wolfgang Amadeus Mozart: Concerto for Flute, Harp, and Orchestra, feat. Raoul Cho, Jordan Thomas; Gabriel Fauré: Pavane; Mark Fromm: Symphony No. 1, feat. Hanul Park - bassoon.
