= Symphony Number One =

Chamber orchestra in Baltimore, Maryland, US

- Orchestra
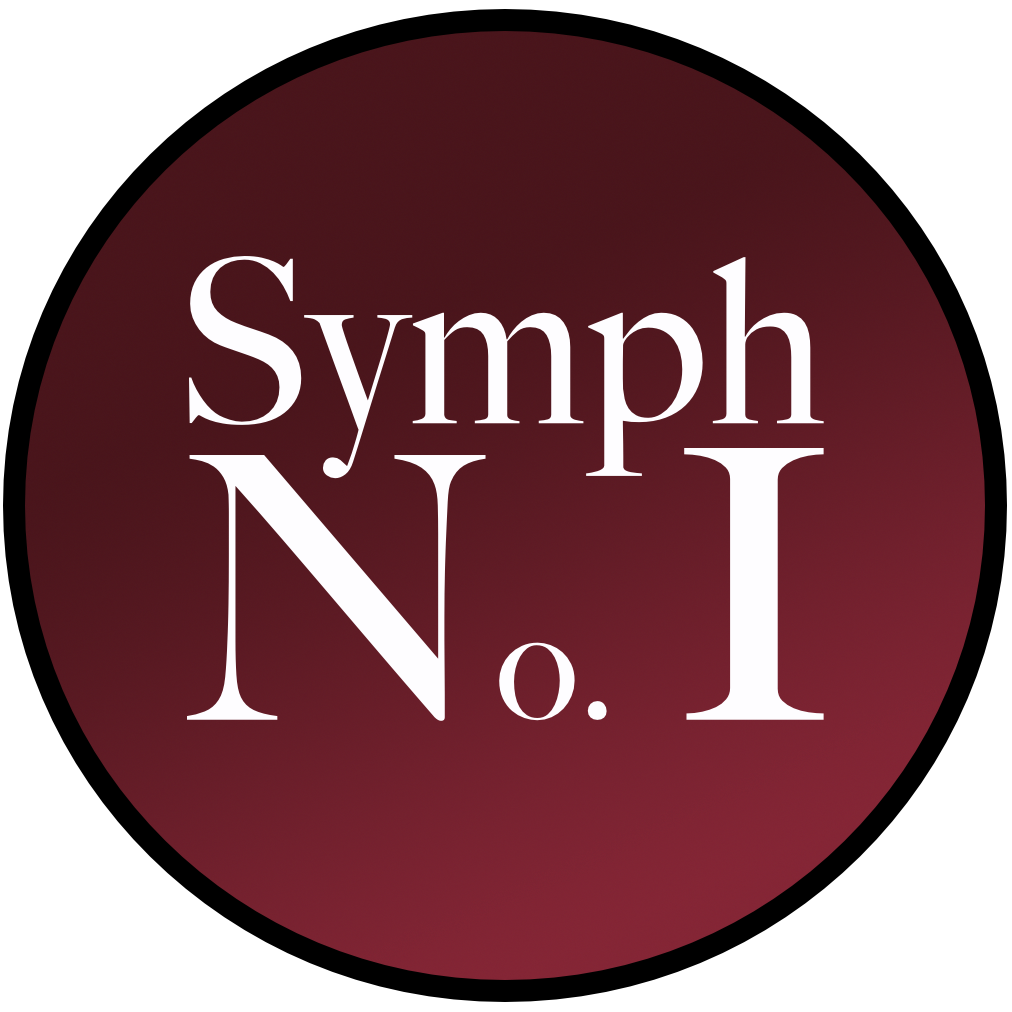
- Short name: SNO
- Founded: 2015
- Location: Baltimore, Maryland, US
- Concert hall: Baltimore War Memorial; Emmanuel Episcopal Church; Lovely Lane Methodist Church; Morgan State University
- Principal conductor: Jordan Randall Smith
- Website: symphonynumber.one

Symphony Number One (SNO) is a chamber orchestra primarily devoted to new music based in Baltimore, Maryland. SNO performs each year in musical venues in Mount Vernon, Baltimore, at Morgan State University, and across the city. Jordan Randall Smith is Symphony Number One's founder and current music director.

== History ==
Symphony Number One was founded in 2015 by Jordan Randall Smith, Nicholas Bentz, and Sean Meyers, all of whom were graduate and undergraduate students at the Peabody Institute. Symphony Number One is a chamber orchestra devoted to performing works by emerging composers. A non-profit performing arts organization, SNO maintains close relationships with the other independent classical music organizations of Baltimore, and is a part of Maryland's classical arts space. With its focus on contemporary music, SNO can also be classified as a contemporary classical ensemble.

The orchestra's president is Dr. Janan Broadbent and Ben Goldberg is SNO's composer-in-residence. The orchestra's current concertmaster is Nikita Borisevich. Founder Jordan Randall Smith and co-founder Nicholas Bentz are current members of the collective. The other co-founder was saxophonist Sean Meyers; Smith, Bentz, and Meyers first met at the Peabody Institute. The three put together the inaugural concert in May 2015 at the Baltimore War Memorial. In 2017, SNO appointed Brian Tracey as executive director.

SNO was invited to perform at the inaugural Light City festival on April 2, 2016, in Baltimore. In September 2016, Symphony Number One began its second season with compositions by Richard Strauss, Mahler, and Steve Reich. SNO was named a "Category Buster" by Baltimore Magazine in their 2016 "Best of Baltimore" issue; SNO also won runner up for "Best Band" in Baltimore Magazine's Reader's Poll. In addition, SNO was featured in I Care if You Listen's Mixtape #20.

Symphony Number One emphasizes inclusionary policies in orchestra membership, audience access, and selection of featured composers. SNO is a two-time recipient of grants by Women's Philharmonic Advocacy for multiple commissions of female composers.

SNO is the 2019 winner of The American Prize in Orchestral Performance.

== Repertoire ==
=== Notable premieres ===
Symphony Number One's cornerstone project is the commissioning of new works. SNO has commissioned several works from American and international composers, which include:

- Kirsten Broberg: In Search of Imagery (2020)
- James Lee III: Chamber Symphony: Awakened to Eternal Realities (2018)
- Carolyn Chen: Animalcules (2017)
- Nicholas Bentz: Approaching Eternity (2017)
- Natalie Draper: Timelapse Variations (2016)
- Martha Horst: Straussian Landscapes (2016)
- Andrew Posner: The Promised Burning (2016)
- Jonathan Russell: Light Cathedral (2016)
- Nicole Murphy: Water Mirrors (2015)
- Andrew Boss: Saxophone Concerto, written for saxophonist Sean Meyers (2015)
- Mark Fromm: Symphony No. 1 (2015)

=== Masterworks ===
- John Adams: Son of Chamber Symphony
- Pierre Boulez: Dérive 2
- Anton Bruckner: Symphony No. 7
- Antonín Dvořák: Serenade No. 2
- Charles Ives: Symphony No. 3
- Gustav Mahler: Symphony No. 4; Das Lied von der Erde
- Wolfgang Amadeus Mozart: Concerto for Flute, Harp, and Orchestra
- Arnold Schoenberg: Chamber Symphony No. 1
- Richard Strauss: Sonatine No. 2
- Igor Stravinsky: L'Histoire du soldat

=== Crossover ===
- Dan Deacon: "When I Was Done Dying"
- Lady Gaga: "Poker Face"
- Leonard Cohen: "Hallelujah"
- Martina Lynch: "Dear Media"
- Radiohead: "Pyramid Song"

== Music directors ==
- Jordan Randall Smith (2015–present)

== Members ==
SNO is a flexible collective of approximately thirty artist-entrepreneurs, including instrumentalists, vocalists, composers, and sound and production designers. The musicians also serve as the executive and operational leadership.

- Guilherme Andreas (flute)
- James Duncan (clarinet)
- Scott Johnson Jr. (bass clarinet)
- Mateen Milan (bassoon)
- Susan Summers (saxophone)
- Scott Ullman (horn)
- Andy Ezell (trumpet)
- Sarah Manley (trombone)
- Matt Stiens (percussion)
- Elizabeth G. Hill (piano)
- Dan Rorke (keyboard)
- Nikita Borisevich (violin)
- Keegan Donlon (viola)
- Mike Newman (cello)
- Michael Rittling (double bass)
- Ben Goldberg (composer in residence)
- Jordan Randall Smith (conductor)

== Performances and tours ==
=== SNO on the Road ===
SNO offers small tours concerts called "SNO on the Road". In February 2016, members Sean Meyers and Elizabeth G. Hill used the series to present saxophone and piano recitals in which the piano reduction of the Andrew Boss Saxophone Concerto was premiered, their second album–Emergence–was released, and the sheet music for the concerto went on sale.

More recently, Symphony Number One performed at TEDxMidAtlantic 2017 in Washington, D.C.

== Community outreach ==
SNO offers several programs to engage with a variety of audiences in Baltimore as well as to work with composers internationally.

=== Beethoven's Kitchen ===
In May 2016, Melissa Lander presented SNO's first significant chamber music concert under the umbrella of "Beethoven's Kitchen". The series focuses both on new music and concert experiences and on combining food and drink.

=== Call for Scores ===
SNO holds an annual Call for Scores competition, recognizing two winners each year. The winning composers are commissioned to write new works for Symphony Number One. In its third call for scores, Symphony Number One added a number of additional prizes, including the "Maryland Prize," recognizing a Maryland composer's achievements. Howard County native Karena Ingram was the winner.

== Broadcasts ==
- WYPR's Midday: Performance broadcast across the State of Maryland. Hosted by Tom Hall.
- Maryland Public Television's Artworks: Performance broadcast across the State of Maryland. Hosted by Rhea Feikin.
- The Baltimore Sun's Roughly Speaking: Performance broadcast live from the lobby of The Baltimore Sun. Hosted by Dan Rodricks.
- KALW's Music from Other Minds: Radio broadcast featuring SNO's third album, More. Hosted by Danny Clay.

== Discography ==
SNO emphasizes recordings as an integral component of its program. In addition to freely releasing live performances of individual compositions, SNO records albums on its own custom label, SNOtone.

- 2017: Approaching: Martha Horst: Straussian Landscapes ; Hangrui Zhang: Baltimore Prelude ; Nicholas Bentz: Approaching Eternity. (SNOtone)
- 2016: More: Natalie Draper: Timelapse Variations; Jonathan Russell: Light Cathedral; Andrew Posner: The Promised Burning. (SNOtone)
- 2016: Emergence: Andrew Boss: Concerto for Saxophone and Small Chamber Orchestra, feat. Sean Meyers – alto saxophone. (SNOtone)
- 2015: Symphony Number One: Wolfgang Amadeus Mozart: Concerto for Flute, Harp, and Orchestra, feat. Raoul Cho, Jordan Thomas; Gabriel Fauré: Pavane; Mark Fromm: Symphony No. 1, feat. Hanul Park – bassoon. (SNOtone)
