= Symphony Number One (album) =

Live album by Symphony Number One and Jordan Randall Smith
- Released: November 13, 2015
- Recorded: May 4–8, 2015
- Venues: Baltimore War Memorial, Baltimore, Maryland
- Genre: Contemporary classical
- Length: 66:23
- Label: SNOtone
- Producers: Dan Rorke; Jordan Randall Smith

Symphony Number One chronology
Symphony Number One (2015)	Emergence (2016)

Symphony Number One is the debut album by Baltimore chamber orchestra Symphony Number One. The album was released in November 2015 to positive reviews. Composer Mark Fromm's offered the eponymous Symphony No. 1, the first commission by the orchestra. Fromm, a bassoonist, opens the work with an extended bassoon solo.

The recording was made during Symphony Number One's debut concert at the Baltimore War Memorial.

== Track listing ==
No.	Title	Music	Length
1.	"Concerto for Flute and Harp, KV 299: I. Allegro"	Mozart	10:10
2.	"Concerto for Flute and Harp, KV 299: II. Andantino"	Mozart	8:35
3.	"Concerto for Flute and Harp, KV 299: III. Rondaeu: Allegro"	Mozart	9:37
4.	"Pavane"	Gabriel Fauré	6:22
5.	"Symphony No. 1"	Mark Fromm	31:39
Total length:			66:23

== Personnel ==
Symphony Number One

- Raoul Cho – flute
- Nicholas Fitton – flute
- Elizabeth Honeyman – oboe
- Emily D’Avella – oboe
- James Duncan – clarinet
- Melissa Johnson Lander – clarinet
- Hanul Park – bassoon
- Mark Fromm – bassoon
- Kelsey Ross – horn
- Sze Fong Yeong – French horn
- Jordan Thomas – harp
- Nicholas Bentz – violin
- Christopher Ciampoli – violin
- Ji Hee Cha – violin
- Madison Van de Wetering – violin
- Shannon Fitzhenry – violin
- Kate Brynildsen – violin
- Maitreyi Muralidharan – violin
- Elizabeth Keckeisen – viola
- Claudia Malchow – viola
- Bronwyn Kure – viola
- Najette Abouelhadi – cello
- Dorian Valérian – cello
- Sam Brown – Double bass
- Jordan Randall Smith – conductor

Soloists

- Raoul Cho – flute (tracks 1–4)
- Hanul Park – bassoon (track 5)
- Jordan Thomas – harp (tracks 1–4)
