= Spiva =

Spiva is a surname. Notable people with the surname include:

- Andy Spiva (1955–1979), American football player
- Derrick Spiva (born 1982), American conductor, composer, musician, and teacher
- Tam Spiva (1932–2017), American television screenwriter
