= Edmund Welles =

- Origin: Oakland
- Instrument: Bass Clarinet
- Years active: 1999-2015
- Members: Cornelius Boots; Jonathan Russell; Jeff Anderle; Aaron Novik
- Website: http://www.edmundwelles.com

Edmund Welles (full name Edmund Welles: The Bass Clarinet Quartet) was an American bass clarinet quartet from Oakland, California. Its members were Cornelius Boots, Jonathan Russell, Jeff Anderle, and Aaron Novik, playing what the group refers to as "heavy chamber music." The group performed many different genres of music, including avant-garde, gospel, jazz, and heavy metal. They have performed cover versions of songs by such groups as Radiohead, Primus, Black Sabbath, The Residents, Iron Maiden and Spinal Tap, as well as approximately 50 original compositions.

== History ==
In 1996, Boots developed the concept for Edmund Welles, and began arranging and composing for it. Some of the group's compositions were an outgrowth of repertoire of Magnesium, a power trio in which Boots had played "robot bass clarinet," a specially modified bass clarinet played with amplification and effects, and performing a bass role.

Edmund Welles's first performance took place in 1999. The group's first CD, Agrippa's 3 Books, which was made possible by a grant from Chamber Music America, was released in August 2005. Their second album, Tooth & Claw, came out in 2007. Tooth & Claw has a companion CD-ROM which contains archival versions of four of the group's songs, 69 pages of music notation for the CD's 12 songs, eight brief instructional videos, and nine drum machine click track recordings to practice with.

The group was effectively dissolved in 2015 when Boots retired from bass clarinet.

== Discography ==
Full releases

- Agrippa's 3 Books (2005)
- Tooth & Claw (2007)
- Imagination Lost (2011)
- Hymns for Christmas (2012)

Demo albums

- Gods Help Us All (1999)
- O Mysterium (1999)

Live albums

- Live at Old First Church in San Francisco, CA. October 6, 2006 (2017)
