= Jonathan Russell (composer) =

- Genres: Classical
- Occupation: Composer
- Instruments: Bass clarinet; clarinet
- Labels: SNOtone; Innova; EMI; MSR Classics
- Website: http://jonrussellmusic.com

Jonathan Russell (born 1979) is an American composer of classical music, clarinetist, and bass clarinetist. Russell was the founder of the Switchboard Music Festival, which held its 10th anniversary in the summer of 2018. His primary teachers have included Paul Lansky, Barbara White, Steve Mackey, Elinor Armer, and Eric Ewazen.

== Career ==
=== Composer ===
Russell has been commissioned by, worked with, and written for ensembles including the San Francisco Symphony, Prism Quartet, Symphony Number One, Empyrian Ensemble, Wild Rumpus, Woodstock Chamber Orchestra, and the JACK Quartet.

The Imani Winds has a long-term relationship with Mr. Russell through the wind quintets Legacy Commissioning Project, which has led to three large scale arrangements of orchestral works for woodwind quintet.

=== Clarinet and bass clarinet ===
==== Soloist ====
Russell frequently solos as a bass clarinetist, performing his own and other works. Among his own works, he premiered his Sonata for Bass Clarinet and Piano with pianist Kate Campbell which Campbell herself commissioned. Russell's performance of Debussy's Premiere Rhapsody was noted for giving, “increasing energy, leading to a smashingly tangy conclusion from a lurking opening."

==== Sqwonk ====
Along with his partner Jeff Anderle, the bass clarinet duo Sqwonk performed in the San Francisco area. The ensemble has self-released several albums of original music for bass clarinet duo as well as works for small ensemble.

==== Edmund Welles ====
Sqwonk members Anderle and Russell join with Cornelius Boots and Aaron Novik to form quartet Edmund Welles: The Bass Clarinet Quartet which themselves also have their own discography.

== List of works ==
=== Original works ===
- ...and the Beast
- ...in the fir trees: fireflies
- Bass Clarinet Concerto
- Bass Clarinet Double Concerto
- Claremont Suite
- Groove: for Bass Clarinet Solo
- Eleven
- KlezDuo (2005)
- Lament and Frippery
- Light Cathedral
- Octet
- O Cool is the Valley Now
- Rain Has Fallen
- Repetitive Stress
- Sonata for Bass Clarinet and Piano
- String Quartet
- Supra
- Technobabble
- Twelve Bean Groove Machine

=== Arrangements ===
- Rimsky Korsakov: Scheherazade
- Holst: The Planets
- Stravinsky: The Rite of Spring

== Discography ==
More (Symphony Number One)

- Released: 2016
- Format: CD
- Label: SNOtone ST03
- Writers: Jonathan Russell, Andrew Posner, Natalie Draper
- Producer: Dan Rorke, Jordan Randall Smith
- Tracks: “Light Cathedral”, “The Pro used Burning”, “Timelapse Variations”

The Valley Sings: Choral Music by Composers of the Hudson Valley (Kairos)

- Released: 2013
- Format: CD
- Label: MSR Classics
- Writers: Aaron Copland, James Fitzwilliam, Craig Fryer, John B Hedges, Edward Lundergan, Panaiotis, Jonathan Russell, Peter Schickele, Peter Sipple, George Tsontakis, and Shirley Hoffman Warren
- Tracks: "Rain Has Fallen", "O Cool is the Valley Now"

High Art (The Living Earth Show)

- Released: 2013
- Format: CD
- Label: Innova 863
- Writers: Timo Andres, Samuel Carl Adams, Jonathan Russell, Adrian Knight
- Tracks: ”You Broke It, You Bought It”, “Tension Study No. 1”, “Repetitive Stress”, “Family Man”

Stravinsky: Rite of Spring (Imani Winds) (EP)

- Released: 2013
- Format: CD
- Label: EMI
- Writer: Igor Stravinsky
- Tracks: "Rite of Spring"
