= Martha Callison Horst =

American composer

- Education: Stanford University; University of California, Davis; Musical career
- Born: 1967 (age 58–59)
- Genres: Classical
- Occupation: composer
- Labels: Azica, SNOtone

Martha Callison Horst is an American composer. Her music has been performed by Earplay, Alea III, the Empyrean Ensemble, the Fromm Players, Left Coast Ensemble, Dal Niente, Composers, Inc., members of the Scottish Chamber Orchestra, the Chicago Composers Consortium, and Music Beyond Performance: SoundImageSound V. Horst studied composition at Stanford University and the University of California, Davis. She is currently Professor of Composition and Music Theory in the Wonsook Kim College of Fine Arts at Illinois State University. Furthermore, she serves as an Academic Senator representing the College of Fine Arts. In the fall of 2020, she was elected Secretary of the Academic Senate placing her on the Executive Committee with the University administration.

== Partial list of works ==
- Adagio for orchestra
- Cloister Songs
- Cloud Gate
- Creature Studies
- Giant Variations
- Night Songs
- Sonata No. 1 for piano
- Straussian Landscapes
- Threads
- Three Meditations on Van Gogh
- Widening Gyre

== Discography ==
Title	Recording Artist	Album Info	Label
Approaching	Symphony Number One	Released: November 2017; Format: CD; Producer: Dan Rorke, Jordan Randall Smith	SNOtone
Reform: Solo Piano	Laura Downes	Released: 2003; Format: CD	Azica Records
Chamber Music of Women Composers. Volume 1	Left Coast Chamber Ensemble	Released: 1997; Format: Cassette	
