= Emergence (Symphony Number One album) =

Live album by Symphony Number One, Jordan Randall Smith, Sean Meyers, Andrew Boss
- Released: March 4, 2016
- Recorded: September 23–27, 2015 in Baltimore, Maryland
- Venue: Emmanuel Episcopal Church
- Genre: Contemporary classical
- Length: 29:33
- Label: SNOtone
- Producers: Dan Rorke; Jordan Randall Smith (also exec.)

Symphony Number One chronology
| Symphony Number One (2015) | Emergence (2016) | More (2016) |

Emergence is the second release by contemporary classical chamber orchestra Symphony Number One. The album was released on March 4, 2016. An EP, the album has only two tracks totaling less than 30 minutes. The two tracks comprise the two-movement Concerto for Alto Saxophone and Small Chamber Orchestra by Andrew Boss. The concerto was recorded at the season opener of Symphony Number One’s Inaugural Season. The album was recognized on Icareifyoulisten’s Mixtape #20 and twice featured on MPT’s Artworks.

== Track listing ==
All music is composed by Andrew Boss.

| No. | Title | Length |
|---|---|---|
| 1. | "Alto Saxophone Concerto: 1. Prologue and Concertante" | 15:42 |
| 2. | "Alto Saxophone Concerto: 2. Dialogue, Toccata, and Remembrance" | 13:51 |
| Total length: | | 29:33 |

== Personnel ==
Symphony Number One

- Sarah Eckman McIver – flute
- Emily Madsen – oboe
- James Duncan – clarinet
- Melissa Johnson Lander – clarinet
- Kika Wright – bassoon
- Selena Maytum – horn
- Nehemiah Russell – percussion
- Elizabeth G. Hill – piano
- Michelle Rofrano – keyboard
- Nicholas Bentz – violin
- Christopher Ciampoli – violin
- Dorothy Couper – viola
- Joe Isom – cello
- Kassie Ferrero – Double bass
- Jordan Randall Smith – conductor

Additional musicians

- Anna Bross – viola
- Christopher Salvito – percussion

Technical personnel

- Dan Rorke – producer
- Arun Ravendhran – engineer
- Chelsea Clough – photographer (cover)
- Maitreyi Muralidharan – photographer (liner)
