= Approaching =

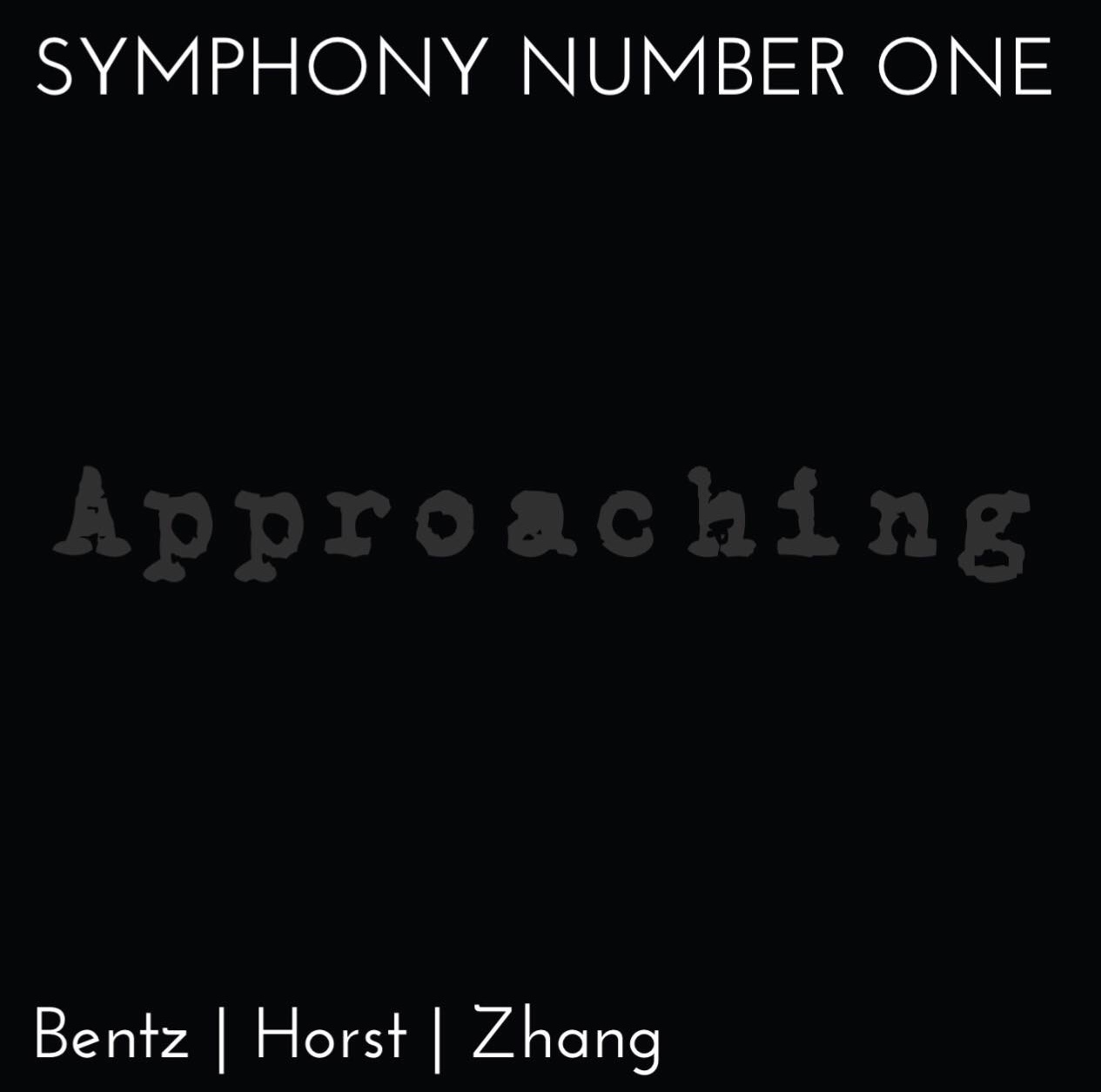

Live album by Symphony Number One, Jordan Randall Smith
- Released: November 3, 2017
- Recorded: September 23, 2016 – August 27, 2017 in Baltimore, Maryland
- Venues: Lovely Lane Methodist Church; Light Street Presbyterian Church; Emmanuel Episcopal Church
- Genre: Contemporary classical
- Length: 79:11
- Label: SNOtone
- Producers: Dan Rorke; Jordan Randall Smith (also exec.)

Symphony Number One chronology
| More (2016) | Approaching |

Approaching is the fourth live album by contemporary classical chamber orchestra Symphony Number One. The album was released on November 3, 2017 and features the music of Nicholas Bentz, Martha Horst, and Hangrui Zhang. The majority of the disk is taken up by Nicholas Bentz’s work Approaching Eternity.

== Track listing ==
| No. | Title | Music | Length |
|---|---|---|---|
| 1. | "Straussian Landscapes" | Martha Horst | 21:56 |
| 2. | "Baltimore Prelude" | Hangrui Zhang | 3:21 |
| 3. | "Approaching Eternity" | Nicholas Bentz | 53:54 |
| Total length: | | | 79:11 |

== Personnel ==
Symphony Number One

- Sarah Eckman McIver – flute
- Garrett Hale – oboe
- Julia Perry – oboe
- James Duncan – clarinet
- Scott Johnson Jr. – clarinet
- Melissa Johnson Lander – clarinet
- Mateen Milan – bassoon
- Kika Wright – bassoon
- Kelso Jones – horn
- Selena Maytum – French horn
- Scott Ullman – French horn
- Andrew Ezell – trumpet
- Sarah Manley – trombone
- Matthew Stiens – percussion
- Elizabeth G. Hill – piano
- Kristin Bakkegard – violin
- Christopher Ciampoli – violin
- Karin Kilper – viola
- Colin Webb – viola
- Mike Newman – cello
- Michael Rittling – Double bass
- Jordan Randall Smith – conductor

Additional musicians

- Drew Dardis – flute
- Cindy Dong – bassoon
- Clifton Guidry III – bassoon
- Juan Carlos Martinez – clarinet
- Juan Esteban Martinez – clarinet
- Jordan Dinkins – French horn
- Noah Tingen – French horn
- Gabriel Luciano – trombone
- Adrienne Knauer – harp
- Minjin Lee – violin
- Phoebe Leng – violin
- Audrey Maxner – violin
- William Weijia Wang – violin
- Trista Wong – violin
- Hangchen Xiao – violin
- Colin Webb – viola
- Robert Kaufman – cello
- Doug Ohashi – Double bass
