= Marco Antonio Mazzini =

Peruvian clarinetist

Marco Antonio Mazzini is a Peruvian clarinetist.

Mazzini received a degree in clarinet from the National Conservatory of Peru, and a master's degree from the Ghent Conservatory. He has performed as a soloist with the Lima Philharmonic Orchestra, Gents Universitair Symfonisch Orkest (Belgium), Camerata Orchestra (Guatemala), Bahia Blanca Symphony Orchestra (Argentina), National Peruvian Youth Orchestra, Artis Dulcedo (Belgium), Philharmonic Orchestra of Costa Rica, Mersin Üniversitesi Akademik oda Orkestrası (Turkey), Guatemala's National Symphony Orchestra, Neuquén Symphony Orchestra (Argentina), Free State Symphony Orchestra (South Africa), MICLA Festival Orchestra (Panama), Antofagasta Symphony Orchestra (Chile) and the National Symphony Orchestra of Peru, and has represented Peru at the World Clarinet Festival. He was the bass clarinetist in the 2009 YouTube Symphony Orchestra. He was also the principal clarinetist of the Ostrava International Orchestra. In 2009 he was invited as a clarinet/bass clarinet performer with the Brussels Philharmonic Orchestra from Belgium, in a concert featuring music by Ligeti and Bartok.

As a recital soloist, concerto soloist, chamber and orchestral musician, he has performed internationally in such prestigious places as Carnegie Hall (New York), Tama Center (Tokio), Paleis voor Schone Kunsten (Brussels), Bijloke Concert Hall (Gent), Gasteig Cultural Center (Germany), FilmMuseum (Amsterdam), Museo de la Nacion (Lima) and the Paris Conservatory. He has also appeared in concert halls in Spain, Luxembourg, Italy, USA, France, Austria, Czech Republic, Germany, Poland, Slovakia, South Africa, Turkey, Thailand, Singapur, Russia, Colombia, Bolivia, Chile, Argentina, Mexico, Brasil, Costa Rica, Uruguay, Ecuador, Panama, Venezuela and Guatemala. He has participated in more than 50 international music festivals.

As a bass clarinetist, he commissioned the "Concerto Silvetre" (2009) to Peruvian composer Rafael Junchaya, premiered in Valladolid with the "Artis Dulcedo orchestra" (Belgium) and later played over 25 times in many countries. On 15 May 2019, he gave the Latin American premier of the bass clarinet concerto "Dr. Livingstone I presume" by composer Bart Piqueur, together with the Peruvian Universidad de Musica's symphonic band conducted by the composer. The "Concierto Latinoamericano para clarinete bajo y banda" by Colombian composer César Cano, was dedicated to him. Mazzini premiered the concerto on 30 October in Bogotá, together with the Universidad Javeriana's symphonic band conducted by Cesar Villamil.

Marco Antonio performs and makes recordings with the contrabass clarinet, an instrument he uses in a variety of music.

He is the founder of the Peruvian Clarinet Orchestra, founder member of Thelema Trio, the Lima Clarinet Ensemble and Kinsa trio. He is also the founder and director of Clariperu, the biggest and most important clarinet organisation in Latin America.

In November 2008 he was awarded with a "Golden Chaski" by the Peruvian Ministry of Education and declared "Hijo Predilecto" of the San Luis city in Lima. He is currently the chairman for Peru and Continental Chairman (South America) for the International Clarinet Association. From 2011 he works as a clarinet and chamber music teacher at the music Faculty of the Pontificia Universidad Católica del Perú (PUCP). In 2015 he won the "Prize for innovation" awarded by the PUCP. Marco Antonio is the first Latin American clarinetist to become a Buffet Crampon Artist (2011) and is also a Vandoren artist (January 2012).
