= Andrew M. Boss =

- Born: 1988 (age 37–38)
- Genres: Classical
- Occupation: composer
- Instrument: piano
- Label: SNOtone
- Website: http://www.andrewboss1.com/

Andrew M. Boss (born 1988) is an American composer. He completed his Doctor of Musical Arts at the University of Texas and his masters at the Peabody Institute of The Johns Hopkins University. His teachers include Dan Welcher, Donald Grantham, Russell Pinkston, Kevin Puts, Daniel Crozier, and Donald Waxman. Boss's work, Tetelestai, was commissioned by Jerry Junkin and the University of Texas Wind ensemble and premiered in November 2014. The work reflects the feelings and emotions behind the birth, death, and resurrection of Jesus Christ. The work has received its Australian premiere by John Lynch and the Sydney Conservatorium of Music Wind Symphony in September 2016.

Another notable work is his Concerto for Alto Saxophone and Small Chamber Orchestra, commissioned by Jordan Randall Smith and Symphony Number One. This work, written for soloist Sean Meyers, was premiered in September 2015 and critically acclaimed by The Baltimore Sun.

His Sonata-Fantasie for Violin and Piano was premiered by the composer and his wife, Yaesolji Shin, at the Florida State Music Teachers Association Conference in Miami, Florida, in October 2017.

Among his other notable works for wind ensemble include Moments of Silence. This work was written for Eddie Smith and dedicated toward the victims of the deadly San Bernardino shooting. It was premiered at the San Bernardino County Music Teachers Association Concert with victims and friends present. His works for winds have received significant attention and repeat performances by wind conductors.

== Partial list of works ==
- À La Machaut
- Concerto for Alto Saxophone and Small Chamber Orchestra
- Divertimento for Piano and Saxophone Quartet
- Moments of Silence: An Elegy for Wind Ensemble
- Sonata-Fantasie for Violin and Piano
- Symphony No. 2
- Tetelestai - A Symphony for Wind Ensemble
- Sound Asleep (A Lullaby for Wind Ensemble - in memory of Vincent Bocchino)
- Fantasy Nocturne and Toccata for Solo Piano
- Concerto for Cello and Orchestra

== Discography ==
- 2016: Emergence: Concerto for Saxophone and Small Chamber Orchestra. Symphony Number One, Jordan Randall Smith, Sean Meyers - alto saxophone. (SNOtone)
- 2014: Rhapsody: Music for Cello and Orchestra: Concerto for Cello and Orchestra, Jordan Randall Smith, Dmitri Volkov - cello. (Self-Produced)
