= Mary Chun =

American conductor

Mary Chun is an American conductor based in the San Francisco Bay Area. She is music director of the Mercury Theater and has been the conductor of Earplay since 2000.

Chun earned her master's degree from San Francisco State University where she studied piano with Carlo Bussotti and conducting with Lászlo Varga. She served as Director of Musical Studies to Kent Nagano at the Opéra National de Lyon, assisting on his recording of Francis Poulenc's Dialogues of the Carmelites in 1992. She served on the music staff at the San Francisco Opera, helping prepare productions of Das Verratene Meer (1991) and The Death of Klinghoffer (1992). She later assisted on the company's 2002 production of Messiaen's Saint François d'Assise for which she also played the Ondes Martenot. She has also served on the music staff at the Los Angeles Opera and the Opera Theater of Saint Louis.

Chun led the Canadian, French and German premieres of John Adams’ chamber opera I Was Looking at the Ceiling and Then I Saw the Sky with Avanti! Chamber Orchestra in Montreal, Paris and Hamburg in addition to leading the same work with Lyric Opera Cleveland. She also served as music director for the world premieres of Libby Larsen's Every Man Jack, Carla Lucero's W U O R N O S, Juana, and t o u c h. Mort Revoco, and Guillermo Galindo Decreation: Fight Cherries. She conducted the Kosice Opera (opera company of Slovakia's State Theatre Košice) in Bizet's Carmen on tour in Germany, Switzerland, and Austria. She has also been invited to conduct at Ballet San Joaquin, Hawaii Opera Theater, Lyric Opera of Cleveland, Mendocino Music Festival, Opera Idaho, Pacific Repertory Opera, Texas Shakespeare Festival, West Bay Opera, and West Edge Opera.

Chun received the 2014 Award for Best Music Direction from the San Francisco Bay Area Theater Critics Circle Award for her work conducting Mozart's Marriage of Figaro and the nomination for Best Music Director of 2016 with Cinnabar's production of Frank Loesser's Most Happy Fella.

She is one of very few professional-level players of the Ondes Martenot living in the United States. Among her many performances on the instrument, she appeared with the Los Angeles Master Chorale at the Disney Concert Hall.

Several of Chun's recordings with Earplay and the Empyrean Ensemble are available through ArkivMusic, featuring music of Cindy Cox, Kurt Rohde, Jorge Liderman and William Kraft. Chun is listed in a historic database of important women in music maintained by the Vítězslava Kaprálová Society.
