= More (Symphony Number One album) =

Live album by Symphony Number One, Jordan Randall Smith
- Released: December 16, 2016
- Recorded: April 8, 2016 – November 24, 2016 in Baltimore, Maryland
- Venues: St. Ignatius Church; Light Street Presbyterian Church; Emmanuel Episcopal Church
- Genre: Contemporary classical
- Length: 66:13
- Label: SNOtone
- Producers: Dan Rorke; Jordan Randall Smith (also exec.)

Symphony Number One chronology
Emergence (2016)	More	Approaching (2017)

More is the third live album by contemporary classical ensemble Symphony Number One, featuring music by Natalie Draper, Andrew Posner, and Jonathan Russell. The album was released on December 16, 2016 and debuted to critical attention in local and national publications.

== Track listing ==
No.	Title	Music	Length
1.	"Timelapse Variations"	Natalie Draper	19:11
2.	"Light Cathedral"	Jonathan Russell	25:14
3.	"The Promised Burning"	Andrew Posner	21:48
Total length:			66:13

== Personnel ==
Symphony Number One

- Sarah Eckman McIver – flute
- Garrett Hale – oboe
- Emily Madsen – oboe
- James Duncan – clarinet
- Melissa Johnson Lander – clarinet
- Kika Wright – bassoon
- Kelso Jones – horn
- Selena Maytum – French horn
- Sarah Manley – trombone
- Wanlu Ma – percussion
- Elizabeth G. Hill – piano
- Dan Rorke – keyboard
- Nicholas Bentz – violin
- Nikita Borisevich – violin
- Christopher Ciampoli – violin
- Karin Kilper viola
- Emily Sheil viola
- Mike Newman – cello
- Michael Rittling – Double bass
- Jordan Randall Smith – conductor

Additional musicians

- Willie Santiago – flute
- Peyden Shelton – trumpet
- Adrienne Knauer – harp
- Brendan Betyn – percussion]]
- Alan Buxbaum – percussion
- Andy Emerich – percussion
- Nick Mullen – percussion
- Hanbing Jia – violin

Technical personnel

- Dan Rorke – producer
- Arun Ravendhran – engineer
