= Katie McMahon =

Irish singer and harpist

- Born: Dublin, Ireland
- Genres: Celtic
- Occupations: Singer, harpist
- Instruments: Voice, harp
- Formerly of: Anúna

Katie McMahon is an Irish singer and harpist. She performed the soprano solo in the original Riverdance interval act at the Eurovision Song Contest 1994 in Dublin.

== Early life ==
McMahon was born and raised in Dublin, Ireland. She was classically trained in voice and harp and studied Italian and Drama Studies at Trinity College Dublin.

== Career ==
McMahon performed with the Irish vocal ensemble Anúna.

In May 1994, she appeared with Anúna in the first performance of Riverdance at the Eurovision Song Contest 1994 in Dublin. Writing in The Irish Times in December 1994, Joe Jackson described her voice in the opening section of Riverdance as "so sublime it immediately reminds one of poetry, purity and perfection".

When Riverdance developed into a full stage production, McMahon continued to perform with the show. Writing in MinnPost in 2008, Michael Metzger described her voice as a "silvery soprano" and noted her continuing popularity as a live performer in the United States.

After leaving Riverdance, McMahon released solo albums including After the Morning (1998), Shine (2001), Celtic Christmas (2003), St. Patrick's Day (2007), and Christmas Angels. Reviewing After the Morning for Rambles.NET, Jean Emma Price described McMahon as possessing "a pure, clear soprano" and called the album "highly recommended".

In 2012, McMahon debuted her musical production Loving the Silent Tears in Los Angeles. In 2019, her show Celtic Rhythm toured the United States.

== Personal life ==
McMahon met her husband, bassist Ben Craig, while on tour with Riverdance in Minneapolis in 1998 and later settled there.
