= Natalie Draper =

American composer

- Born: 1985 (age 40–41)
- Genres: Classical
- Occupation: composer
- Instrument: piano
- Label: SNOtone

Natalie Draper is an American composer who teaches composition at Syracuse University's Setnor School of Music.

== Biography ==
Draper completed her Doctor of Musical Arts at the Peabody Institute of Johns Hopkins University in 2017. Her teachers include Oscar Bettison and Joel Hoffman. In 2015, Draper was a Fellow at the Tanglewood Music Center.

Draper has been featured by GAMMA-UT, MusicX, SEAMUS, the Fromm Scholarship ensemble, Lunar Ensemble, and SONAR New Music Ensemble. Her works has been recognized by the Baltimore Sun, Portland Press Herald, and Fanfare, among others. Draper's work, Timelapse Variations, was commissioned by Symphony Number One and premiered in November 2016. Works such as Decadent Music Box have garnered various awards and positive mentions. In 2018, Draper collaborated with NASA to help provide music from Timelapse Variations for a major research presentation on the impact crater of the Hiawatha Glacier.

Draper has also published an article on Stephen Sondheim.

== Partial list of works ==
External videos
- Timelapse Variations on NASA mini-documentary, YouTube video

- Decadent Music Box
- Deflected Harmlessly into the Ceiling
- O Sea-Starved, Hungry Sea
- The Ravens of Unresting Thought
- Strains in the Signal
- Timelapse Variations
- Water in the Glass

== Discography ==
- 2016: More: Timelapse Variations. Also includes Jonathan Russell: Light Cathedral; Andrew Posner: The Promised Burning. (SNOtone ST03)
- 2012: Mix Tape / Compilation #1: One Bird Flew South. (Collaboration with Danny Clay.) Include additional works by various artists. (Don't Be A Stranger DBS-001)
