= Pirayeh Pourafar =

Pirayeh Pourafar (Born) is an Iranian musician, tar player, and expert on Persian music. Pourafar learned the radif as a student of Grand Master Ali Akbar Shahnazi at the Royal National Music Conservatory of Tehran. She has directed two successful Persian music ensembles, Nava Ensemble and Lian Ensemble.

Pirayeh Pourafar is a composer whose compositions have been noted for innovative sophistication, thoughtfulness, and commanding technique. She entered the Royal National Music Conservatory of Teheran at the age of nine, where she started her studies with Masters Houshang Zarif, Habiboallah Sallehi, Mahmoud Karimi and Grand Master Ali-Akbar Shahnazi. From these masters she learned the Radif of Persian Traditional Music. She obtained an extensive knowledge of theory and a greatly accomplished technique on the Tar. After several years of training and numerous performances, she began her official cooperation with the National Radio and Television of Iran in 1975. At seventeen, Pourafar had performed with Iran 's most prestigious artists at the Center for Preservation and Propagation of Iranian Music, where she worked as both a performer and a teacher for four years. In 1979 Pirayeh moved to Spain to continue her studies in Western Classical Music at the Madrid Royal Conservatory and resided in Europe for three years. In 1982 she came to the U.S. where later she received her Master of Fine Arts from the California Institute of the Arts in Performer/Composer program. Pourafar was a music director of the Nava Ensemble from 1989 to 1994. She led the Nava ensemble to critical acclaim and established a reputation for high artistic standards and innovative and educational concert experiences. She created a successful summer series with capacity audiences and encouraged the organization's community involvement. She is known not only for her work in traditional Persian music, but also for her creative east–west fusion of composition and performance work. She has composed work for the stage, orchestra, solo performers and Instrumental ensemble. Pourafar diverse performing background has led her involvement in many innovative ensembles. Pirayeh has headlined on major festivals throughout the world. She has given lecture-demonstrations, and workshops throughout the United States, Europe, and Middle East . Pirayeh composed music for short film The "River’s Quest" which was featured at the 2003 CalArts View Screening Series Festival and music for a Documentary "Four Wives - One Man". Pourafar is one of the first women to play the traditional Persian Music outside Iran, thereby paving the way for the wider role for women in traditional Persian music in Iran . In 1996 Pourafar has co-founded The Lian Ensemble.

== Awards ==
- Durfee ARC 2008
- Durfee Master Musician Fellowship 2006
- L.A. Treasures Awards 2005
- ACTA Apprenticeship Program 2004
- Individual Artist Fellowship Award C.O.L.A. 2004
- ACTA recipient 2003
- American Composer Forum (Composers Suitcase), Middle Eastern Unite, 2002.

== Composition for Theater ==
- "Philoktetes" Directed by Michael Hackett and Olivier Award-winning British actor, Henry Goodman, Getty Villa
- "Medea" Directed by Lenka Udovicki and starring Annette Bening, U.C.L.A
- "Layla Means Night" with Rosanna Gamson

== Discography ==
- Plucking for nine different plucked instruments, Tom Johnson (2017)
- Majnun with Lian Ensemble, Merima Ključo and Theodore Bikel (2016)
- The Window with Lian Ensemble and the Tuvan Master Throat Singers (2010)
- Timeless Persian Treasures, With Minoo Javan (2006)
- PANGEA with Djivan Gasparyan, Pandit Swapan Chaudhuri, Houman Pourmehdi, Miroslav Tadic and Randy Gloss (2006)
- The Hidden Sacred with Dark Wing (2005)
- Khak-e-Heyran with Lian Ensemble (2004)
- Light and Fire with Lian Ensemble (2003)
- Maiden's Prayer with Lisa Lynne (2001)
- The Echoes Living Room Concerts volume 8 (2001) (dedicated to the memory of George Harrison 1943–2001).
- Dar Shekarestan Live recording with Lian Ensemble (2000)
- Banquet in the Tavern of Ruin with Lian Ensemble (1999)
- The Name of The Beloved with Lian Ensemble (1999)
- New Music of Iran volume I, II, III, IV (1982-1989)
- Entazar with Mohamad Reza Shajarian and Farabi ensemble (1979)
- Javanan Vatan with Parissa and Molana Ensemble (1979)
- Numerous recording with the National Iranian Radio and Televisionand (1976-1979)
