= The York Manor =

Historic site in Los Angeles, California

- Interactive map of The York Manor
- Location: 4908 York Blvd, Highland Park, Los Angeles, California
- Coordinates: 34.121531°N 118.208730°W
- Owner: Extraordinary Living – A Real Estate Collective
- Type: Private event space, wedding venue, production rental facility

Construction
- Built: 1913
- Renovated: 2015 (as The York Manor)

Website
- https://yorkmanorhlp.com/

The York Manor is a private event space, wedding venue, production rental facility, and a historic site in Highland Park, Los Angeles, California. The building's architects were Robert Train and Edmund Williams; it opened in 1913, originally housing a Methodist congregation. In 1936, the site became the "York Boulevard Church of Christ." The building was left empty in the late 1990s/early 2000s and acquired damage from disuse. In 2013 the building was leased by a music promoter and minimally renovated to become The Church on York Performing Arts Space. In May 2014 the City of Los Angeles forced the venue to shut down due to noise complaints, lack of permits, and underage drinking.

The building was then acquired by Extraordinary Living – A Real Estate Collective, who described it as being "in an extremely neglected condition and needed a complete overhaul." The entire building underwent a full-scale renovation which provided modern conveniences while preserving historical details and fixtures. In 2014 the Cultural Heritage Commission of Los Angeles named the building as an official historical landmark, and it was reopened as The York Manor in the fall of 2015. The facility is now used for a variety of private functions including weddings, receptions, parties, anniversaries, baby showers, photo shoots, conferences, workshops, 501(c)(3) fundraisers, etc. The venue also includes a separate downstairs space called The Rembrandt, a "theater style club" available as an additional or standalone rental for performances.
