= Earplay (new chamber music) =

Earplay is a chamber music ensemble founded in the San Francisco Bay Area in 1985.

They describe their music as "lyrical and ferocious, modern and Romantic, finely honed and accessible." Earplay was founded in 1985 by a consortium of composers and performers. Each year, Earplay presents live concerts of challenging music by contemporary composers, including works commissioned specially for Earplay, which annually sponsors a competition for new compositions. The group's conductor is member Mary Chun, who first appeared as a guest conductor with the group in 1999 (as a guest conductor replacing George Thompson, who conducted the group for 14 years). Composer Martha Callison Horst served as president for a number of years. The current President is Stephen Ness.

Earplay's presentation of new works is designed to assist composers in their craft and provide recordings for archival purposes. To increase audience involvement, the organization stages pre-concert presentations with composers and discussions of their works.

== Listen to ==
- 2005 season highlights
