= Juventas New Music Ensemble =

- Origin: Boston, Massachusetts, USA
- Genres: contemporary classical music
- Years active: 2005 – present
- Members: Artistic and Executive Director; Oliver Caplan; Flute; Nicholas Southwick; Clarinet; Celine Ferro; Percussion; Thomas Schmidt; Piano; Julia Scott Carey; Violin; Olga Patramanska-Bell; Violin; Ryan Shannon; Viola; Lu Yu; Cello; Thomas Barth; Horn; Anne Howarth; Soprano; Kelley Hollis
- Website: www.juventasmusic.com

The Juventas New Music Ensemble is an instrumental ensemble located in Boston, Massachusetts devoted to performing musical works by emerging composers. Their programming focuses on composers who actively blur the boundaries between popular musical genres and traditional art music. Since its inception, Juventas has received favorable reviews from several Boston publications.

== History ==
Juventas was founded in 2005 by Erin Huelskamp, Julia Scott Carey, and Mark David Buckles. The three musicians decided to create the ensemble after realizing the difficulties young, unknown composers face in securing performance venues for their works. Huelskamp stated, "We felt young and underrepresented in a musical world that highly values the wisdom and experience that comes with age....the lack of professional opportunities for young composers and musicians is a real problem to which Juventas hopes to provide some solution." The Latin word juventas (meaning youth), was chosen to reflect the ensemble's mission.

Since 2005, Juventas has regularly performed concerts of new works, including many world premieres. The ensemble has also collaborated with other Boston music groups and organizations. In December 2009, Juventas collaborated with the Lorelei Ensemble on a holiday concert entitled "One Light," which featured seven new works by young composers. The works spanned a variety of subjects including Christmas, Hanukkah, the winter solstice, and Nietzschean philosophy.

In September 2010, Juventas performed a concert entitled "The Exquisite Corpse" which utilized dancers from the Boston Conservatory to supplement and accentuate the musical works. The choreography and relevance of the dance to the music received mixed reviews, though on the whole the concert was deemed a success. On this particular program, the oldest composition dated from 2005.

== Core members ==
Juventas consists of ten "core members". Other Guest Artists participate if required for a particular work. The current core members are Oliver Caplan (Artistic Director), Nicholas Southwick (Flute), Celine Ferro (Clarinet), Julia Scott Carey (Piano), Olga Patramanska-Bell (Violin), Thomas Schmidt (Percussion), Ryan Shannon (Violin), Lu Yu (Viola), Thomas Barth (Cello), Kelley Hollis (Soprano), and Anne Howarth (French Horn).

== Past members ==
- Lidiya Yankovskaya (Music Director 2010-2017, Artistic Director 2014-2017)
- Mark David Buckles (Music Director Emeritus)
- Michael Sakir (Music Director)
- Zach Jay (Flute)
- Marguerite Levin (Clarinet)
- Brian Calhoon (Percussion)
- Yochanan Chendler (Violin)
- Emily Deans (Viola)
- Rachel Arnold (Cello).
