= Eagle Rock Music Festival =

Annual street festival in Eagle Rock, California

The Eagle Rock Music Festival is an annual street festival in Eagle Rock, California, that takes place in October. A variety of Los Angeles–based musical talents and artists come together to perform on the main Colorado Boulevard.

== History ==
The festival was originally called Dahlia Days after the Dahlia flower. In an interview with Brian Akio Martinez, head organizer, he said, "The original goal was celebrating art and culture in the community and surrounding businesses. We were putting small groups into venues. A coffee house would have some jazz; a restaurant would have some music, etc. Over the years, people really took to the idea. It was becoming so popular that people would spill out into the sidewalks and into the streets, literally."
