= Sond'Ar-te Electric Ensemble =

The Sond’Ar-te Electric Ensemble is a Portuguese chamber ensemble, based in Lisbon, which specialises in contemporary classical music. This is an innovative music ensemble in the European new music scene whose core structure is the permanent combination of 5 acoustic instruments (flute, clarinet, violin, cello, piano) with electronics relying on the Miso Studio’s technical expertise.

The ensemble's repertoire covers many important works written for 5-8 instrument ensembles of the 20th and 21st centuries. One of the key features of this project is the commission of new works. This encourages the development of new contemporary chamber music with electronics. Special attention is given to Portuguese creations.

The ensemble is composed of a young generation pool of musicians with individual careers as soloists. Since their premiere and concert circulation in September 2007, the ensemble has become a massive hit among artists abroad. They have performed in Paris, the Warsaw Autumn Festival, Bilbao Guggenheim Museum, City of London Festival, Seoul, Tokyo, and Berlin.

The Sond’Ar-te Ensemble is frequently involved in projects containing media, music, and theatre, particularly in the development of educational activities such as forums for young composers.

== Premieres ==
Since its creation, the Sond'Ar-te Electric Ensemble has premiered over 80 works from composers, including Jonathan Harvey, Flo Menezes, Peter Swinnen, Paulo Ferreira-Lopes, Eduardo Reck Miranda, Takayuki Rai, Leilei Tian, Pedro Rebelo, Tiago Cutileiro, José Luís Ferreira, Philippe Leroux, Clarence Barlow, Luís Tinoco, Isabel Soveral, John McLachlan, Masataka Matsuo, Pedro Amaral, Miguel Azguime, Bruno Gabirro, Abel Paúl, Cândido Lima, Ivo Nilsson, João Madureira, Byung-moo Lee, and João Pedro Oliveira.

== Discography ==
The ensemble recorded 4 CDs devoted to the Portuguese contemporary classical music, 3 of them within the "Sond'Ar-te Electric Ensemble Soloists" series.

Review on the New Music Review Lounge by António Ferreira of the Cd "Nuno Pinto - clarinet & electronics: “The undeniable Nuno Pinto’s artistry, combining a wide range of classical and contemporary instrumental techniques with a willingness to participate in more experimental music creation, establishes the conditions for a rewarding performance of the electro/acoustic works presented on this CD." (...) "The CD is yet another proof that Nuno Pinto is a clarinettist of the first order. The compositions are performed with great skill and confidence, as he feels clearly comfortable whilst performing in an amplified setting with electronics. The quality of the recording is excellent, and the overall balance between the acoustic and the electronic spots on."
