= Cornelius Boots =

American composer and multi-instrumentalist

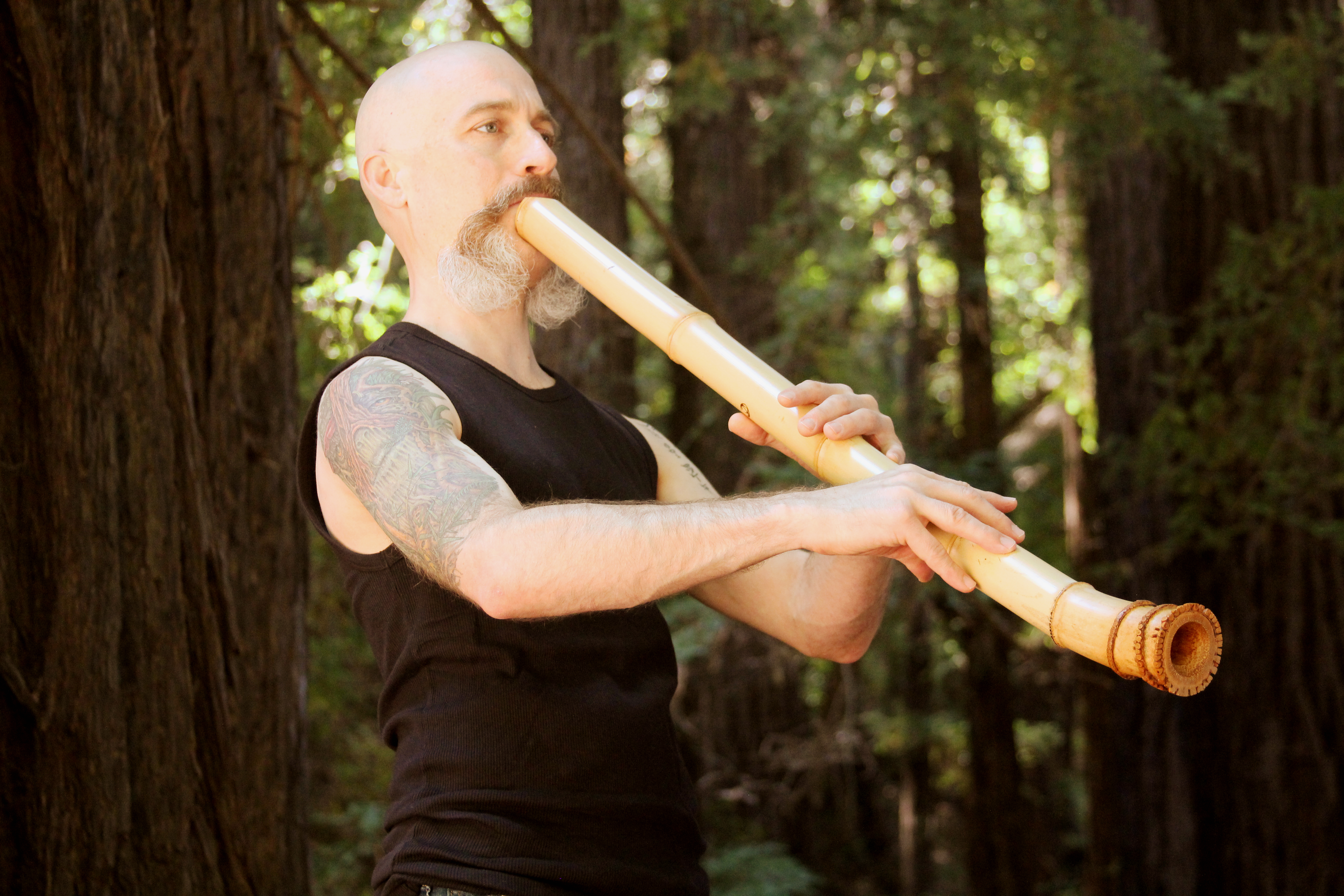
- Cornelius Boots playing a Taimu shakuhachi bamboo flute.

Background information
- Occupation: Composer
- Instruments: Bass clarinet; Shakuhachi
- Website: http://corneliusboots.com

Cornelius Boots (Cornelius Shinzen Boots) is an American composer and multi-instrumentalist. Best known for founding and leading Edmund Welles, the only composing bass clarinet quartet in the world, he now mainly plays and composes for the shakuhachi flute having retired from bass clarinet in 2015. Boots had been playing the clarinet from the time he was in fourth grade, and credits his early experience playing a reed instrument with what he called a "spike of awareness."

He received his shakuhachi master teaching’s license (Shihan) from Grand Master Michael Chikuzen Gould in 2013. He has recorded five albums and performs internationally. He played on stage during Sony's E3 2018 conference, prior to the reveal of Ghost of Tsushima, a samurai-based video game.

Boots mostly plays taimu shakuhachi, which are long, wide-bore flutes noted for their deep tones.
