= Lian Ensemble =

Lian Ensemble is a Persian classical music ensemble based in Los Angeles, California, USA.

== History ==
The Lian Ensemble was established in 1996 by Pirayeh Pourafar, Houman Pourmehdi. The group has performed throughout the U.S. and internationally.

== Style ==
The Lian Ensemble is a group of performers and composers. Their compositions fuse the Mystical Persian musical heritage with the contemporary sensibilities of postmodern Jazz. Combining a musical vision with dedication to experimentation, they create a synthesis of mystical world music composed of traditional and folk melodies and instruments.

The Lian is composed of musicians whose diverse musical styles lend to a blend of "mystical world music." Their flows between a diverse range of styles and traditions, forging a unique sound.

== On Lian ensemble ==
"The Lian Ensemble features the best Iranian musicians in the West" GAVRIEL FISKE, The Jerusalem Post

- The Lian Ensemble... World Class Persian Musicians. New sound Music
- Gifted World Music Group. Don Heckman, Los Angeles Times
- Best World Music/ Recombinant Artist LAWMA 2004 & 2005, By John Payne LA WEEKLY

"The Lian Ensemble's concert was an exhilarating highlight of the triannual World Festival of Sacred Music" Laurel Fishman, GRAMMY.com

"Painstakingly structured compositions with pounding rhythms" Los Angeles Times

"combining intricate musical structure with an evocative blend of traditional and original compositions" Laurel Fishman, GRAMMY.com

== Discography ==
- "THE NAME OF THE BELOVED" (1998)
- "BANQUET IN THE TAVERN OF RUIN" (1999)
- Dar Shekarestan (2000)
- "SYNCOPATION" (2001)
- The Call of Love: The Art of Persian and Indian Improvisations (2001), featuring Rajeev Taranath
- Light and Fire (2002)
- Khake Heyran (2004)
- "The Hidden Sacred-Dark Wing" (2005)
- Pangea - The Tale of Unity (2006)
- The Window (2010)
- "Majnun" (2014)

== See also ==
- Music of Iran
