= Aaron Novik =

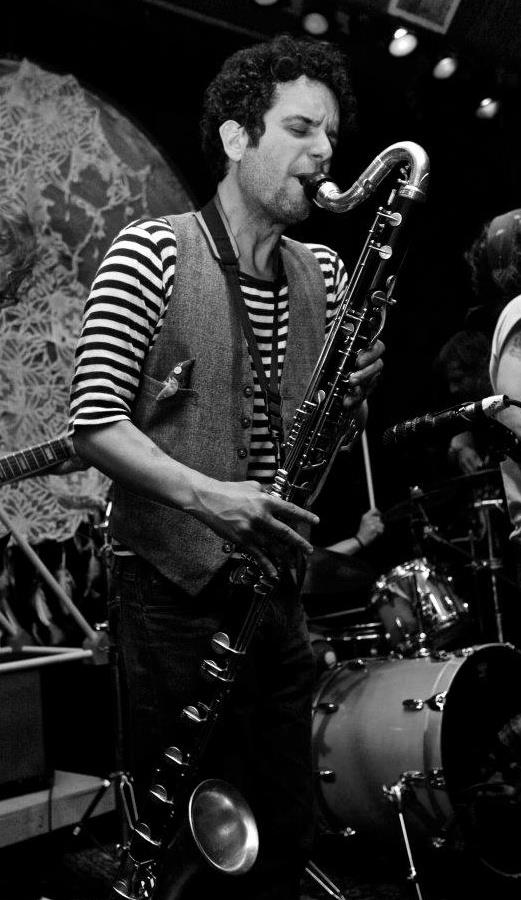

Background information
- Born: July 21, 1974 (age 51)
- Occupation: Composer
- Instruments: Clarinet; Bass Clarinet
- Label: Tzadik
- Website: http://www.aaronnovik.com

Aaron Novik (born July 21, 1974) is an American composer, clarinetist and bandleader based in San Francisco. He is involved with the Bay Area Improv Scene and is a member of Edmund Welles The Bass Clarinet Quartet which was a 2004 recipient of a New Works Creation and Presentation grant from Chamber Music America. Novik has appeared in San Francisco and New York City with guitarist Fred Frith re-creating his 1980 avant-garde dance album, Gravity.

Novik's most recent album Secrets of Secrets was released on John Zorn's Tzadik Records in February 2012 as part of the Radical Jewish Culture Series. Secrets of Secrets was hailed by The East Bay Express as "enticing" and "ferociously executed" and by The Jewish Week as "richly textured and eclectic avant-klez" for its use of the 13th century sacred Kabbalah texts of Rabbi Eleazar of Worms. His second most recent album, Floating World Vol. 1 was released on the Porto Franco Record label in 2011. Albums The Samuel Suite, Simulacra and Kipple were released on the Evander label.

== Discography ==
- Secrets of Secrets (Tzadik Records, 2012)
- Floating World Vol. 1 (Porto Franco Records, 2011)
- The Samuel Suite (Evander Records, 2008)
- Simulacra (Evander Records, 2008)
- Kipple (Evander Records, 2006)
- Gubbish (Odd Shaped Case, 2004)

=== Digital Release Only ===
- Our Band Could Be as Serious as Your Life (2013)
- Love Triangle Elementary School (2013)
- Aaron Novik/Greg Saunier Duo (2013)
- Aaron Novik/Arrington de Dionyso Duo (2013)
- Frowny Frown Vol. 1 (2013)
- Storyboard Music Vol. 1 (2013)
- Storyboard Music Vol. 2 -featuring Edmund Welles (2013)
