= Quince Ensemble =

American contemporary treble vocal ensemble

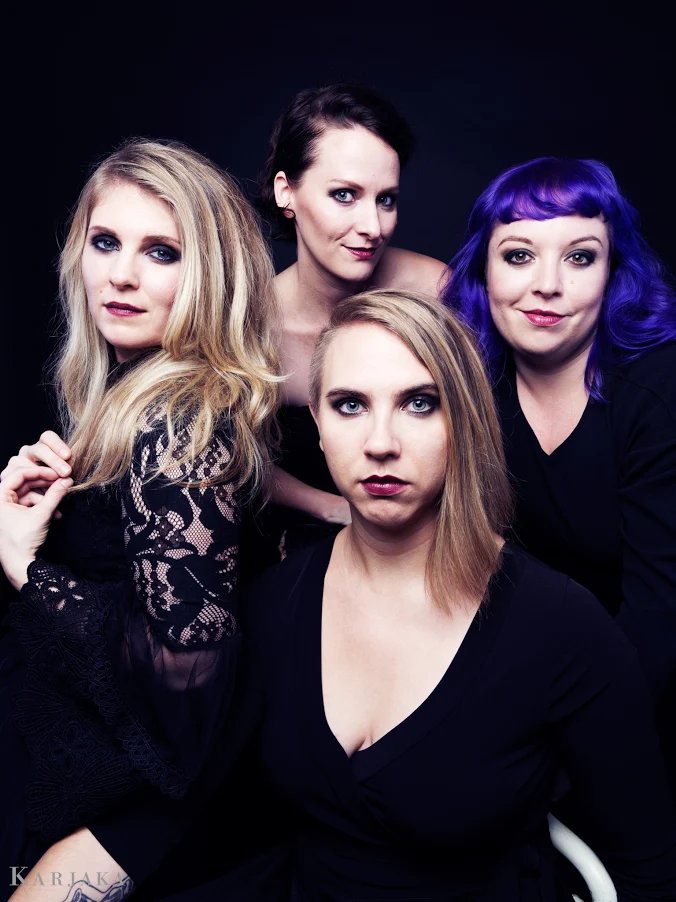
- Quince in 2018. (l-r): Amanda DeBoer Bartlett, Carrie Henneman Shaw, Kayleigh Butcher, Liz Pearse

Background information
- Genres: Contemporary Classical
- Years active: 2010-present
- Labels: New Focus; Willow Street; Thrill Jockey
- Members: Amanda DeBoer Bartlett; Kayleigh Butcher; Liz Pearse; Carrie Henneman Shaw
- Past members: Aubrey von Almen; McKayela Collins-Hornor
- Website: www.quince-ensemble.com

Quince Ensemble (sometimes referred to as Quince Contemporary Vocal Ensemble) is a contemporary treble vocal ensemble that specializes in contemporary classical music. In 2010, founding members, Amanda DeBoer Bartlett and Kayleigh Butcher met at a Neko Case concert in Bowling Green, Ohio while attending Bowling Green State University. Focusing on an all-female group, the two assembled a five-member ensemble consisting of McKayela Collins-Hornor, Aubrey von Almen, Liz Pearse, Kayleigh Butcher, and Amanda DeBoer Bartlett within a year. As performance schedules became more demanding, Aubrey and McKayela left the group, and Carrie Henneman Shaw of Ensemble Dal Niente joined the ensemble, resulting in the current quartet roster.

Quince has since performed extensively throughout the United States, performing primarily new music works by 20th and 21st century composers including: David Lang, Morton Feldman, and Steve Reich and most recently, Jennifer Jolley, Evan Williams, Paul Pinto and Kate Soper.

Quince is signed to New Focus Recordings, and has released two albums with them. In July 2017, Quince's Hushers was judged "Critic's Choice" by Opera News and they were named "the Anonymous 4 of new music." They have also collaborated with high-caliber artists and ensembles such as Eighth Blackbird, Third Coast Percussion, Ensemble Dal Niente, and Laurie Anderson.

== Discography ==
Name	Date	Label	Format
Realign The Time	2014	Self-Release	CD, Vinyl, Digital Download
Hushers	2017	New Focus	CD, Digital Download
Motherland	2018	New Focus	CD, Digital Download
David Lang's love fail	2021	Innova Records	CD, Digital Download
This a Changin' World	*2024	unknown	Digital Download

== Collaborative albums ==
Name	Date	Artist	Label	Format
Scenes & Lines	2017	Austin New Music Co-Op	Willow Street Recordings	Digital Download
Play What They Want	2017	Man Forever	Thrill Jockey	CD, Digital Download
