= Thelema Trio =

- Origin: Gent, Antwerpen, Belgium
- Genres: Contemporary classical
- Occupation: Chamber music
- Years active: 2003-present
- Label: Innova Recordings
- Members: Ward De Vleeschhouwer, piano Peter Verdonck, saxophones Rik De Geyter, clarinets
- Past members: Marco Antonio Mazzini, clarinets (2003-2010)
- Website: http://www.thelematrio.com

Thelema Trio is a Belgian ensemble.

Their performances in Belgium and abroad include prestigious festivals such as November Music (Belgium - the Netherlands), International Clarinet Festival in Tama, Tokyo (Japan), Artuatuca Festival (Belgium), National SCI Conference Greensboro, North-Carolina (USA), Annual New Music & Art Festival Bowling Green (USA), International Festival of Contemporary Music in Lima (Peru) and National SCI Conference 2010 in Columbia, South Carolina (USA).

== History ==
Marco Antonio Mazzini, Peter Verdonck and Ward De Vleeschhouwer met each other in Ghent, Belgium. At Belgium’s Royal Conservatoire of Music, the three musician-composers discovered a shared interest in experimenting and making music with a range of sounds in different genres. They also shared the ambition to perform their music, including their own compositions, all over the world. Their music ranges from intimate, understated pieces to more extravagant compositions.

The Thelema Trio started with three graduates of the Ghent Conservatoire, where they studied chamber music with Marcel Lequeux, Filip Rathé (Spectra Ensemble) and John Whitelaw. Ward de Vleeschouwer, Peter Verdonck and Marco Mazzini have been performing together as Thelema Trio since March 2003.

In their first year, they toured all over Belgium and the Netherlands, then performed in Cittá Della Pieve in Italy in August 2004 at the invitation of composer Luca Vanneschi, to perform a work he had composed especially for them. In October and November 2004, they toured the west coast of Peru. The Universidad San Marcos in Lima had invited the ensemble for concerts, master classes and lectures in Lima, Trujillo, Arequipa and Chiclayo. They performed a number of concerts in these cities and worked with local musicians and composers.

In July 2005 they gave a concert at the International Clarinet Festival 2005 in Tama, Tokyo. They followed this with an extensive tour of the US in October in Greensboro, North-Carolina, Birmingham, Alabama, Monsmouth and Portland, Oregon, where they were invited by the American Society Of Composers to perform American and Belgian work. This tour was completed with another week of concerts in Peru, South-America.

The following summer in 2006 was entirely dedicated to the recording and mixing of their first album, simply called “T H E L E M A…” On this disc the trio has selected a number of compositions that had been written for them exclusively and that had been played throughout the previous years. “T H E L E M A…” was released with a prestigious concert in Ghent in April 2007 with the kind support of the Flemish authorities. After the recordings of this album in 2006, Thelema Trio was invited as exclusive guest ensemble at Annual New Music & Art festival in Bowling Green, Ohio, US.

In March 2008 they had an extensive tour in the US, playing in universities and festivals of Missouri, Wisconsin and Ohio. Beside those concerts they recorded a second full CD in the University of Missouri with only New American Music, entitled “Neither From Nor Towards…” after the wonderful piece by composer Eric Honour, who also engineered this recording. This album was released in November 2009, again with a concert in Ghent which hosted a large audience for the trio. Innova Recordings released the CD worldwide in Spring 2010.

The year 2010 marked a turning point in the career of this ensemble. Original clarinettist and founding member Marco Antonio Mazzini decided to leave Belgium again for his home country Peru. His departure from the trio left an open position in the trio, which was filled by Belgian clarinettist Rik De Geyter. In September 2010 he performed his first concert with Thelema Trio in the Netherlands in a very beautiful venue in the Dutch country on an evening dedicated to the music of Ellen Lindquist. In November 2010 the trio again toured the US to promote the “Neither From Nor Towards…” album.

== Recordings ==
http://www.thelematrio.com/recordings.html
