= Darragh Morgan =

Irish violinist

- Born: 1974 (age 51–52); Belfast
- Occupation: Violinist
- Website: darraghmorgan.com

Darragh Morgan (Belfast, 1974) is an Irish violinist. He established himself as a soloist of new music with recitals at Sonorities Festival, as well as in Prague, Malta, Nicosia, Hong Kong, South Korea, Italy, Switzerland, the Netherlands, the United States, throughout the UK, and Ireland.

== Biography ==
Morgan was part of The Smith Quartet and the music collective Noszferatu, and was artistic director of Music at Drumcliffe, a chamber music festival in the west of Ireland. He plays with the piano group The Fidelio Trio, which gave the European premiere of Michael Nyman's "The Photography of Chance".

Morgan has performed at international festivals including Warsaw Autumn, Ars Musica Brussels, Darmstadt, Aldeburgh, Spitalfields, Cheltenham, OCM, Dubrovnik Summer Festival, New Music Evenings Bratislava, BBC Proms Chamber Music, National Arts Festival Grahamstown, South Africa, Cutting Edge London, Festival D'Automne Paris, Besançon Festival de Musique, Lucerne Festival and Jazz sous les Pommiers, Coutance.

He has performed with many of the world's contemporary music groups including Ensemble Modern, London Sinfonietta, Musik Fabrik, Icebreaker, Birmingham Contemporary Music Group, Remix Ensemble, Jane's Minstrels and Topologies. He broadcasts for BBC Radio 3, was chosen as BBC Radio 4's Pick of the Week, and has appeared on The South Bank Show, SABC, CYBC, RTHK, WDR and RTÉ lyric fm. He appears as soloist with The Ulster Orchestra and performed in the world premiere of Sir John Tavener's Hymn of Dawn.

From 1999 to 2001, Morgan was leader of the Cyprus State Orchestra, and in 2004 was Concertmaster of the KZN Philharmonic in Durban, South Africa. During that year he also became Director of Baroque 2000, South Africa's period instrument orchestra. He leads English Touring Opera and was featured as leader of the orchestra in BBC 2's TV series The Genius of Beethoven.

Morgan is a faculty member of Apple Hill Chamber Music in New Hampshire, USA. He coaches at the Britten-Pears Young Artists Programme, has worked with The Mostar Sinfonietta in Bosnia and has given workshops for Buskaid in Soweto. He gives lecture-recitals on extended violin techniques at Queen's University Belfast, Trinity College Dublin and the Royal Conservatoire of Scotland. He teaches at Goldsmiths College, University of London, and was appointed 'Musician in Residence' at the University of Ulster.

Morgan has worked with a diverse range of international artists, such as Travis, Paul McCartney, The Divine Comedy, David Bowie, The Spice Girls, The Corrs, Jamiroquai, Yvonne Chaka Chaka, Incognito, The Lemon Heads and Brian Kennedy. In the world of Irish Traditional Music he has worked with Mícheál Ó Súilleabháin, Nóirín Ní Riain and Derek Bell of The Chieftains.

In 2020, during the COVID-19 pandemic, he hosted a week-long masterclass over Zoom, teaching students in Mozambique how to play the violin. He said, “It was such a positive experience to work with young musicians who have an insatiable appetite for learning and want to improve. They are so musically intelligent that their progress was really instantaneous.”

== Personal life ==
Morgan lives in south east London, with his wife, pianist Mary Dullea, and their children.

In 2023, he completed his PhD at the University of Ulster and became Dr Darragh Morgan.
