= Los Angeles Electric 8 =

American electric guitar chamber octet

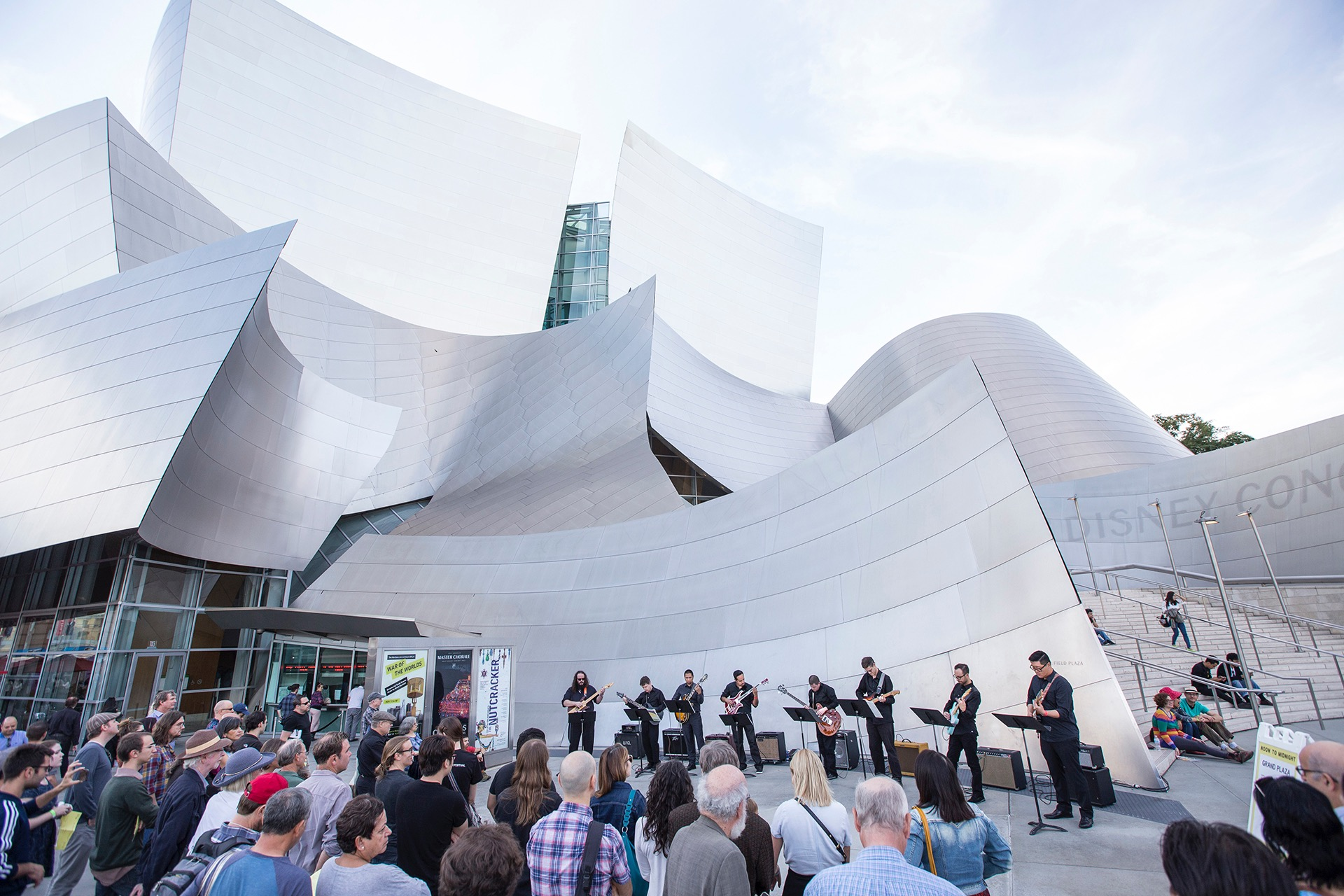
- Los Angeles Electric 8 performing in front of Walt Disney Concert Hall as part of L.A. Philharmonic's Noon to Midnight Festival 2017.

Background information
- Origin: Los Angeles, California, United States
- Genres: Classical; Post-rock
- Occupation: Chamber ensemble
- Years active: 2007-present
- Members: Felix Salazar; JohnPaul Trotter; Eric Kiersnowski; Andy Lee; Gabe Deutsch; Marc Nimoy; Brad Hogg; Philip Graulty
- Past members: Nicholas Deyoe (2013-2019); Jeremy Kerner (2013-2018); Tom Frazer (2014); Brandon Schmidt (2013); Hugo Aguayo (2010-2013); Ken Rosser (2009, 2012-2013); Tom Farrell (2009-2013); Philip Graulty (2007-2013); Kai Kurosawa (2010-2013); Chelsea Green (2007-2012); Alexander Sack (2008-2010); Ben Harbert (2007-2010); Andy Nathan (2007-2009); Brandon Mayer (2007-2008); Bryce Wilson (2007-2007)
- Website: losangeleselectric8.com

The Los Angeles Electric 8 is an electric guitar chamber octet founded in 2007. The group is based in Los Angeles, California. The founding members are Philip Graulty, Chelsea Green, Ben Harbert, Brandon Mayer, Marc Nimoy, Felix Salazar, JohnPaul Trotter and Bryce Wilson.

== New music ==
Much of the Los Angeles Electric 8's repertoire consists of new works including microtonal and minimalist music. They have performed music by Frank J. Oteri, Wayne Siegel, Randall Kohl, Cornelius Boots, Peter Yates, Derrick Spiva, and Nathaniel Braddock.

== Arrangements of older music ==
The Los Angeles Electric 8 produces arrangements of older works for their ensemble including Johann Sebastian Bach, Felix Mendelssohn, Dmitri Shostakovich, Giovanni Domenico Rognoni Taeggio, Giovanni Gabrieli, Olivier Messiaen, Igor Stravinsky and Benjamin Franklin. Their repertoire adapts music that was originally intended for strings, organ, gamelan, bells, wind ensembles, classical guitars and choirs.

== History ==
The octet began a 2004 classical performance of electric guitars organized by the Los Angeles Modern Guitar Project. The concert included students of guitarist Peter Yates playing a West Coast premiere of three new works by Chicago composer/guitarist Nathaniel Braddock. In 2006, four of those guitarists—Ben Harbert, Philip Graulty, Chelsea Green and Felix Salazar—performed for a memorial concert for the late composer James Tenney. From there, they constituted the rest of the group in 2007.

== Recordings ==
- Los Angeles Electric 8 plays Shostakovich, Mendelssohn, Braddock, Siegel, and Kohl (2008)
- Imagined Overtures (2009)
- Interlocking Textures (2012)

== See also ==
- Octet (music)
