= Los Angeles Chamber Orchestra =

American chamber orchestra based in Los Angeles, California, United States

The Los Angeles Chamber Orchestra (LACO) is an American chamber orchestra based in Los Angeles, California. LACO presents its Orchestral Series concerts at two venues, the Alex Theatre in Glendale and UCLA's Royce Hall.

== History ==
James Arkatov, a cellist, established LACO in 1968 as an artistic outlet for musicians from local film and record studios to perform the classical music repertoire at a chamber orchestra-scale of about 40–45 musicians. David Mermelstein wrote in 2005 on Arkatov's guiding principle of LACO:

"The idea was to create a group that would play works written expressly for chamber orchestra, many of them from the baroque era—music that the [Los Angeles] Philharmonic either wasn't interested in or suited to. The ensemble was never meant to compete with the Philharmonic; there was even a time when LACO's supporters hoped to see it take up permanent residence at the Music Center."

At the beginning of its history, LACO did not have a residency at a single concert hall. The orchestra performed in such venues as the Mark Taper Forum, Occidental College (Thorne Hall), the First Congregational Church of Los Angeles, and the California Institute of Technology (Beckman Auditorium). Currently, in addition to its Orchestral Series concerts at Alex Theatre and Royce Hall, LACO also presents a baroque music series at Zipper Hall at the Colburn School in downtown Los Angeles, and "In Focus" (a chamber music and discussion series) in Santa Monica at the Moss Theatre and San Marino at The Huntington. Its repertoire ranges from the baroque to newly commissioned works, the latter through its patron commissioning club, Sound Investment.

LACO's first music director was Neville Marriner, who used the Academy of St. Martin in the Fields as a guiding model for LACO. Gerard Schwarz was LACO's second music director, and expanded the orchestra's repertoire to include more American works. Iona Brown was named LACO's music advisor for the 1986–1987 season, and became music director the next season, serving through 1992. Christof Perick was the next LACO Music Director, from 1992 to 1995.

Conductor and pianist Jeffrey Kahane, was music director from 1997 to 2017. During Kahane's tenure, LACO made its Carnegie Hall debut in April 2002. In June 2005, LACO received the First place Award for Programming of Contemporary Music, offered by the American Society of Composers, Authors, and Publishers (ASCAP) and the American Symphony Orchestra League. Kahane now holds the title of conductor laureate with LACO.

In September 2017, Jaime Martín first guest-conducted LACO. On the basis of this appearance, in February 2018, LACO named Martín its next music director, effective with the 2019–2020 season, with an initial contract of 3 years. In June 2021, LACO announced an extension of Martín's contract as its music director through 2027. In February 2026, the LACO announced that Martín is to conclude his tenure as its music director at the close of the 2026–2027 season, and subsequently to take the title of music director laureate.

During the 2020–2021 COVID-19 pandemic, LACO began producing digital content in lieu of live performances. James Darrah was hired as their inaugural Creative Director of Digital Content and Derrick Spiva was appointed as artistic advisor. As of January 2021, the orchestra's current composer-in-residence is Ellen Reid. Past LACO composers-in-residence have included Uri Caine and Andrew Norman.

In February 2016, Matthias Pintscher first guest-conducted the LACO. He served as artist-in-residence with the LACO in 2018. In August 2026, the LACO announced the appointment of Pintscher as its next music director, effective with the 2027–2028 season, with an initial contract of four years. He is to hold the title of music director-designate for the 2026–2027 season.

== Discography ==
=== Studio albums ===
Year	Album details
2003	Bach: Concertos: Release date: November 11, 2003; Label: Deutsche Grammophon
