= Concorde Contemporary Music Ensemble =

Irish contemporary music ensemble

The Concorde Contemporary Music Ensemble (often simply Concorde), founded in 1976, is an Irish contemporary music ensemble. The group's purpose is stated as "[promoting] new music on a regular basis." It has released three full length albums and has gone on several international tours through Europe and North America. The group debuted in the American Embassy in Dublin. It is supported by the Arts Council of Ireland and the Arts Council of Northern Ireland. Concorde also promotes an annual series at the Hugh Lane Municipal Gallery in Dublin, which has been running for over 20 years.

== Performers ==
- Jane O'Leary - director, pianist
- Madeleine Staunton - flute, alto flute, piccolo
- Paul Roe - clarinet, bass clarinet
- Elaine Clark - violin
- David James - cello
- Tine Verbeke - vocals
- Richard O'Donnell - percussionist
- Dermot Dunne - accordion

== Discography ==
- 1997 - Celtic Connections
- 2000 - Containers, Galway Arts Festival 2000
- 2006 - Contemporary Music from Ireland
- rational option insanity
- Contemporary Music from Ireland
- Contemporary Music from Ireland
