= Smith Quartet =

The Smith Quartet is a UK based string quartet founded in 1988 that specializes in the performance of contemporary classical music, and is actively performing worldwide and recording as of 2006. They have premiered over 100 works by composers such as Kevin Volans, Graham Fitkin, Michael Nyman, Karl Jenkins, and Sally Beamish. They have also collaborated with dance companies and musicians in other genres, notably jazz composer Django Bates and Britpop band Pulp. The quartet frequently uses amplification and live electronics in performance to expand their range of performing venues and repertoire.

Their performance of Steve Reich's Different Trains was featured in the film Holocaust.

== Members ==
=== Current members (2023) ===
- Ian Humphries (1st violin)
- Rick Koster (2nd violin)
- Nic Pendlebury (viola)
- Deirdre Cooper (cello)

=== Former members ===
- Steven Smith (violin)
- Tanya Smith (cello)
- Clive Hughes (violin)
- Charles Mutter (violin)
- Darragh Morgan (violin)
- Sophie Harris (cello)
- Philip Sheppard (cello)
