= Concerto for Flute, Harp, and Orchestra (Mozart) =

1778 composition by Wolfgang Amadeus Mozart

- by W. A. Mozart
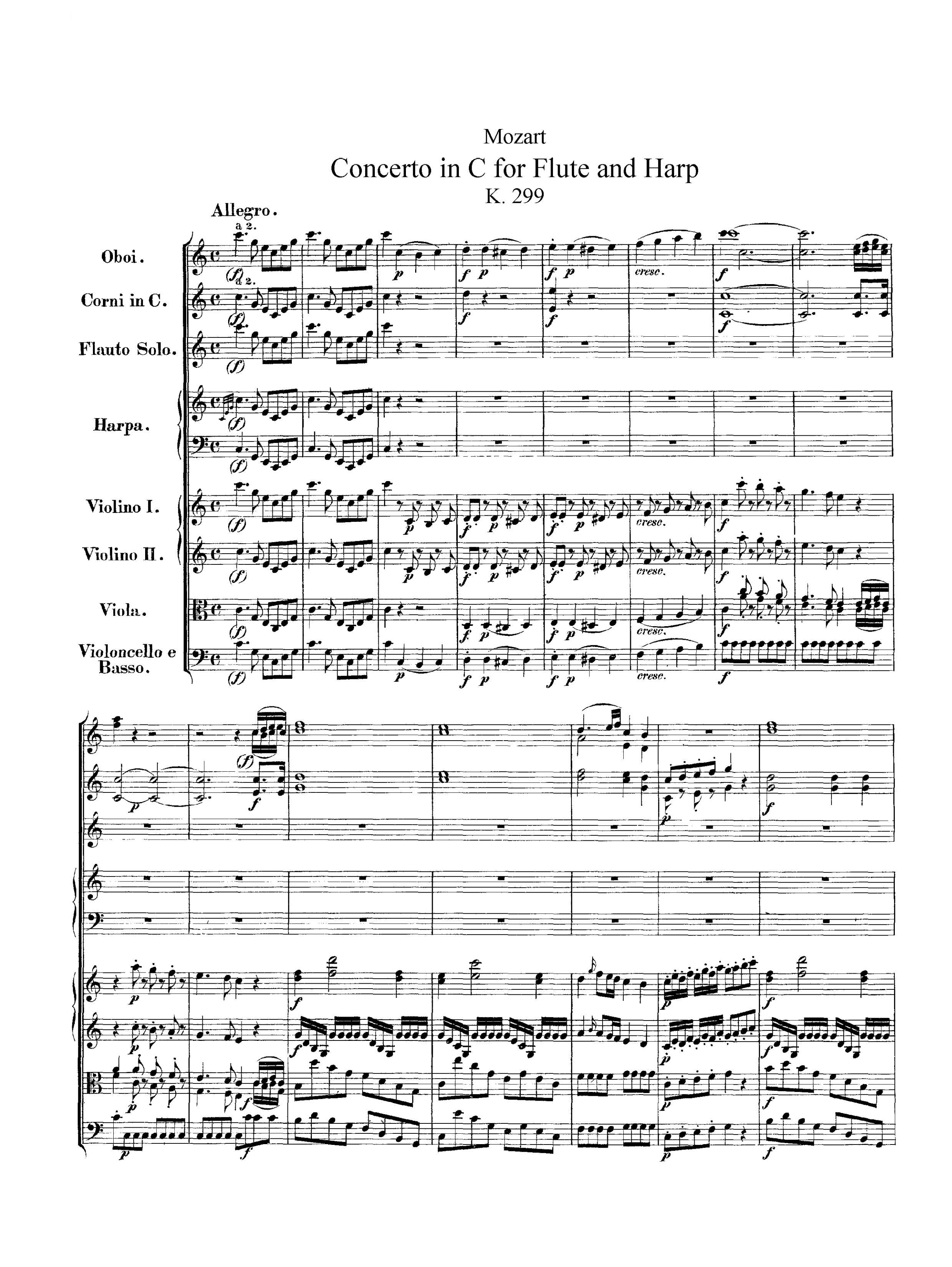
- Opening of the first movement
- Key: C major
- Catalogue: K. 299/297c
- Genre: Concerto
- Style: Classical period
- Composed: April 1778
- Movements: Three (Allegro, Andantino, Rondeau – Allegro)

The Concerto for Flute, Harp, and Orchestra in C major, K. 299/297c, is a concerto by Wolfgang Amadeus Mozart for flute, harp, and orchestra. It is one of only two true double concertos that he wrote (the other being his Piano Concerto No. 10; though his Sinfonia Concertante for Violin, Viola, and Orchestra could just as well be considered a "double concerto"), as well as the only piece of music by Mozart for the harp, apart from some harp exercises also written for the daughter of Adrien-Louis de Bonnières, duc de Guînes, that were discovered in 2026. The piece is one of the most popular such concertos in the repertoire, as well as often being found on recordings dedicated to either one of its featured instruments.

== History ==
Mozart wrote the concerto in April 1778, during his seven-month sojourn in Paris. It was commissioned by Adrien-Louis de Bonnières, a flutist, for his use and for that of his eldest daughter, Marie-Louise-Philippine (1759–1796), a harpist, who was taking composition lessons from the composer, at the duke's home, the Hôtel de Castries. Mozart stated in a letter to his father that he thought the duke played the flute "extremely well" and that Marie's playing of the harp was "magnifique". As a composition student, however, Mozart found Marie thoroughly inept. The duke (until 1776, the comte de Guines), an aristocrat Mozart came to despise, never paid the composer for this work, and Mozart instead was offered only half the expected fee for the lessons, through de Guines' housekeeper. But he refused it. (For his tutoring, Mozart was owed six Louis d'or.) Little is known of the work's early performance history, though it seems probable that father and daughter played it first.

In the classical period, the harp was still in development and was not considered a standard orchestral instrument. It was regarded more as a plucked piano. Therefore, the combination of harp and flute was considered extremely unusual. Currently, there is much more repertoire for a flute and harp duo, especially without orchestra. Much of this repertoire was written by composers in the nineteenth century. Mozart's opinion of the harp, however, was perhaps dubious at best, for he never wrote another piece that employed it.

Mozart quite likely composed this work with the duke's and his daughter's particular musical abilities in mind. He probably composed the majority of this concerto at the home of Joseph Legros, the director of the Concert Spirituel. Monsieur Legros had given Mozart the use of his keyboard in his home so that he could compose. (Mozart perhaps also composed part of the concerto at his second Paris apartment where he stayed with his mother, which was on the rue du Gros Chenet.)

The piece is essentially in the form of a Sinfonia Concertante, which was extremely popular in Paris at the time. Today, the concerto is often played by chamber ensembles, because it is technically and elegantly challenging for both the solo instruments it calls for. It is also often played by orchestras to display the talents of their own flutists and harpists.

Mozart did not include any cadenzas of his own, as is normal for his compositions. Alfred Einstein claimed that Mozart's cadenzas for this work were lost. A few popular cadenzas are often performed, such as those by Carl Reinecke, but many flutists and harpists have chosen to write their own. André Previn has also written cadenzas for this piece.

== Form and movements ==
I. Allegro

II. Andantino

III. Rondeau – Allegro
Alexander Murray (flute), Ann Yeung (harp), Sinfonia da Camera University of Illinois, Ian Hobson conducting

The concert is scored for two oboes, two natural horns in C, solo flute, solo harp, and strings.

The soloists in the piece will sometimes play with the orchestra, and at other times perform as a duo while the orchestra is resting. The flute and harp alternate having the melody and accompanying lines. In some passages, they also create counterpoint with just each other. Mozart concertos are standard in how they move harmonically, as well as that they adhere to the three-movement form of fast–slow–fast:

1. Allegro
2. Andantino
3. Rondeau – Allegro

In the first movement, the orchestra states both themes. The first is immediately present, and the second is introduced by the horn. Both themes fall under the conventional sonata form. The soloists then rework the already present themes.

The short phrases in the second movement are introduced by the strings, and become lyrically extended. This further develops into four variations on the theme. The cadenza in this movement, by the end of the fourth variation, leads to a coda, where the orchestra and soli focus on the lyrical theme. The key is in F major, and the horn is silent.

The form of the final movement is A–B–A–C–A–B–A, a typical sonata-rondo form. The only minor difference to the standard sonata-allegro form is the third appearance of the "A" theme in the parallel minor. The concerto ends with three forte C major chords.

== Critical response ==
Of this work, the critic Orrin Howard writes:

The Concerto is utterly charming, a sterling example of enlightened salon music in which the composer's individuality can be seen to be emerging. There are more melodies in the Concerto's three conventional movements than one could possibly shake a flute at—not to speak of a harp—and the writing for the instruments is brilliant without being excessively virtuosic.

On the other hand, and quite unusually for works by Mozart, the Flute and Harp Concerto has also attracted rather hostile critical comment. Charles Rosen, in a chapter of his book The Classical Style filled with glowing descriptions of Mozart's other concertos, writes:

the Concerto for Flute and Harp K. 299 ... is hackwork: it is true that Mozart's hackwork is a lesser composer's inspiration, and his craftsmanship is significant even here, but it would be doing Mozart less than justice to discuss this work along with the other concertos.

Patrick Mackie writes of

the inconsequential K. 299 Flute and Harp Concerto, written for a father and daughter pairing of aristocratic amateurs towards whom the composer developed resentments that the piece's all but aggressive insipidity hints at.

== Editions and recordings ==
In addition to the numerous cadenzas performers have to choose from, multiple editions of this piece also exist. The cadenzas composed by Carl Reinecke are the most commonly used to perform this piece.

Many recordings of this piece are available. James Galway has performed and recorded this piece many times, with harpists such as Fritz Helmis, Marisa Robles, and Ann Hobson Pilot.

== See also ==
- List of compositions for harp
