= Icebreaker discography =

This is the discography of the UK ensemble Icebreaker.

== Digital singles 2021 ==
- Graham Fitkin – Mesh (re-mastered) (Rookery Records, 29 January 2021)
- Steve Martland arr. Icebreaker – Remix (re-mastered) (Rookery Records, 26 February 2021) (Re-master of track from Century XXI UK A–M)
- John Godfrey - S.U.S.Y.W.I.M.P.S. (Rookery Records, 26 March 2021) (Re-master of track from Century XXI UK A–M)
- Anna Meredith arr. James Poke - Nautilus (Rookery Records, 23 April 2021)
- Julia Wolfe arr. James Poke - Big, Beautiful, Dark & Scary (Rookery Records, 21 May 2021)
- Michael Gordon & David Lang - Link (Rookery Records, 18 June 2021)
- Linda Buckley - Azure (Rookery Records, 16 July 2021)
- Kerry Andrew - The, What is it? The Golden Eagle? (Rookery Records, 13 August 2021)
- Jlin arr. James Poke - Black Origami (Rookery Records, 10 September 2021)
- Anna Meredith arr. James Poke - The Vapours (Rookery Records, 8 October 2021)
- Kate Moore - The Dam (Rookery Records, 5 November 2021)
- Philip Glass arr. James Poke - Rubric (Rookery Records, 3 December 2021)

== Albums ==
Official Bootleg (ICC, 1991, live album, cassette only)

- John Godfrey – Euthanasia and Garden Implements
- Damian LeGassick – Mad Legs In a Sack
- Michael Nyman arr J Godfrey – Think Slow, Act Fast
- Pete Garvey – Wires
- Michael Torke arr J Poke – The Yellow Pages
- Michael Gordon – Acid Rain (excerpt)
- Diderik Wagenaar – Tam Tam (excerpt)
- Louis Andriessen – Hoketus (excerpt)
- I D Mellish – Son of Cairn

Terminal Velocity (Argo, 1994)

- Michael Gordon – Yo Shakespeare
- Louis Andriessen arr J Poke – de Snelheid
- Gavin Bryars – The Archangel Trip
- Damian LeGassick – Evol
- David Lang – Slow Movement

Trance (Argo, 1996)

- Michael Gordon – Trance

Rogue's Gallery (New Tone, 1997)

- Michael Torke arr T Armstrong & P Wilson – Vanada
- David Lang – Cheating, Lying, Stealing
- Steve Martland arr J Godfrey – Shoulder to Shoulder
- John Godfrey – Euthanasia and Garden Implements
- Louis Andriessen – Hoketus (live)

Diderik Wagenaar (Composers' Voice / Donemus, 2001)

- Diderik Wagenaar – Metrum
- Diderik Wagenaar – Rookery Hill
- Diderik Wagenaar – Tam Tam

Extraction (between the lines, 2001)

- Damian LeGassick – Mad Legs in a Sack
- Gordon McPherson – The Baby Bear's Bed
- Mel – Goldylox ("Secret Hidden Bonus Track Mix") Remix of The Baby Bear's Bed

Trance (Cantaloupe Music, 2004) Remix and re-master of Argo album (same track listing)

Cranial Pavement (Cantaloupe Music, 2005)

- Conlon Nancarrow arr J Poke – Study #2b
- John Godfrey – Gallows Hill
- Yannis Kyriakides – Blindspot
- Richard Craig – Chook

Terminal Velocity (Cantaloupe Music, 2005) Re-master of Argo album (same track listing)

Music with Changing Parts (Orange Mountain Music, 2007)

- Philip Glass – Music with Changing Parts

Apollo (Cantaloupe Music, 2012, Firebrand, 2019)

- Brian Eno, Roger Eno, Daniel Lanois arr. Woojun Lee – Apollo

=== Appearances on other albums ===
Hook, Mesh, Stub, Cud (Argo, 1993)

- Graham Fitkin – Mesh

Short Cuts – Breaking the sound Barrier – An Argo Sampler (Argo, 1994)

Includes excerpt from:

- Gavin Bryars – The Archangel Trip (from the album Terminal Velocity, original Argo version)

Also contains excerpts of music from other Argo albums by Graham Fitkin, Michael Nyman, David Byrne and others.

Century XXI UK A–M (New Tone, 1996)

- Steve Martland – Re-mix
- John Godfrey – S.U.S.Y.W.I.M.P.S. (despite the claim on the cover and CD that the piece is Euthanasia...: it is correct in the liner notes)

Bang on a Can plays Louis Andriessen (Cantaloupe Records)

Members of Icebreaker in collaboration with Bang on a Can All-Stars:

- Louis Andriessen – Hoketus
