= List of compositions by Michael Torke =

The following is a complete list of the compositions by Michael Torke.

== By year of composition ==
- Laetus (1982), for piano
- Ceremony of Innocence (1983), for flute, clarinet, violin, cello and piano
- Vanada (1984), for (brass, keyboards and percussion)
- Yellow Pages (1985), for flute, clarinet, violin, cello and piano
- The Harlequins Are Looking at You (1985), for piano trio
- The Directions (1986), chamber opera
- Adjustable Wrench (1987), for chamber ensemble
- Color Music (1985–1988)
  - Ecstatic Orange (1985), for orchestra
  - Bright Blue Music (1985), for orchestra
  - Green (also known as Verdant Music) (1986), for orchestra
  - Purple (1987), for orchestra
  - Ash (1988), for orchestra
- Black and White (1988), for orchestra (ballet)
- Charcoal (1988), for orchestra
- Copper (1988), for brass quintet and orchestra
- Rust (1989), for piano, 11 wind instruments and electric bass
- Slate (1989), for 3 keyboards, 2 percussion and orchestra
- Mass (1990), for baritone, chorus and chamber orchestra
- Bronze (1990), for piano and orchestra
- Music on the Floor (1992), for chamber ensemble
- Chalk (1992), for string quartet
- Run (1992), for orchestra
- Monday and Tuesday (1992), for chamber ensemble
- Four Proverbs (1993), for female voice and chamber ensemble
- King of Hearts (1993), opera for television
- Chrome (1993), for flute and piano
- Piano Concerto (1993), for piano and orchestra
- Saxophone Concerto (1993), for soprano saxophone and orchestra
- Bone (1994), for chamber ensemble
- Javelin (1994), for orchestra
- Nylon for guitar and orchestra
- December (1995), for strings
- July (1995), for saxophone quartet
- Blue Pages (1995), for flute, clarinet, violin, cello and piano
- White Pages (1995), for flute, clarinet, violin, cello and piano
- Telephone Book (1995), for flute, clarinet, violin, cello and piano (Yellow Pages + Blue Pages + White Pages)
- Flint (1995), for two pianos, saxophone quartet, cello and double bass
- Book of Proverbs (1996), for soprano, baritone, SATB choir and orchestra
- Sprite (1996), for flute and piano
- Brick Symphony (1997), for orchestra
- Overnight Mail (1997), for 11 wind instruments, piano and double bass
- Change of Address (1997), for chamber ensemble
- Pentecost (1997), for soprano and orchestra
- Lucent Variations (1998), for orchestra
- Jasper (1998), for orchestra
- Strawberry Fields (1999), opera
- Four Seasons (1999), for soprano, mezzo-soprano, tenor, baritone, adult and children's choirs, and orchestra
- Corner in Manhattan (2000), for string quartet or orchestra
- Two Drinks (2000), for piano
- Grand Central Station (2000), for concert band
- Rapture (2001), for percussion and orchestra
- Five Songs of Solomon (2001), for soprano and piano
- Song of Ezekiel (2001), for SSA (soprano I, soprano II, alto) choir and piano
- An American Abroad (2002), for orchestra
- Song of Isaiah (2002), for soprano and chamber ensemble
- The Contract (2002), for orchestra (ballet)
- The Paradise Project (2002), music theatre piece for voices and tape
- August (2003), for brass quintet
- Bliss (2003), for concert band
- Kellisongs (2003) for soprano and piano
- Four Wheel Drive (2004), for concert band
- An Italian Straw Hat (2004), for orchestra (ballet)
- Two Girls on the Beach... (2005), for woodwind quintet
- After the Forest Fire (2005), for marimba, flute and cello
- Pentecost (2005), for soprano and orchestra
- The Kiss (2006), for concert band
- Heartland (2006), for orchestra
- Blue Pacific (2006), for piano
- Fiji (also known as Tropical) (2007), for chamber ensemble
- Central Park West (2007), opera
- Leda and Zeus (2007), for trombone and piano
- Plans (2008), for soprano, tenor, SATB chorus and orchestra
- Song of Ecclesiastes (2008), for baritone and piano
- Mojave (2009), for marimba and either string quartet or orchestra or wind instrument ensemble
- Cactus (2009), for harp, violin and orchestra
- Tahiti (2009), for chamber ensemble
- May and June (2010), for saxophone quartet
- Wild Grass (2011), for harp and wind instrument ensemble
- Tiger in the Sun (2011), for brass
- Torque Series (2012), for concert band
- Archipelago (2012), for orchestra
- Daffodils (2012), for flute and piano
- Pop-pea (2012), after Monteverdi, for rock band
- House and Home (2012), for soprano and piano
- The Bell Invites Me (2012), for carillon
- From Many, One (2012)
- Oracle (2013), for orchestra
- Bliss (2013), for concert band
- Iphigenia (2013), for 2 clarinets, 2 bassoons, 2 trumpets, cello and double bass
- Winter Trio (2013), for piano trio
- Concerto for Orchestra (2014)
- Miami Grands (2014), for ten pianos
- Winter's Tale (2014), for cello and orchestra
- Three Manhattan Bridges (2015), for piano and orchestra
- Unconquered (2016), for orchestra
- Spoon Bread (2016) for violin and piano
- West (2016) for bassoon and orchestra
- South (2016) for oboe and orchestra
- East (2016) for clarinet and orchestra
- Sylvan (2017) for orchestra
- Music at Night (2017) for SATB chorus and orchestra
- October (2017) for bass clarinet and string quartet
- Sky (2018) for violin and orchestra
- Being (2019) for chamber ensemble
- Psalms and Canticles (2020) for singer and ensemble
- Time (2021) for 22 musicians
- Unseen (2022) for orchestra
- Sessions, 3 A.M. (2023) for piano
