= James Woodrow (musician) =

English guitarist

James Woodrow (born 1961) is an English guitarist, active primarily in classical, contemporary classical music and jazz fields, and equally adept on classical and electric guitar.

== Biography ==
Woodrow trained at the Royal Northern College of Music. After graduating, he rapidly became established as one of the country's leading electric and classical guitarists in contemporary and classical music in London, as well as a performer on mandolin, lute and bass guitar.

== Contemporary work ==
Since 1991 he has been a leading member of the ensemble Icebreaker, where he has been joint musical director since 2006. With Icebreaker he has performed at the Carnegie Hall in Stewart Wallace's concerto for Icebreaker, The Book of Five, as well as appearances at the Lincoln Center in New York, the Kennedy Center in Washington, London's South Bank Centre and extensively in the UK, Europe and the USA.

In 1993 he was invited to join the Gavin Bryars Ensemble and in 2001 he became a member of A Change of Light, an ensemble project set up by Icebreaker's cellist (and other joint musical director) Audrey Riley with Icebreaker keyboard player Andrew Zolinsky.

Other ensembles he has performed with as soloist and ensemble member include the London Chamber Symphony, the Birmingham Contemporary Music Group, London Sinfonietta, Lontano, the LSO, Almeida Opera, Music Projects London, the BBC Symphony Orchestra, the BBC Singers and The New London Chamber Choir. He has been associated with the music of Bang on a Can composer Michael Gordon, David Lang and Julia Wolfe in performances with Concerto Cologne and the Basel Sinfonietta of Decasia, Lost Objects and Shelter. He is also a member of former Microdisney and Fatima Mansions front man Cathal Coughlan's new band, Grand Necropolitan Quartet.

== Work with dance ==
Woodrow has often worked with dance companies. He was a member and featured soloist for the Merce Cunningham Dance Company from 1999 until 2011, most notably in performances of Gavin Bryars's work Bi-ped, and his playing was featured in the CD of Merce Cunningham Dance Company music, released before the company closed. He has also featured regularly for Richard Alston, including solo performances of Steve Reich's Electric Counterpoint on electric guitar, works by Jo Kondo and Denis Gaultier on guitar and mandolin, as well as 17th Century works for solo lute.

Other dance companies he has worked with include London Contemporary Dance, Rambert, Phoenix Dance Company, Siobhan Davies, Shobana Jeyasingh, with whom he performed a work for solo guitar and electronics specially written for him by Michael Nyman, Random Dance, Royal Ballet and Scottish Ballet. He has also worked on the music for three projects with Opera North: tango music by Astor Piazzolla, Nothing Like The Sun with the Royal Shakespeare Company, revolving round Shakespeare's sonnets, and a Tom Waits-based project Mercy and Grand.

== Jazz and other work ==
Woodrow is also active as a jazz guitarist, amongst others in his own quartet CandyTime, with whom he has released two albums. He also performs on classical guitar in contemporary and older classical repertoire, with his own Kammermusik ensemble.

He is also active as a classical guitarist in solo recitals, including works by Tippett, Britten, Elliott Carter, Jo Kondo, Thomas Daniel Schlee, Takemitsu, and Milhaud, as well as Baroque repertoire by Bach, Denis Gaultier and Froberger.

Frequent appearances on BBC Radio 3 include performances of Tippett's The Knot Garden, Stockhausen’s Gruppen, John Buller’s Proenca, Richard Dubugnon's Double Piano Concerto for the Labeque sisters, and the Interludes for guitar composed especially for him by Howard Skempton.
