= Neil O'Connor (musician) =

Irish electronic musician and composer

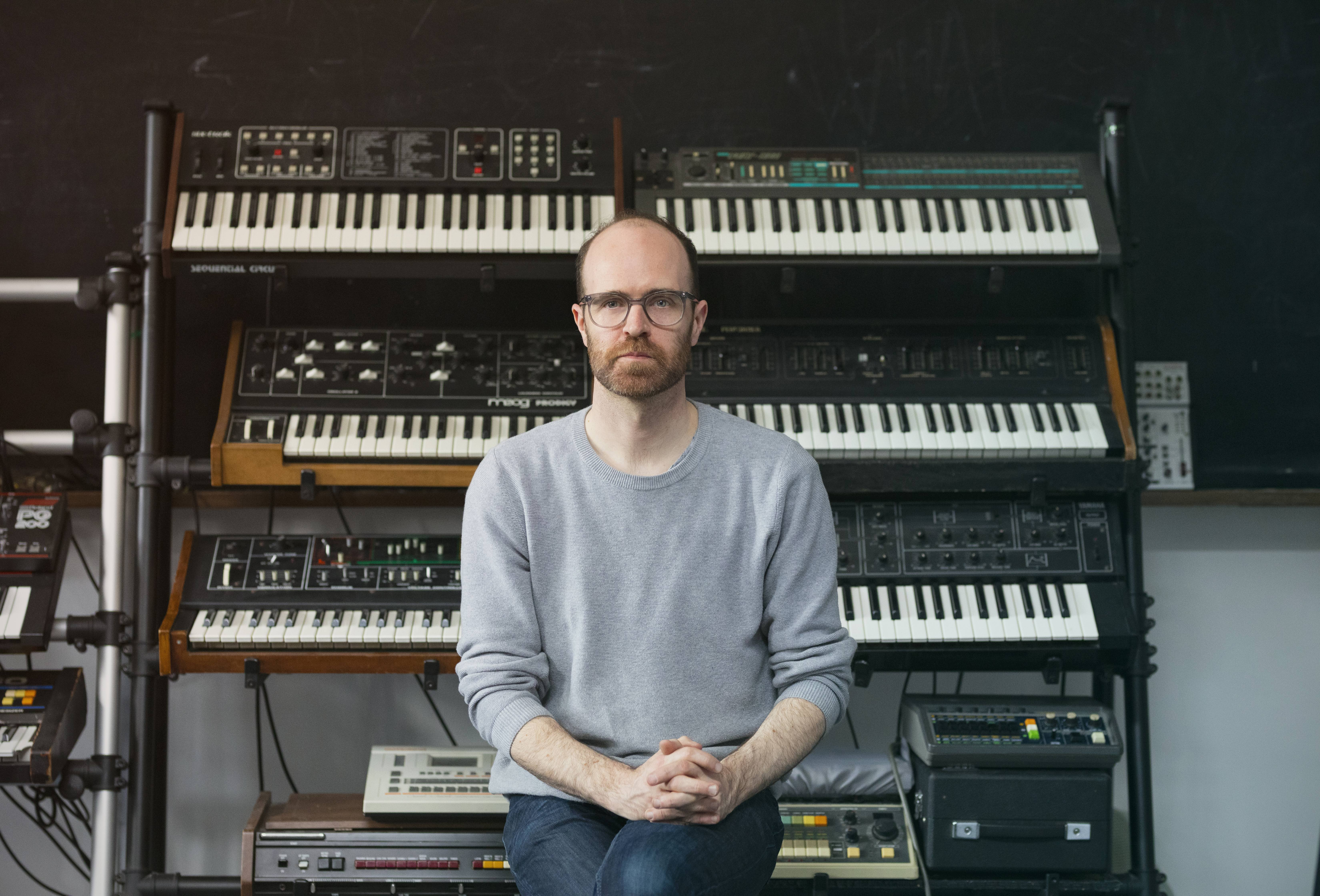

Background information
- Born: Neil O'Connor; 1979 (age 46–47); Ireland
- Origin: Dublin, Ireland
- Genres: Electronic; ambient; electroacoustic; experimental; post-rock
- Occupations: Musician; composer; producer; academic; researcher
- Instruments: Synthesizer; keyboards; drums; percussion; vibraphone; electronics
- Years active: 1998–present
- Labels: Scintilla Recordings, Trust Me I'm a Thief, D1 Recordings
- Website: neiloconnor.org

Neil O'Connor (born 1979) is an Irish composer, multi-instrumentalist, electronic musician and academic based in Dublin. He is best known for his long-running solo projects Somadrone (active from the late 1990s to 2018) and Ordnance Survey (from 2018 onwards), and has also worked as a member of Irish bands including The Redneck Manifesto, Jape and with David Kitt.

== Early life and career ==
O'Connor was born in Ireland in 1979 and has been involved in experimental, electronic and electroacoustic music for more than two decades. He began releasing music under the Somadrone moniker in the late 1990s, with the Let's Depart EP appearing in 2000.

Alongside his solo work, O'Connor has played keyboards and percussion for Dublin math rock band The Redneck Manifesto, and has performed with Jape and David Kitt.

== Somadrone (1998–2018) ==
Somadrone was O'Connor's primary solo vehicle for two decades. The project's early albums, including Fuzzing Away to a Whisper (2005) and Of Pattern and Purpose (2007), were characterised by "twitchy electronics and ambient vibraphone textures." Over time the project evolved to incorporate vocals, guitar and synthesizers, blending elements of shoegaze and house.

Stated influences across the Somadrone catalogue included British electronica duo Plaid, Chicago post-rock group Tortoise, German electronic acts such as To Rococo Rot and Kreidler, and the hauntological pop of Broadcast.

The final Somadrone album, Wellpark Avenue (2018), was described as a homage to Broadcast and marked both a return to the more melodic style of the early Somadrone records and the end of the project. Critics have compared O'Connor's work to that of Brian Eno and Ryuichi Sakamoto.

== Ordnance Survey (2018–present) ==
In 2018 O'Connor retired the Somadrone name and launched Ordnance Survey, a project that returned to the more ambient, collaborative side of his work. The debut album Relative Phase (2019) was recorded at Dublin's National Concert Hall over the course of a year and featured collaborations with Seán Mac Erlaine, Linda Buckley, Kate Ellis and John McEntire of Tortoise.

The follow-up, Ampere (2020), broadened O'Connor's range of collaborators into Irish traditional and folk music, featuring Dónal Lunny, singer Muireann Nic Amhlaoibh, Lankum's fiddle player Cormac Mac Diarmada, pedal steel guitarist David Murphy, and the Crash Ensemble.

Unable to record with collaborators during the COVID-19 pandemic, O'Connor assembled Field Work (2021) from field recordings he had made around Dublin together with snippets from RTÉ television and radio archives, including a recording of a sean-nós singer made in West Kerry in the 1950s. Song titles referenced specific Dublin and coastal locations such as "Connolly Station", "Drumcondra", "Sandycove Beach" and "Howth", exploring the concept of hauntology as articulated by French philosopher Jacques Derrida.

Subsequent Ordnance Survey releases have included Nomos: Ó Riada Reimagined (2022), a reimagining of music by Irish composer Seán Ó Riada; Turas (2023), recorded in Irish wedge and passage tombs including Newgrange; Biofeedback Suite (2024); the Music for Shared System EP (2025); and Autotelic (2026).

== Academic work ==
As a researcher, academic and composer, O'Connor's electroacoustic work has been performed at MOMA in New York, IRCAM in Paris, and the Institute of Contemporary Arts in London. He has held residencies at the Massachusetts Museum of Contemporary Art and at EMS – the Swedish Institute of Electro-Acoustic Music in Stockholm. He has also worked or collaborated with members of the Crash Ensemble, the RTÉ National Symphony Orchestra, the Philip Glass Ensemble and the Glenn Branca Ensemble.

His electroacoustic works have received awards and mentions at the Noroit-Léonce Petitot competition in Arras, France; the Euphonie d'Or of the Concours International de Musique Électroacoustique (Bourges, France); the Musica Nova Electroacoustic Music Competition in the Czech Republic; and the Concurso Internacional de Música Eletroacústica de São Paulo.

== Discography ==
=== As Somadrone ===
- Let's Depart EP (2000)
- Fuzzing Away to a Whisper (2005)
- Of Pattern and Purpose (2007)
- 10:1 Noises EP (2009, split with Locus Solus)
- Music for Bathyscaphes EP (2010, split with Locus Solus)
- Depth of Field (2010)
- Atlantic EP (2012)
- The First Wave (2013)
- Oracle (2015)
- Mirror EP (2017)
- Wellpark Avenue (2018)
- Archival 01 EP (2021)

=== As Ordnance Survey ===
- Relative Phase (2019)
- Ampere (2020)
- Live at Town Hall EP (2020)
- Field Work (2021)
- Nomos: Ó Riada Reimagined (2022)
- Turas (2023)
- Biofeedback Suite (2024)
- Music for Shared System EP (2025)
- Autotelic (2026)

=== Under own name ===
- Ensemble & Electronics (2018)
- Octophonic Works (2018)
- Electroacoustic Works Vol. 1 (2019)
- Oscillator Suite (2023)

=== Other projects ===
- The Empress Field – Vol. 1 EP (2017)
- The Empress Field – Vol. 2 EP (2019)
- Without Name OST (2017, with Gavin O'Brien)
