= Capricorn =

Capricorn (pl. capricorni or capricorns) may refer to:

- Capricornus, a constellation often called Capricorn
- Capricorn (astrology), an astrological sign of the zodiac

== Places ==
- Capricorn and Bunker Group, islands of the southern Great Barrier Reef, Australia
- Capricorn District Municipality, Limpopo province, South Africa
- Capricorn Caves, Rockhampton, Queensland, Australia

== Animals ==
- Capricorn, an animal from the ibex family, particularly the Alpine ibex
- Capricornis, a genus of goat-like or antelope-like animals

== Arts, entertainment, and media ==
=== Fictional characters ===
- Capricorn (comics), several Marvel Comics characters
- Capricorn (Inkworld), Inkheart character

=== Music ===
==== Groups and labels ====
- Capricorn Records, an American record label active 1969–1979
- Capricorn (ensemble), a British chamber ensemble active 1973–2000

==== Albums ====
- Capricorn (Jay Chou album), 2008
- Capricorn (Trevor Powers album), 2020
- Capricorn (Mike Tramp album), 1997

==== Songs ====
- "Capricorn", a song by IQ from their 1997 concept album Subterranea
- "Capricorn", a song by Barclay James Harvest from the album Eyes of the Universe
- "Capricorn", a song by Motörhead from the album Overkill
- "Capricorn" (song), a song by Vampire Weekend on the album Only God Was Above Us
- "Capricorn (A Brand New Name)", a 2002 single by 30 Seconds to Mars from their self-titled album

=== Other uses in arts, entertainment, and media ===
- Capricorn, a 1988 manga series created by Johji Manabe
- Capricorn One, a 1977 thriller film

== Brands and enterprises ==
- Capricorn (microprocessor), a family of microprocessors used in the HP series 80 scientific microcomputers
- Capricorn, one of the names for the Virgin Atlantic GlobalFlyer
- Capricorn Investment Holdings, an umbrella for the Capricorn group of companies

== Other uses ==
- Capricorn, a ship that on January 28, 1980, collided with and sank the USCGC Blackthorn (WLB-391)
- Capricorn Africa Society, a pressure group in British African colonies

== See also ==
- Capricornia (disambiguation)
- Tropic of Capricorn (disambiguation)
