= Andrew Zolinsky =

Andrew Zolinsky is a British pianist.

Zolinsky won the first prize in the San Francisco International Piano Concerto Competition. Performances have included a concert with the Royal Philharmonic Orchestra, London Concert Orchestra, Sinfonia 21 and the New London Orchestra. He has worked with conductors including Diego Masson, Martyn Brabbins, Nicholas Cleobury, Ronald Corp and Simon Joly. Zolinsky's music has been broadcast on BBC Radio 3, and he has also given solo recitals on Classic FM, German Radio, Czech Radio and two recitals of contemporary Irish music for BBC Radio Ulster.

In the field of contemporary music Zolinsky has worked with Composers' Ensemble, Capricorn, Eos. Since 1997 has been a member of the British group Icebreaker and with Icebreaker's cellist Audrey Riley and guitarist James Woodrow he has been a member of the multi-media project A Change of Light since 2001. He has worked with composers including Simon Holt, Louis Andriessen, Poul Ruders, Michael Finnissy, Martin Butler and John Godfrey. In 2005 he gave the first performance of a new set of pieces specially written for Zolinsky by Michael Zev Gordon. He has had an especially close relationship with David Lang, who wrote the piano concerto Fur for Zolinsky in 2005. He has also given the première of Lang's Memory Pieces in 2000 and Psalms without Words in 2003. In 2005 he gave the London premiere, with the BBC Symphony Orchestra and of Unsuk Chin's Piano Concerto.
