= Zolinsky =

Zolinsky is a surname. Notable people with the surname include:

- Andrew Zolinsky (fl. 1997), British pianist
- Henry Zolinsky (1901–2001), American poet
