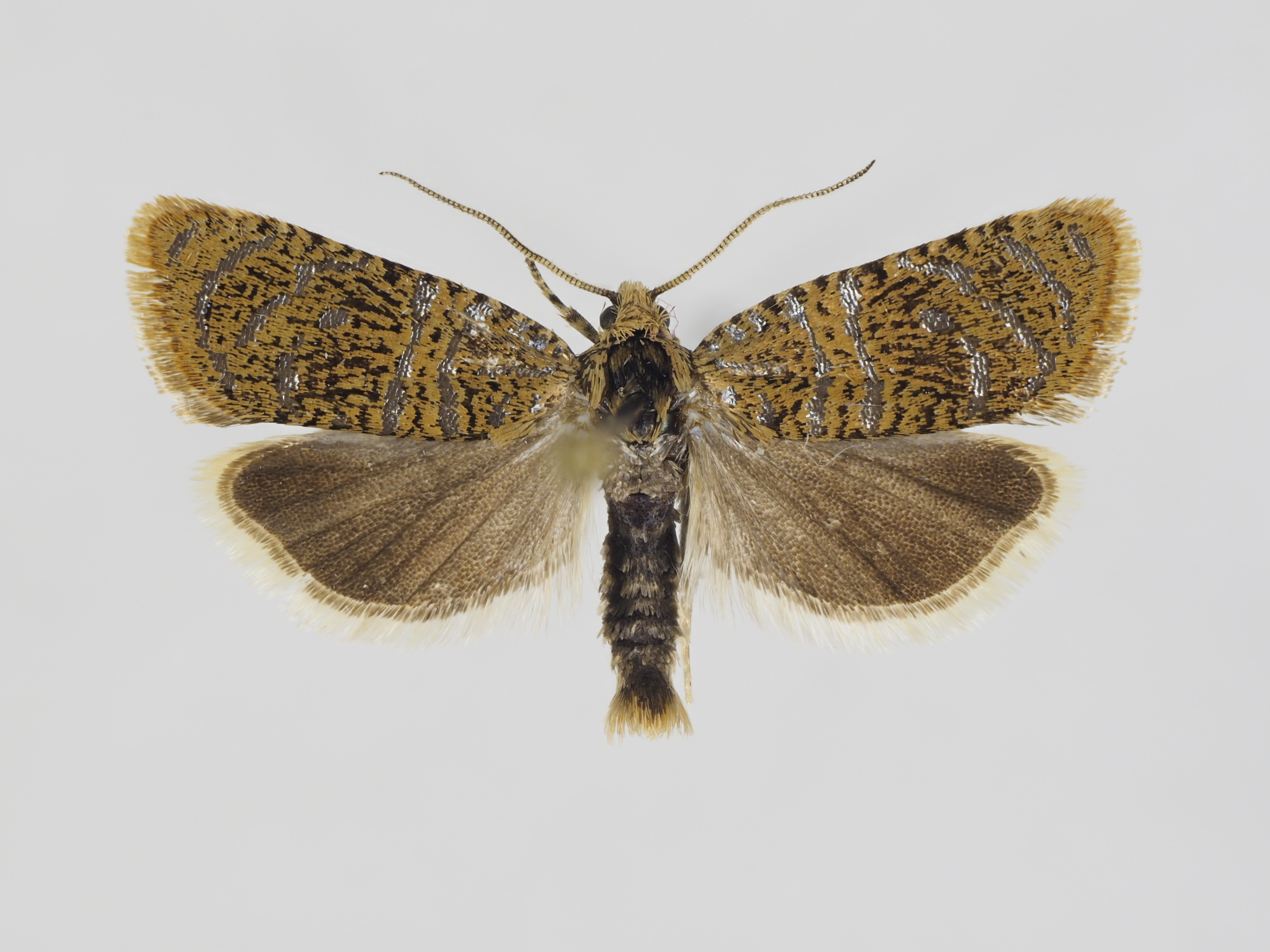

Scientific classification
- Kingdom: Animalia
- Phylum: Arthropoda
- Class: Insecta
- Order: Lepidoptera
- Family: Tortricidae
- Genus: Capricornia
- Species: C. boisduvaliana

Binomial name
- Capricornia boisduvaliana (Duponchel in Godart, 1836)

= Capricornia boisduvaliana =

Species of moth

Capricornia boisduvaliana is a moth belonging to the family Tortricidae. The species was first described by Philogène Auguste Joseph Duponchel in 1836.

It is native to Eurasia.
