= Icebreaker (band) =

British minimalist band

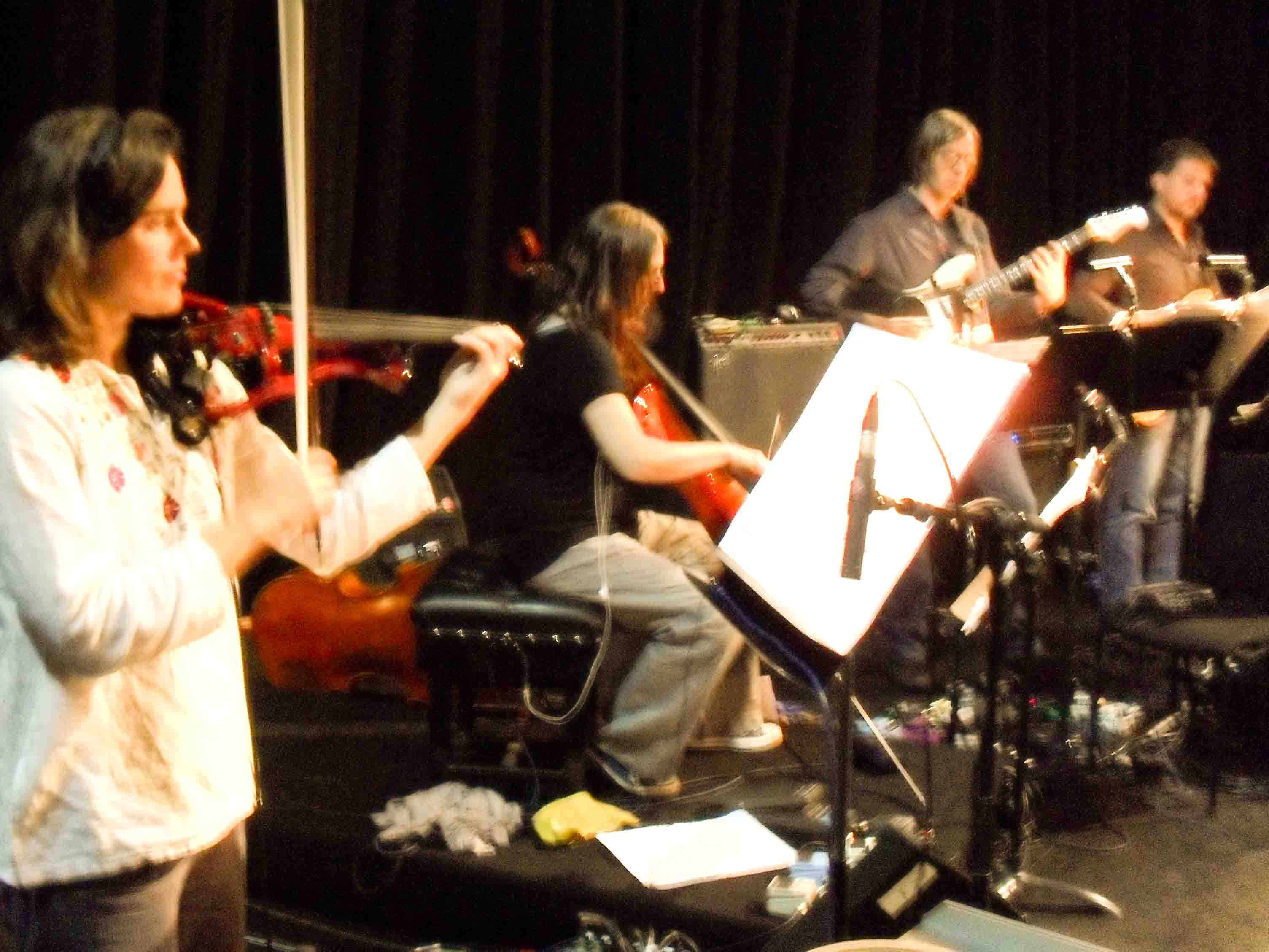
- Icebreaker live at QEH 2010

Background information
- Origin: London, England
- Genres: Postminimalism, minimalism, totalism
- Years active: 1989–
- Labels: Cantaloupe Music; Orange Mountain Music; New Tone Records; Donemus; Argo
- Members: James Poke; Rowland Sutherland; Christian Forshaw; Bradley Grant; Dominic Saunders; Andrew Zolinsky; Walter Fabeck; Emma Welton; Audrey Riley; Dan Gresson; James Woodrow; Pete Wilson; Mel; Martyn Hall
- Past members: (selected:); John Godfrey; Damian LeGassick; Arun Bharali; Ian Watson; Richard Craig; Katherine Pendry; Tom Armstrong; Joanna Parker; Tracey Goldsmith; Darragh Morgan; Christian Forshaw; Ernst Zettl
- Website: icebreaker.org.uk

Icebreaker is a UK-based new music ensemble founded by James Poke and John Godfrey. They interpret new music, specialising in a post-minimal and "totalist" repertoire. Icebreaker always play amplified and have a reputation for playing, by classical standards, "seriously loud". They have expanded their repertoire to include non-classical material, particularly in their version of the Brian Eno album Apollo, a project based on the music of Kraftwerk, and music by Scott Walker.

== Biography ==
=== Founding and musical identity ===
Icebreaker was formed in 1989 to play at the new Dutch music festival in York. The group consists of 12 musicians, with an instrumentation that includes panpipes, saxophones, electric violin and cello, guitars, percussion, drums, accordion and keyboards as well as a sound engineer and production manager. Richard Witts who is consultant to the ensemble.

Their repertoire encompasses music by a variety of well-known composers, including Louis Andriessen, Julia Wolfe, Brian Eno, Philip Glass, Michael Gordon, Yannis Kyriakides, David Lang, Steve Martland, Michael Nyman, Steve Reich, Donnacha Dennehy, and Diderik Wagenaar. Icebreaker's unusual instrumentation gives the band's music a distinctive sound and allows the blending of contemporary classical, rock and alternative music. The instrumentation evolved from the line up of the Dutch group Hoketus, who had operated between 1977 and 1987, and served as an inspiration and model for the formation of the group. The presence of pairs of panpipes and saxophones derives from Icebreaker's performances of several works from the by now defunct Hoketus's repertoire, including the eponymous work by Louis Andriessen.

=== Performances ===
Icebreaker have made concert appearances in the UK, US and Europe, including the Huddersfield Contemporary Music Festival, the Warsaw, Aarhus, Ghent, Grenoble and Budapest festivals, Sonorities in Belfast, the Baltic Gaida Festival and the NYYD Festival in Estonia, as well as a dedicated Icebreaker festival with the Wiener Musik Galerie in Vienna. In London they have appeared at Meltdown, the ICA, the Place Theatre, the South Bank, the Barbican, the Warehouse, Ocean and the Almeida, among other venues. They have appeared on two Arts Council Contemporary Music Network tours of England. United States appearances include New York City's Bang on a Can Festival, the Lincoln Center Festival, and a performance at Carnegie Hall with the American Composers' Orchestra in Stewart Wallace's The Book of Five.

=== Recordings ===
Since 2005 most of Icebreaker's albums have been released on the New York-based label Cantaloupe Music. 2005 saw the release of Cranial Pavement, including music by John Godfrey, Richard Craig, Yannis Kyriakides and Conlon Nancarrow, as well as the worldwide release of the new version of Michael Gordon's Trance. This 52-minute work was originally released on Argo in 1996 and has been completely re-worked and re-mixed for the Cantaloupe version.

Icebreaker's first album Terminal Velocity (music by Andriessen, Gordon, Lang, Gavin Bryars and Damian LeGassick), also originally on Argo, has also been produced in a remastered version for Cantaloupe.

In 2007 Icebreaker's version of Philip Glass's Music with Changing Parts was released on Glass's own label Orange Mountain Music.

Other albums include Rogue's Gallery (NewTone), with works by Andriessen, Lang, Godfrey, Michael Torke and Steve Martland; a portrait of Diderik Wagenaar (Composers' Voice) and Extraction (between the lines), containing music by LeGassick and Gordon McPherson plus a remix by Mel. Contributions to compilation albums include works by Graham Fitkin (Argo), Steve Martland and John Godfrey (Century XXI A – M / NewTone).

Icebreaker's recording of Apollo, their recent project based on the Brian Eno album Apollo: Atmospheres & Soundtracks, was released in June 2012 on the Cantaloupe. It was re-released on the Firebrand label on 18 July 2019, to coincide with Icebreaker's performance of the work at Matera European City of Culture, where Roger Eno made a guest appearance on piano.

In late 2020, Icebreaker announced a project to release a digital track every month for the whole of 2021, marking their first new releases since 2012. The project started with re-releases of the three tracks previously on compilation albums, by Fitkin, Martland and Godfrey, followed by releases of newer material recorded in recent live performances, culminating in a release of Philip Glass's Rubric in December 2021.

=== Work with dance ===
Tanzwerk Nürnberg, West Australian Ballet and the Pacific Northwest Ballet of Seattle have used Icebreaker's recordings for performances. In June 1998, Ashley Page created Cheating, Lying, Stealing, featuring Icebreaker as guest performers, for The Royal Ballet at Sadler's Wells, a programme which was revived in September/October 2003 and again in April 2009 for Scottish Ballet. AtaXia, a collaboration with Wayne McGregor's company Random Dance, based on Trance, premiered in Sadler's Wells, London in June 2004 with further performances in Amsterdam and New York.

=== Multimedia work ===
The 2003/4 season saw a major multimedia collaboration with the renowned Dutch ensemble Orkest de Volharding, and singer Cristina Zavalloni, entitled Big Noise. The project, consisting of four new commissions from leading composers from Britain and the Netherlands (Yannis Kyriakides, Diderik Wagenaar, Joe Cutler and Cornelis de Bondt, each working in conjunction with a video artist (HC Gilje, Hexstatic, Jaap Drupsteen and Thomas Hadley respectively), toured major venues in the UK and the Netherlands.

Other projects have included a further performance of The Book of Five with the Bochum Symphony Orchestra in Germany, recording the music to the independent American film Book of Love, and further work with film.

=== Educational work ===
They have been resident ensemble at the Dartington International Summer School for the advanced composition course led by Louis Andriessen, and have held composition workshops for the SPNM in Bangor and Belfast as well as additional workshops in New York and London. In June 2005 they took part in the Popular Music course at Goldsmiths College in association with John Paul Jones. In April 2009 they performed four new student commissions for the Royal Conservatoire of Scotland (RSAMD) in Glasgow.

=== Internet radio show ===
Since 2006 Icebreaker have had a monthly show on Brighton-based totallyradio.com, including interviews with composers and playing a wide range of music in mixed and contrasting genres.

== Recent work ==
In 2005 Icebreaker were invited to revive Philip Glass's epic 1970 work Music with Changing Parts, which had remained unperformed since the early 1980s. Icebreaker's recording of the piece, based on material recorded live at Dartington College of Arts, was released in spring 2007 on the Orange Mountain Music label.

In 2009 Icebreaker played further performances of Cheating, Lying, Stealing with Scottish Ballet, and appeared at the Huddersfield Contemporary Music Festival in two concerts celebrating Louis Andriessen's 70th birthday.

=== Collaboration with London's Science Museum ===
In July 2009 Icebreaker, with guest B. J. Cole on pedal steel guitar, premiered a new arrangement (by Woojun Lee) of Brian Eno's Apollo album, consisting of music by Brian Eno, Roger Eno and Daniel Lanois, at the IMAX cinema at London's Science Museum, alongside Al Reinert's film For All Mankind, for which the music was originally written. An expanded version of the arrangement received further performances at the Brighton Festival in May 2010, before touring later in the year. The album of the music was released in June 2012.

2014 saw the launch of the band's Kraftwerk Uncovered project. Going under the full title Kraftwerk Uncovered: A Future Past, the live show consists of reworkings and re-imaginings of Kraftwerk's music by German electronic artist J. Peter Schwalm, with a film by Schwalm's long-term video collaborator Sophie Clements, working with Toby Cornish. The project was another collaboration with the Science Museum, and received its first performance at the museum's IMAX cinema in January 2014, before touring around the UK and Ireland.

Icebreaker are working with the Science Museum on a further collaborative project, with contributions from Bryars, Shiva Feshareki and Sarah Angliss with performances planned for Bradford and London in March 2025.

=== Other projects ===
2014/15 also featured the Recycled Project, including new works by Ed Bennett, Roy Carroll, Paul Whitty, Craig Vear, Linda Buckley and a new arrangement of a piece by Julia Wolfe. with performances in Canterbury, Oxford, Birmingham and Guildford.

2016 saw the launch of their live version of Scott Walker's Epizootics, arranged by Audrey Riley. Scott Walker had not performed live for decades, but gave permission for this new version of his work, which featured Walker's recorded voice in conjunction with live performance and video, and was premiered at Milton Court at the Barbican, London, in November 2016.

2017/18 featured the System Restart project, featuring music by six women composers, Anna Meredith, Jobina Tinnemans, Elizabeth Kelly, Kerry Andrew, Linda Buckley and Kate Moore, which toured in the UK and the Netherlands. Kate Moore's work for the project won the prestigious Matthijs Vermeulen Award, the first time in its 45-year existence that it was won by a woman.

=== Apollo revisited ===
In the summer of 2019, Icebreaker played further performances of Apollo to coincide with the 50th anniversary of the Moon landings (and the re-release of the Apollo album), the first of which, at Matera in Italy, one of the European Cities of Culture 2019, featured a guest appearance by Roger Eno. Further performances took place at the Barbican Centre in London and other venues in the UK, Ireland and the Czech Republic.

Kate Moore was commissioned by Icebreaker in conjunction with the European Space Agency to write a new space-themed piece for performance at ESTEC, supported by Dutch state funding body Fonds PodiumKunsten, in conjunction with further performances of Apollo and Epizootics. The piece, entitled Magenta Magnetic, was premiered at the Baltic Gaida Festival in Vilnius in October 2019, but further performances were postponed as a result of the COVID-19 pandemic.

== Critical appraisal ==
=== Early critical response ===
Critical response to Icebreaker has generally been positive. Their London debut in 1989 was greeted by The Guardian and The Independent in enthusiastic terms: Robert Maycock in The Independent felt that "there is plenty of material here for British audiences to catch up with and Icebreaker have what it takes to deliver it," whilst Meirion Bowen wrote in The Guardian that "Icebreaker deserve an enthusiastic following." Michael Dervan, writing in The Irish Times, described it as "music for the aurally challenged ... or the braindead" and "ideal for the deaf and stoned".

=== Volume ===
A number of critics have had difficulty with the very loud volumes of Icebreaker's concerts, which, whilst not excessively loud by rock standards, have challenged the ears of more classical critics. Keith Potter, a critic who has often praised Icebreaker's work ("Icebreaker's performers ... play with a passionate commitment as well as the requisite and highly demanding rhythmic precision",) nevertheless complained of the high volume of Icebreaker's 1996 concert at London's Queen Elizabeth Hall: "This concert ... was loud. Seriously loud. It was also designed ... to 'ramp up the audience's visual input to an equal energy level' to that of the sound. ... I found all this rather too much to take." For Brian Hunt, writing in The Daily Telegraph, an April 1995 Icebreaker concert was "too loud and not short enough." Others have been more enthusiastic: for Christopher Lambton, in The Guardian, a 2003 concert was "loud and all-enveloping, offering an experience closer to a rock concert: Icebreaker... creates the blueprint for live contemporary music."

=== Releases ===
Icebreaker's albums have met with a very positive response. Terminal Velocity was described by Joshua Kosman in the San Francisco Chronicle as an "electrifying new disc ... superb" and it was described by the American Record Guide as "a stimulating, well-filled disc". Trance was also well-received, particularly in its remastered version: the BBC Music Magazine referred to its "furious precision", whilst Gramophone described parts of it as "genuinely mesmeric".

Responses to Music with Changing Parts included a 4-star review in The Times, and an appreciative review in The Wire ("appealing ... warmth ... vividness"), although Andrew Clements was less enthusiastic in The Guardian, awarding it two stars.

T J Medrek, in the Boston Herald, wrote about Cranial Pavement and the re-released Terminal Velocity that "Icebreaker's music is not only marvelous ear candy but also work of real structure and substance, as demonstrated in two superb new discs".

Jim Farber in the New York Daily News described Apollo: Atmospheres and Soundtracks as "sumptuous"., whilst the New York Music Daily called it "mesmerizing ... brilliant", writing that Icebreaker's version "enhances the hypnotic, enveloping, raptly warm ambience of the original, giving it a more organic feel".

=== Further international response ===
Icebreaker have garnered further plaudits in the United States and Europe. For Allan Kozinn in The New York Times, the group was "unabashedly virtuosic"; Kyle Gann in The Village Voice described them as "rhythmically engrossing"; Alan Rich in Los Angeles Weekly as "amazing ... high-powered"; and Tristram Lozaw in the Boston Herald as "a harmolodic carnival of battling textures, symphonic discombobulations, and noisy innovations, all delivered with the visceral force of the best rock'n'roll".

In Europe Icebreaker have been described as "mercilessly exact" (Der Standard, Vienna); "impressive ... fascinating ... almost ecstatic" (NRC Handelsblad, Amsterdam); and "commanding ... impressive" (Niedersächsische Allgemeine).

David Bowie cited Icebreaker in an interview for the magazine Q in November 2006, stating that he "would drive a mile" to see Icebreaker play live, describing music from Cranial Pavement as phenomenal.

== Members ==
- James Poke (artistic director, flutes, panpipes, wind-synthesiser, keyboard programming)
- Rowland Sutherland (flutes, panpipes, voice)
- Bradley Grant (saxophones, clarinets)
- Dominic Saunders (keyboards)
- Andrew Zolinsky (keyboards)
- Walter Fabeck (keyboards)
- Karen Street (accordion, saxophones)
- Emma Welton (electric violin)
- Audrey Riley (electric cello, keyboards)
- Dan Gresson (percussion, drums)
- James Woodrow (guitar, bass guitar)
- Pete Wilson (bass guitar)
- Ian Mellish (production assistant)
- Martyn Hall (sound engineer)

== Discography ==
=== Albums ===
- Official Bootleg (ICC, 1991, live album, cassette only)
- Terminal Velocity (Argo, 1994)
- Trance (Argo, 1996)
- Rogue's Gallery (New Tone, 1997)
- Diderik Wagenaar (Composers' Voice / Donemus, 2001)
- Extraction (between the lines, 2001)
- Trance (Cantaloupe, 2004) (Remix and re-master of Argo album)
- Cranial Pavement (Cantaloupe, 2005)
- Terminal Velocity (Cantaloupe, 2005) (Re-master of Argo album)
- Music with Changing Parts (Orange Mountain, 2007)
- Apollo (Cantaloupe Music, 2012, Firebrand 2019)

=== Digital singles in 2021 ===
- Mesh (Rookery, January 2021) (Re-master of track from Hook, Mesh, Stub, Cud)
- Re-mix (Rookery, February 2021) (Re-master of track from Century XXI UK A–M)
- S.U.S.Y.W.I.M.P.S. (Rookery, March 2021) (Re-master of track from Century XXI UK A–M)
- Nautilus (Rookery, April 2021)
- Big, Beautiful, Dark & Scary (Rookery, May 2021)
- Link (Rookery, June 2021)
- Azure (Rookery, July 2021)
- The, What is it? The Golden Eagle? (Rookery, August 2021)
- Black Origami (Rookery, September 2021)
- The Vapours (Rookery, October 2021)
- The Dam (Rookery, November 2021)
- Rubric (Rookery, December 2021)

=== Appearances on other albums ===
- Hook, Mesh, Stub, Cud (Argo, 1993)
- Short Cuts – Breaking the sound Barrier – An Argo Sampler (Argo, 1994)
- Century XXI UK A–M (New Tone, 1996)
- Bang on a Can plays Louis Andriessen (Cantaloupe)
