= Linda Buckley =

Irish composer (born 1979)

Linda Buckley (born 4 April 1979) is an Irish art music composer. Her work has been performed by the BBC Symphony Orchestra, RTÉ National Symphony Orchestra, Crash Ensemble, Icebreaker and Iarla Ó Lionaird. She has received a Fulbright scholarship for New York University and the 2011 Frankfurt Visual Music Award for her composition Silk Chroma to visuals by Maura McDonnell.

== Career ==
Born at the Old Head of Kinsale, County Cork, Buckley studied at University College Cork and graduated with an Master of Arts in music and media technology from Trinity College Dublin. She studied composition with John Godfrey, David Harold Cox, Donnacha Dennehy, and Roger Doyle.

In 2008, Buckley featured in a "Composer's Choice" series of concerts at the National Concert Hall, Dublin. She was RTÉ lyric fm's resident composer during 2011–2012. Her work featured in the 2017 New Music Dublin Festival at the National Concert Hall, Dublin and by the Crash Ensemble at the 2012 Huddersfield Contemporary Music Festival.

In 2016, Buckley worked with uilleann piper David Power on the composition Antarctica which premiered that year at the Kilkenny Arts Festival. The Irish Times's Gemma Tipton wrote that "the music is beguiling."

In 2017, she was interviewed about her work by Iarla Ó Lionáird as part of the RTÉ lyric fm series Vocal Chords: In Conversation.

In 2018, her work Discordia was performed at the Barbican Theatre. Later that year she composed a score for the 1922 film Nosferatu with her sister Irene by request of the Union Chapel, London. The same year composer Christopher Fox wrote in the Cambridge University Press publication Tempo about her contributions to modern composition.

Buckley has lectured in composition at the Royal Conservatoire of Scotland, Royal Irish Academy of Music and Pulse College Dublin.

== Reception ==
Buckley has been described by music writer Bob Gilmore as "a leading figure in the younger generation of Irish composers" and by Tim Rutherford-Johnson as "a combination of bold assertiveness and a smooth, glassy elegance".
