= Hystrichoscelus =

Scientific classification
- Kingdom: Animalia
- Phylum: Arthropoda
- Class: Insecta
- Order: Lepidoptera
- Family: Tortricidae
- Tribe: Olethreutini
- Genus: Hystrichoscelus; Walsingham, 1900

Genus of tortrix moths

Hystrichoscelus is a genus of moths belonging to the subfamily Olethreutinae of the family Tortricidae.

== Species ==
- Hystrichoscelus spathanum Walsingham, 1900

== See also ==
- List of Tortricidae genera
