= Rowland Sutherland =

British flautist

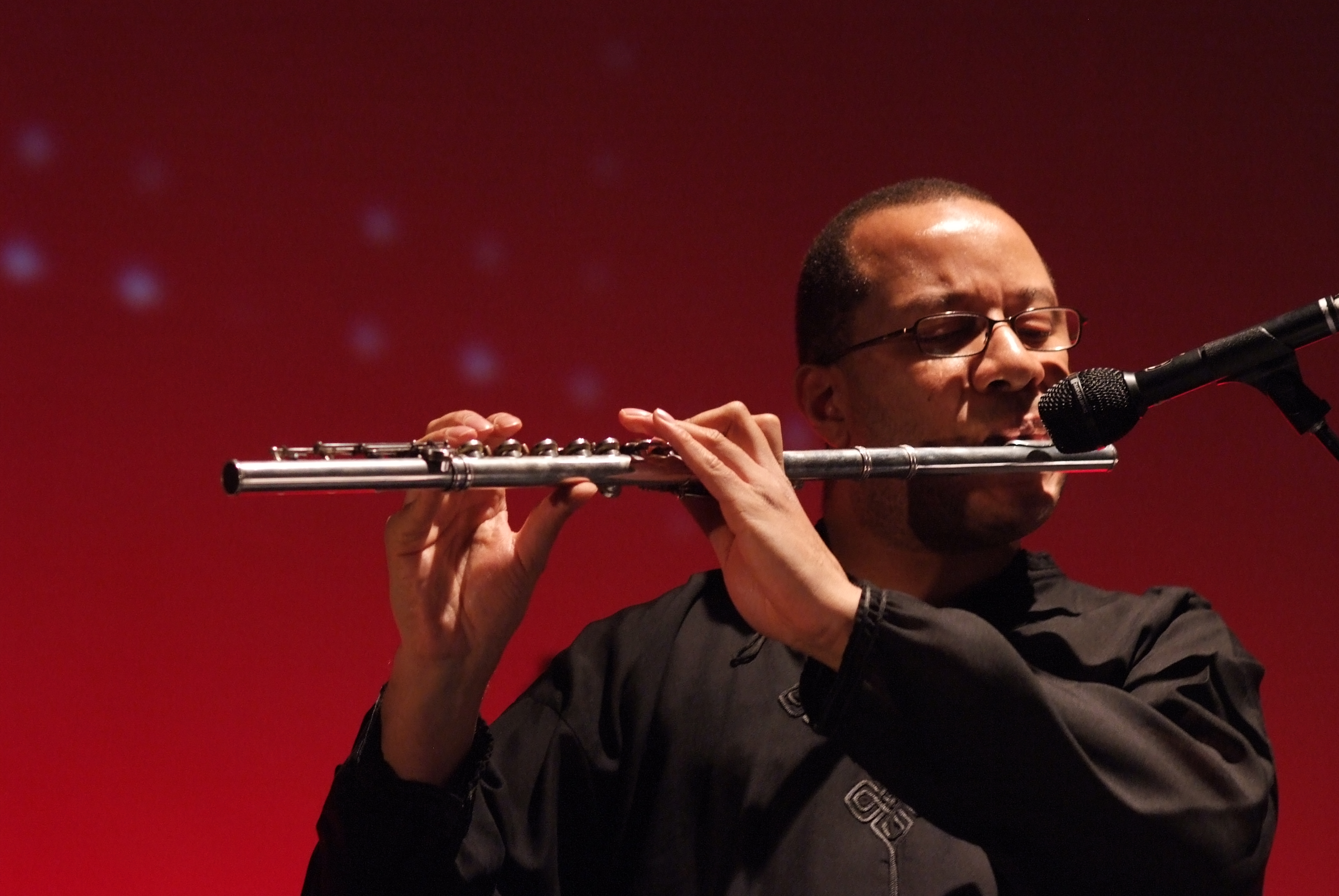
- Sutherland in 2007
- Education: Guildhall School of Music and Drama
- Occupation: Flautist

Rowland Sutherland is a British flautist, who studied flute at the Guildhall School of Music and Drama mainly with Kathryn Lukas. He also had lessons with Philippa Davies and Peter Lloyd and participated in master classes given by the late Geoffrey Gilbert. He studied jazz with the late pianist Lionel Grigson in the mid-1980s. Sutherland performs in new music ensembles, jazz groups, symphony orchestras, improvised music, various non-Western groups, pop outfits and as a soloist. Many of Sutherland's solo contemporary flute performances have been broadcast on BBC Radio 3. He has also composed and arranged music for various groups, ensembles and for the BBC.

Sutherland has taught at the Trinity College of Music, the Guildhall School of Music and Drama and the Royal Northern College of Music. He has worked at the Southampton, York and Durham Universities and the Centre for Young Musicians, Morley College, giving consultations and workshops. He is a visiting tutor at the Composition Department of the Royal Birmingham Conservatoire.

Sutherland fronts his own band, Mistura, who perform Brazilian jazz fusion alongside Afro-Cuban and pan-African grooves and have released the album Coast to Coast. Mistura have performed at a number of the leading jazz festivals in Britain, including at Glastonbury, Glasgow, and Greenwich. In 1998, Mistura supported pianist and singer Tania Maria at the Queen Elizabeth Hall in London.

Sutherland has played and recorded with many new music ensembles and dance companies in Britain. These include New Music Players, Ixion, Icebreaker, Lontano, London Musici, Uroboros, Music Projects/London, Phoenix Dance, Jazz Xchange Music and Dance and Rambert Dance Company. In 2003, the New Music Players' CD Crying Bird, Echoing Star featured Sutherland's composition "Timeless Odyssey".

In 2004, Rowland was one of the featured jazz soloists with the BBC Concert Orchestra and the Russell Maliphant dance company, performing works by Barry Adamson at the Barbican Centre.
