= Acantheucosma =

Scientific classification
- Domain: Eukaryota
- Kingdom: Animalia
- Phylum: Arthropoda
- Class: Insecta
- Order: Lepidoptera
- Family: Tortricidae
- Subfamily: Olethreutinae
- Tribe: Olethreutini
- Genus: Acantheucosma; Diakonoff, 1988
- Species: A. trachyptilla

Binomial name
- Acantheucosma trachyptilla Diakonoff, 1988

Monotypic genus of tortrix moths

Acantheucosma is a monotypic genus of tortrix moths in subfamily Olethreutinae and tribe Olethreutini. Its sole species, Acantheucosma trachyptilla, is known from Madagascar. Both taxa were described by Alexey Diakonoff in 1988.

== See also ==
- List of Tortricidae genera
