= Palaeomorpha =

Scientific classification
- Kingdom: Animalia
- Phylum: Arthropoda
- Class: Insecta
- Order: Lepidoptera
- Family: Tortricidae
- Tribe: Olethreutini
- Genus: Palaeomorpha; Diakonoff, 1973

Genus of tortrix moths

Palaeomorpha is a genus of moths belonging to the subfamily Olethreutinae of the family Tortricidae.

== Species ==
- Palaeomorpha jacobsoni Diakonoff, 1973

== See also ==
- List of Tortricidae genera
