= Capricornia =

Capricornia may refer to:

== Places ==
- Capricornia, Queensland, a region of the coast located around Rockhampton, Queensland
- Division of Capricornia, an electoral district in the Australian House of Representatives based around the region
- Capricornia, a proposed new Australian State based in northern Queensland

== Other uses ==
- Capricornia (album), a 2002 album by Midnight Oil
- Capricornia (moth), a genus of moths
- Capricornia (novel), a 1938 novel by Australian author Xavier Herbert, set in the Northern Territory
- "Capricornia", a song by the band Allo Darlin' from their album Europe
