= Macnas =

Irish performance company

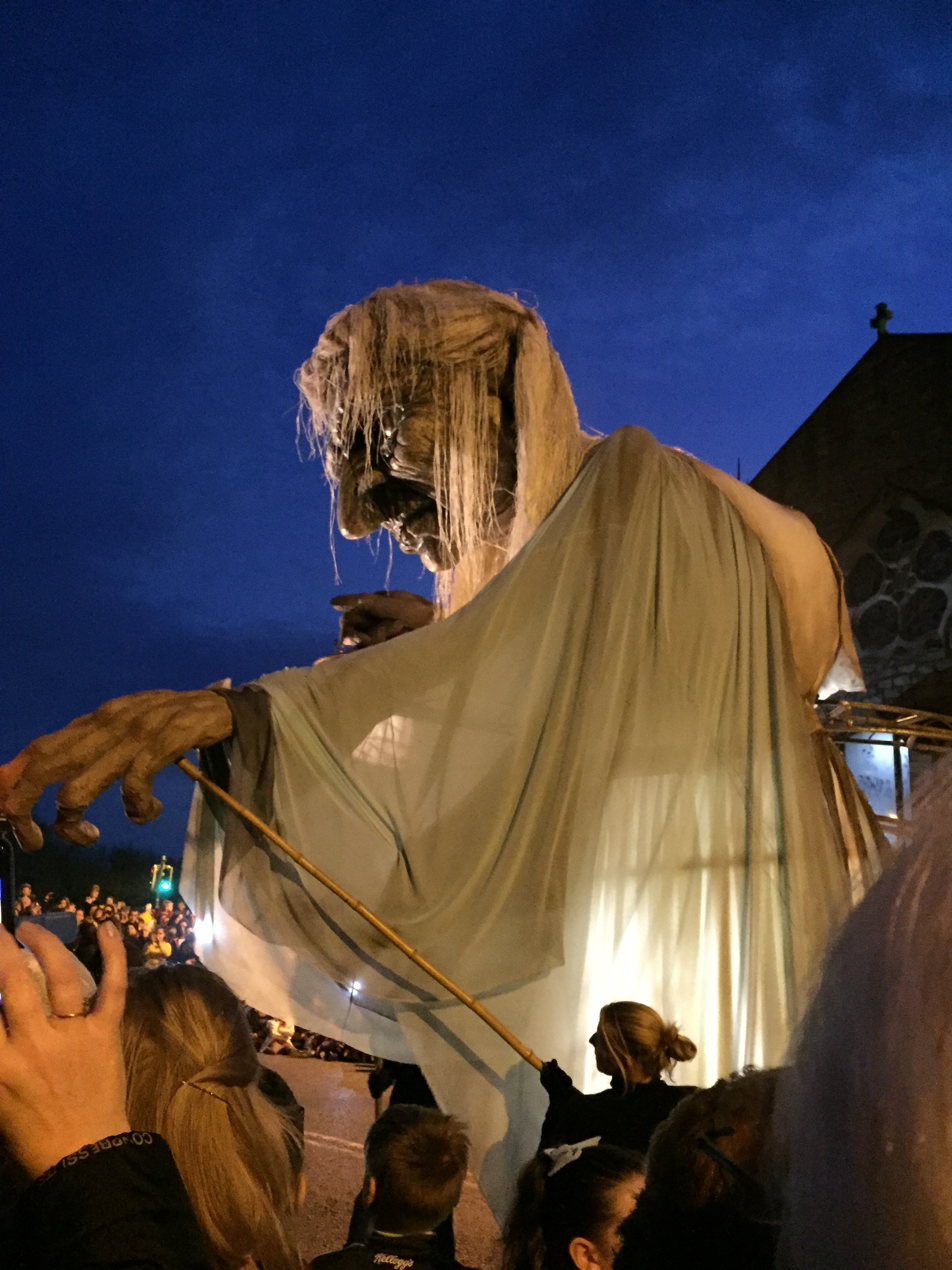
A Macnas structure in Galway City during the Savage Grace parade in October 2016

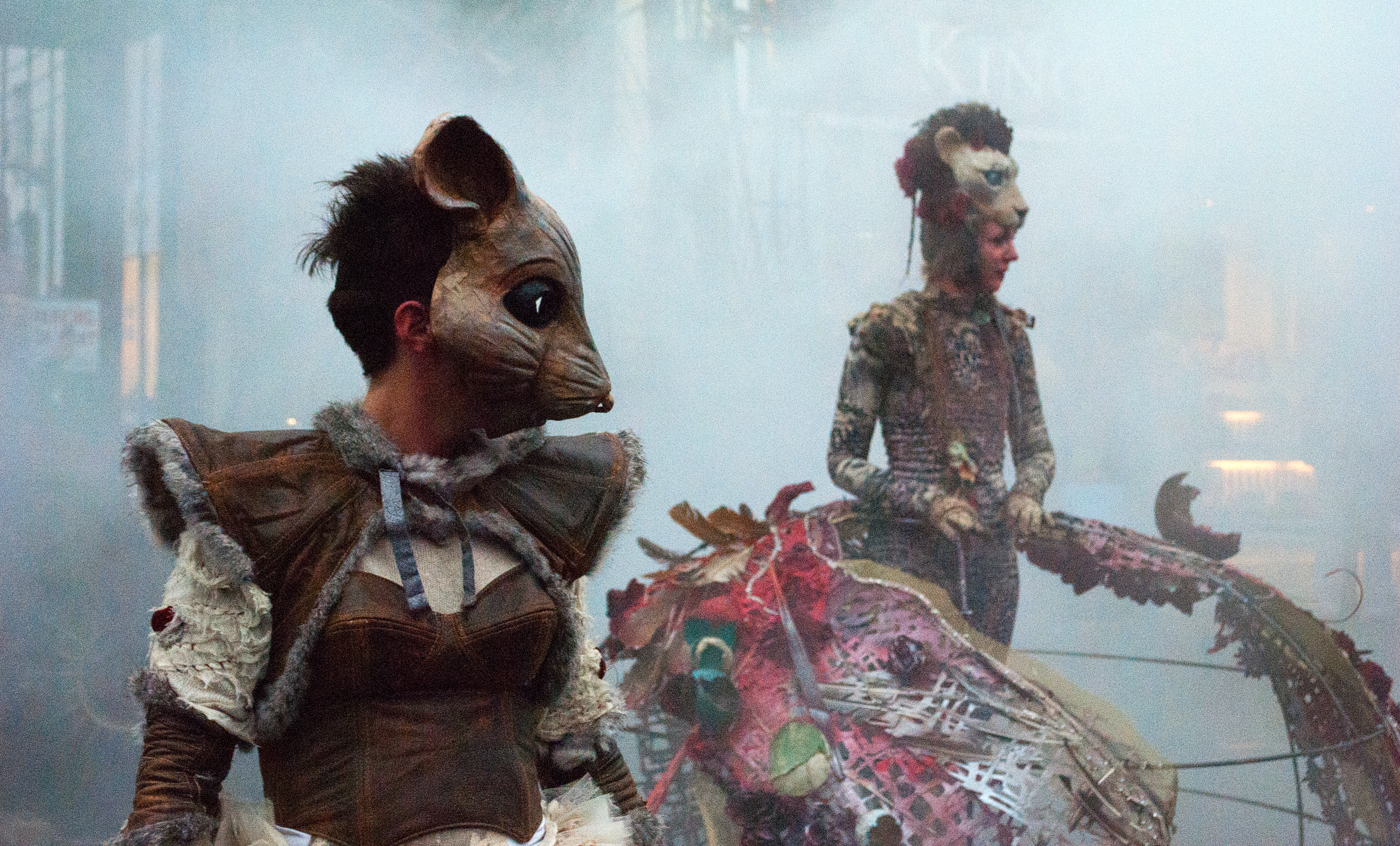
Performers in the Macnas street parade at the Kilkenny Arts Festival 2013

Macnas (pronounced mock-ness) is (Irish for 'frolicking') is a performance company based at the Fisheries Field in Galway, Ireland. Its public performances are noted for being "pioneering, inventive and radical" in style. The company has been credited with changing the nature of public entertainment in Ireland and is regarded as highly influential within the field of spectacle performance.

Founded in 1986, the company has performed in over 20 countries across the globe. Its parades have been a centre-point of Halloween, St. Patrick's Day and formerly Galway International Arts Festival festivities in Galway city, drawing crowds of up to 50,000 people on to the city streets.

Macnas toured alongside U2 as part of the Zoo TV Tour in 1993. The company simultaneously helped to ring in the new millennium in three cities: Galway (Eyre Square), Dublin (Merrion Square) and New York City (Times Square).

In March 2016, Macnas performed at the opening ceremony of SXSW in Austin, Texas. In November 2017, Macnas performed as the closing act in the Land of Green Ginger programme at Hull UK City of Culture 2017.

Macnas offices are spread across two locations in Galway city. Administration and rehearsals mainly take place in Fisheries Field. Large-scale construction primarily takes place at a warehouse in Liosban.

The Liffey Press and Macnas have published Macnas: Joyful Abandonment, a 250-page history of the company.
