= Bucephalacra =

Scientific classification
- Domain: Eukaryota
- Kingdom: Animalia
- Phylum: Arthropoda
- Class: Insecta
- Order: Lepidoptera
- Family: Tortricidae
- Tribe: Olethreutini
- Genus: Bucephalacra; Diakonoff, 1970

Genus of tortrix moths

Bucephalacra is a genus of moths belonging to the subfamily Olethreutinae of the family Tortricidae.

== Species ==
- Bucephalacra duplex (Diakonoff, 1981)
- Bucephalacra scoliosema Diakonoff, 1970

== See also ==
- List of Tortricidae genera
