= James Poke =

English musician (born 1963)

James Poke (born 1963 in Dorking, England) is a musician, primarily known as artistic director and co-founder of the ensemble Icebreaker.

Poke studied music at the University of York and composition with Erich Urbanner at the Hochschule für Musik und Darstellende Kunst in Vienna. With John Godfrey he founded Icebreaker in 1989. As well as running the group, he also plays flutes, pan-pipes, keyboards and WX11 wind synthesiser in the ensemble. He has arranged many pieces for Icebreaker and produced or co-produced several of Icebreaker's albums.

He also has a strong interest in politics and is currently co-chair of the Nicaragua Solidarity Campaign Action Group, chairs the West Surrey branch of the Palestinian Solidarity Campaign and has twice stood for election as a councillor for the Green Party in Mole Valley.

== Discography ==
Playing flutes, pan-pipes, wind synthesiser and keyboards:

- Icebreaker, Official Bootleg (ICC, 1991, live album, cassette only)
- Graham Fitkin, Hook, Mesh, Stub, Cud (Argo, 1993) (with Icebreaker)
- Short Cuts – Breaking the sound Barrier – An Argo Sampler (Argo, 1994) (with Icebreaker)
- Icebreaker, Terminal Velocity (Argo, 1994)
- Icebreaker, Trance (Argo, 1996)
- Century XXI UK A–M (New Tone, 1996) (with Icebreaker)
- Bang on a Can, Industry (Sony Classical, 1995)
- Icebreaker, Rogue's Gallery (New Tone, 1997)
- Icebreaker, Diderik Wagenaar (Composers' Voice / Donemus, 2001) (also co-producer)
- Icebreaker, Extraction (between the lines, 2001) (also producer)
- Bang on a Can, Louis Andriessen: Gigantic Dancing Human Machine (Cantaloupe, 2003)
- Icebreaker, Trance (Cantaloupe Music, 2004) (also producer)
- Icebreaker, Cranial Pavement (Cantaloupe Music, 2005) (also co-producer)
- Icebreaker, Terminal Velocity (Cantaloupe Music, 2005) (also producer)
- Icebreaker, Music with Changing Parts (Orange Mountain Music, 2007) (also producer)
