= Adjustable Wrench =

Musical composition by Michael Torke

- by Michael Torke
- Composed: 1987
- Performed: 23 November 1987: United Kingdom
- Scoring: Chamber ensemble

Adjustable Wrench, sometimes also The Adjustable Wrench, is a composition for mixed chamber ensemble by American composer Michael Torke. It was composed in 1987.

== Composition ==
The composition was composed in 1987 and had its first performance in November 24, 1987. It was commissioned by the Huddersfield Contemporary Music Festival, in the United Kingdom, where it was premiered. The work was premiered by Ensemble Lontano, conducted by Odaline de la Martinez. It was later published by Hendon Music and Boosey & Hawkes, as most of Torke's compositions, and was first recorded by Kent Nagano conducting the London Sinfonietta under Argo Records.

== Structure ==
The composition is in one movement and takes up to 11 minutes to perform. It is scored for oboe, 2 clarinets in B♭, bassoon, horn in F, two trumpets in B♭, trombone, marimba, piano, synthesizer, two violins, viola, violoncello, and double bass. According to Torke, the work can be performed with multiple string parts and is compatible with symphony orchestras. There is no definitive seating arrangement for this composition for ensemble. However, the composer advises to put the piano near the winds, the marimba near the brass, and the synthesizer near the strings. Thus, three sections have to be well-defined on the stage.

It begins with a staccato melodic line by an instrument in the woodwinds, which is later transformed into chords by the strings. Then, the brass take over with a melody which is later transformed into chords, only to introduce a new melody based on the same harmonic structure. In this case, the keyboard instruments (piano, marimba and synthesizer) do not introduce anything additional to the music, for they imitate the group they belong in the composition. Given the syncopated nature of the composition, these instruments reinforce the attacks.

The composition relies on a basic four-bar structure that goes on in time, which is typical of pop music. According to the composer, the work is clearly structured into four differentiating sections.

== Reception ==
The critics' response towards this composition has been overall positive. The Financial Times has praised the intricacy of its constructions, whereas The New York Times has acknowledged its "relentless and ritual feel of jazz's wavelike choruses".

== Recordings ==
As of 2023, only the version by Kent Nagano and the London Sinfonietta has been released worldwide. It was recorded between November 9 and 13, 1989, at the CBS studio in London.
