= Vanada =

Musical composition by Micheal Torke

Vanada is an early musical composition by Michael Torke. A chamber piece, Vanada was composed in 1984 while Torke was still a student. Published in 1986, the piece is scored for a musical ensemble of twelve musicians using a mix of acoustic and electric instruments.

== Information ==
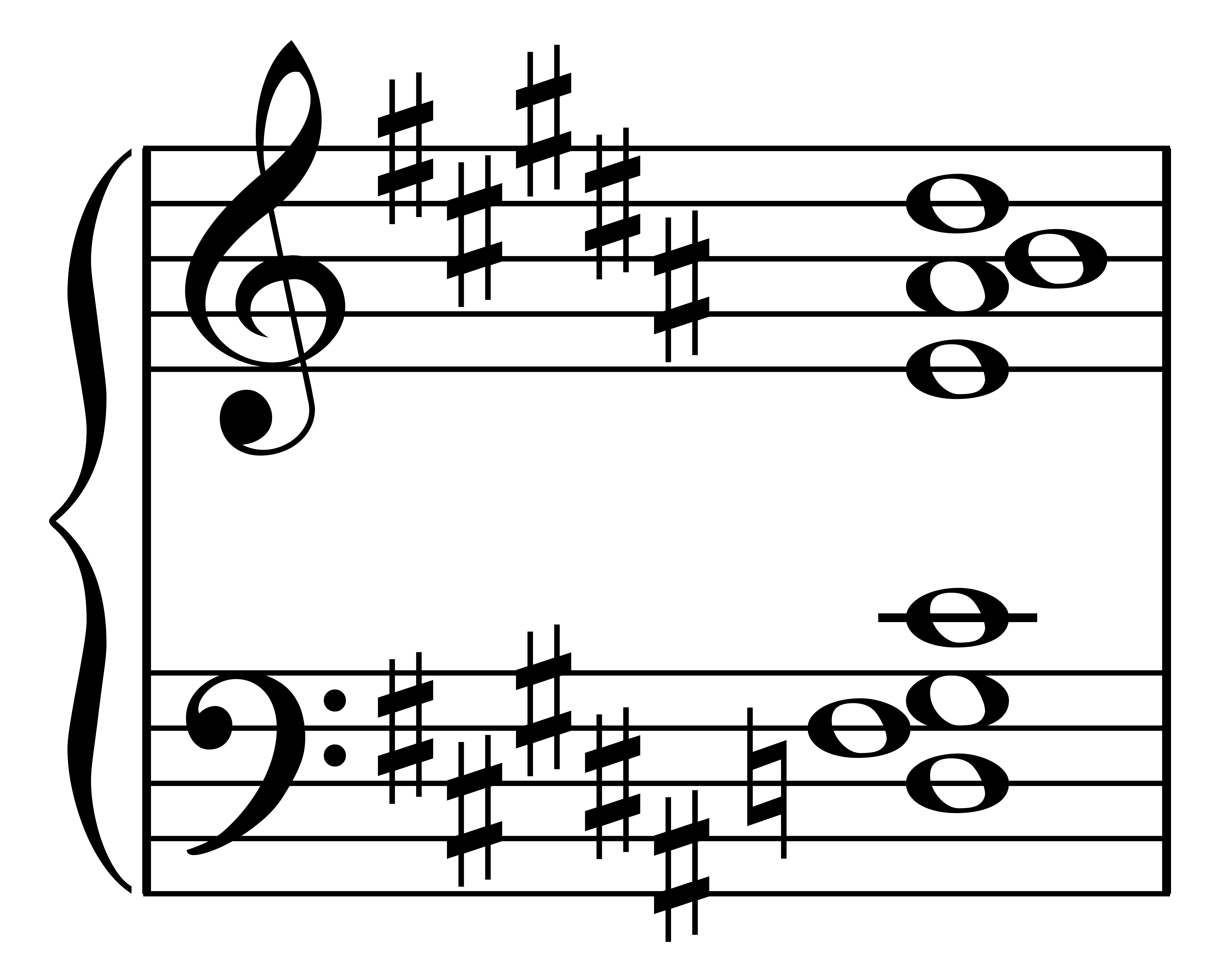
This chord serves as the basis of Vanada's harmony.

"In nearly all of Torke's music there's an implicit tension between a kind of free-form spontaneity and the tight structural control that he likes to impose on his material. An early work, the jazz-inspired Vanada (1984) bustles with a restless urban energy but, like fast-moving people in a modern city, each element knows precisely where it is heading. It's one of Torke's harshest scores, close in spirit to the aggressive European minimalism of Louis Andriessen"

— Staines, p. 588.

While written in the key of B Major/G♯ Minor, the piece is based around an eight-note chord with a non-key bass note of D natural. While the keyboards produce the chord all at once, the other instruments have it as a center for their phrasings.

Vanada begins with two bars in fortissimo, only to restart with a pianissimo and piano section punctuated with contrasting forte notes (bars 3 to 22). Later sections continue with dynamically contrasting material. The piece ends with the synthesizers rising in crescendo to a final blast at fffff or fortississississimo (bars 353 & 354). The piece has been described as "a romp for student chamber orchestra".

While the piece has received critical acclaim, Torke's ideas for the piece were opposed by the musical establishment at the time he composed it. The guest composer at the Eastman School of Music, where Torke was studying at the time, dismissed the material as "dangerously close to the corruption that's happening to all American music." The piece represents the freer approach of post-minimalism as compared to the austerity of serialism and minimalism. Vanada is Torke's first example of this approach, and the composer has consistently used it since.

Torke was influenced by Milton Babbitt's time-point system in his composition of Vanada, but added four extra notes to create a piece with a 4/4 time signature, rather than using 12/8 or 12/16 time which is normal for Babbitt's system. Torke was also influenced by pop musician Madonna's 1983 self-titled album, including the song "Physical Attraction". Vanada has been described as instantiating a "metallic sound world", similar in character to the work of the Dutch, minimalist composer Louis Andriessen.

A performance of the piece by the London Sinfonietta, conducted by Kent Nagano, was recorded in November, 1989 at CBS Studio 1 in London, and originally released by Argo Records (UK). This recording was re-released by Ecstatic Records in 2004.

== Instrumentation ==
- Horn in F
- Trumpet in C
- Trombone
- Xylophone
- Vibraphone and Glockenspiel, played by a single musician
- Marimba
- Piano
- Electric piano
- Two polyphonic synthesizers, one with glissando
- Electric bass
- Auxiliary percussion or electronic drums

== Bibliography ==
- Fiatow, Sheryl "A New Collaboration" in Playbill, Volume 7, Issues 1–12 (American Theatre Press, 1988).
- Oteri, Frank J., "Keys to the Music of Michael Torke" in the liner notes to Five of the Ecstatic Collection: Music by Michael Torke ER092299 (Ecstatic Records, 2004).
- Staines, Joe (ed.), The Rough Guide to Classical Music, 5th Edition (Rough Guides, 2010).
- Torke, Michael (composer), Vanada (Boosey and Hawkes/Hendon Music, 1986).
- Wierzbicki, James, "Torke: Adjustable Wrench; Rust; Slate; Vanada; the Yellow Pages" in Musical America 111(4) (Jul 1991).
