= Capricorn (ensemble) =

- Origin: London, United Kingdom
- Genres: Classical and contemporary
- Years active: 1973–2000

Capricorn was a mixed chamber ensemble based in London and active in the 1970s, 1980s and 1990s. Founded by the cellist Timothy Mason, clarinettist Anthony Lamb and pianist Julian Dawson-Lyell (who took the name Julian Jacobson in 1983), the original lineup was augmented by the violinist Monica Huggett to perform Messiaenʼs Quartet for the End of Time which featured in their London debut concert at Wigmore Hall in January 1974.

The core ensemble of four players was frequently augmented by other instrumentalists to enable them to perform an exceptionally broad repertoire from the Viennese classics to contemporary music and commissions. Many prominent singers and conductors appeared with the group for works requiring larger forces. Notable performances took place at Wigmore Hall, Purcell Room, St John's Smith Square, The Proms and the Queen Elizabeth Hall where in 1984 they gave a 10th anniversary concert, conducted by Lionel Friend, of music of the Second Viennese School.

The group appeared regularly on radio and television throughout Europe and at festivals including those of Aldeburgh, Bath, Brighton, Cheltenham, Edinburgh and Huddersfield. Capricorn commissioned works from composers such as Harrison Birtwistle, David Bedford, Diana Burrell, Edison Denisov, Zsolt Durkó, James Ellis, Erik Hojsgaard, Anders Nordentoft, Nigel Osborne, Bernard Rands, Niels Rosing-Schow, Poul Ruders.

Following the death in 1997 of Timothy Mason, who had acted as the group's unofficial artistic director, the group wound down its activities.

== List of players, singers and conductors ==
- Malcolm Allison (violin)
- Paul Archibald (trumpet)
- Keith Bartlett (percussion)
- Fenella Barton (violin)
- Sian Bell (cello)
- Stephen Bell (horn)
- Norbert Blume (viola)
- James Boyd (viola)
- Simon Bainbridge (conductor)
- Katie Clemmow (oboe)
- Philippa Davies (flute)
- Andrew Durban (double bass)
- Catherine Edwards (piano)
- Gavin Edwards (horn)
- Judith Evans (double bass)
- Julian Farrell (clarinet)
- Lionel Friend (conductor)
- Miles Golding (violin)
- Barry Guy (double bass)
- Lesley Hatfield (violin)
- Monica Huggett (violin)
- Julian Jacobson (piano)
- Helen Keen (flute)
- Iain King (violin)
- Oliver Knussen (conductor)
- Joely Koos (cello)
- Anthony Lamb (clarinet)
- Elizabeth Layton (violin)
- Richard Lester (cello)
- Tim Lyons (double bass)
- Timothy Mason (cello)
- Susie Mészáros (viola)
- Roger Montgomery (horn)
- Gareth Newman (bassoon)
- Christopher O’Neal (oboe)
- Jean Owen (bassoon)
- Elisabeth Perry (violin)
- Andrew Roberts (violin)
- Ileana Ruhemann (flute)
- Enno Senft (double bass)
- Paul Silverthorne (viola)
- Stephen Stirling (horn)
- Helen Tunstall (harp)
- Vicci Wardman (viola)
- Sarah Walker (mezzo-soprano)
- Felix Warnock (bassoon)
- Jonathan Williams (horn)
- Roger Williams (trombone)

== Recordings ==
- Glinka Grand Sextet and Rimsky-Korsakov Piano and Wind Quintet (1985)
- Schnittke: Chamber Music (1996)
- Parry & Stanford: Nonets (1987)
- Hummel Septets (1989)
- Psalmodies: Vox in Rama; Nightshade (1992)
- Rasmussen, Rosing-Schow, Nordentoft, Højsgaard: Chamber Music (1993)
- Agnus Dei Volumes 1 & 2 (1996)
- Nightshade (2014)
