= Crash Ensemble =

Irish music ensemble

Crash Ensemble is an Irish new music ensemble based in Dublin. The ensemble receives funding from the Arts Council (Ireland) and the Dublin City Council. It has residencies at the National Concert Hall (Dublin), Ireland and the Kilkenny Arts Festival.

== History ==
In 1997, composer Donnacha Dennehy, conductor and pianist Andrew Synnott, and clarinettist Michael Seaver founded the group. The group played its first concert in Dublin in 1997. Beginning in 2002, the ensemble has mounted its own contemporary music festivals in Dublin, in a similar manner to the Bang on a Can Festival in New York City, including adopting their 'marathon' format for their 2006 celebration of Reich and again in 2007 for their 10th year celebration 'Shindig'.

Alan Pierson served as the ensemble's first principal conductor, from 2006 to 2021. Ryan McAdams succeeded Pierson as principal conductor.

The ensemble has been particularly associated with totalist (post-minimalist) composers from the US and post-New Hague School composers from The Netherlands, in addition to performing music by Dennehy and other Irish composers and older pieces by the minimalist generation (including Steve Reich, Philip Glass, Louis Andriessen, Gavin Bryars, Roberto Carnevale, Kevin Volans and Terry Riley). It has given premieres or commissioned work by Nico Muhly, Valgeir Sigurðsson, Peter Adriaansz, Raymond Deane, Arnold Dreyblatt, Stephen Gardner, Michael Gordon, John Godfrey, Andrew Hamilton, Jurgen Simpson, Gerhard Stabler, Jennifer Walshe, Ian Wilson, Linda Buckley, Judith Ring and Julie Feeney.

The ensemble incorporates video, lighting and sound amplification as integral parts of its work. The ensemble has performed with many artists from diverse musical backgrounds, such as Iarla Ó Lionáird, Dawn Upshaw, Gavin Friday, Steve Reich, Terry Riley, Gavin Bryars, Risa Jaroslaw & Dancers, Julie Feeney, Laura Moody, Niwel Tsumbu, Con Tempo Quartet, Sam Amidon, and Ye Vagabonds. The ensemble has recorded commercially for such labels as NMC, Cantaloupe Music and Nonesuch Records. The ensemble has also released recordings on their own label, Crash Records.

== Members ==
As of 2026, the current roster of musicians in Crash Ensemble is as follows:

- Larissa O'Grady (violin)
- Lisa Dowdall (viola)
- Kate Ellis (cello)
- Malachy Robinson (double bass)
- Caimin Gilmore (double bass)
- Susan Doyle (flute)
- Leonie Bluett (clarinet)
- Brian Bolger (electric guitar)
- Barry O'Halpin (electric guitar, keyboards)
- Alex Petcu (percussion)
- Roddy O'Keeffe (trombone)
- Eliza McCarthy (piano, keyboards)
- Andrew Zolinsky (piano, keyboards)

As of 2026, the administrators and collaborative artists of Crash Ensemble are as follows:

- Siân Cunningham (chief executive officer/CEO)
- Kate Ellis (artistic director)
- Laura Bowler (artist-in-residence)
- Sam Redway (artist-in-residence)
- Jonathan Nangle (artistic advisor)
- Diamanda La Berge Dramm (artistic advisor)
- David Brophy (creative partner)
- Francesca de Buyl (production manager)
- Zach Douglas (ensemble manager)
- Adrian Hart (audio producer, production manager and electronics)
- Louise Barker (marketing lead)
- Laura Sheeran (filmmaker-in-residence)

== Principal conductors ==
- Alan Pierson (2006–2021)
- Ryan McAdams (2021–present)
