= Javelin (Torke) =

- by Michael Torke
- Key: A major
- Composed: 1994
- Performed: 4 September 1994: Woodruff Arts Center, Atlanta
- Scoring: Large orchestra

Javelin is a composition for orchestra by American composer Michael Torke. It was finished in 1994.

== Composition ==
Javelin was commissioned by the Atlanta Committee for the Olympics, which was about to celebrate the 50th anniversary of the Atlanta Symphony Orchestra. It was premiered in the Woodruff Arts Center in Atlanta, by the Atlanta Symphony Orchestra under Yoel Levi, on September 8, 1994. It was also performed in the opening ceremony of the 1996 Summer Olympics, which took place in Atlanta. It was later published by Boosey and Hawkes.

== Structure ==
The composition is in one movement and takes approximately 9 minutes to perform. The composition is in the key of A major. It is scored for a large orchestra. It has both the structure and the external appearance of an overture, even though it is not marked as such in the score. According to the composer, he had three things in mind when composing the piece:

- The orchestra had to be used as a virtuosic instrument
- The use of triads (three-note tonal chords) should be present along the score
- The music had to be thematic

Even though it consists of 591 measures, the playful, fast tempo resembles the swiftness of javelins. The strictly tonal character of this composition has led some critics to compare the style used by Torke with other classical composers, rather than modern and contemporary composers. According to Torke, this is his "most John Williams-like composition".

== Arrangements ==
Merlin Patterson wrote an arrangement of this piece in 1997 for wind ensemble. It was recorded by the University of Kansas Wind Ensemble under Paul W. Popiel in 2013. The arrangement was commissioned by the University of Houston School of Music and conductor Eddie Green.

== Recordings ==
This composition has been recorded several times by renowned conductors and orchestras:

- Yoel Levi first recorded the piece with the Atlanta Symphony Orchestra on November 14, 1995, in Atlanta's Symphony Hall. The recording was released by Argo Records.
- John Williams conducted the Boston Pops Orchestra in January 1996, in the Symphony Hall of Boston, Massachusetts. The recording was released by the NBC.
- Marin Alsop and the Royal Scottish National Orchestra released a recording in February 2002 under Naxos Records. The recording took place in the Henry Wood Hall in Glasgow.
- Paul W. Popiel and the University of Kansas Wind Quintet released a 1997 adaptation of the original work by Merlin Patterson. This adaptation was recorded again by Naxos in April 2012.
