= Gordon McPherson =

Scottish composer

Gordon McPherson (born 1965) is a Scottish composer.

McPherson was born in Dundee. He studied at the University of York, England, returning there for his doctorate, continuing with post-doctoral research at the Royal Northern College of Music.

McPherson has composed almost 100 pieces (as of 2006). His work has been performed and broadcast widely throughout the world. Recent works have included Kamperduin, a second work for the Royal Scottish National Orchestra, commissioned to commemorate the 200th anniversary of the 1797 Battle of Camperdown; Friends in Strange Places, a new chamber work recorded for the inauguration of Dundee Contemporary Arts; a second study for guitar, Miami, premiered at the Wigmore Hall in 1998 and Detours, commissioned by the Hebrides Ensemble.

The Baby Bear's Bed for Icebreaker was premiered in Vienna in October 1999 and has subsequently received performances in Belgium, the Netherlands, Slovakia and the United Kingdom. It has also been recorded by Icebreaker on their Extraction album.

Other recent works include South for the National Youth Orchestra of Scotland, a seventh movement for his Handguns, a suite for Psappha, a third string quartet for the Salisbury Festival and a third study for the Bath International Guitar Festival.

He has been in demand both as a teacher and lecturer and was head of composition at the Royal Conservatoire of Scotland.
