= Jonathan Williams (horn player) =

British horn player (born 1957)

- Born: Jonathan Emlyn Williams; 1957 (age 67–68); Hertfordshire, England
- Genres: Classical, chamber music, soundtracks
- Occupation: horn player

Jonathan Williams (born 1957) is a British horn player, who lives in both Knebworth, Hertfordshire, and Fossa, near L'Aquila in Italy.

Jonathan Williams was born in Hertfordshire, England, and studied from 1975 until 1979 at the Royal Northern College of Music in Manchester with Sydney Coulston. While still a student he joined the BBC Northern Dance Orchestra, then after leaving Manchester he joined Sadlers Wells Royal Ballet as principal horn. In 1981 he joined I Solisti Veneti. In 1982 he joined the Chamber Orchestra of Europe as principal horn, and in 1984 was invited by Nicholas Busch to join the London Philharmonic Orchestra as co-principal horn. He was a founder of The Gaudier Ensemble and has recorded most of the central chamber music repertoire which includes the horn. He was co-principal horn of the BBC Symphony Orchestra between 1994 and 1997.

In 1986 Williams recorded Mozart's four horn concertos accompanied by Alexander Schneider and the Chamber Orchestra of Europe. In 2000, he co-founded the Orchestra Citta Aperta with Carlo Crivelli to record the soundtrack for Ginostra directed by Manuel Pradal and until 2009 Orchestra Citta Aperta continued to record many soundtracks for Manuel Pradal, Mazzacurati, Ficarra e Piccone until the Abruzzo region suffered several devastating earthquakes. The home of the Orchestra Citta Aperta "Teatro La Fragolina" in Fossa and the village has remained closed since then.

From 2009 until 2015 Williams was artistic leader of the Min Ensemble of Norway, and in 2011 left the Chamber Orchestra of Europe and played frequently with the Australian Chamber Orchestra until 2015. Orchestra Citta Aperta now records in the Conservatorio in L'Aquila or in Rome. " Lost Vision " is a project planned for 2019 linking London with L'Aquila and Spain using LOLA distance technology with music by Carlo Crivelli. Since 2015 he has freelanced in London, recently with English National Opera, and has worked on soundtracks both in London and in Italy with Carlo Crivelli and Battista Lena.

He is the only conductor of the Hatfield Chamber Orchestra's annual concert at St Ethelreda's in Old Hatfield.

== Recordings ==
- Wolfgang A. Mozart - The Four Horn Concerti, ASV Digital COE805 (1986)

Chamber Orchestra of Europe - Beethoven Symphonies - Harnoncourt
