= Audrey Riley =

British musician

Audrey Riley is an English cellist and string arranger.

== Career ==
Riley trained at the Guildhall School of Music with Leonard Stehn. She was a cellist for Virginia Astley from 1983 to 1986 and a one-time auxiliary member of the Family Cat.

Riley has been a member of the post-minimalist band Icebreaker since 1989, and a frequent indie session artist.

During 2002/03, Riley embarked on her own project, entitled A Change of Light, a collaboration between musicians, composers and visual artist Philip Riley, with Andrew Zolinsky (piano), James Woodrow (guitar), Nick Allum (The Fatima Mansions, the Apartments, Cathal Coughlan) and Rob Allum (High Llamas, Turin Brakes) both on drums, to present music for cello in an expanded recital. New works have been written by composers Gavin Bryars, David Lang, Steve Hillier (Dubstar), Mark Brydon (Moloko), Emma Anderson (Lush), Cathal Coughlan, Piet Goddaer (Ozark Henry), David Gavurin, Harriet Wheeler (The Sundays) and Damian le Gassick. After many performances in art galleries and venues in the UK, the project was recorded in 2003/04 for a combined CD/DVD release, with a second series being subsequently developed.

She took part in the first performance of a new work, "Views", with music by Cage, performing with the experimental Japanese violinist Takahisa Kosugi and the composer Christian Wolff which toured throughout Europe in 2005–6.

In 2014, Riley joined London music college the Institute of Contemporary Music Performance as the tutor for arrangement classes.

== Work ==
As an arranger and improvising session cellist she has recorded for two decades with numerous groups including The Style Council (A Stones Throw Away), the Smiths (Stop Me), Nick Cave (on Tender Prey), Dubstar, The Cure, The Go-Betweens, The Sundays, Lush, the Smashing Pumpkins (for whom she conducted the Chicago Symphony Orchestra strings) and Dave Matthews (for whom she conducted the Seattle Symphony Orchestra in eight of her arrangements for the album Some Devil), as well as live and television appearances with many others. She has contributed her playing and arrangements to new albums by Foo Fighters (Echoes, Silence, Patience & Grace), Coldplay (A Rush of Blood to the Head and X&Y), Feeder (Yesterday Went Too Soon, Comfort in Sound and Pushing the Senses), Muse (Absolution, Black Holes & Revelations, The Resistance and Drones), Moloko (Statues) and Fightstar (Be Human).

She has worked extensively with dance companies including Siobhan Davies, Royal Scottish Ballet and Random Dance. Since 2001 she has toured with the Merce Cunningham Dance Company performing Gavin Bryars Bi-ped and the solo work for cello, One^{8} by John Cage, in Paris, Mullhouse, Berlin, Dublin, Reykjavik, Bergen, Hong Kong, Brazil and at The Barbican Centre, London.
