= Kilkenny Arts Festival =

Annual arts festival in Ireland

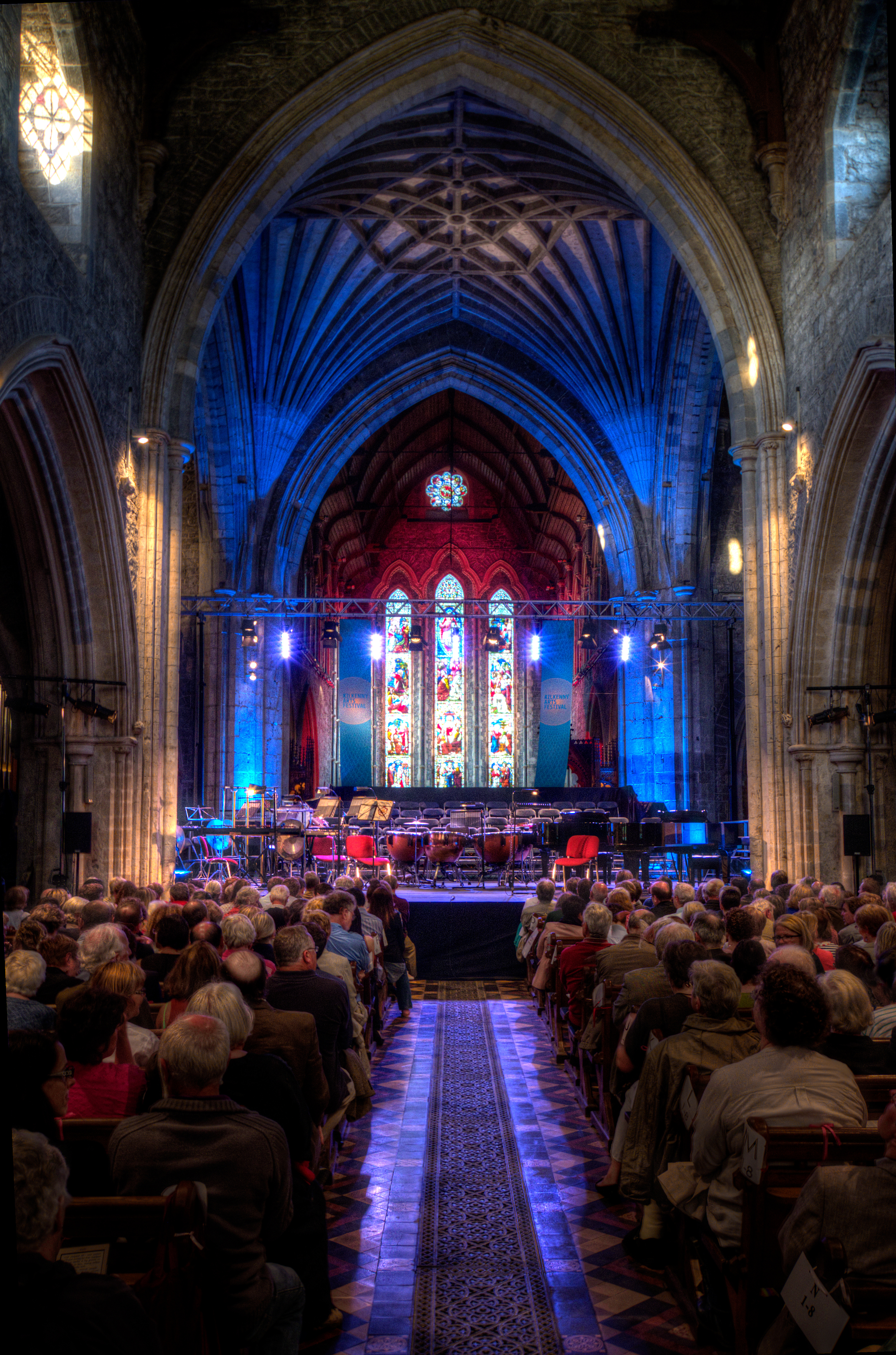
- St Canice's Cathedral ahead of a festival performance in 2013
- Status: Active
- Genre: Arts festival
- Date: August
- Frequency: Annual
- Location: Kilkenny
- Country: Ireland
- Years active: 1974–present
- Most recent: 2019
- Website: kilkennyarts.ie

The Kilkenny Arts Festival, formally known as Kilkenny Arts Week, was founded in Kilkenny, Ireland, in 1974. It covers a number of art forms, including classical music and performance. Playwright and poet Seamus Heaney gave a reading of some of his works during the inaugural event.

As of 2016, the event included theatre, dance, visual arts, and other forms of music and literature. The festival commissions works for the event locally and from abroad.

== Format ==
The ten-day festival takes place each August in Kilkenny and is intended to be a showcase for Irish and international arts.

Around 50,000 people have attended previous festivals, with performances taking place on the streets as well as in indoor venues. Former venues across the city have ranged from rooms in pubs, to St Canice's Cathedral and Kilkenny Castle.

== Performers ==
Performances have included US poet laureate Robert Pinsky, pianist Sir András Schiff, Malian virtuoso Toumani Diabaté, musician Alexander Lingas, historian Roy Foster, Irish portraitist Mick O'Dea, Iranian harpsichordist Mahan Esfahani, and Chinese-born pianist Zhu Xiao-Mei. Other performers have included Brooklyn Rider, Jordi Savall, Garrison Keillor, Susan Philipsz, Colm Tóibín, and Dawn Upshaw. Giant inflatable sculptures by Architects of Air have previously been a fixture. Other notable performers have included Shakespeare's Globe Theatre Company, Liz Roche's Company, Martin Hayes, and Junk Ensemble.

== Gallery ==
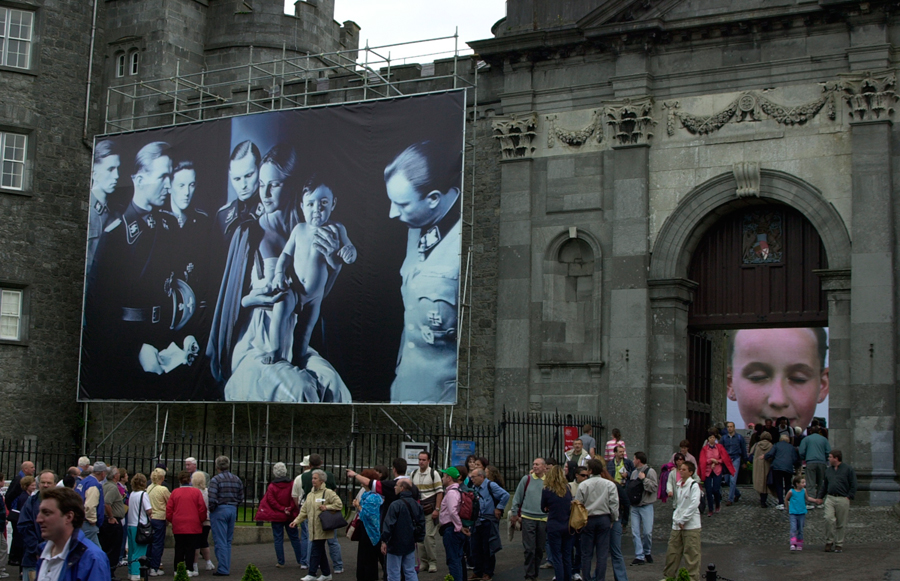
Gottfried Helnwein exhibit, 2001

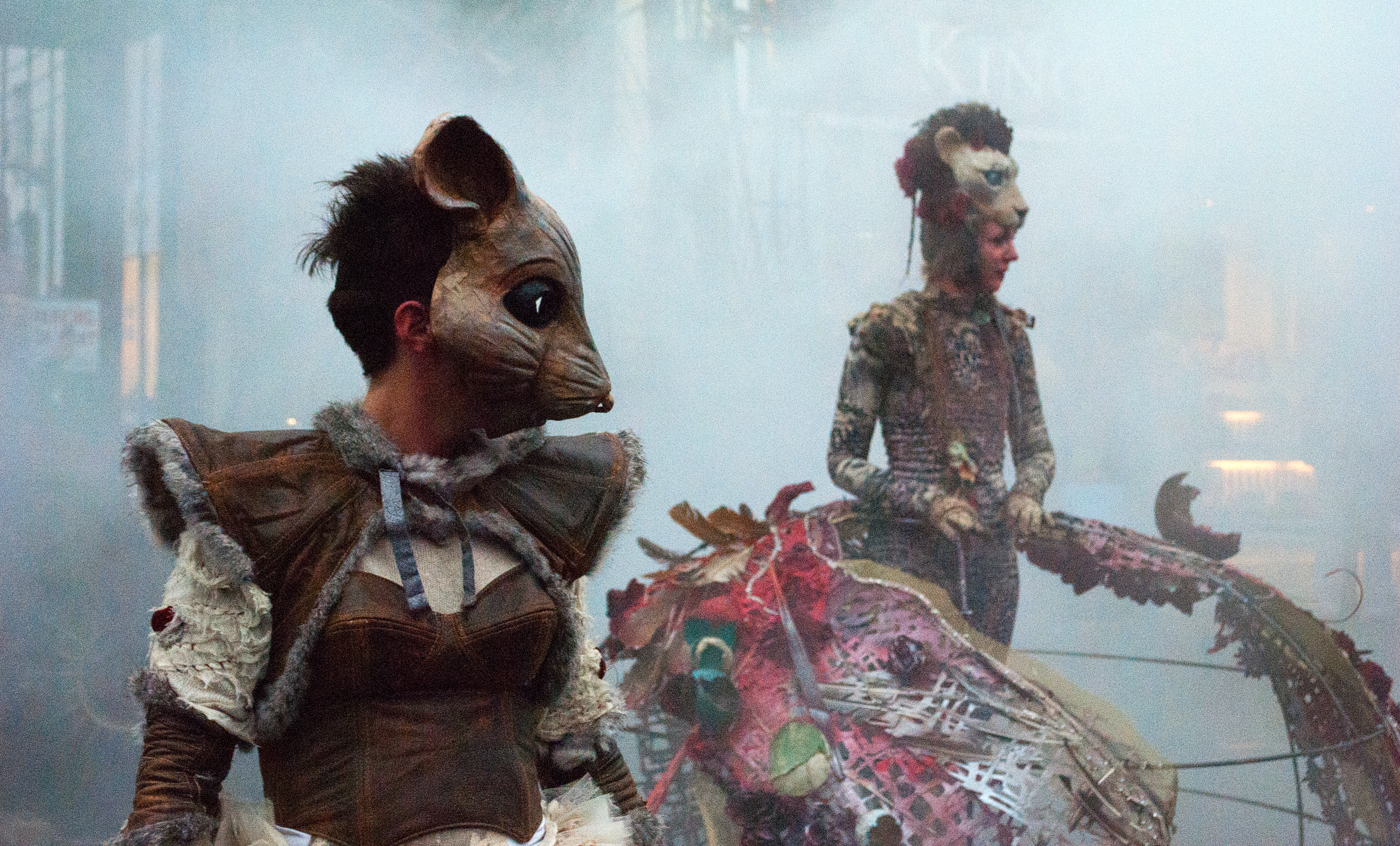
Macnas Street Parade, 2013

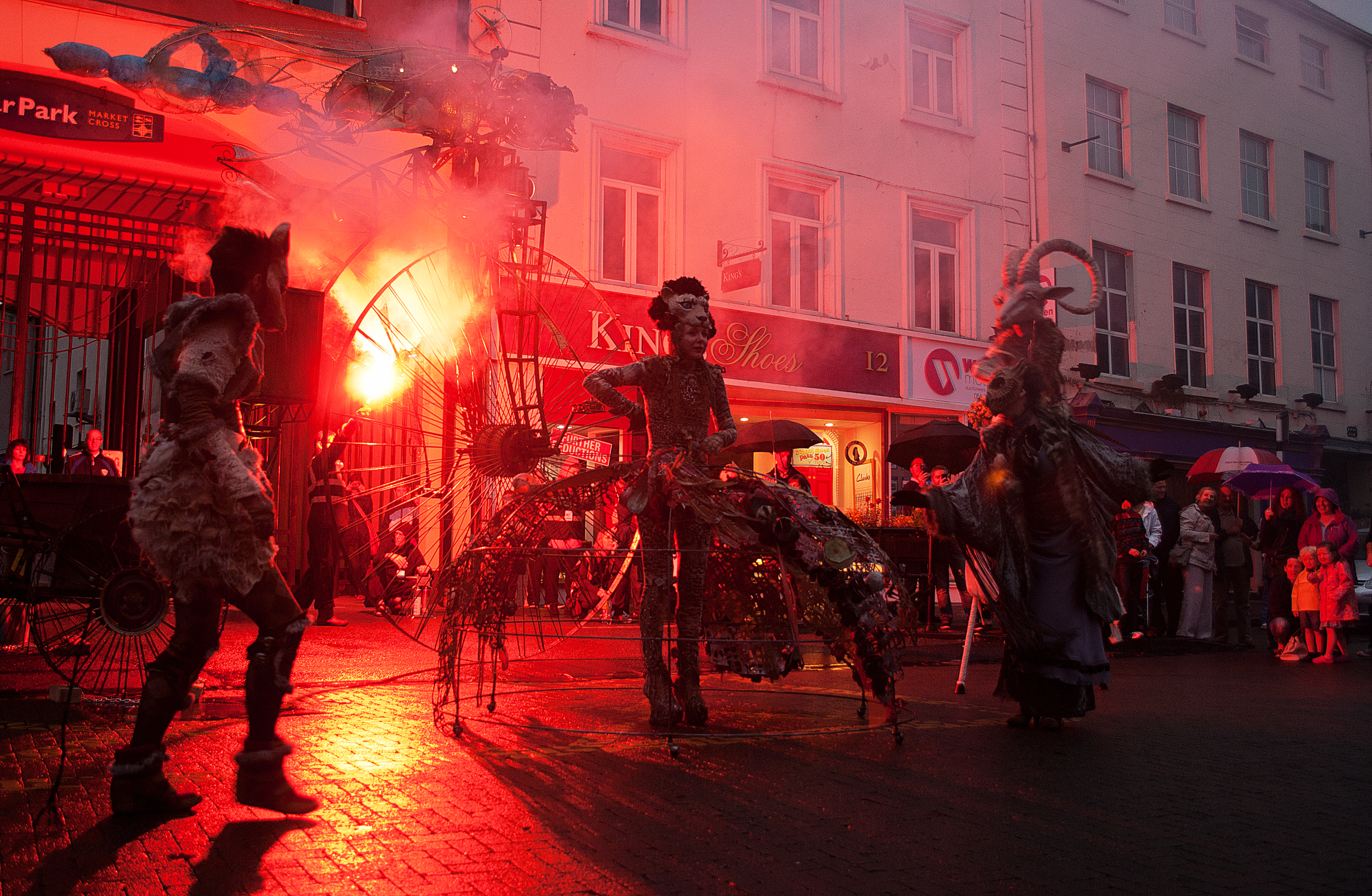
Macnas Street Parade, 2013

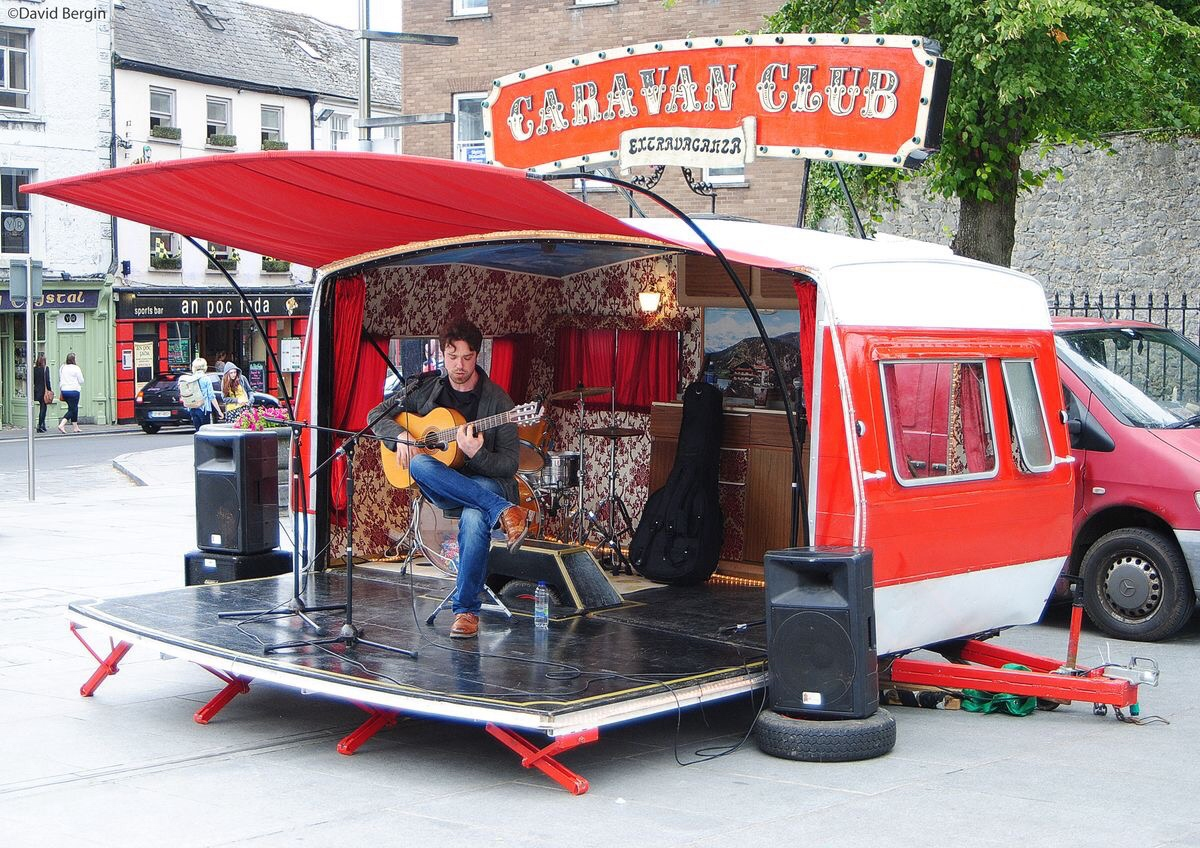
Caravan Club Sounds, 2015
