= John Godfrey (composer) =

John Godfrey is a composer and performer, co-founder and musical director of Icebreaker (1989-1997), founder member of Crash Ensemble (1997–present), founder of the Quiet Music Ensemble, and lecturer in music at National University of Ireland, Cork.

John Godfrey studied with Oliver Knussen at the Royal College of Music, Peter Maxwell Davies at the Dartington Summer School and with Richard Orton at the University of York, where he graduated with a BA Hons in music (1983) and an MPhil in composition (1989).

In 1989 he and another York graduate, James Poke, formed the new-music group Icebreaker, which went on to become one of the most successful ensembles in its field, appearing extensively in Europe and America. The group made several CDs for Decca Argo, New Tone and Donemus, which include John's works Euthanasia and Garden Instruments, S U S Y W I M P S and "Gallows Hill", as well as his arrangements of Diderik Wagenaar's Metrum and Steve Martland's Shoulder to Shoulder. John appears as a performer on all Icebreaker's CDs up to and including Rogue's Gallery.

In 1997, John was invited to join the Crash Ensemble. It quickly became Ireland's foremost and most adventurous new-music ensemble, and has performed not only frequently in Dublin but also throughout Ireland, Sweden, Germany, Holland, Canada, Australia and the USA.

John and UCC-graduate Sarah O'Halloran ran the 2008 Quiet Music Festival, at which the group the Quiet Music Ensemble was founded. The group performed new works by Alvin Lucier, Pauline Oliveros, David Toop, Mark Applebaum, Karen Power and Juraj Kos, all of whom were present. The Festival also included the first Deep Listening Retreat in Ireland. In 2009, the QME performed the closing night of that year's Dublin Electronic Arts Festival, with guest David Toop.

Recent compositions include Call of the Carolina Parakeet (2005), for Crash Ensemble, which received its premiere in Cork in spring 2005 and for David Adams (2005), for organ, as well as a number of soundscapes, including "Hermaphrodite" for the CruX Dance Company, and The Abstract Despotisms of Calculus for Crash Ensemble.

John's particular compositional influences include minimalists and post-minimalists, the most formative being, perhaps, Louis Andriessen and the Hague School. He has particular interests in work that exhibits Cage's idea that certain kinds of new music are about "perception, and the arousal of it in us". He is fascinated with the analytical concept of depth-coherence in music - and, intermittently, other forms of human endeavour - and with performance, most especially the performance of contemporary music.
