= Capricornia (moth) =

Scientific classification
- Kingdom: Animalia
- Phylum: Arthropoda
- Clade: Pancrustacea
- Class: Insecta
- Order: Lepidoptera
- Family: Tortricidae
- Subfamily: Olethreutinae
- Tribe: Olethreutini
- Genus: Capricornia; Obraztsov, 1960
- Species: C. boisduvaliana

Binomial name
- Capricornia boisduvaliana (Duponchel, 1836)

Synonyms
- Melodes Guenée, 1845

Genus of tortrix moths

Capricornia is a genus of leafroller moths in the moth family Tortricidae. This genus has a single species, Capricornia boisduvaliana, found in Europe and western Asia.The species was first described by Philogène Auguste Joseph Duponchel in 1836.

== See also ==
- List of Tortricidae genera
