= Steve Martland =

English composer

Steve Martland (10 October 1954 – 7 May 2013) was an English composer. He helped to curate the Factory Classical label of Factory Records, featuring contemporary British composers.

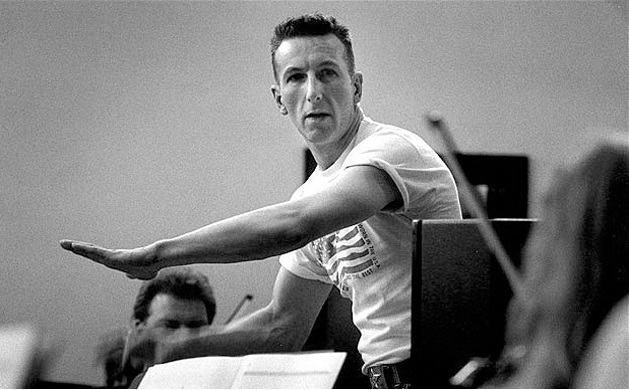

== Life and music ==
Martland was born in Liverpool, and studied composition at Liverpool University and in the Netherlands with Louis Andriessen. He worked almost exclusively with artists outside classical institutions—Dutch and American groups, freelance musicians and especially his own Steve Martland Band which toured his music internationally. He also worked with the King’s Singers and Evelyn Glennie for whom he wrote Street Songs. Martland was composer in residence at the ETNA Music Festival in Sicily in 2006 and 2007. His music was published by Schott Music.

Usually amplified, muscular and powerfully rhythmic, his music was extensively choreographed: Dance Works commissioned and premièred by London Contemporary Dance Theatre has received many new productions around the world, and Remix was awarded the SACD Prize for Video Dance Choreography Music after being choreographed for BBC TV by Aletta Collins.

His Principia was adopted as the theme music for the BBC radio programme The Music Machine. Dance Works is also used as the title music for a Dutch TV programme. He also wrote and directed A Temporary Arrangement with the Sea, a film about Louis Andriessen. In August 1998 he collaborated with the band Spiritualized on a project for the Flux Festival in Edinburgh.

Martland’s preoccupation with the function of the composer in society was reflected in his commitment to music education. He believed in the educational impact of creativity: "Creativity is everything that is against what's going on in the world right now. It's to do with tolerance and understanding other people." Martland directed many composition projects in schools both at home and abroad and he initiated and ran for many years Strike Out, his own annual composition course for school children.

Martland died in Reading after suffering a heart attack in his sleep, during the night of 6 May 2013, at the age of 58.

== Legacy ==
In 2015, composer Tim Benjamin founded the Steve Martland Scholarship for young composers at the Sound and Music Summer School, in honour of his former mentor.

== Works ==
- 1982 – Duo, trumpet and piano
- 1982 – Kgakala, for solo piano
- 1983 – Babi Yar, Large orchestra in 3 groups
- 1984 – lotta continua, for orchestra and jazz ensemble.
- 1984 – Orc for horn and small orchestra
- 1981 rev.1985 – American Invention, 13 players in 3 groups
- 1985 – Remix, ensemble
- 1985 – Remembering Lennon
- 1986 – Shoulder to Shoulder, wind ensemble
- 1986 – Dividing the Lines, for brass band
- 1986 – Big Mac I
- 1987 – Drill, for two pianos
- 1987 – Big Mac II, for 9 players
- 1988 – Glad Day (3 songs) for voice and 14 players
- 1989 – Birthday Hocket, two pianos
- 1989 – Principia, ensemble
- 1989 – Skywalk, for unaccompanied chorus (SSATB)
- 1990 – Crossing the Border, string ensemble
- 1991 – Wolfgang, arrangements of Mozart for wind octet
- 1991 – The Perfect Act, for voice and 8 players (text by Stevan Keane)
- 1992 – Patrol, string quartet
- 1992 – Toccata and Fugue, BWV 565, string quartet (J S Bach, arr Martland)
- 1992 – Full Fathom Five, brass quintet
- 1993 – Dance Works, two pianos (arrangement of work for ensemble)
- 1994 – Mr Anderson's Pavane, for 10 players
- 1994 – Horses of Instruction for 6 players. Written for Bang on a Can.
- 1995 – Beat the Retreat, 11 players
- 1995 – Horses of Instruction, for 11 players (Version of 1994 work for the Steve martland Band).
- 1996 – Kick, for 11 players
- 1996 – Thistle of Scotland for 10 players
- 1997 – Eternal Delight, for 11 players
- 1997 – Street Songs, marimba and vocal ensemble
- 1997 – Jenny Jones, unaccompanied chorus (SSAATTBB)- part of Street Songs
- 1997 – Summer Rounds, unaccompanied chorus (SSAATTBB)
- 1997 – Three Carols, for unaccompanied chorus
- 1997 – Shepard's Song, for unaccompanied chorus
- 1998 – Hard Times, soloists and string ensemble
- 1998 – Terminal for 5 players
- 1998 – Fantazia 6, saxophone quartet (Henry Purcell, arr Martland)
- 1998 – Fantazia 7, trombone quartet (Henry Purcell, arr Martland)
- 1998 – Mr. Anderson's Pavane, two pianos (arrangement of work for ensemble)
- 1999 – Step by Step, for wind octet
- 1999 – Fairest Isle, for counter-tenor and wind octet (arrangements or Purcell)
- 2003 – Plaint, for string ensemble
- 2005 – Tiger Dancing, for string ensemble
- 2007 – Eternity's Sunrise, for string ensemble
- 2007 – Reveille, for string ensemble
- 2007–08 – Starry Night for marimba and string quartet
- 2009 – Darwin, for choir, brass quintet and organ
- 2009 – Short Story, for saxophone quartet
- 2011 – Sea Songs, for mixed choir

== Discography ==
- 1989 – Babi Yar/Drill FACT 266 (Factory Classical)
- 1990 – Orkest de Volharding. Shoulder to Shoulder (Attacca)
- 1990 – Glad Day [featuring Sarah Jane Morris] FACT 306. (Factory)
- 1992 – Crossing the Border FACT 366 (Factory)
- 1992 – Wolfgang FACT 406 (Factory)
- 1994 – Patrol (Catalyst)
- 1995 – The Factory Masters (Catalyst – reissue of Babi Yar/Drill & Crossing the Border)
- 1998 – The King's Singers and Evelyn Glennie. The Street Songs (RCA Victor Red Seal)
- 2001 – Horses Of Instruction (Black Box)
- 2002 – Onyx Brass – Pavanes Fantasias Variations. Mr. Steve Martland after Mr. Henry Purcell: one note fantasy... (Meridian)
- 2007 – Wallace Collection – Hammered Brass. Full Fathom Five (Linn)
- 2009 – Britten Sinfonia 001 – Tiger Dancing {Songs of the Sky – Signum Classics}
- 2015 – Martland (NMC)

== Listenings ==
- Steve Martland audio on MySpace
- Dance Works in the Sound Library of the publisher Schott Music
- Remix in the Sound Library of the publisher Schott Music
