= Michael Torke =

American composer (born 1961)

Michael Torke (/ˈtɔːrki/; born September 22, 1961) is an American composer who writes music influenced by jazz and minimalism.

Torke was born in Milwaukee, where he attended Wilson Elementary School, graduated from Wauwatosa East High School, and studied at the Eastman School of Music with Joseph Schwantner and Christopher Rouse, and at Yale University.

== Works ==
Sometimes described as a post-minimalist, his most characteristically postminimal piece is Four Proverbs, in which the syllable for each pitch is fixed and variations in the melody produce streams of nonsense words. Other works in this style include Book of Proverbs and Song of Isaiah. An early piece where he first used a certain post-minimalist style was Vanada, made in 1984. His best-known work is probably Javelin, which he composed in 1994, commissioned by the Atlanta Committee for the Olympic Games in celebration of the Atlanta Symphony Orchestra's 50th anniversary season, in conjunction with the 1996 Summer Olympics. Commissioned by Disney and Michael Eisner for the New York Philharmonic's Millennium Celebration, he wrote Four Seasons, an oratorio for chorus and orchestra celebrating various aspects of the months. He wrote a ballet in 2002, The Contract, with choreography by James Kudelka. Torke was also commissioned to help Chicago celebrate the centennial of Daniel Burnham's 1909 Plan of Chicago and produced a work entitled Plans that was performed at the Grant Park Music Festival in June 2009.

A synesthete, he is the composer of numerous pieces that include colors in the titles (Bright Blue Music, Ecstatic Orange), later made into the suite Color Music (1991). Other pieces include the opera The Directions (1986), Rust (1989), influenced by rap and disco, Telephone Book (1985, 1995), Adjustable Wrench, and Ash (1989) and Mass (1990), which received criticism for an attempt at the style of Beethoven and Mendelssohn.

In 2003, he created his own record label, Ecstatic Records, on which he re-released a set of six 1990s CDs that were deleted by the now out-of-business Argo Records, which was a subsidiary of Decca Records.

His opera Pop'pea, a rock opera version of Monteverdi's L'incoronazione di Poppea, was commissioned by the Théâtre du Châtelet in Paris and premiered there on May 29, 2012.

== Awards ==
- Independent Music Awards 2012: Tahiti – Best Instrumental Album
- Finalist Pulitzer Prize 2020: Sky—Concerto for Violin
