= Erwin Reiter =

Austrian sculptor (1933–2015)

Erwin Reiter (25 September 1933, in Julbach – 19 December 2015, in Julbach) was an Austrian sculptor, best known for his metalwork sculptures installed in Linz and Kollerschlag. A graduate of the Academy of Fine Arts Vienna, he worked at the Kunstforum Salzkammergut and was a professor at the University of Art and Design Linz. He was the recipient of a Kulturpreis des Landes Oberösterreich and a Heinrich Gleißner Prize.
