= Art cycling in Millstatt =

Art cycling in Millstatt (German: "KUNSTradln in Millstatt") was an international annual art exhibition in Millstatt am See (Carinthia/Austria). It took the form of various art stations throughout Millstatt connected by a bicycle/ hiking route.

== Concept and organization ==
The exhibition debuted 2018, and was repeated 2019 and 2020, based on a long term funding by the European Union (= EU Rural Development Policy 2014-2020). It had stops at various locations in Millstatt and adjacent communities. These art stations formed a loop, which could be visited by art-interested visitors, either walking or cycling the trail (hence the name "Art cycling in Millstatt"). Works by (up to now) about 150 internationally known artists from Austria, Germany, United States, Switzerland, Hungary, Croatia, Romania, Poland, Italy, Greece, Spain, South Korea and Guatemala were connected in the yearly exhibitions.

For the first time, this exhibition concept also combined the various existing art and cultural institutions in Millstatt in a joint program. In addition, the concept opened up a number of new and sometimes unusual places in Millstatt as a presentation opportunity for modern art.

The access to modern art at art museums, art exhibitions and art galleries is often characterized by the fact that only an art-interested and art-oriented audience is able or wanting to participate. The project "Art cycling in Millstatt" provided a low-threshold mediating of art as follows:

1. by giving access over a long period (6 months);
2. by using Millstatt as a whole as art space for residents and guests alike;
3. by inviting a non-predefined art audience to participate, including randomly passing people (and cyclists too), who can and may come into contact with art in this way.

From 2021 onwards, "Art cycling in Millstatt" is replaced by a new concept called "millstART". Now the exhibition stations are concentrated in the Millstatt Abbey, and the concept of a low threshold access to art in a wider region was dropped.

== Stations and artists ==
There were 25 stations and 65 artists presented within the project 2018; 62 artists were presented 2019 at 25 stations, too, though some new stations were added and some former stations dropped. 2020 25 artists were presented at 18 locations, already mostly in the area of the former Millstatt Abbey. Altogether 151 artists were presented at 39 locations in Millstatt between 2018 and 2020.

Stations

- Several stations were located in the area of the former Millstatt abbey, using the Romanesque cloister and cloistered courtyard, the monastery museum, the Renaissance arcades, the former castle of the Grand Master of the Knights of Saint George with the former "Lindenhof Gallery", the catacombs of the abbey, or the monastery garden.
- More stations could be found in the centre of Millstatt (with the new central location of the event (since 2019), the "Kunstradln Gallery and Cafe"), and at the town hall, the congress centre Millstatt, as well as several old bourgeois houses and local premises as exhibition points.
- The locations included also several exhibition points at the lakeside of lake Millstatt, with sculptures exhibited alongside the lakefront park and promenade, and presenting art in hotels and restaurants at the lake.
- In 2019 there were also locations in the neighbouring community of Obermillstatt.

Artists and art workshops

The artists presented and the art-workshops offered were representing several areas of contemporary visual arts (names and events are noted here with the year of presentation at "Art cycling Millstatt"):

- Ceramic art: Maria Baumgartner (2018,2020), Veronika Dirnhofer (2018), Gabriele Hain (2018), Nina Höller (2019), Szilvia Ortlieb (2019), Daniel Wetzelberger (2019).
- Textile art: Gabriele Gruber-Gisler (2019), Lore Heuermann (2018), Frenzi Rigling (2018), Anneliese Schrenk (2018), Frederike Schweizer (2018).
- Fashion design: organized by „eyes & ah“ (Carolin Berger, Denise Hirtenfelder, 2019: exhibitions and workshops): “Work in progress” (2019, exhibition), Bettina Hornung (2019, workshop “costumes”; Michelle Haydn (2019, workshop “draping” ); Eva Schuller (2019, workshop “screen printing on textile”); Gerda Kohlmayr (2019, workshops “Hüte aus Woll-Filz/ hats from wool-felt”/ “Filzobjekte/ felt-objects”), and other workshops.
- Film, Video: Mariola Brillowska (2018), Jerzy Kucia (2018), Jochen Kuhn (2018), Manfred Neuwirth (2019), Hubert Sielecki (2018), Anna Vasof (2018).
- Graphic art: Peter Androsch (2019), Lena Göbel (2019), Wojtek Krzywobłocki (2018, 2019 workshop lithography), Thomas Laubenberger-Pletzer (2018, 2019), Ingrid Neuwirth (2018, 2019, 2019 also workshop etching), Michael Printschler (2018, 2019 workshop „lost mould“ ), Rudolf Sodek (2018, 2019), Hermann Staudinger (2020).
- Installation art: Jens August (2019), Brigitte Corell (2018), Regula Dettwiler (2018), Stefan Draschan (2018), Dietmar Franz (2019), Johannes Heuer (2018), Markus Hofer (2019), Tomas Hoke (2018), Nina Höller (2019), Gerhard Kaiser (2018), Brigitte Kowanz (2018), Walter Kupferschmidt (2020, Brigitte Lang (2018), Christoph Luckeneder (2020), Elke Maier (2018), Oswald Oberhuber (2018), Joe Palle (2019), Monika Peitler (2019), Michael Pöllinger (2019), Josef Ramaseder (2019), Adele Razkövi (2018), Sylvia Seimann (2019), Petra Sousan (2019), Katharina Steiner (2018, 2019), Editha Taferner (2019), Maria Temnitschka (2018), Andreas Werner (2018)
- Jewellery design: Anna Heindl (2018).
- Painting: Helmut Arnez (2018), Bettina Beranek (2020), Therese Eisenmann (2019), Cäcilia Falk (2018), Josef Floch (2018), Dietmar Franz (2019), Harald Gfader (2019), Franziska Güttler (2019), Alois Hain (2019), Bertram Hasenauer (2019), Manfred Hebenstreit (2019), Ursula Heindl (2019), Daniel Hosenberg (2019), Eva Hradil (2019), Mariana Ionita (2019), Peter Jaruszewski (2019), Richard Jurtitsch (2020), Franz Kaindl (2018), Karl Korab (2019), Edith Kramer (2018), Danja Kulterer (2019), Lisa Kunit (2018), Maria Lassnig (2018), Christine Lingg (2019), Silvia Lüftenegger (2020), Michael Maier (2020), Hannes Mlenek (2019), Martina Montecuccoli (2019), Alois Mosbacher (2018), Peter Neuwirth (2019), Ingrid Niedermayr (2018, 2019), Bettina Patermo (2018), Katja Praschak (2018), Gabriele Schöne (2018), Kurt Schönthaler (2019), Albin Schutting (2019), Wilhelm Seibetseder (2018, 2019, 2020), Stefanie Seiler (2020), Christina Starzer (2019), Helmut Swoboda (2018), Maria Temnitschka (2018), Larissa Tomassetti (2019), Rudolf Vogl (VOKA) (2018, 2019), Johann Weyringer (2018), Heidrun Widmoser (2020).
- Performance, Dance: Regina José Galindo (2018), Jakob Lena Knebl (2018), Andrea Schlehwein (2018), Billi Thanner (2020).
- Photography: Christian Brandstätter (2019, workshop photography), Thomas Defner (2020), Barbara Essl (2020), Johannes Leitner (2018), Detlev Löffler (2020), Sang Hoon Ok (2018), Willi Pleschberger (2019), Max Seibald (2018), Marilies Seyler (2019), Fritz Simak (2019), Mathias Swoboda (2018).
- Sculpture: Amy Brier (2018), Nemanja Cvijanović (2018), Peter Dörflinger (2019), René Fadinger (2019), Lukas Fuetsch (2019), Michael Fuetsch (2019), Herbert Golser (2018), Thomas Györi (2019, 2020), Clemens Heinl (2018), Robert Kabas (2018), Karl Karner (2019), Manfred Kielnhofer (2019, 2020), Andres Klimbacher (2019), Michael Krainer (2020), Alois Lindenbauer (2018), Gert Linke (2019), Helmut Machhammer (2018), Peter Niedertscheider (2019), Werner Pirker (2020), Georg Planer (2018), Gotthard Schatz (2019), Simon Schober (2020), Sylvia Seimann (2019), Kurt Spitaler (2019), Egon Straszer (2018, 2019, 2020), Johanna Tschabitscher (2019), Judith Wagner (2019, 2020), Manfred Wakolbinger (2018), Niclas A. Walkensteiner (2018), Daniel Wetzelberger (2019), Markus Wilfling (2018).

== External links and sources ==
Media related to KUNSTradln in Millstatt at Wikimedia Commons

- Homepage of the project (in German), last accessed October 3, 2019.
- Informations by the culture department of the Austrian federal state of Carinthia, accessed July 1, 2018.
- Newspaper article in the Austrian statewide journal "Kleine Zeitung" (in German), accessed July 1, 2018.
- Newspaper article in the Austrian regional journal "Bezirksrundschau" (in German), accessed July 1, 2018.
- Nora Leitgeb: Installation kopf.über: Katharina Steiner, in: Die Brücke. Kärntens Kulturzeitschrift, Klagenfurt, Nr. 7 Juni-Juli 2018, p. 30-31 (article in the Austrian arts and culture magazine "Die Brücke" on the project of the artist Katharina Steiner as part of "Art cycling in Millstatt")
- TV report "Art cycling in Millstatt", broadcast by the ORF (Austrian TV), June 5, 2018, accessed June 6, 2018.
- youtube-channel „KUNSTradln in Millstatt“, several videos, accessed Oktober 5, 2019.
- online report by the ORF (Austrian Broadcasting Company), March 21, 2019, accessed Oktober 5, 2019.
- video by the ORF (Austrian Broadcasting Company), studio Carinthia, on Art cycling Millstatt, July 20, 2019, accessed Oktober 5, 2019.
- video by Séverin Krön, youtube-channel „Kunst und Kultur in Kärnten“, June 20, 2019, accessed Oktober 5, 2019.
- Millstatt Inclusive Card, page 17: short infos on "Art cycling in Millstatt" in English, accessed June 1, 2018.
