= Fridolin Dallinger =

Austrian composer (1933–2020)

Fridolin Dallinger (16 February 1933 – 28 October 2020) was an Austrian composer, music educator and painter. He was the brother of composer Gerhard Dallinger (1940–2016).

== Life ==
Born in Eferding, Dallinger came from a musical home and was introduced to house music at an early age. He studied from 1946 at the Anton Bruckner Private University music theory with Helmut Eder and from the year 1953 composition at the Musikschule der Stadt Linz with Robert Schollum. In between, from 1948 to 1953, he graduated from the Lehrerbildungsanstalt Linz. From 1958 to 1961 he was in the teaching profession and taught as an Volksschule teacher in Eferding and St. Leonhard bei Freistadt, as well as at the music schools in Eferding and Waizenkirchen.

While working as a music teacher at the Bundesrealgymnasium Schloss Traunsee, he studied music at the Mozarteum University Salzburg and graduated with the Staatsexamen for piano and the Lehramt examination for field of study.

From 1975 to 1993, Dallinger taught as a music professor at the Private Pädagogische Hochschule der Diözese Linz the subjects form theory, musical composition, organology, didactics and piano.

From 1993, he was a freelance composer and painter. He had been a member of the Eferdinger Künstlergilde since 1955 and was also among the members of the Künstlervereinigung MAERZ. His works as a painter included abstract paintings and landscape painting. Role models for his compositional work were Johann Nepomuk David and Helmut Eder.

Dallinger died in Eferding at the age of 87.

== Awards ==
- 1954: Composition Prize (Art Promotion Prize) of the City of Linz.
- 1965: Austrian State Prize for music.
- 1967: Theodor Körner Prize
- 1977: Ehrenring der Stadt Eferding
- 1981: Kulturpreis des Landes Oberösterreich
- 1997: Heinrich Gleißner Prize
- 2003: Anton Bruckner Prize
- 2008: Kulturmedaille des Landes Oberösterreich
- 2013: Ehrenbürger der Stadt Eferding

== Works ==
=== Ensemble music ===
- Spielmusik - for string trio (1950).
- Little Suite - for clarinet, viola and cello (1961).
- Three Songs - for soprano, clarinet, viola and cello to texts by Wilhelm Busch, Josef Weinheber and Hermann Hesse. (1961)
- Zoologia buffa - for narrator, woodwinds, brass and percussion on texts by Wilhelm Busch (1964).
- Sonata - for viola and piano (1965).
- Bauernlieder - cycle based on texts by Georg Trakl for soprano, flute, viola and cello (1966).
- Des Krieges Ruhm - cantata for mixed choir, reciter, two pianos and percussion on texts by George Forestier, Peter Huchel and Wilhelm Lehmann (1969).
- Quintet - for flute, oboe, clarinet, horn and bassoon (1970).
- Kleine Spielmusik - for string quartet (1971).
- Five Pieces - for clarinet and percussion (1972).
- Quartettino - for flute (piccolo), oboe (English horn), cello and harpsichord (1973).
- Sonatine - for flute and guitar (1973).
- Sonatine - for baritone and harpsichord (1974)
- Concertino - for Violine, Klarinette und Streichorchester (1974)Doblinger 07316
- Elegy - for violin and piano (1984).
- Trio - for mandolin, guitar and harp (1985)
- Five Aphorisms - trio for flute, guitar and viola after verses by Gertrud Fussenegger (1992).
- Sechs Volkslieder im Satz - for 2 violins (1994).
- Tief im Schlummer seufzt die bange Seele - for oboe and organ (1999)
- 4 Stations in the Life of Gertrud Fussengegger - string trio for violin, viola and cello (2002).
- Metamorphoses on a Theme by Max Reger - for cello and piano (2003).

=== Vocal music ===
- Organon - melodrama for two-part female choir, male choir, narrator and instruments after a text by Kurt Klinger. (1953)
- Death - for mixed choir to a text by Matthias Claudius (1955)
- Three cheerful choruses after poems by Eugen Roth - for mixed choir (1956)
- Human Landscapes - cycle after Josef Weinheber for mixed choir (1964)
- Ich wandle finster, ohne Trost - for upper choir (1967)
- Ade, ihr Felsenhallen - for mixed choir (1975)
- Himmlischer Vater - for mixed choir to a text by Hans Sachs (1976)
- Five Choruses after Wilhelm Busch - for mixed choir (1976)
- Hunnenzug - for mixed choir (1977)
- Offside - for male choir (1980)
- Four Animal Songs - for mixed choir after poems by Josef Guggenmos and Christian Morgenstern (1983)
- Two Pedagogical Choruses - for mixed choir after texts by Christine Busta and Bertolt Brecht (1987)
- Was der Wald sah - for mixed choir to a text by Erich Fried (1988)
- Trust in the Light - for mixed choir to texts by Rudolf Alexander Schröder (1990)
- The Danube - secular oratorio for soprano, baritone, choir, organ and orchestra. Text: Gertrud Fussenegger (1992-1993)
- Lullaby in Winter - for male choir (1997)
- Herrgott, du bist Anfang und End - dialect mass for mixed choir after texts by Hans Dieter Mairinger (2002).
- Unsa bugladö Welt – Heimatlied aus dem Mühlviertel, text Albrecht Dunzendorfer.

=== Solo music ===
- 20 kleine Stücke – for piano (1980).
- Präludium und Toccata – for organ (1981).
- Metamorphosen – for piano (1988).
- Sonatine – for guitar solo (1990).
- Melos – for flute solo (1996).

=== Stage music ===
- Die sieben Todsünden (Gesellschaft für einen Abend) – Ballett für großes Orchester (1965/1970) Uraufführung: 30. März 1968 am Landestheater Linz
- Die Goldenen Zwanziger – The Roaring Twenties. Musical, text Adolf Opel (1988)
- Passion – Stage music for the Gospel play after Friedrich Zauner (2003)
- Johannes-Rufer in der Wüste – Stage music for the Gospel play after Friedrich Ch. Zauner (2005)
- St. Georgener Totentanz – Bühnenmusik für Chor, Kammerorchester/Ensemble und Solostimme(n) after texts by Hans Dieter Mairinger (2005)
- Zeichen und Wunder – Bühnenmusik zum Evangelienspiel Friedrich Ch. Zauner (2005).
- Das Grab ist leer – Bühnenmusik zum Evangelienspiel nach Friedrich Ch. Zauner (2006).
