= Fritz Riedl =

Austrian tapestry artist (1923–2012)

Friedrich Riedl (10 June 1923, in Vienna – 2012, in Linz) was an Austrian tapestry artist, best remembered for his tapestries commissioned for the headquarters of the World Health Organization, and the Council of Europe. A graduate of the Academy of Fine Arts Vienna, his tapestries have been exhibited in the collections of the Cincinnati Art Museum, the Museum of Applied Arts, Vienna, the Lentos Art Museum, and the Österreichische Galerie Belvedere. He was also a professor at the University of Guadalajara, and the University of Art and Design Linz, and was the recipient of a Kulturpreis des Landes Oberösterreich, an Austrian Decoration for Science and Art, and a Heinrich Gleißner Prize.
