= Peter Kubovsky =

Austrian draughtsman and painter (1930–2014)

Peter Kubovsky (4 December 1930, in Lundenburg – 20 January 2014, in Linz) was an Austrian draughtsman and painter, best known for his paintings and graphic art depicting nature and city landscapes. A graduate of the University of Art and Design Linz, he has exhibited at the Stedelijk Museum Amsterdam, the Vienna Künstlerhaus, and the Lentos Art Museum. He was the recipient of a Kulturpreis des Landes Oberösterreich and a Heinrich Gleißner Prize.
