= Markus Hofer =

Markus Hofer may refer to:

- Markus Hofer (sculptor)
- Markus Hofer (politician)
