= Rudolf Kolbitsch =

Austrian painter (1922–2003)

Rudolf Kolbitsch (21 May 1922, in Wels – 7 February 2003) was an Austrian painter and graphic artist, best remembered for his stained glass paintings, etchings, and steel engravings in various churches across Austria and Poland. Training under Emil Pirchan at the Academy of Fine Arts Vienna and later at the University of Art and Design Linz, he was a member of the Vienna Secession art movement. He was the recipient of a Heinrich Gleißner Prize.
