= Roland Ertl =

Austrian architect (1934–2015)

Roland Ertl (6 November 1934, in Linz – 7 June 2015) was an Austrian architect, best known for his work on the Brucknerhaus and the Linz Airport. A graduate of the Vienna University of Technology, he was a professor of architecture at the University of Art and Design Linz. He was the recipient of a Kulturpreis des Landes Oberösterreich and a Heinrich Gleißner Prize.
