= Marga Persson =

Swedish-Austrian artist (born 1943)

Marga Persson (born 27 February 1943, in Lund) is a Swedish-Austrian artist, best known for her textile arts and visual arts which have been exhibited at the Johannes Kepler University Linz, the Vienna General Hospital, Wilhering Abbey, the Museum of Applied Arts, Vienna, the Lentos Art Museum, and the Vienna Künstlerhaus. She has also held taught art at the University of Applied Arts Vienna and the University of Art and Design Linz. She has received a Kulturpreis des Landes Oberösterreich and a Heinrich Gleißner Prize.
