= Maximilian Rudolf Luger =

Austrian architect (born 1958)

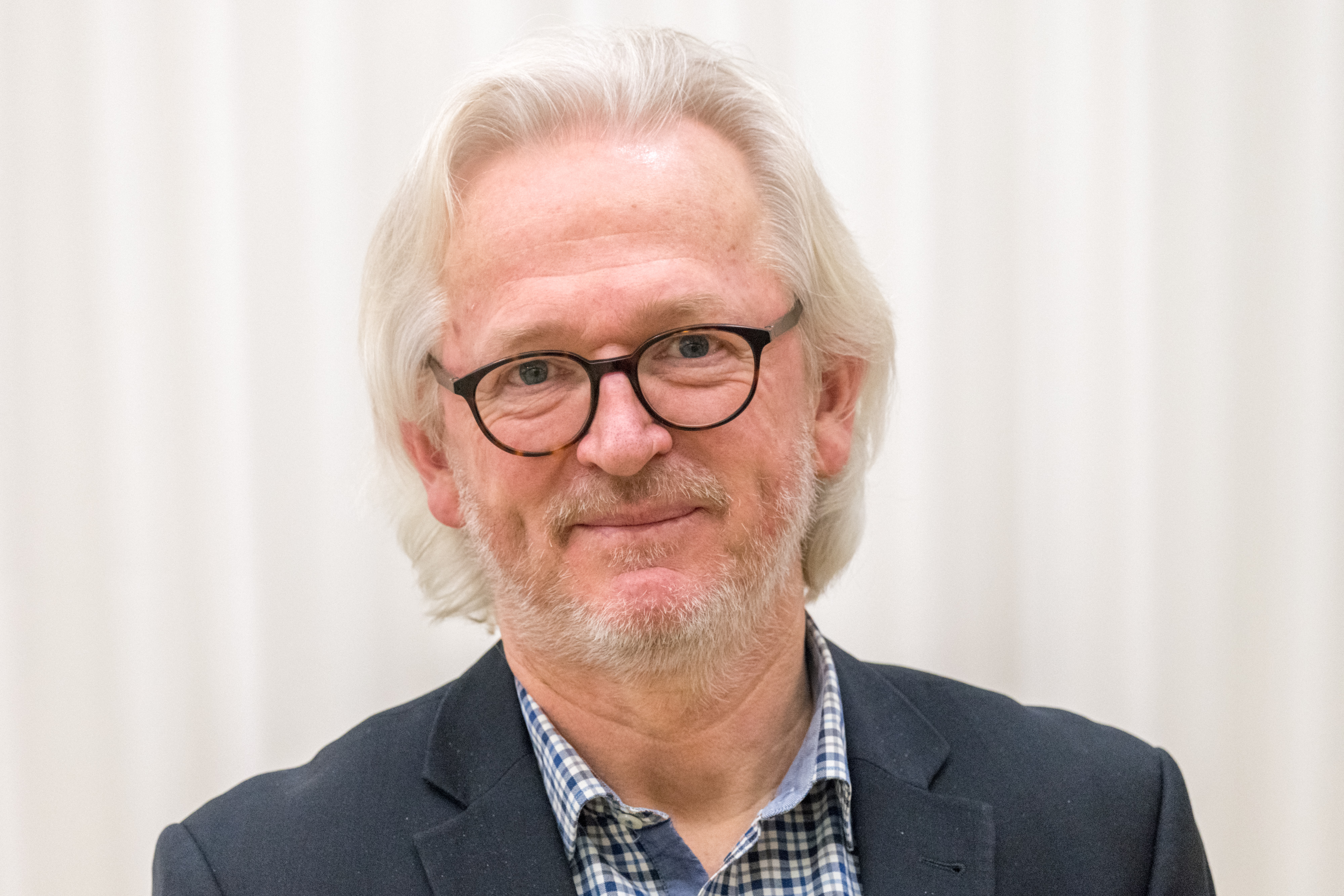
Image of Luger Maximilian Rudolf

Maximilian Rudolf Luger (born 1958, in Kleinzell im Mühlkreis) is an Austrian architect, interior designer, industrial designer, and civil engineer, who has lectured at the Carinthia University of Applied Sciences, and the Rosenheim University of Applied Sciences. A graduate of the University of Art and Design Linz, he has received a Kulturpreis des Landes Oberösterreich and a Heinrich Gleißner Prize.
