= Franz Maul =

Austrian architect (born 1954)

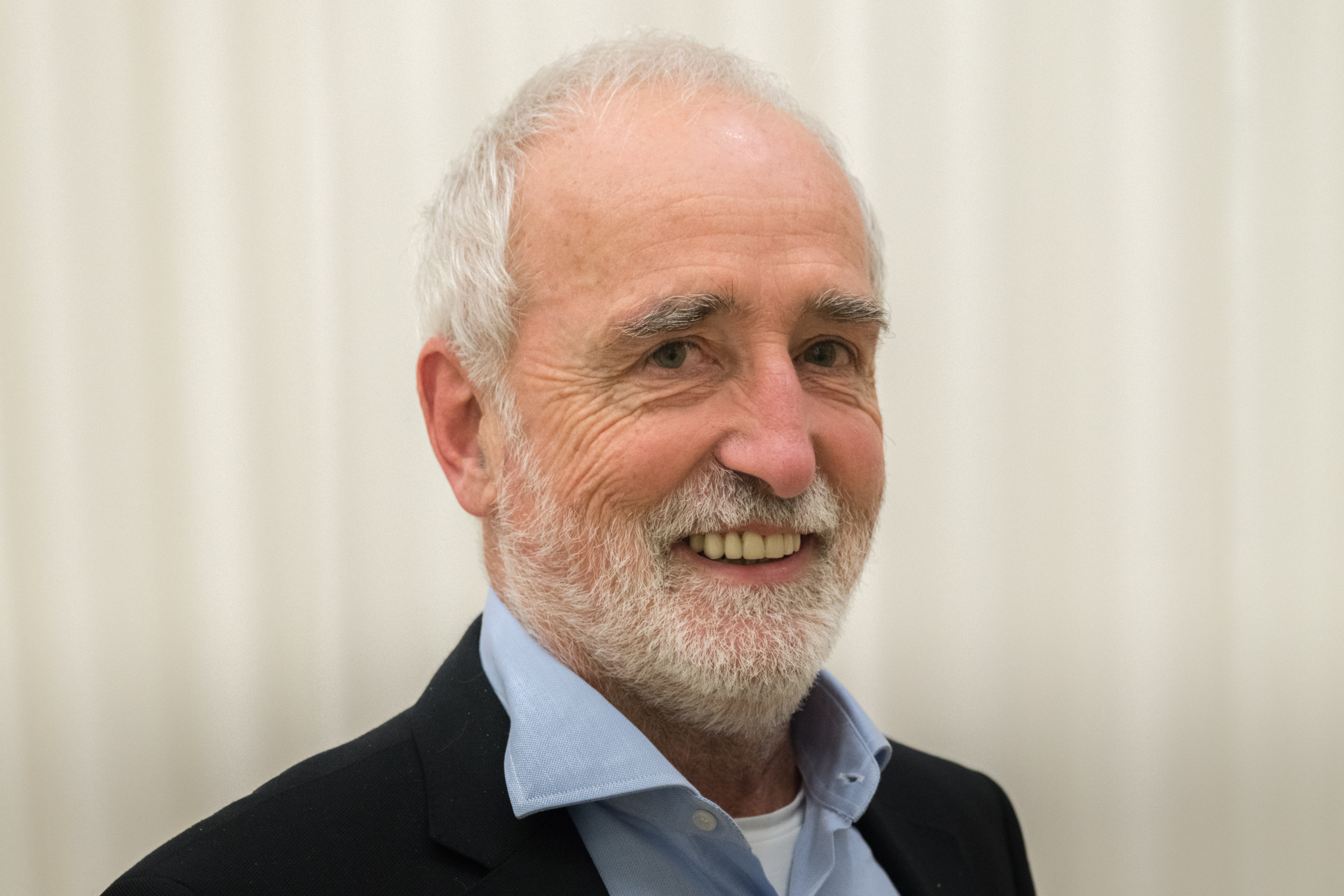
Image of F. J. Maul

Franz Josef Maul (born 1954, in Nußdorf am Attersee) is an Austrian architect and civil engineer. A graduate of the University of Art and Design Linz, he has been the recipient of a Kulturpreis des Landes Oberösterreich and a Heinrich Gleißner Prize.
