= Fritz Fröhlich =

Austrian painter (1910–2001)

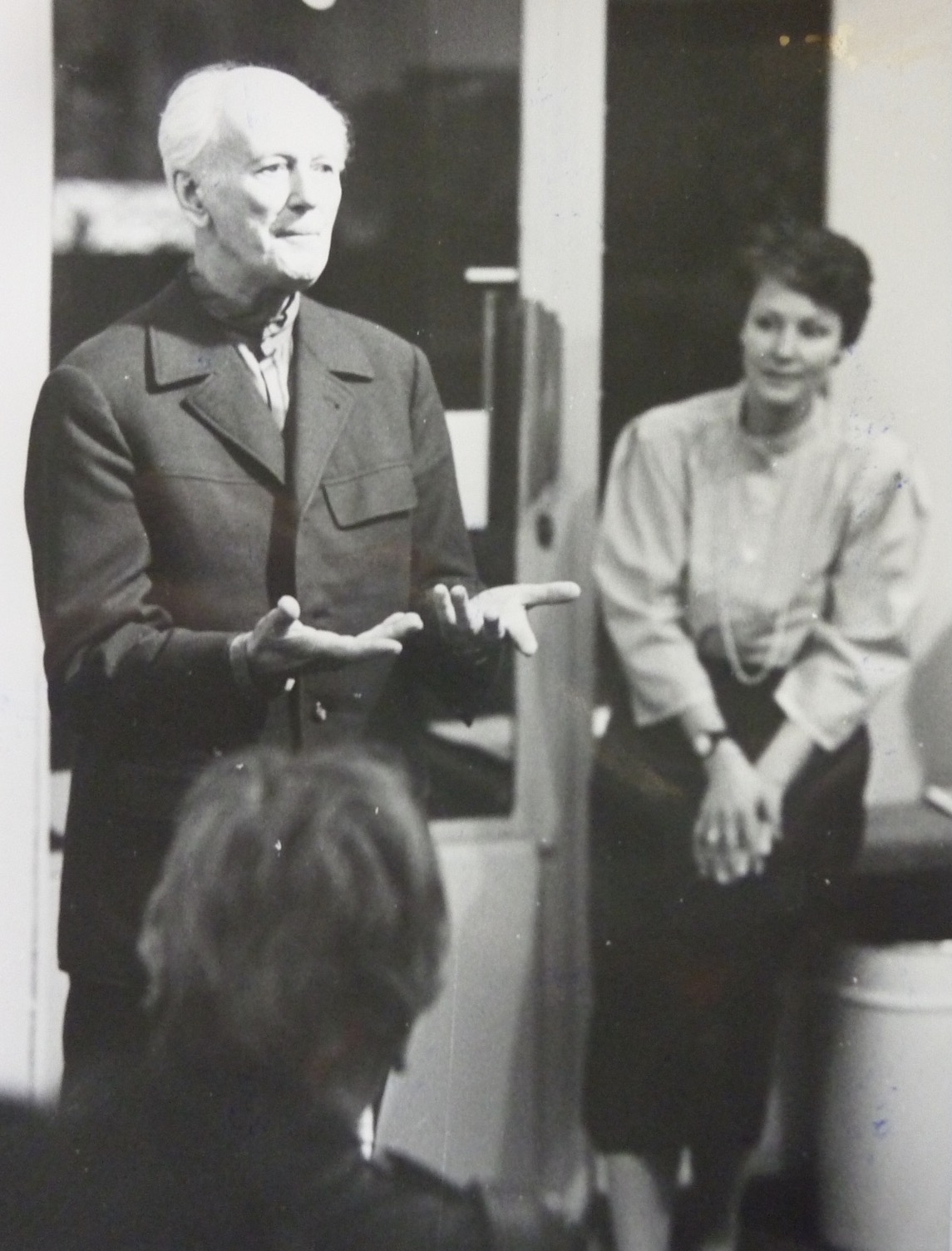
Image of Fritz Fröhlich

Fritz Fröhlich (13 May 1910, in Linz – 19 November 2001, in Linz) was an Austrian painter, best known for his cubist paintings and ceiling frescos at the Engelszell Abbey. His works have been exhibited at the Art Basel, the State Museum for Art and Cultural History, the Vienna State Opera. He was the recipient of an Austrian State Prize, an Austrian Decoration for Science and Art, a Kulturpreis des Landes Oberösterreich, and a Heinrich Gleißner Prize.
