= Emil Pirchan the Elder =

Austrian painter (1844–1928)

Emil Pirchan the Elder (21 May 1844, in Šebrov-Kateřina – 22 June 1928, in Vienna) was an Austrian painter, best remembered for his works in the academism school of art. He was one of Carl Rahl's final students at the Academy of Fine Arts Vienna. He is buried at the Hietzing Cemetery, and his works are in the collections of the Albertina. He is the father of set decorator Emil Pirchan.
