= Günter Rombold =

Austrian theologian and art historian (1925–2017)

Günter Rombold (2 January 1925, in Stuttgart – 10 December 2017, in Linz) was an Austrian theologian, art historian, philosopher and priest. A graduate of the Ludwig-Maximilians-Universität München, and the University of Graz, he served as rector and professor emeritus of the Catholic Private University Linz, and was a curator for the Lentos Art Museum and served on the jury of the Academy of Fine Arts Vienna. He was the recipient of a Kulturpreis des Landes Oberösterreich and a Heinrich Gleißner Prize.
