= Hans Eichhorn =

Austrian poet (1956–2020)

Hans Eichhorn (13 February 1956, in Vöcklabruck – 29 February 2020, in Attersee am Attersee) was an Austrian writer and poet, best remembered for his absurdist and laconic poetry. He was the recipient of a Kulturpreis des Landes Oberösterreich, and a Heinrich Gleißner Prize.
