= Petrinum Linz =

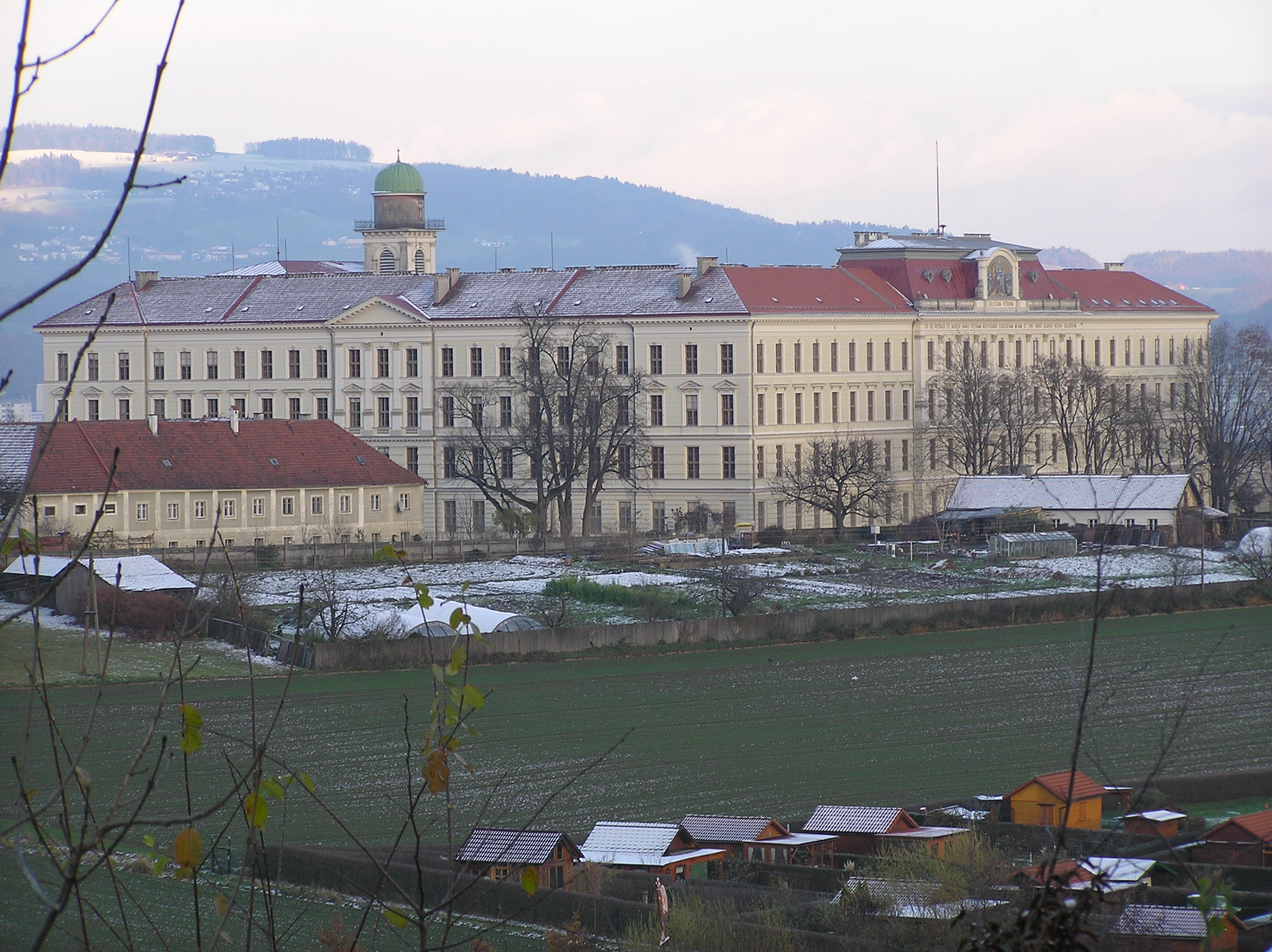
- Petrinum in Linz
- Linz; Austria

Information
- Type: Private school
- Religious affiliation: Catholic
- Established: 2 July 1896
- Website: Homepage of the Bischöfliches Gymnasium Petrinum

The Bischöfliches Gymnasium Petrinum (German pronunciation: [ˌpeˈtʀiːnʊm]) is a Catholic private school of the Diocese of Linz situated on the slopes of Poestlingberg hill in Urfahr, which is a part of Linz.

== History ==
On 2 July 1896 the building works began. The imposing structure, which is said to have nearly a thousand windows, housed the Gymnasium and an associated boarding home. The institution, originally thought to educated future priests and prepare them for their time at the seminary, soon became one of the leading schools in Upper Austria. In 1903 it was visited by the emperor Franz Joseph I.

During World War I, the school was used as a military hospital, which caused the erection of the Kriegerfriedhof (cemetery for dead soldiers). After the Anschluss of Austria by Germany in 1938, Hitler planned to turn the school into a technical college These plans forced the disruption of the studies at Petrinum, but were never finally carried out. After World War II, at first the red army occupied the house, the regular education being resumed only not until 1946.

The boarding home is now closed, the school being co-educational since 1993.

== Notable alumni ==
- Alois Brandstetter – Austrian writer
- Rudolf Habringer – Austrian writer, journalist, comedian and pianist
- Augustinus Franz Kropfreiter – Austrian composer
- Josef Pühringer – governor of Upper-Austria
- Franz Rieger – Austrian writer
- Manfred Scheuer – Bishop of Linz
- Peter Paul Wiplinger – Austrian writer and photographer
