= Margit Palme =

Austrian painter (1939–2025)

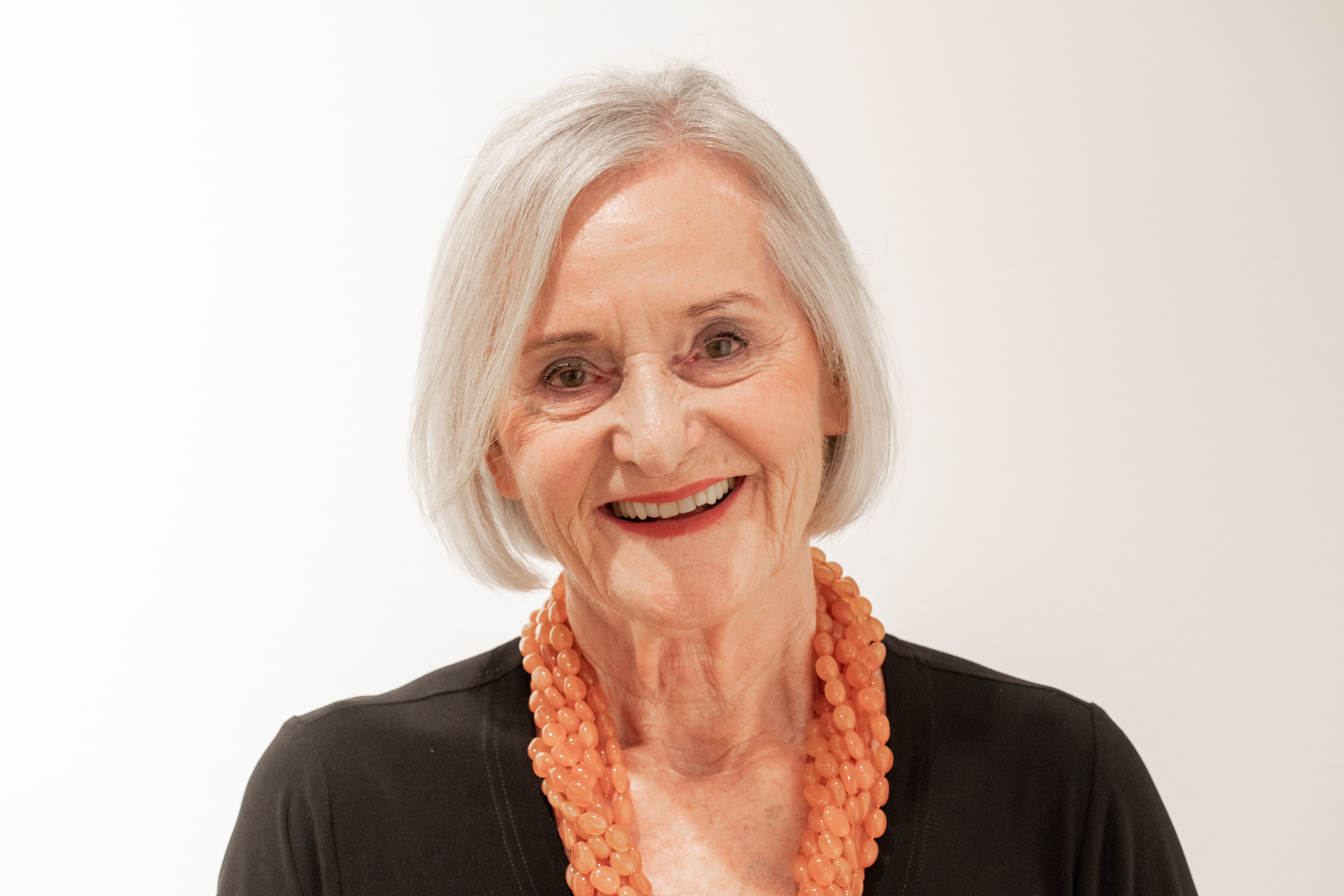
Image of Margit Palme

Margit Palme (11 August 1939 – 23 June 2025) was an Austrian painter, best known for her aquatint etchings. A graduate of the University of Art and Design Linz, she exhibited at the Lentos Art Museum, and was the recipient of a Heinrich Gleißner Prize. Palme died on 23 June 2025, at the age of 85.
