= Margit Schreiner =

Austrian writer (born 1953)

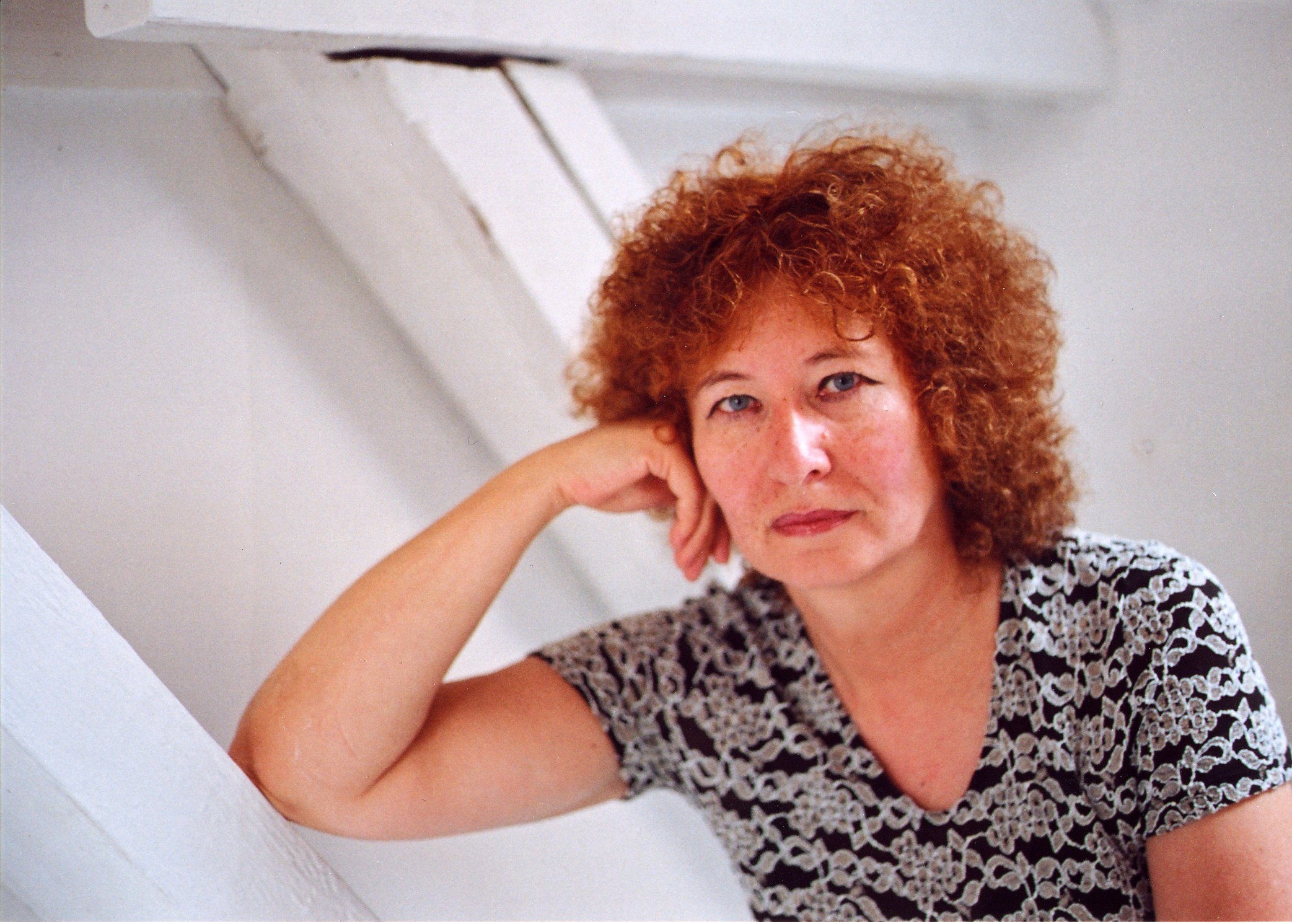
Image of Margit Schreiner

Margit Schreiner (born 22 December 1953, in Linz) is an Austrian writer and novelist, best known for her humanist and feminist novels. A graduate of the University of Salzburg, she is a member of the Grazer Autorenversammlung, and has been the recipient of an Anton Wildgans Prize, a Kulturpreis des Landes Oberösterreich, and a Heinrich Gleißner Prize.
