= Heinrich Gattermeyer =

Austrian composer and music educator (1923–2018)

Heinrich Gattermeyer (9 July 1923 – 5 July 2018) was an Austrian composer and music educator.

== Life ==
Born in Sierning, Gattermeyer, son of the local poet Karl Gattermeyer, graduated in 1941 at the Akademisches Gymnasium Linz and was subsequently drafted for military service.

After the war, he studied piano with Bruno Seidlhofer, Choral conducting and conducting with Ferdinand Grossmann, as well as composition with Alfred Uhl at the University of Music and Performing Arts Vienna from 1945 to 1950. He also completed studies in German at the University of Vienna, graduating in 1948/49 with a teaching certificate.

Initially Gattermeyer taught at Viennese grammar schools and from 1964 at the University of Music and Performing Arts Vienna.

Gattermeyer was president of the Austrian Society for Contemporary Music for eleven years from 1973, from 1984 to 1990 president of the AKM Authors, Composers and Music Publishers, from 1992 to 2001 president of the Austrian Composers Association and from 1996 was president of the Dommusikverein am St. Stephen's Cathedral, Vienna, which existed until 2005. Gattermeyer also served as choirmaster for several Viennese choirs, including the Wiener Schubertbund from 1960 to 1973. Gattermeyer died in Vienna at the age of 94 and was buried at Ober Sankt Veiter Friedhof.

Among his notable students is Lukas Ligeti.

== Awards ==
- 1964: Österreichisches Ehrenzeichen für Wissenschaft und Kunst.
- 1971: Förderungspreis der Stadt Wien für Musik.
- 1980: Kulturpreis des Landes Oberösterreich für den Bereich Musik
- 1981: Decoration of Honour for Services to the Republic of Austria.
- 1982: Preis der Stadt Wien für Musik.
- 1992: Großes Silbernes Ehrenzeichen für Verdienste um die Republik Österreich.
- 2005: Kulturmedaille des Landes Oberösterreich.
- 2006: Heinrich Gleißner Prize.

== Work ==
=== Ensemble music ===
- Sizilianisches Trinklied – Quintett für drei Pauken, zwei Klaviere und Männerchor, text Ernst Jirgal (1958)
- Die drei goldenen Blumen – Schattenspiel für 9 Instrumente (1966)
- Der Wundergarten – Schattenspiel für 9 Instrumente (1966)
- Der Wunschverkäufer – Schattenspiel für 9 Instrumente (1966)
- Der Faulpelz – Schattenspiel für 9 Instrumente (1968)
- Miniaturen – für Flöte und Gitarre (1968)
- Miniaturen und Bagatellen – für Flöte und Harfe (1968)
- Die drei Brüder – Schattenspiel für 9 Instrumente (1968)
- Tara, der Indianer – Schattenspiel für 9 Instrumente (1969)
- Jussuf, der Wasserträger – Schattenspiel für 9 Instrumente (1969)
- Der Froschkönig – Schattenspiel für 9 Instrumente (1969)
- Der Vogelschreck – Schattenspiel für 9 Instrumente (1969)
- Kalif Storch – Schattenspiel für 9 Instrumente (1970)
- Koch und Schneider – Schattenspiel für 9 Instrumente (1970)
- Die Mittagszauberin – Schattenspiel für 9 Instrumente (1970)
- Rumpelstilzchen – Schattenspiel für 9 Instrumente (1970)
- Der Wunderdoktor – Schattenspiel für 9 Instrumente (1970)
- Reginald, der Erfinder – Schattenspiel für 9 Instrumente (1971)
- Die Spieluhr – Schattenspiel für 9 Instrumente (1971)
- Alexander und der Bär – Schattenspiel für 9 Instrumente (1971)
- Das Märchen von der harten Nuß – Fernseh-Märchen für 9 Instrumente (1970)
- Der Spaßvogel – Schattenspiel für 9 Instrumente (1971)
- Prinzessin Fadina – Schattenspiel für 9 Instrumente (1971)
- Das Wunderbare Fernrohr – Schattenspiel für 9 Instrumente (1971)
- Zwergnase – Schattenspiel für 9 Instrumente (1971)
- Die kluge Bauerntochter – Schattenspiel für 9 Instrumente (1971)
- Der Bärenführer – Schattenspiel für 9 Instrumente (1971)
- Reichtum und Glück – Schattenspiel für 9 Instrumente (1971)
- Divertimento – Septett für zwei Blockflöten, Perkussion, Klavier vierhändig, Violine und Kontrabass (1971)
- Sechs Grotesken – Duo für Klavier und Viola (1971)
- Concertino da camera – Trio für Oboe, Gitarre und Klavier (1972)
- Das kalte Herz – Schattenspiel für 9 Instrumente (1973)
- Des Kaisers neue Kleider – Schattenspiel für 9 Instrumente (1973)
- Das verwunschene Schloß – Schattenspiel für 9 Instrumente (1973)
- Der schlaue Gärtner – Schattenspiel für 9 Instrumente (1975)
- Drei Episoden (duet) – für Viola und Kontrabass (1977)
- An Joseph Haydn – für Violoncello und Klavier (1983)
- Phantastischer Dialog – für Orgel, 3 Trompeten, 3 Posaunen, 3 Schlagzeuger (1984)
- Perioden-Quartett – für Flöte, Violine, Viola und Kontrabass (1986)
- Max und Moritz – Quintett mit Stimme für Flöte, Klarinette, Perkussion, Klavier, Kontrabass und Bariton-Solo nach Wilhelm Busch (1993)
- Harte Zeiten – Trio für 2 Violinen und Klavier (1993)
- Millenniums-Duo – für zwei Klaviere (1996)

=== Solo music ===
- Ballade – für Klavier (1947)
- Intermezzo – für Klavier (1947)
- Zwei Impressionen – für Klavier (1958)
- Sonata misteriosa – für Klavier (1958)
- Ludus multiplex – für Klavier (1961)
- Stücke für die Jugend – für Klavier (1963)
- Skolion – für Klavier (1969)
- Sieben Stücke für kleine Pianisten – für Klavier (1972)
- Zwei Arabesken – für Klavier (1972)
- Sechs Etüden – für Gitarre (1979)
- Rhythmische Modelle – für Klavier (1980)
- Besenbinder Variationen – für Violine (1983)
- Koreanische Impressionen – für Klavier (1984)
- Drei Modellvariationen – für Klavier (1992)
- Augustinus-Hymnus – für Orgel (1996)

=== Vocal music ===
- Missa Bernardi – Für Männerchor und Streichorchester (ad lib.) (1959)
- Ave Maria – für gemischten Chor (1961)
- Festmusik für kleine Leute – für Kinderchor und zwei Flöten, zwei Klarinette, vier Hörner, zwei Trompeten, zwei Klaviere und Perkussion (1967)
- Katermärchen – für gemischten Chor (1971)
- Rüben-Ballade – für gemischten Chor (1971)
- Würfel-Chorus – für Männerchor (1971)
- Das Falala – für gemischten Chor (1972)
- Fanget an – für Männerchor (1972)
- Landsknechtliebe – für Männerchor (1973)
- Trakl-Fragmente – Klavierfassung für Chor (1974)
- Confitebor tibi – für gemischten Chor (1979)
- Vier Chöre – aus dem Tier-Zyklus (1989)
- Sieg des Lebens – für gemischten Chor und Männerchor, Blechbläser, Streichorchester und Schlagzeug (1998)
