= Alois Brandstetter =

Austrian writer (born 1938)

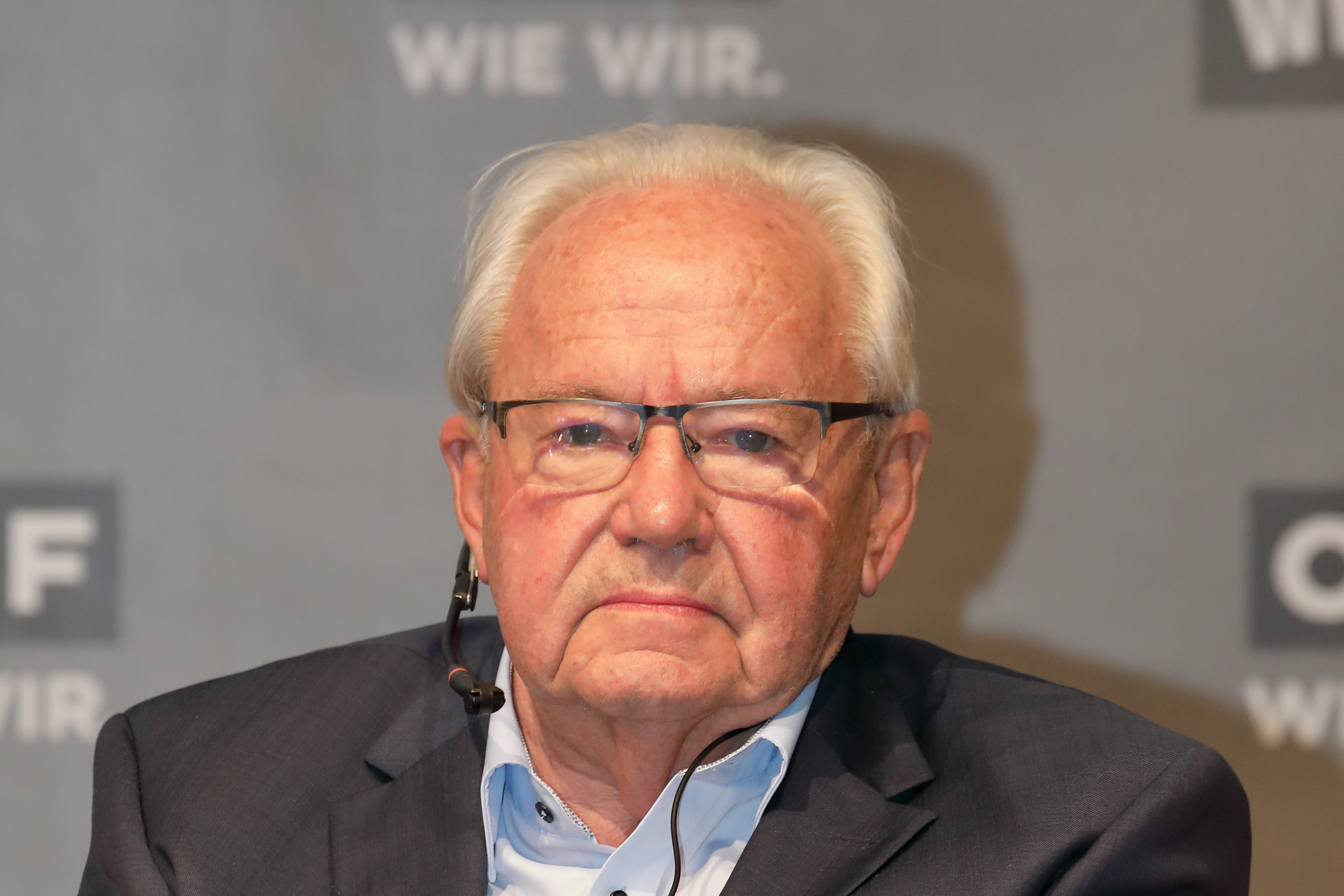
Alois Brandstetter

Alois Brandstetter (born 5 December 1938, in Pichl bei Wels) is an Austrian writer and philologist. A graduate of Petrinum Linz, and the University of Vienna, he was a researcher for Old Germanic studies at the Saarland University, and was later a professor at the University of Salzburg and the University of Klagenfurt. He has a received an Austrian Decoration for Science and Art, a Kulturpreis des Landes Oberösterreich, and Heinrich Gleißner Prize.
