= Hans Puchhammer =

Austrian architect (born 1931)

Hans Puchhammer (born 13 May 1931, in Wels) is an Austrian architect, who served as chair of the Monuments Board of the Federal Monuments Office from 1998 to 2003. A graduate of the Vienna University of Technology, he has received a Kulturpreis des Landes Oberösterreich and a Heinrich Gleißner Prize.
