= Therese Eisenmann =

Austrian graphic artist (born 1953)

Therese Eisenmann (born 1953, in Gosau) is an Austrian graphic artist best known for her etchings of nature and animal motifs. A graduate of the University of Art and Design Linz, she was an artist-in-residence in Iceland, and is the recipient of a Kulturpreis des Landes Oberösterreich and a Heinrich Gleißner Prize.
