= Maria Moser =

Austrian painter (born 1948)

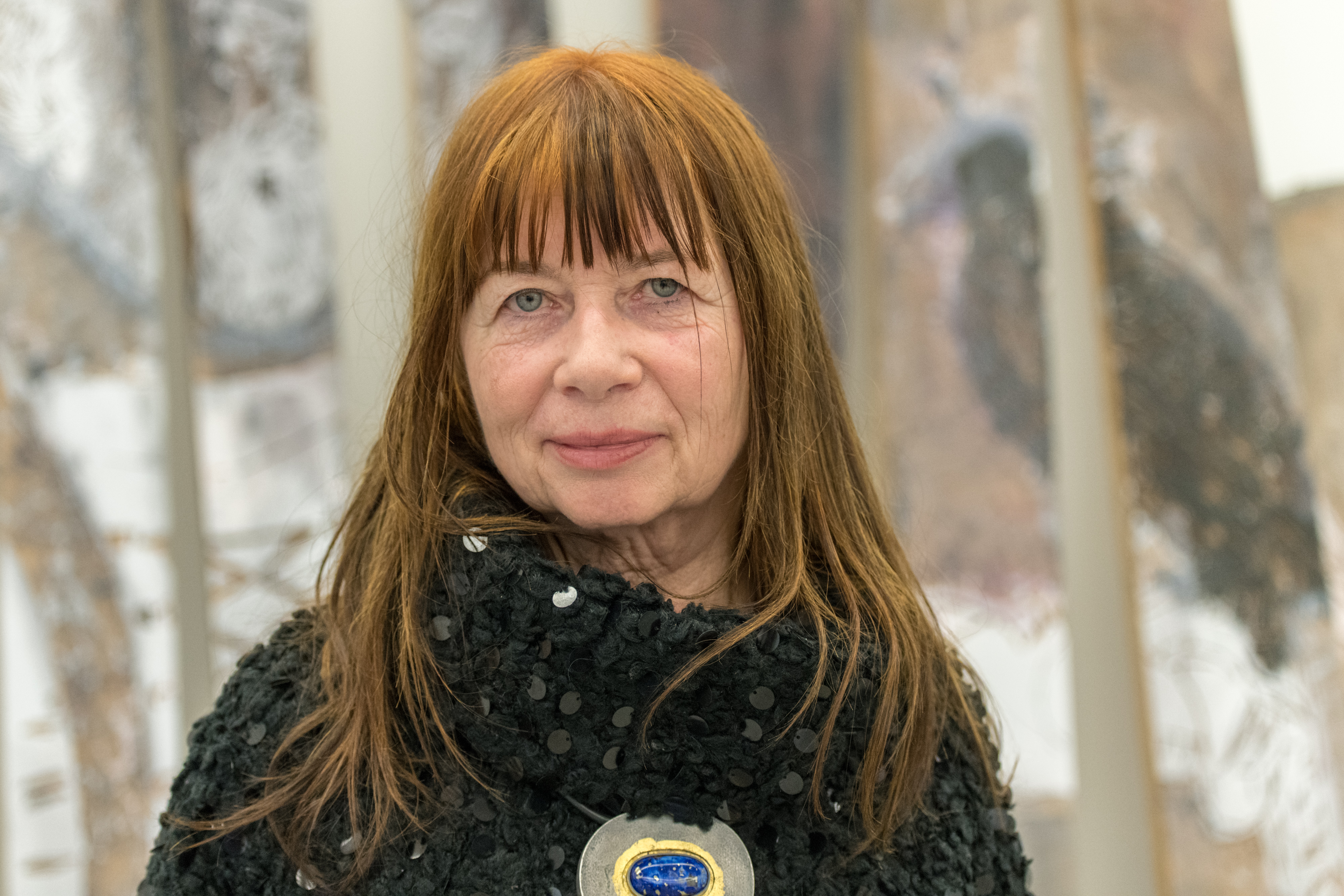
Maria Moser

Maria Moser (born 2 August 1948, in Frankenburg am Hausruck) is an Austrian painter, who has exhibited at the Vienna Künstlerhaus. A graduate of the Academy of Fine Arts Vienna, she has received a Kulturpreis des Landes Oberösterreich and a Heinrich Gleißner Prize.
