= Rudolf Hoflehner =

Austrian artist (1916–1995)

- Born: 1916; Linz
- Died: 1995 (aged 78–79); Pantaneto
- Resting place: Vienna Central Cemetery
- Education: Academy of Fine Arts Vienna
- Known for: Sculpture

Rudolf Hoflehner (1916 – 1995) was an Austrian artist, sculptor, and graphic artist. His works are in the collections of the Museum der Moderne Salzburg, the Museum of Modern Art, the Österreichische Galerie Belvedere, the State Academy of Fine Arts Stuttgart, and the Tate Modern. A graduate of the Academy of Fine Arts Vienna, he served in the Wehrmacht during the Second World War. He has been the recipient of the Berliner Kunstpreis, the Grand Austrian State Prize, the Order of Merit of Baden-Württemberg, the Kulturpreis des Landes Oberösterreich, and the Heinrich Gleißner Prize. He was buried in an honorary grave at the Vienna Central Cemetery.
