= Gerlinde Miesenböck =

Austrian photographer (born 1978)

Gerlinde Miesenböck (born 1978, in Freistadt) is an Austrian photographer, best known for her contemporary art style. A graduate of the University of Art and Design Linz, Manchester Metropolitan University, and University of Lapland, her works have been exhibited at the Lentos Art Museum, the Los Angeles Center for Digital Art, and the Bluecoat Chambers. She is also the recipient of a Heinrich Gleißner Promotional Prize.
