= Anna Maria Brandstätter =

Austrian painter (born 1977)

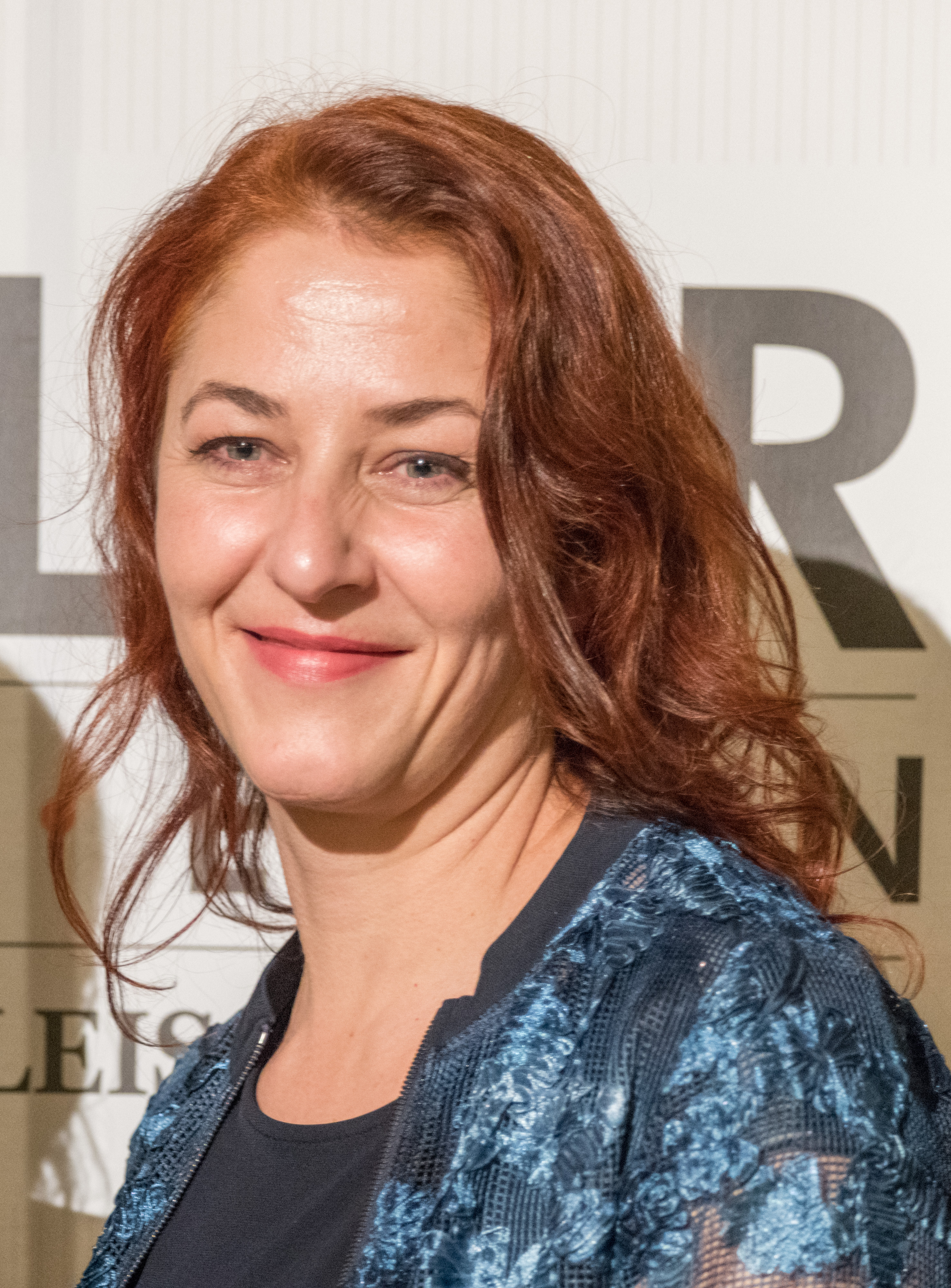
Image of Anna Maria

Anna Maria Brandstätter (born 1977, in Amstetten) is an Austrian painter and graphic artist, best known for her etchings. A graduate of the University of Art and Design Linz, she has exhibited at the Strindbergmuseum Saxen, and has received a Heinrich Gleißner Promotional Prize.
