= Thomas Doss =

Austrian composer and conductor (born 1966)

Thomas Doss (born 6 June 1966, in Linz) is an Austrian composer and conductor, best known for his work with wind ensembles. He has conducted the Vienna Chamber Orchestra since 1988 and has taught at the Music and Arts University of the City of Vienna. A graduate of the Anton Bruckner Private University, the University of Music and Performing Arts Vienna, the Mozarteum, and the Maastricht Academy of Music, he has been the recipient of the Kulturpreis des Landes Oberösterreich and the Heinrich Gleißner Prize.
