= Friedrich Zauner =

Austrian writer (1936–2022)

Friedrich Ch. Zauner (19 September 1936, in Rainbach im Innkreis – 30 November 2022, in Schärding) was an Austrian novelist and playwright, best remembered for his tetralogy Das Ende der Ewigkeit, published between 1992 and 1996. He was the recipient of a Kulturpreis des Landes Oberösterreich and a Heinrich Gleißner Prize.
