= Franz Rieger (writer) =

Austrian writer (1923–2005)

Franz Josef Rieger (23 January 1923, in Riedau – 11 June 2005, in Oftering) was an Austrian writer, best remembered for his novel Schattenschweigen oder Hartheim (1985) about the Hartheim killing centre from when he was drafted into the Reich Labour Service. He was the recipient of a Kulturpreis des Landes Oberösterreich and a Heinrich Gleißner Prize.
