= Alois Dorn =

Austrian visual artist (1908–1985)

Alois Dorn (20 May 1908 - 24 August 1985) was an Austrian visual artist known in particular as a sculptor, a painter, a glass-painter and a creator of mosaics.

== Biography ==
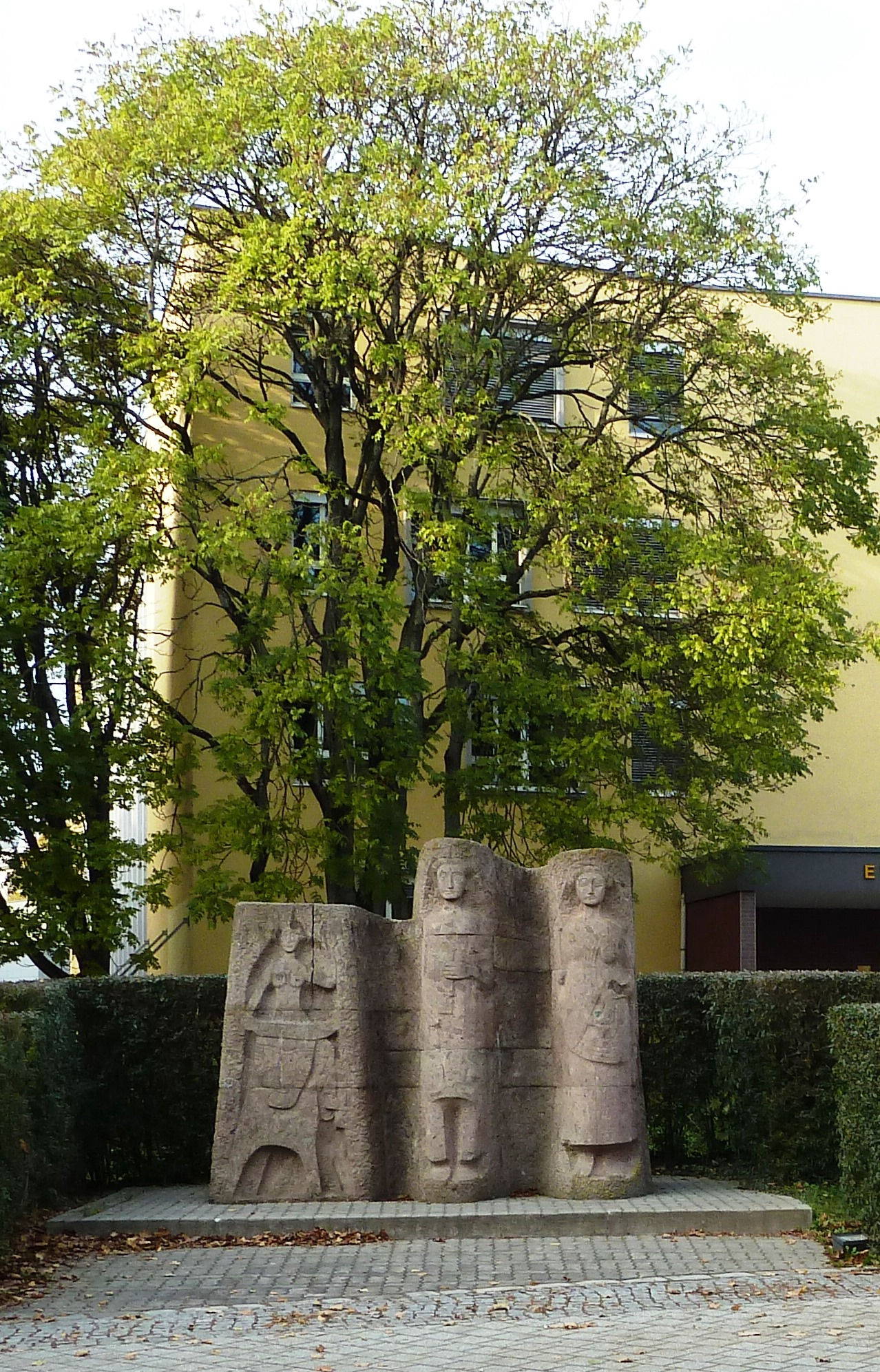
1961

Alois Dorn was born at Mühlheim am Inn, a rural village in Upper Austria approximately equidistant between Munich and Linz: he grew up in conditions of some poverty in nearby Suben am Inn. He was one of the ten recorded children of the small businessman Johann Dorn and his wife, born Maria Karl. Several of his siblings would also pursue artistic careers, including the sculptor Conrad Dorn (1915–1987) and the artist Johanna Dorn-Fladerer (1913–1988). He attended junior school in Suben and middle school ("Bürgerschule") in the regional capital, Schärding. That was followed by his first piece of vocational training, which set him on course for his subsequent career: he attended the woodwork academy ("Fachschule für Holzbearbeitung") at Hallstatt. A flavour of his life at this time can be found in the short story "Eine kleine schwarze hölzerne Hand" ("A little black wooden hand") by Gertrud Fussenegger whom some time later, in 1950, Alois Dorn married. Working with wood would remain a particular preference during his career.

Between 1927 and 1933 Alois Dorn studied at the prestigious Academy of Fine Arts ("Akademie der Bildenden Künste") in Munich, emerging with as "Akademischer Bildhauer" qualification. At Munich he was a "Master Student", studying under Joseph Wackerle. Dorn was seeing himself at this time primarily as an "architectural sculptor", producing figures and decorations suitable for imposing public buildings rather than as a producer of free-standing forms for exhibitions in museums and parks.

Between 1933 and 1939 Dorn was working in Munich as a fashionable freelance sculptor. Most of his pieces remained in Bavaria and many of the more significant ones were prominently displayed in Munich. Partly on account of this, much of his work was degraded or destroyed by British and American aerial bombing during the Second World War. In 1933 the National Socialists had taken power and transformed the country into a one-party dictatorship which lasted for slightly more than twelve years. Austria was formally integrated into Nazi Germany in 1938. Through the filter of subsequent decades, most available sources are silent on the details of Alois Dorn's relationship with National Socilialism during these years. According to at least one source, however, Alois Dorn became a party member in May 1938. Although he was not much of a political activist, there are instances that can be adduced to show that he was broadly sympathetic towards aspects of government policy that mainstream opinion after 1945 found deeply unpalatable. Investigation of Dorn's own archived papers indicates that in 1935 he became a member of the Reichskammer der bildenden Künste (loosely, "National Chamber of Visual Arts", the organisation for visual artists created by the party, membership of which would greatly have eased his professional progress under the dictatorship.

After 1945 Dorn was released from war service: he set up a studio in his parents' house. Between 1949 and 1951 he was professionally active in Salzburg. He married Gertrud Fussenegger in 1950 The couple's son Lukas was born the next year. There were also already four children in the family from Gertrud's first marriage which had ended in divorce during the war. Between 1952 and 1960 the family lived at Solbad Hall (as the town was called between 1938 and 1974) where Gertrud had been living since 1943. In 1960 or 1961 they moved to Upper Austria, which for Alois Dorn represented a return to his roots, and where they now settled at Leonding, a small prosperous town just outside Linz.

During the final decades of his life the title of "Professor" was conferred on Alois Dorn. He became a member of the Linz-based "MAERZ" arts association which had been relaunched in 1952, and was also, like his brother Conrad and his sister Johanna, a member of the "Inn Region Artists' Guild" ("Innviertler Künstlergilde") in the region of his birth, to the west of Linz.

Alois Dorn died in Linz on 24 August 1985. He was buried in the cemetery by the church of St. Gallus at Gallneukirchen, which contains several examples of his art, and where at the time of his death he had recently completed his final major commission, a mosaic on the cemetery wall showing the Stations of the Cross, intended to "join the commemoration of the dead with the Passion of Our Lord". Slightly less than quarter of a century later, following the death of Gertrud Fussenegger, the mortal remains of Alois Dorn were dug up and removed to the cemetery at Leonding, near the home the couple had shared.

== Output (selection) ==
- Europa auf dem Stier for the Platz vor der Münchner Universität
- Brunnen vor der Linzer Arbeiterkammer (1949; PDF-Datei; 686 kB)
- Denkmal für die Opfer beider Weltkriege in Wernstein am Inn (1953)
- Garnisons-Pionierdenkmal in Melk (1959)
- Europadenkmal vor der Europaschule Linz Lederergasse 35, Rathausviertel, Linz
- Gallustor und Mosaikbild für die Stadtpfarrkirche Gallneukirchen
- Kreuzweg aus Mosaikbildern an der Friedhofsmauer von Gallneukirchen (dazu ein Buch zusammen mit Gertrud Fussenegger) (PDF-Datei; 80 kB)
- Schulhausportal in München * Säulenkapitelle und 12 bronzene Kronleuchter für den Münchner Rathausfestsaal
- Gedenksäule in der Münchner Städtischen Kunstgalerie
- Geschnitzter Altar mit lebensgroßer Kreuzigungsgruppe in der Stadtpfarrkirche von Bad Aibling,
- Hl. Anna in der Kirche St. Andrä in Salzburg
- zahlreiche Porträts und Grabdenkmäler in Holz, Stein, Bronze, Terrakotta in München, Regensburg, Salzburg, Vorarlberg, Oberösterreich
- Plastische Gruppen und Figuren für die Porzellanmanufaktur Nymphenburg
- Reliefs im Verwaltungsgebäude der VOEST Linz
- Oil paintings, such as „ Hafen“, „Fische“, „Großer Blumenstrauß“
