= Karl Rössing =

Austrian artist (1897–1987)

Karl Rössing (25 September 1897, in Gmunden – 19 August 1987, in Wels) was an Austrian painter, graphic artist, and illustrator, best remembered for his surrealist and new objective works. He works have been exhibited at the Germanisches Nationalmuseum, the Palais Harrach, the Kunsthalle Bremen, the Bavarian National Museum, the National Gallery in Berlin, the Hamburger Kunsthalle, and the Staatsgalerie Stuttgart. His works have also been catalogued by the Staatliche Graphische Sammlung München. He was made a fellow of the State Academy of Fine Arts Stuttgart, and received the Heinrich Gleißner Prize in 1985.
