= Soběšice (Brno) =

- Cadastral territory of Brno
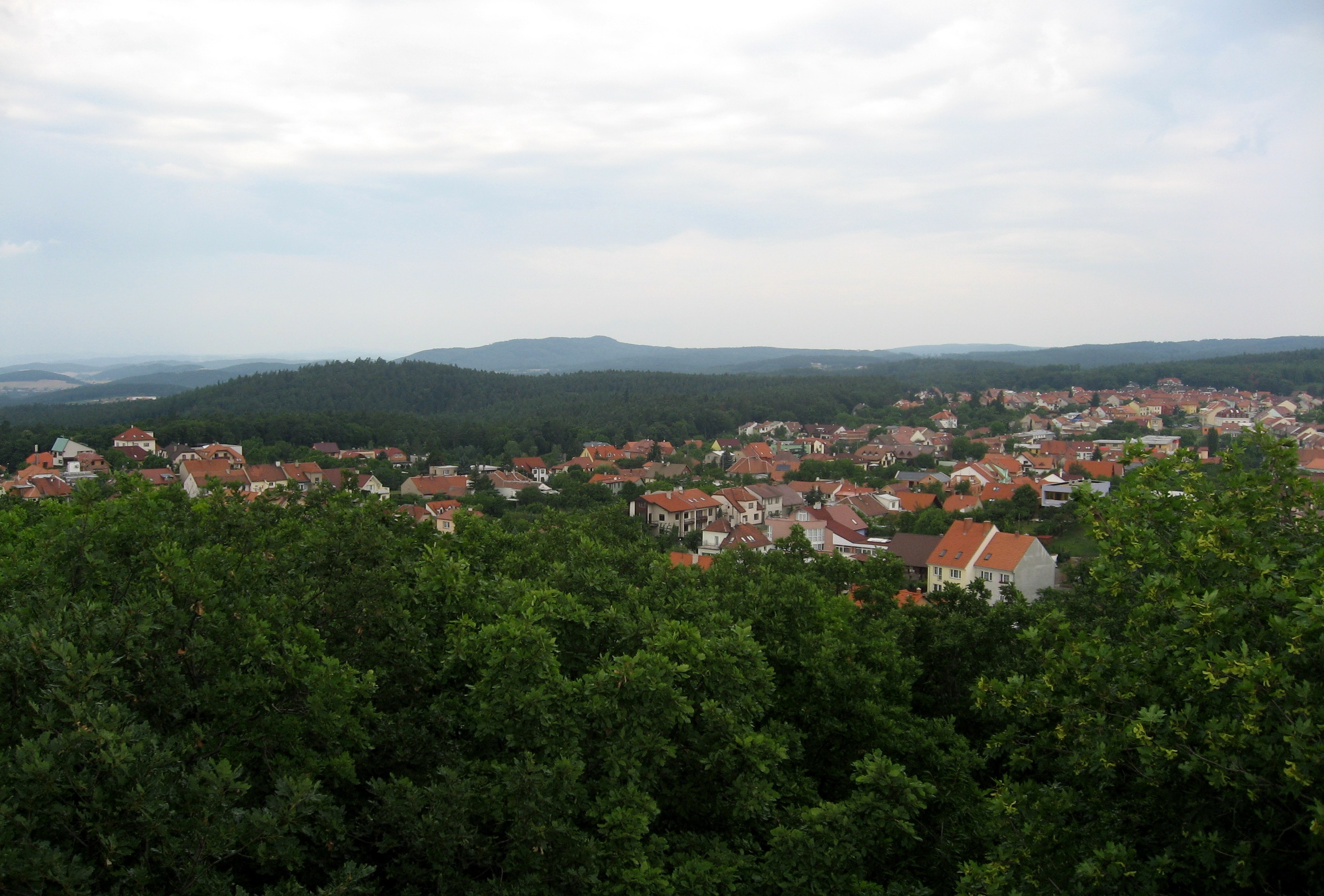
- View of Soběšice

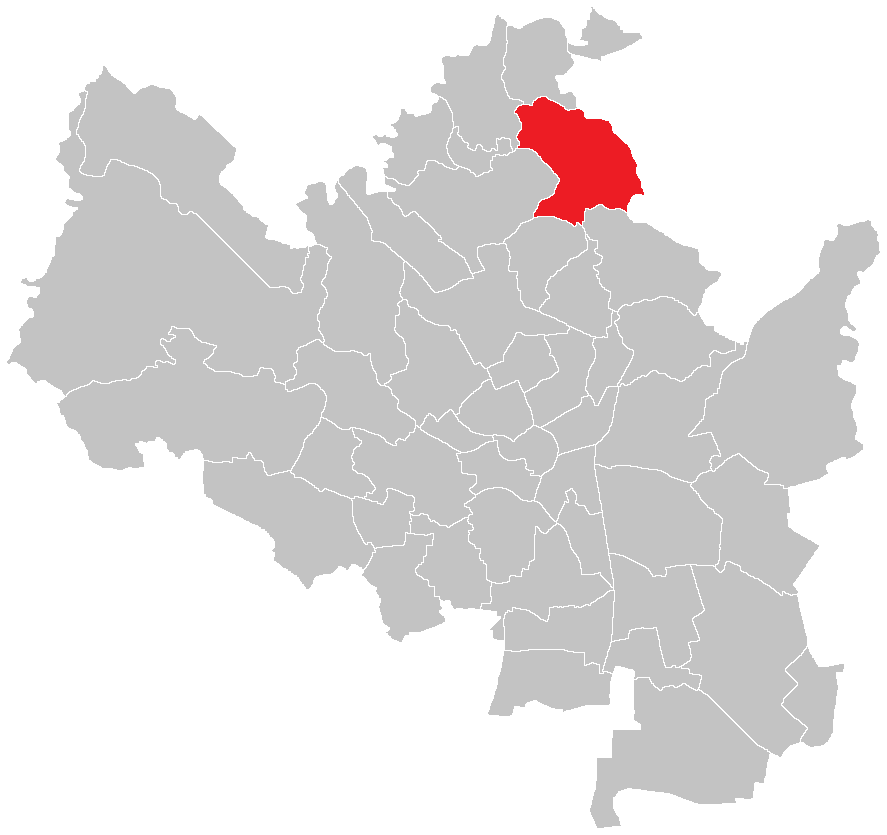
- Location of Soběšice in Brno 49°15′14″N 16°37′18″E
- Country: Czech Republic
- Region: South Moravian Region
- City: Brno
- City district: Brno-sever

Area
  - Total: 6.06 km^{2} (2.34 sq mi)

Population (2021)
  - Total: 2,494
  - Density: 412/km^{2} (1,070/sq mi)
- Time zone: UTC+1 (CET)
  - Summer (DST): UTC+2 (CEST)
- Postal code: 644 00

Soběšice (German: Obeschitz) is a municipal part and cadastral territory on the northern edge of the city of Brno, Czech Republic. It has an area of 6.06 km^{2}. Originally an independent municipality, it was annexed into Brno in 1971, and since November 24, 1990 it is a part of the city district of Brno-sever. About 2,500 people live here.

== History ==
The first written mention of Soběšice dates from 1286. In 1900, 733 people lived here. Soběšice was annexed to Brno on November 26, 1971, and incorporated into the Brno III municipal district. Of the 352 local citizens present, 352 voted for joining Brno and only 19 were against. After the annexation, street names in Soběšice whose names were identical to the names of streets in the rest of the city were renamed. Soběšice remained within the Brno III district until 1990, when the current city district of Brno-sever was established.

== Territorial divisions ==
The cadastral territory of Soběšice is further divided into 2 basic settlement units, of which Soběšice-jih (Soběšice-South) has all of the population.

Basic settlement unit	Population		
Basic settlement unit	2011	2021	Change
Soběšice-jih	2,265	2,494	+10.1%
Soběšice-sever	0	0	+0%

== Demographics ==
Historical population

Year	Pop.	±%
1869	332	—
1880	509	+53.3%
1890	610	+19.8%
1900	733	+20.2%
1910	998	+36.2%

Year	Pop.	±%
1921	1,031	+3.3%
1930	1,063	+3.1%
1950	1,117	+5.1%
1961	1,149	+2.9%
1970	1,108	−3.6%

Year	Pop.	±%
1980	1,157	+4.4%
1991	1,078	−6.8%
2001	1,475	+36.8%
2011	2,265	+53.6%
2021	2,494	+10.1%

Source: Censuses

== Transport ==
Daily transport connections are provided by the public transport company of Brno via bus line no. 57 running from Tomkovo náměstí stop through Štefánikova čtvrť and Lesná to Soběšice, mostly as far as Útěchov, sometimes continuing to Vranov, and trolleybus line no. 30 running from Bystrc via the railway station in Královo Pole to Soběšice, whose operation is provided by trolleybuses. At night, the connection is provided by bus No. 93 from the main railway station.
