= Heinrich Gleißner Prize =

Austrian culture prize

The Heinrich Gleißner Prize is an Upper Austrian Cultural Award named after Heinrich Gleißner.

== Prize ==
The main prize honours an artist's previous work and life's work in various fields (music, literature, architecture, painting). The prize, which has been awarded since 1985, is endowed with 5000 euros. In addition, an encouragement prize is awarded, endowed with 2000 euros.

== Laureates ==
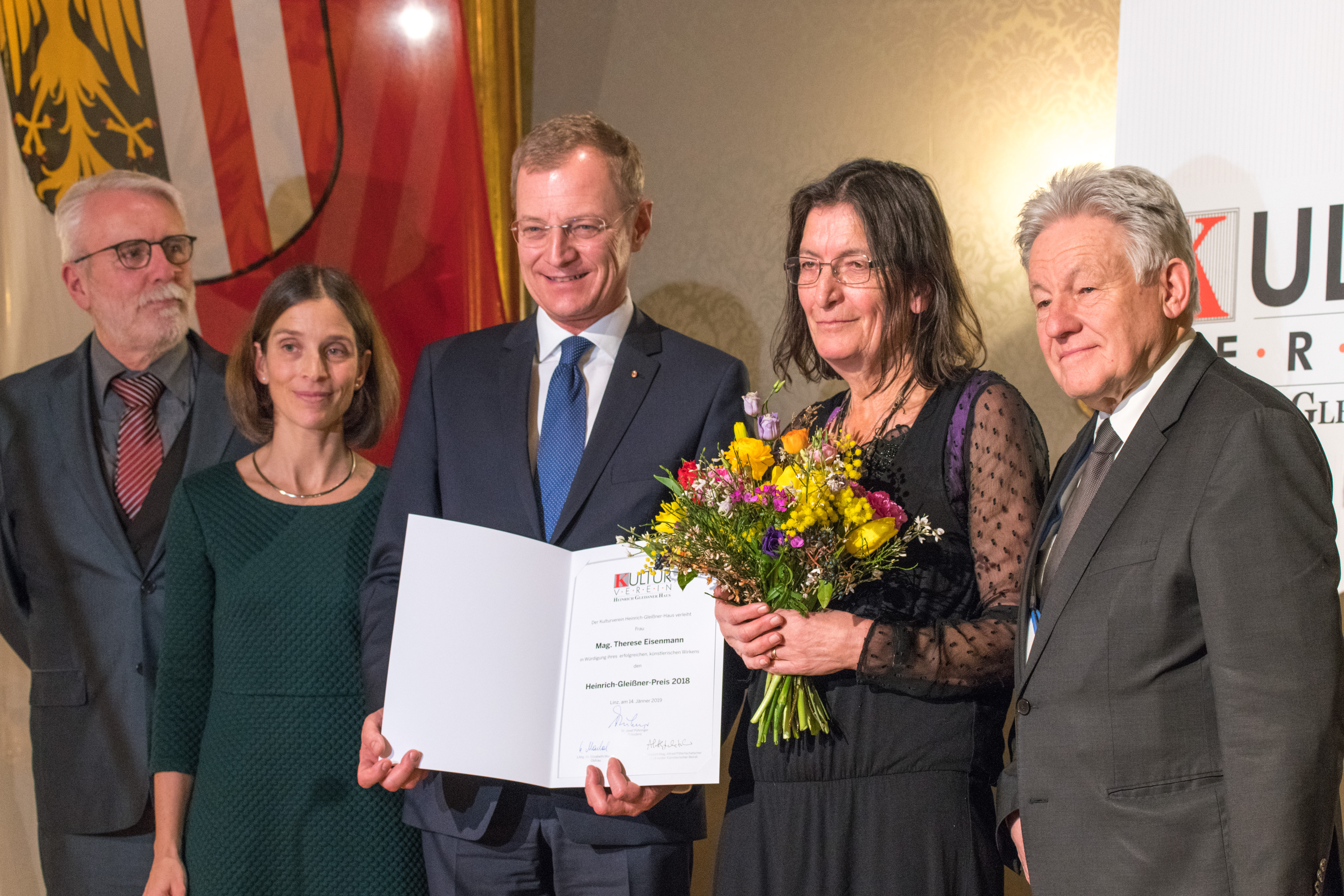
Presentation of the 2018 Heinrich Gleißner Prize to Therese Eisenmann

Year	Main prize	Encouragement prize
1985	Karl Rössing	
1986	Helmut Eder	
1987	Gertrud Fussenegger	
1988	Rudolf Hoflehner	
1989	Thomas Doss	
1990	Fritz Riedl	
1991	Franz Rieger	
1992	Rudolf Kolbitsch	
1993	Balduin Sulzer	
1994	Alois Brandstetter	
1995	Peter Kubovsky	
1996	Architect Roland Ertl	
1997	Fridolin Dallinger	
1998	Erwin Reiter	
1999	Käthe Recheis	
2000	Fritz Fröhlich	
2001	Günter Rombold	
2002	Augustinus Franz Kropfreiter Elisabeth Leitner: Augustinus Franz Kropfreiter: Mit Bruckner unter einem Dach, 10 December 2002.	
2003	Friedrich Zauner	
2004	Franz Riepl	
2005	Marga Persson	
2006	Heinrich Gattermeyer	
2007	Anna Mitgutsch	
2008	Friedrich Achleitner	
2009	Margit Palme	
2010	Franz Josef Altenburg	
2011	Hans Puchhammer	
2012	Ernst Ludwig Leitner	
2013	Andreas Gruber	Felicitas Sonvilla
2014	Maria Moser	Linus Riepler
2015	Margit Schreiner	Matthias Rettenbacher
2016	Michi Gaigg	Nina Pohn
2017	Maximilian Luger and Franz Maul	Sandra Gnigler and Gunar Wilhelm from mia2 Architektur
2018	Therese Eisenmann	Anna Maria Brandstätter
2019	Hans Eichhorn	David Bröderbauer
2020	Inge Dick and Edgar Honetschläger	Sybille Bauer and Gerlinde Miesenböck
