= Maria Temnitschka =

Austrian artist (born 1961)

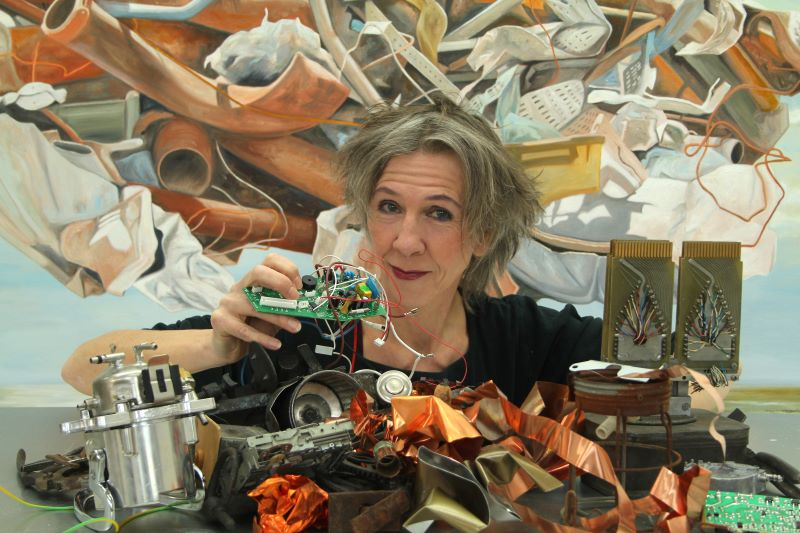
Maria Temnitschka in the studio

Maria Temnitschka (born 1961 in Lower Austria) is an Austrian artist. At the beginning of her artistic career Maria Temnitschka designed and created jewellery and objects made of metal. Later she reoriented to painting - at first abstract, since 2000 figurative representation. Her preferred techniques are oil painting, drawing, experimental photography, object art.

== Life and work ==
From 1980 to 1984, Maria Temnitschka studied metal design under Carl Auböck at the University of Applied Arts Vienna. She later studied painting under Adolf Frohner and Gerhard Müller at the University of Applied Arts in 2002-2006 and graduated in 2006 with distinction.

Since 2009 she has been teaching at the University of Applied Arts.

She is a member of the Künstlerhaus, Association of Austrian Artists, and IG Bildende Kunst.

The theme of decay is a recurring motif in Maria Temnitschka's work. Her preference for industrial, outdated architecture is well known and manifests itself in many images on this subject.

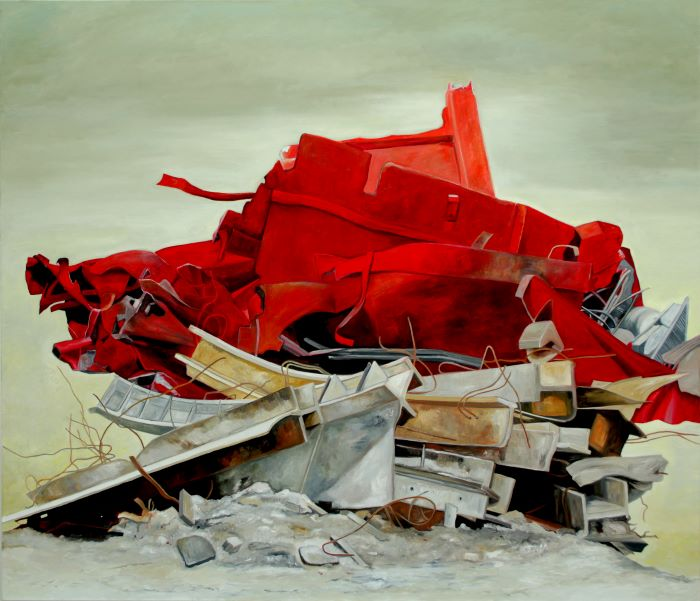
Schrott, 2022, oil on canvas

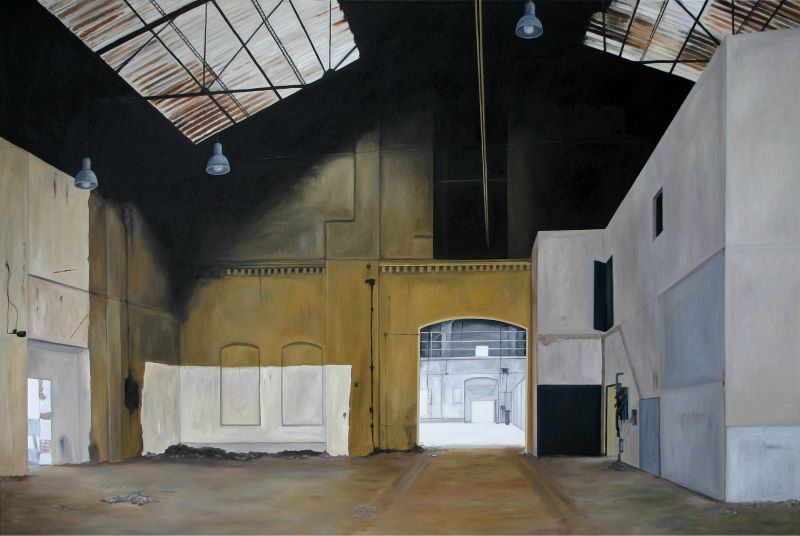
Lost in time, 2010, oil on canvas

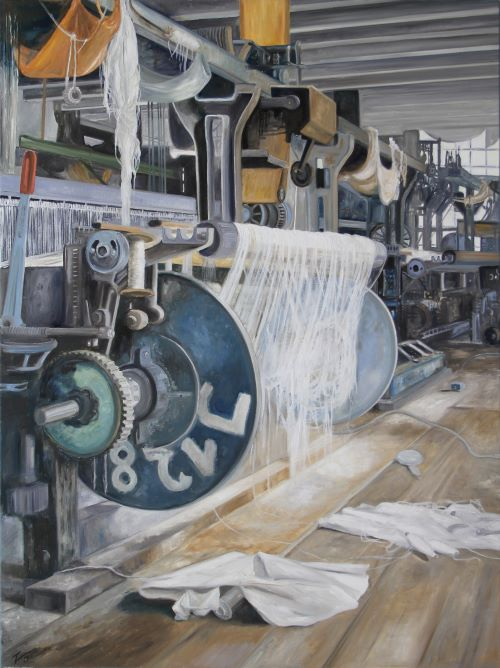
Altes Eisen, 2019, oil on canvas

== Exhibitions (selection) ==
- 2004 FEMINA, Columned Hall of Parliament Vienna
- 2005 The essence, MAK Vienna
- 2005 REAL, Kunsthalle Krems, Lower Austria
- 2005 New Century Artists, Soho, New York
- 2006 Up and Down, Galerie Hrobsky, Vienna
- 2007 Erweiterte Stadtlandschaften, Gallery Pendel, Waidhoven/Ybbs, Lower Austria
- 2008 3 Positionen, NÖ Dokumentationsarchiv, St.Pölten, Lower Austria
- 2009 Unter der Brücke, Gallery Schlesinger, Zurich
- 2009 Ortung, Uni Campus, Danube University Krems
- 2009 Pure Painting, Gallery ArtAffair, Regensburg Germany
- 2010 Unter der Brücke, Gallery Hrobsky, Vienna
- 2010 Contemporary Art Interchange Exhibition, Kurashiki City Art Museum/Japan
- 2011 Lost in time, Artothek Lower Austria Kunstmeile Krems
- 2011 the best works of the biennial of drawing pilsen, Gallery of Slovak Union of Visual Arts, Bratislava
- 2011 k/haus 18, Positionen der Malerei Artemons, Upper Austria
- 2012 Ortung, ÖBV, Vienna
- 2012 Celle - Sarajevo transit, Collegium Artisticum, Sarajevo/BIH
- 2013 KulturpreisträgerInnen 2013, Lower Austria Documentation Archive, St.Pölten
- 2013 Zeichnung, Künstlerhaus, Vienna
- 2013 Transalpin Vis Arte, Zurich
- 2013 lost in time, Gallery Schlesinger, Zurich
- 2014 CELLE: DIE WELT, Künstlerhaus, Vienna
- 2014 Die Würde des Künstlers, Celle-Performance, MUSA Vienna
- 2014 WARWAS Celle-Performance, HGM Vienna
- 2015 TierFREUDen, Exhibition and performance (with K. Seidner and F. Mendelssohn), Sigmund Freud Uni, Berlin
- 2016 on the way, Galerie Nothburga, Innsbruck (together with Silvia Gröbner)
- 2017 lost in thought, Galerie Schafschetzy, Graz
- 2017 der Schein trügt, Budapest Galéria und MAMU Gallery, Budapest
- 2019 IBIDEM Bilder von Büchern, Galerie in der Schmiede, Linz, Pasching (together with Judith Baum)
- 2020 Altes Eisen, Hrobsky Gallery, Vienna
- 2020 Alles war klar, Künstlerhaus, Vienna
- 2022 Schrott, Hrobsky Gallery, Vienna
- 2022 Altes Eisen, blaugelbe Viertelsgalerie, Zwettl, Lower Austria

Trade fair participations: Int. Art Fair Kyiv, "Art Bratislava", "Art Karlsruhe" 2007-2010, Roter Salon (D), "Liste Köln", "Kunst Zürich", Art Austria 2012-2018, Art Vienna.

== Prizes and awards ==
- 1994 Project funding from the BMUK and the Federal Ministry for Foreign Affairs
- 2006 Appreciation Award from the Federal Ministry of Education, Science and Culture
- 2007 Scholarship of the Emanuel and Sofie Fohn Foundation
- 2008 Project funding Art'ist (graduate funding of the University of Applied Arts)
- 2010 State Scholarship for Fine Arts
- 2011 Design of the new Medal of Honour for the Künstlerhaus
- 2013 Project funding for the Cultural Office of the City of Vienna
- 2013 Recognition Award of Lower Austria
- 2022 Schiele Art Award 2nd place

== Collections ==
- Federal Ministry for Education and Art- BM f. Unterricht und Kunst
- Lower Austria State Government
- Austrian Association for Psychotherapy
- Würth Collection
- City Museum Wiener Neustadt, Lower Austria
- Lower Austria State Museum
- Collection of the University of Applied Arts
- Danube University Krems, Lower Austria
- City of Vienna
- National Bank of Austria - Oesterreichische Nationalbank
- Cocca Collection
- Österreichische Beamtenversicherung
- Federal Chancellery Austria - Bundeskanzleramt Österreich
- Artothek Niederösterreich
