= Gertrud Fussenegger =

Austrian Painter

- Born: Gertrud Anna Fussenegger; 8 May 1912; Pilsen, Bohemia, Austro-Hungarian empire
- Died: 19 March 2009 (aged 96); Linz, Upper Austria, Austria
- Occupation: Writer-novelist
- Spouse(s): 1. Elmar Dietz; 2. Alois Dorn
- Children: Traudi; Ricarda; Dorothea; Raimund; Lukas
- Parent(s): Emil Fussenegger; Karoline Hässler

Gertrud Fussenegger (8 May 1912 – 19 March 2009) was an Austrian writer and a prolific author, especially of historical novels. Many commentators felt that her reputation never entirely escaped from the shadow cast by her enthusiasm, as a young woman, for National Socialism.

== Life ==
=== Provenance and early years ===
Gertrud Anna Fussenegger was born in Pilsen, a flourishing manufacturing city in Bohemia which at that time was a Crown land of the Austrian Empire. She came from a military family. Emil Fussenegger, her father, was an Imperial and Royal army officer originally from Vorarlberg. Her mother, born Karoline Hässler, was from Bohemia. She grew up in Neu Sandez (then in Galicia), Dornbirn (Vorarlberg) and Telfs (North Tirol). She enrolled at the Mädchen-Realgymnasium (girls' secondary school) in Innsbruck in 1923. After her mother died in 1926, she moved back to Pilsen – by now part of Czechoslovakia – where she lived with her grandparents. It was at the "Reform-Realgymnasium" (school) in Pilsen that Fussenegger completed her schooling, passing her Matura (school final exams) in 1930. She later confided in her diaries that she sometimes felt a little regretful, listening uncomprehendingly to the chattering of her grandparents' Bohemian-born domestic servants, that having lived almost all of her first fourteen years in other parts of Austria, she had not more effectively mastered the Czech language.

She went on to study history, art history and philosophy at the University of Innsbruck (7 terms) and the Ludwig-Maximilians-Universität München (1 term). It was from the University of Innsbruck that in 1934 she received her doctorate. Her dissertation concerned the Roman de la Rose by Jean de Meun ("Gemeinschaft und Gemeinschaftsbildung im Rosenroman von Jean Clopinel von Meun").

=== Politics ===
Fussenegger joined the Austrian National Socialist party – still at this stage formally separate from its German counterpart – in May 1933. Membership was still illegal in Austria. In May 1934, she participated in a demonstration in Innsbruck at which, it was reported, she had joined in singing of the Horst-Wessel song and gave a Hitler salute. She was charged, convicted and fined. According to one source she was also banned from further study at any Austrian university. In February 1935 she was still a member of another Austrian National Socialist student group, but later that year, in or before November, she relocated to Germany. In March 1938, following an invasion from the north that met with little practical resistance, Austria was incorporated into an enlarged German state, albeit under very different circumstances from those that most nineteenth century proponents of such a "solution" would have anticipated. Gertrud Fussenegger, who by now was probably living in Munich, "rejoined" the ruling National Socialist party: her membership number was 6,229,747, which is consistent with her having joined the party in 1938. For the avoidance of doubt, she also wrote a "hymn" eulogising Adolf Hitler. In 1938 the first newspaper to publish her poem "Stimme der Ostmark" ("Voice of the Ostmark") was the Völkischer Beobachter ("Popular Observer"), the mass-circulation daily newspaper of the NSDAP.

=== Family ===
In 1935, Fussenegger married the Bavarian sculptor Elmar Dietz. By the time it ended in divorce twelve years later the marriage had produced four recorded children, including the artist Ricarda Dietz. The marriage was not happy. In 1943 she left Munich and settled at Hall in Tirol where she lived with her four children as a single parent.

Her second marriage was to another sculptor. In 1950, Gertrud Fussenegger married Alois Dorn. This marriage resulted in the birth of her second son and fifth child. Divorce at this time was unusual, especially for a committed member of the Roman Catholic Church. Fussenegger's own insights, reported by a Catholic newspaper, are instructive:

"Since my second marriage was simply a civil one, for a long time I was not permitted to receive the sacraments. I found that deeply painful, but the pain also became very productive for me. It was the only way I could come to a recognition of the full preciousness of the Eucharist. I therefore cannot regret the bitter tears I often shed at that time. That ban was actually a gift."
"Da meine zweite Ehe nur standesamtlich geschlossen war, war ich sehr lange von den Sakramenten ausgeschlossen. Das habe ich als tief schmerzlich empfunden, doch es war ein Schmerz, der auch sehr fruchtbar für mich geworden ist. Nur so ist mir die ganze Kostbarkeit der Eucharistie bewusst geworden. Ich kann es nicht bedauern, dass ich in jener Zeit oft bittere Tränen vergossen habe. Genau genommen war ich beschenkt durch das Verbot."

In 1961, she relocated with her family, settling this time in Leonding, a small town near Linz.

== Memberships and recognition ==
Gertrud Fussenegger was a member of the Austrian P.E.N. association, of the Humboldt Society, of the Sudeten German Academy and an honorary member of the Austrian Writers' Association. Between 1977 and 1979, and again from 1984 until 1985, she was a jury member for the Ingeborg Bachmann Prize, awarded each year in Klagenfurt. In 1991 she was a jury member for the Franz-Grillparzer Prize of the Alfred Toepfer foundation. In 1978 she was honoured with an award from the Humboldt Society.

Gertrude Gussenegger's literary archive is held by the Upper Austria Literature Archive at the Stifterhaus in Linz.

== Artistic output ==
Fussnegger began her writing career with historical novels, set in various different epochs. Her stories were influenced by her Catholic provenance. She was conscious of her reliance on the "renouveau catholique" movement which had originated in France but during the twentieth century became more of an international phenomenon. That reliance is particularly pronounced in her novel "Zeit des Raben, Zeit der Taube" (1960: "Time of the raven: time of the dove").

Gertrud Fassenegger authored more than sixty books, alongside various shorter prose pieces and poems, published, according to at least one source, by 25 publishers and translated into eleven languages.

=== Fussenegger and the Third Reich ===
Fussenegger's relationship with National Socialism did much to define both her early writing career and a degree of controversy around her person which never completely went away. She joined the NSDAP in Austria in 1933 and rejoined it in Germany after the Anschluss in 1938. In 1939 she became a member of the government-created Reich Chamber of Literature. She took part on the Weimar Poets' Congress in 1938 and again in 1939, and was in touch with well-known "völkisch" authors such as Ina Seidel, Lulu von Strauß und Torney, Will Vesper and Wilhelm Pleyer. And yet, despite her commitment to the regime, literary objections to her work came out of the "Office for the Care of New Literature" ("Amt Schrifttumspflege") which operated under the direction of Hans Hagemeyer and, less directly, of the influential party ideologue Alfred Rosenberg. Two years after its publication one of her first books, "Mohrenlegende" (1937: loosely "Legends of the dark skinned ones") was (belatedly) banned by the party experts who now identified it as criticism of official race ideology and "Catholic dross" ("katholisches Machwerk"). Controversy about this particular work resurfaced in 1993 in connection with proposals to award Fussenegger the Weilheim Literature Prize and the Jean-Paul Prize awarded by "The Free State of Bavaria".

Many of Fussenegger's other pieces, mostly during this period religiously contextualised novels, poems and reviews, found their way into important party newspapers and journals. Most (in)famously, her poem "Stimme der Ostmark" ("Voice of the Ostmark") was printed in 1938 by the Völkischer Beobachter. The poem attracted huge criticism after 1945, because it celebrated the "peaceful annexation of Austria into Nazi Germany" and it eulogised Hitler. Around fifty years later Gertrud Fussenegger's comment on the affair was capable of various interpretations, but it fell short of an unambiguous recantation. She regretted having "wasted so much thinking time on something so loathsome" ("viele gute Gedanken verschwendet ... auf eine Sache, die dann ein Greuel war").

Fussnegger's attitude during the National Socialist period remains controversial. Between 1937 and 1941 27 of her contributions appeared in the Völkischer Beobachter. Other publications with similar political slants that published her work included "Wille und Macht" and "Das Reich". In her more political moments she identified Adolf Hitler as a healing figure.

=== After 1945 ===
After 1945 the Anschluss was undone. The western two-thirds of Germany and the pre-1938 territory of Austria were both divided into military occupation zones, with Berlin and Vienna sub-divided between armies of the same four occupying powers. In Germany's Soviet occupation zone two of Fussenegger's novels, "Der Brautraub" ("The Bride Robbery": 1939) und "Böhmische Verzauberungen" ("Bohemian Enchantments": 1944) were included in the official four volume "List of Discarded Literature". In Vienna, too, several of her works were placed on the "List of banned authors and books".

The postwar decades were productive ones for Gertrud Fussenegger as a novelist. Yet as late as 1952 she published a brief self-portrait in a literary journal which contained phrases chillingly redolent of National Socialist race ideology. She belonged to a race characterised by "fair skin, bright [blue] eyes, sensitive to bright light, a hybrid of nordic and dinaric features" ("... hellhäutig, helläugig, empfindlich gegen die Wirkung des Lichts, ein Mischtyp aus nordischen und dinarischen Zügen").

During the postwar period Fussenegger repeatedly wrestled with the "German guilt" question. One literary critic, Klaus Amann, described her 1979 autobiography "Ein Spiegelbild mit Feuersäule" (loosely, "mirror image with pillars of fire") as "overall a cringe-worthy offering of suppression and obduracy" ("...insgesamt ein peinliches Dokument der Verdrängung und der Verstocktheit"). Other less hostile commentators saw this autobiographical work as a kind of literary penance. During the Hitler years she had included in a 1943 travel report a powerfully horrific description of a Jewish cemetery she had visited in Prague. In it she had employed National Socialist antisemitic shibboleths and stereo-types to condemn the city's Jewish community for the dire condition of the place. In her 1979 autobiographical work she reproduced that description of the Jewish cemetery in Prague three and a half decades earlier, but she had "cleaned it up". She still reported "overflowing tombs", but removed references to Jewish differentness and degeneracy. The overall tone of the text was completely transformed.

== Awards and honours ==
- 1942 First Prize in "The twentieth century novella" competition
- 1951 Adalbert-Stifter prize
- 1956 Sponsorship award from the Oldenburgisches Staatstheater
- 1962 National East German writing prize
- 1958 Nordgau-Kulturpreis der Stadt Amberg ("Poetry" category)
- 1963 Adalbert-Stifter prize
- 1969 Johann-Peter-Hebel Prize
- 1972 Andreas-Gryphius-Preis
- 1972 Hauptpreis des Sudetendeutschen Kulturbundes
- 1972 Main Arts Prize of the Sudetendeutschen Landsmannschaft
- 1972 Verleihung des Professorentitels h. c.
- 1979 Mozart-Preis der Alfred Toepfer Stiftung F.V.S.
- 1979 Humboldt-Plakette
- 1981 Österreichisches Ehrenzeichen für Wissenschaft und Kunst
- 1983 Konrad-Adenauer-Preis der Deutschland-Stiftung (which she turned down)
- 1984 Order of Merit of the Federal Republic of Germany 1st class
- 1987 Heinrich Gleißner Prize
- 1992 DANUBIUS Donauland non-fiction prize
- 1993 Weilheim Literature Prize
- 1993 Jean-Paul-Preis
- 1999 Arts Medal of Upper Austria
- 2002 Grand Decoration of Honour in Gold with Star for Services to the Republic of Austria
- 2004 Decoration of Honour for the Tirol
- 2007 Pontifical Equestrian Order of Saint Sylvester Pope and Martyr from Pope Benedict XVI
- 2007 Egerländer Kulturpreis Johannes-von-Tepl, Arbeitskreis Egerländer Kulturschaffender

== Output (selection) ==
- … wie gleichst du dem Wasser. Novellas. Munich 1929
- Geschlecht im Advent. Roman aus deutscher Frühzeit. Potsdam 1936
- Mohrenlegende. Potsdam 1937
- Der Brautraub. Erzählungen. Potsdam 1939
- Die Leute auf Falbeson. Jena 1940
- Eggebrecht. Erzählungen. Jena 1943
- Böhmische Verzauberungen. Jena 1944
- Die Brüder von Lasawa. Novel. Salzburg 1948
- Das Haus der dunklen Krüge. Novel. Salzburg 1951
- In Deine Hand gegeben. Novel. Düsseldorf/Köln 1954
- Das verschüttete Antlitz. Novel. Stuttgart 1957
- Zeit des Raben, Zeit der Taube. Novel. Stuttgart 1960
- Der Tabakgarten, 6 Geschichten und ein Motto. Stuttgart 1961
- Die Reise nach Amalfi. Radio play. Stuttgart 1963
- Die Pulvermühle. Detective novel. Stuttgart 1968
- Bibelgeschichten. Vienna/Heidelberg 1972
- Widerstand gegen Wetterhähne. Lyrische Kürzel und andere Texte. Stuttgart 1974
- Eines langen Stromes Reise – Die Donau. Linie, Räume, Knotenpunkte. Stuttgart 1976
- Ein Spiegelbild mit Feuersäule. Ein Lebensbericht. Autobiographie. Stuttgart 1979
- Pilatus. Szenenfolge um den Prozess Jesu. Uraufgeführt 1979, verlegt Freiburg i. B./Heidelberg 1982
- Maria Theresia. Vienna/Munich/Zürich/Innsbruck 1980
- Kaiser, König, Kellerhals. Heitere Erzählungen. Vienna/Munich/Zürich/New York 1981
- Sie waren Zeitgenossen. Roman. Stuttgart 1983
- Uns hebt die Welle. Liebe, Sex und Literatur. Essay. Vienna/ Freiburg i. B./Basel 1984
- Gegenruf. Poems. Salzburg 1986
- Jona. for young people. Vienna/Munich 1987
- Herrscherinnen. Frauen, die Geschichte machten. Stuttgart 1991
- Jirschi oder die Flucht ins Pianino. Graz/ Vienna/ Cologne 1995
- Ein Spiel ums andere. Erzählungen. Stuttgart 1996
- Shakespeares Töchter. Three novellas. Munich 1999
- Bourdanins Kinder. Novel. Munich 2001
- Gertrud Fussenegger. Ein Gespräch über ihr Leben und Werk mit Rainer Hackel. Vienna/ Cologne/ Weimar 2005
