= Emil Pirchan =

Austrian stage designer (1884–1957)

Emil Pirchan (27 May 1884 in Brno – 20 December 1957 in Vienna) was an Austrian stage designer and set decorator. He served as director of stage design for the Bavarian State Opera, the Berlin State Opera, the State Opera in Prague, the Burgtheater, and the Vienna State Opera. The son of Emil Pirchan the Elder, he was a part of the Vienna Secession art movement and trained under Otto Wagner at the Academy of Fine Arts Vienna, and later lectured at the Berlin University of the Arts. He was buried at the Hietzing Cemetery, and his life and works have been exhibited at the Museum Folkwang and the Leopold Museum.
