= Šebrov-Kateřina =

- Municipality
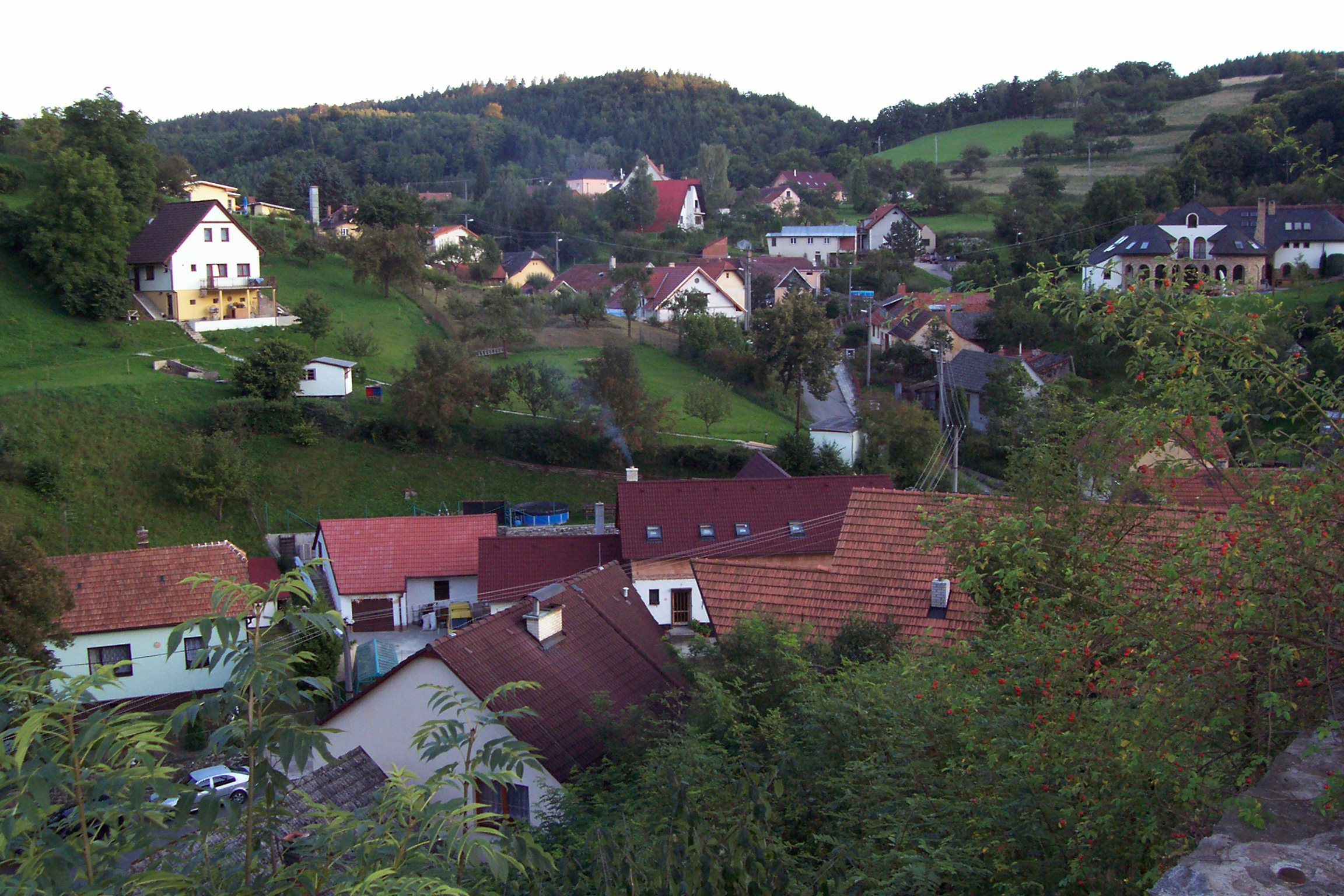
- Village of Svatá Kateřina

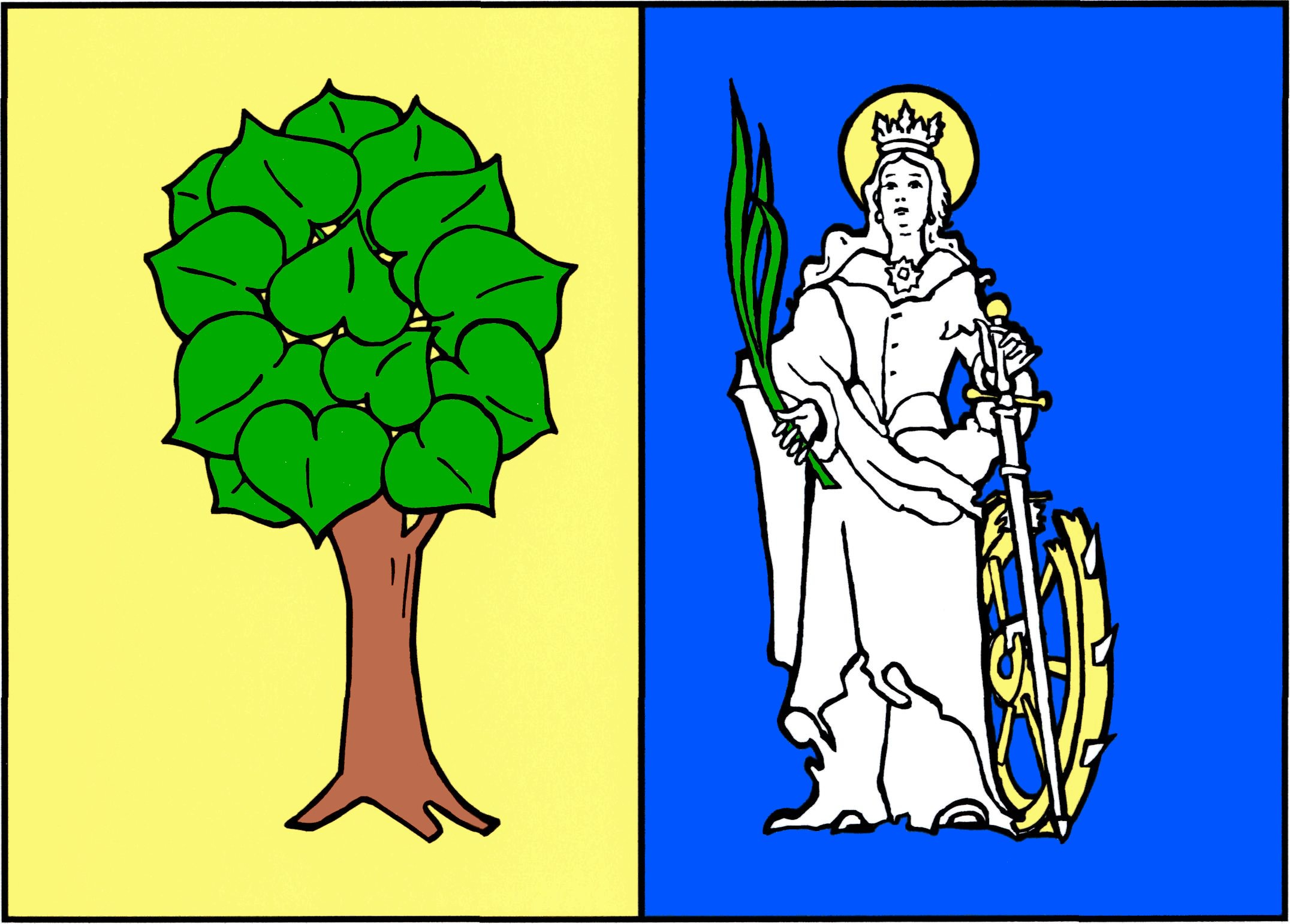
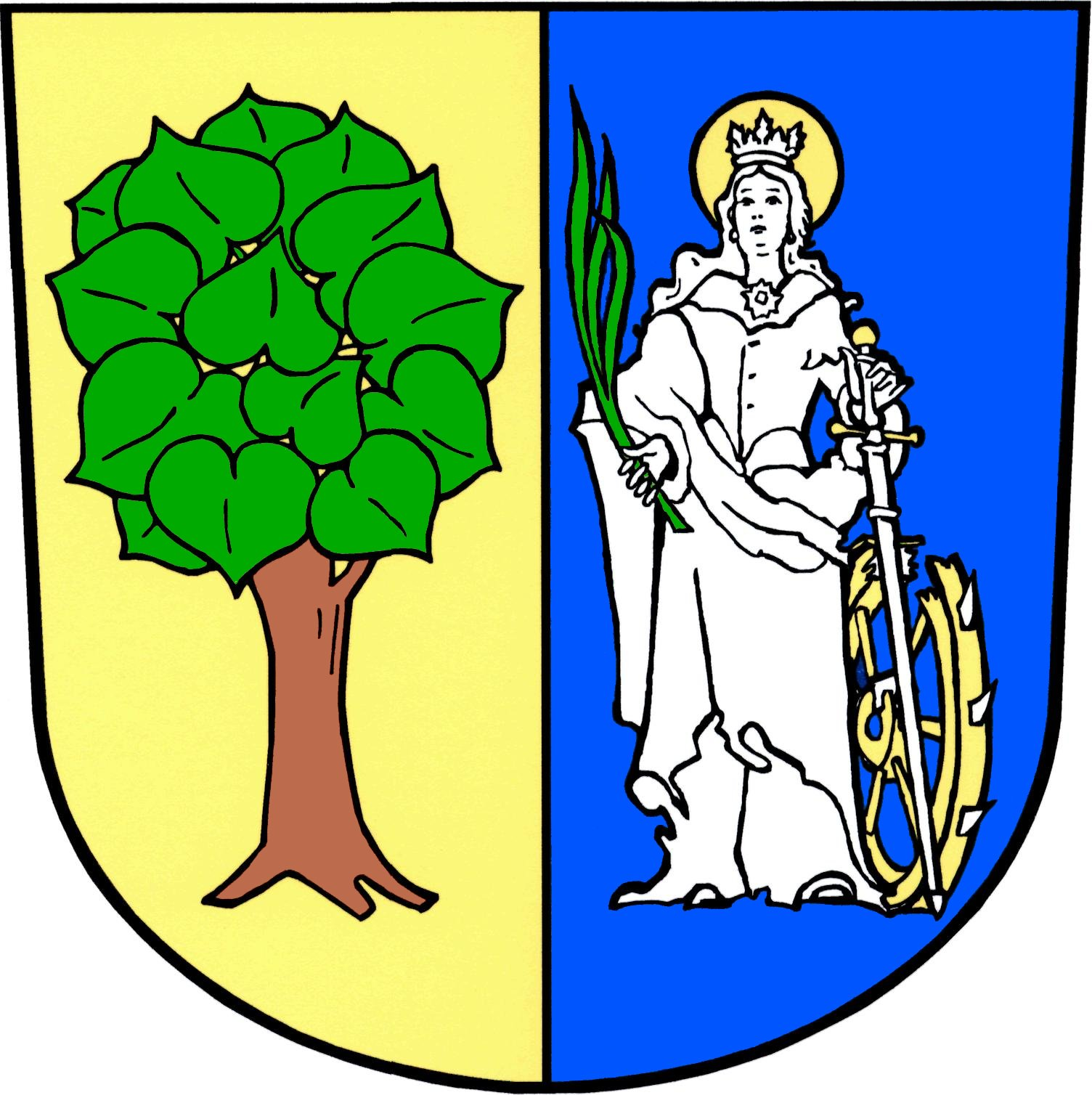
- Flag Coat of arms

- Location in the Czech Republic
- Coordinates: 49°20′25″N 16°33′11″E
- Country: Czech Republic
- Region: South Moravian
- District: Blansko
- First mentioned: 1378

Area
  - Total: 10.29 km^{2} (3.97 sq mi)
- Elevation: 338 m (1,109 ft)

Population (2026-01-01)
  - Total: 817
  - Density: 79.4/km^{2} (206/sq mi)
- Time zone: UTC+1 (CET)
  - Summer (DST): UTC+2 (CEST)
- Postal code: 679 22
- Website: www.sebrov-katerina.cz

Šebrov-Kateřina is a municipality in Blansko District in the South Moravian Region of the Czech Republic. It has about 800 inhabitants.

Šebrov-Kateřina lies approximately 5 kilometres (3 mi) south-west of Blansko, 15 km (9 mi) north of Brno, and 179 km (111 mi) south-east of Prague.

== Administrative division ==
Šebrov-Kateřina consists of two municipal parts (in brackets population according to the 2021 census):

- Šebrov (615)
- Svatá Kateřina (207)

== Demographics ==
Historical population
Year	Pop.	±%
1869	656	—
1880	770	+17.4%
1890	799	+3.8%
1900	874	+9.4%
1910	906	+3.7%
1921	967	+6.7%
1930	999	+3.3%
1950	877	−12.2%
1961	822	−6.3%
1970	793	−3.5%
1980	708	−10.7%
1991	591	−16.5%
2001	620	+4.9%
2011	772	+24.5%
2021	822	+6.5%
Source: Censuses
