= Markus Hofer (sculptor) =

Austrian sculptor

Markus Hofer (born 1977) is an Austrian sculptor. He is known for his creation sculptures which place everyday objects in unusual context.

== Early life and education ==
Hofer was born in Haslach, Upper Austria in 1977. He attended the University of Arts and Industrial Design Linz and the Berlin Weissensee School of Art. Markus Hofer graduated from the Academy of Fine Arts Vienna where he studied under Bruno Gironcoli.

== Career ==
In 2008 Hofer worked as an assistant to artist Erwin Wurm. Markus Hofer was invited by the Albertina, Vienna, to mount a series of exhibitions called Intervention. His artwork has also been displayed at the Belvedere, Vienna, the Kunsthalle Krems, and the Würth Museum in Germany, among other institutions.

In 2016, Hofer traveled to Western Australia, where his work was displayed at the Gomboc Gallery in Middle Swan, and where he participated in the annual Sculpture by the Sea exhibit at Perth, creating a piece entitled "Liquid Australia". In 2017 an installation which included a 15-ton excavator was included in Art Austria in Liechtenstein.

== Exhibitions (selection) ==
- 2004 – Die Macht der Farbe, Theseus Tempel, Vienna, Austria
- 2005 – Betonsalon, Museumsquatier, Vienna, Austria; Chilenische Eier, Space, Kforum Vienna, Vienna, Austria (solo exhibition)
- 2006 – site effects, Schloss Hollenburg, Lower Austria, Austria
- 2007 – Kunstzelle, WUK, Vienna, Austria; Sceneshift, Passagegalerie, Künstlerhaus Wien, Vienna, Austria (solo exhibition)
- 2008 – May I Have Your History, Artist Quarterly, Sotheby's Wien, Vienna, Austria (solo exhibition); Space Invasion, Österreichisches Museum für Volkskunde Wien, Vienna, Austria (solo exhibition)
- 2009 – Time Zone, Haus Frey, Graz, Austria (solo exhibition); Wasser/Leben, Landesausstellung Kärnten, Stift Millstatt, Carinthia, Austria; Flavors of Austria, The Art Foundation, Athens, Greece;- The Beauty of the Mistake, LX factory, Lisbon, Portugal
- 2010 – Tracing Abstract, Dokumentationszentrum für moderne Kunst, St. Pölten, Austria
- 2011 – Interventionen in Graz, Orpheum Graz, Austria (solo exhibition); Skulpturale 2011, Konstanz, Germany; Ronchini Arte Contemporanea, Terni, Italy (solo show); Small Format, LKFF Art&Skulpture Projects, Brussels, Belgium
- 2012 – Intervention(1), Albertina, Vienna, Austria (solo exhibition); Wunder, Kunsthalle Krems, Austria<; Painted Interventions, Österreichisches Kulturinstitut, Washington, USA; Le tour de la Réalité, LKFF Art&Sculpture Projects, Brussels, Belgium (solo exhibition); Fiera Internazionale di Arte Contemporanea 2012, Bologna, Italy; Museum Humanum, Fratres, Austria; Objected Tables, Hofmobilien Depot Wien, Vienna, Austria
- 2013 – A.E.I.O.U. Österreichische Aspekte in der Sammlung Würth, Museum Würth, Künzelsau, Germany; Emerge Art Fair, Washington, USA
- 2014 – Das endlose Zimmer, Mario Mauroner Contemporary Art Salzburg-Vienna, Austria (solo exhibition); Die andere Seite, Spiegel und Spiegelungen in der zeitgenössischen Kunst, Österreichische Galerie Belvedere, Vienna, Austria; Hier steht ein Sessel, Galerie im Traklhaus, Salzburg, Austria' Art Paris, Mario Mauroner Contemporary Art Salzburg-Vienna, Paris, France; Art Brussels, Mario Mauroner Contemporary Art Salzburg-Vienna, Brussels, Belgium.
