= Kunstforum Salzkammergut =

Austrian art association

The Kunstforum Salzkammergut is an Austrian art association in the Salzkammergut region, based in Gmunden, whose members deal with various art forms. Originally founded in 1928, the Salzkammergut Artists' Guild changed its name to Kunstforum Salzkammergut in 2008. The association runs its own gallery in Gmunden and organises exhibitions, cooperations with other institutions, publications, readings, concerts and other events for the associated artists, in particular also in the Kammerhofgalerie in the Kammerhofmuseum in Gmunden. The artists' association repeatedly participates in the Linz Art Fair.

== Direction ==
The new leadership elected in 2014 is a team consisting of Ferdinand Reisenbichler, Ottilie Großmayer and Heidi Zednik as well as the advisory board members Paul Jaeg and Konrad Wallinger.

== Publications ==
- 50 Jahre Künstlergilde Salzkammergut. 2 parts. Gmunden 1978, DNB-IDN 830887598.
- Hedwig Schraml: Die Keramik, Ausstellung in der Kammerhofgalerie 2008 anlässlich des 80jährigen Bestehens der Künstlergilde Salzkammergut (1928 bis 2008) im Rahmen der Oberösterreichischen Landesausstellung, Salzkammergut. Bibliothek der Provinz, Weitra 2008, ISBN 978-3-85252-885-4.
- Kunst im Salzkammergut. Mehrteiliges Werk (Alte Meister, Geometrie +Konzept, Der Traunseher und die Bildmanufaktur Traunsee, Die Keramik, Landschaftsbilder - Bildlandschaften). 2008–2009.
