= Markus Hofer (politician) =

Austrian politician (born 1971)

Member of the National Council
- Incumbent
- Assumed office 24 October 2024
- Constituency: Upper Austria

Personal details
- Born: 26 September 1971 (age 54)
- Party: NEOS

Markus Hofer (born 26 September 1971) is an Austrian politician of NEOS serving as a member of the National Council since 2024. Since 2021, he has served as deputy spokesperson of UNOS.
