= University of Art and Design Linz =

University in Linz, Austria

Coordinates: 48.3066°N 14.2857°E

- Universität für künstlerische und industrielle Gestaltung Linz
- Other names: University of Art and Industrial Design in Linz; University of Arts Linz
- Former name: Kunstschule
- Established: 1947; 79 years ago
- Vice-Chancellor: Brigitte Hütter
- Location: Linz, Upper Austria, Austria
- Website: https://www.ufg.ac.at

The University of Art and Design Linz is one of four universities in Linz, Upper Austria.

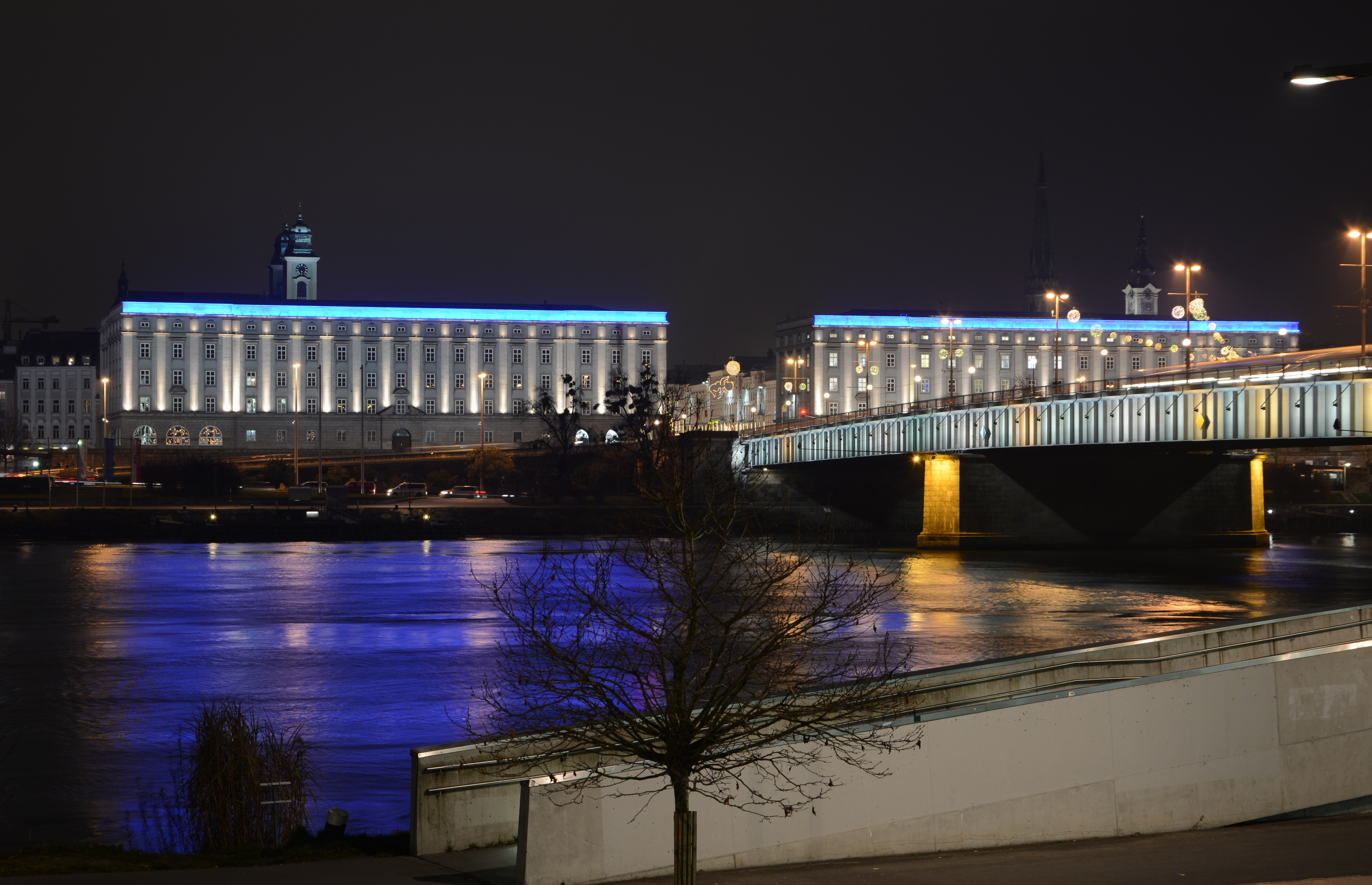
University of Art and Design Linz

No consensus has yet been reached on the university's name in English. The Legal Information System of the Republic of Austria calls it the University of Art and Design Linz in an English translation of the current version of the Austrian Universities Act 2002. The Austrian Ministry of Education, Science and Research calls it the University of Art and Industrial Design in Linz, and the university calls itself the University of Arts Linz.

The University of Art and Design Linz has its institutional and programmatic roots in the “Kunstschule” (Art School) of the City of Linz, which was founded in 1947, assigned academy status in 1973 and finally made a fully-fledged university in 1998. The institution was conceived as an explicit statement to signify dissociation from the previous art policy of the National Socialist era. This is in particular exemplified by its emphasis on the fundamental values of freedom of art and research, its commitment to modernism and contemporary art and the positioning of the University at the interface of free-artistic and applied-economically oriented design. In the past as in the present, these values form the basis of the fundamental essence and identity of the Kunstuniversität Linz. Since 1 January 2004, the university is constituted as a “corporation under public law” according to the new Universities Organisation Act of 2002 and hence enjoys far-reaching autonomy. In the context of the regional and international frame conditions within which Kunstuniversität Linz operates, three main orientations were evolved over the past few years. Going beyond specialist competencies per se, they are of particular importance for artistic development, research and teaching and moreover reflect the unique profile of the university.

== History ==
=== 1947 ===
The University of Art and Design Linz is the successor to the Art School (“Kunstschule”) of the City of Linz, established in 1947. Originally, the School is assigned premises in the western bridgehead building at Hauptplatz 8. In later years, branch facilities are set up in Bischofstraße and Prunerstraße. The institution operates two master schools of painting, headed by Herbert Dimmel and Karl Hauk, who also serves as director of the Art School until 1949, as well as one master school of graphic art, headed by Alfons Ortner. In 1948 and 1951, respectively, a master school of sculpture, headed by Walter Ritter, and a master school of typography and applied graphic design, headed by Friedrich Neugebauer, follow suit.

=== 1959/60 ===
Alfons Ortner is appointed director. His goal is to bring the Art School closer to becoming an academy of applied art.

=== 1961/62 ===
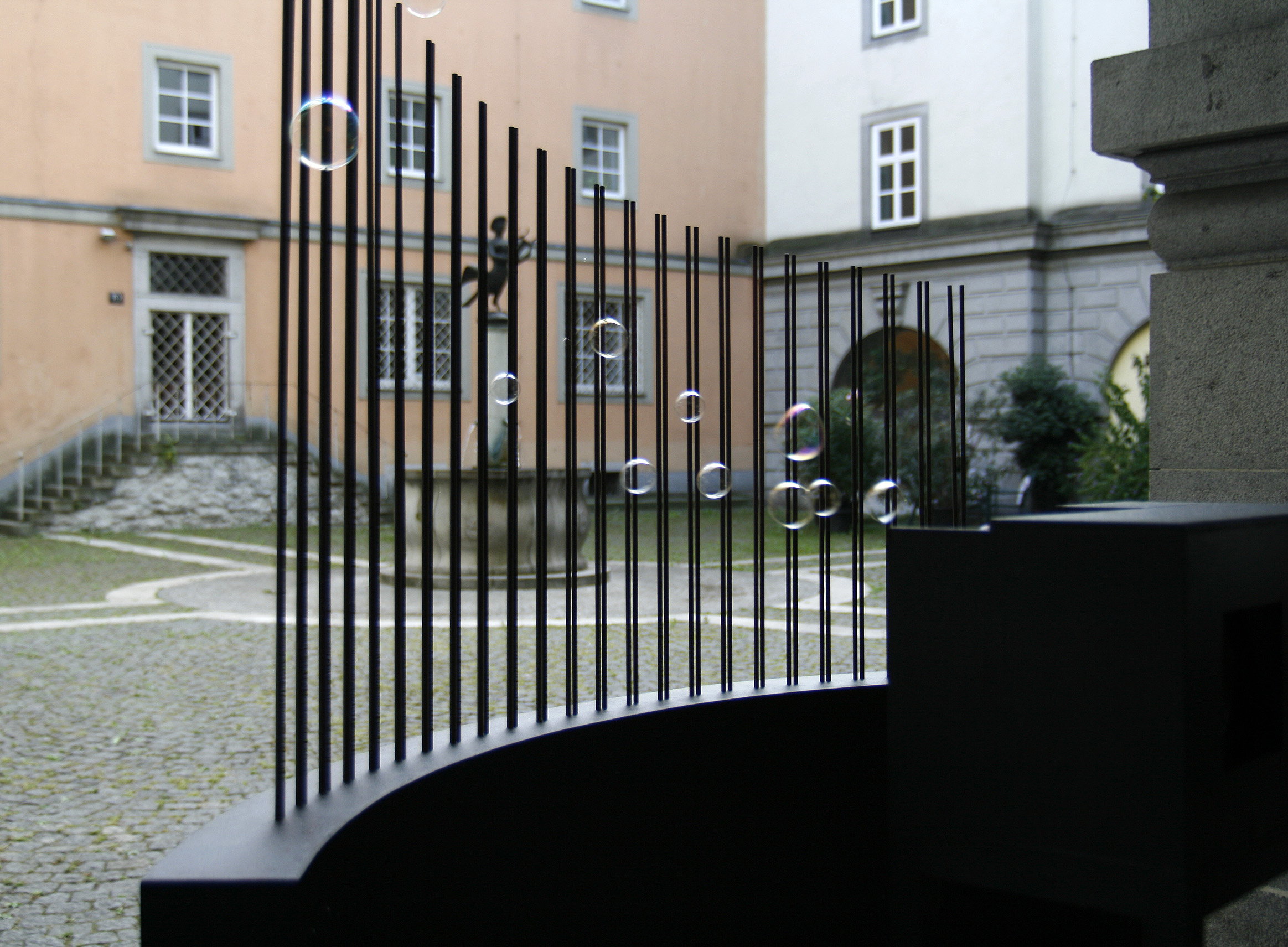
University of Art and Design Linz

In 1961, the Art School of the City of Linz is awarded full public-law status by the Federal Ministry of Education; the statute of the school and the curricular, scholastic and examination regulations are revised; the “master schools” are now called “master classes”. The following new master classes are introduced: Advertising Art, head: Erich Buchegger Basic Course, head: Roxane Cuvay

=== 1973 ===
The Federal Act of 9 May 1973, Federal Gazette No. 251/1973, transforms the institution into the “Academy of Art and Industrial Design in Linz” (Hochschule für künstlerische und industrielle Gestaltung in Linz). Alfons Ortner is voted founding rector.

At this time, the institution offered the following master classes:

- Painting and Graphic Art, Alfons Ortner
- Advertising Art, Erich Buchegger
- Typography and Book Design, Friedrich Neugebauer
- Interior Design, Friedrich Goffitzer
- Industrial Design, Horst C. H. Meru
- Ceramics, Günter Praschak
- Three-dimensional Design – Metal, Helmuth Gsöllpointner
- Three-dimensional Design – Sculpture, Erwin Reiter
- Basic Course, Roxane Cuvay (interim)

and the following chairs:

- Environment Design, Günther Feuerstein
- Art Education, Hannes Haybäck

=== 1975 and 1976 ===
Endowment of a chair for handicraft education and appointment of Helmut Huber as its head and endowment of a chair for textile design and appointment of Fritz Riedl as its head.

=== 1977 to 1980 ===
In autumn 1977, the "Fund of the Academy of Design of Linz” organises the exhibition “Forum Metall Linz” (concept developers, organisers and artistic directors: Helmuth Gsöllpointner and Peter Baum). In summer 1980, the Fund co-operates with the New Gallery of the City of Linz and others in organising the exhibition “Forum Design – Design formt den Alltag” (concept by Helmuth Gsöllpointner, Angela Hareiter, Laurids Ortner and Peter Baum).

=== 1984 to 1990 ===
The construction of a new building for the institution is initiated and the former Ringbrot factory in Urfahr, Sonnensteinstraße/Reindlstraße is converted to university use. The chair for handicraft education and the master classes for sculpture, visual design and ceramics move into the converted building in 1986. In 1990, the master classes for painting and graphic art, visual media design, metal, textile design, the chair for environment design, the central media workshop, the printing shop, the silkscreen workshop, the chapter of the Austrian National Union of Students and parts of the administration move into the new building in Urfahr.

=== 1995 to 1997 ===
The former pipe tobacco factory (Peter Behrens Building) on Untere Donaulände (built between 1929 and 1935 by Peter Behrens and Alexander Popp) is rented. The master classes for sculpture and experimental visual design move from Urfahr to the Peter Behrens Building.

=== 1998 to 2000 ===
On 1 October 1998, the new Federal Universities of the Arts Organisation Act (KUOG) enters into force. As per this day, the institution becomes the "University of Art and Design Linz". As per 27 September 2000, all bodies of Kunstuniversität Linz are elected according to the provisions of KUOG 1998, and as per 28 September 2000, the institution is wholly subject to KUOG 1998.

On 5 April 2000, Reinhard Kannonier is elected the first rector under the provisions of KUOG 1998.

=== 2002 to 2003 ===
Foundation of the Forum – Friends and Alumni of Kunstuniversität Linz; setting-up of the international research laboratory Design-Organisation-Media (DOM); (head: Michael Shamiyeh).

Reinhard Kannonier is re-elected rector for another four-year term of office. Acting upon a proposal by Kannonier, the University Council chooses three Vice-Rectors. The size of the Senate of Kunstuniversität Linz is set at 12 members by the founding assembly.

=== 2004 ===
Since 1 January 2004, the university has been operating as a “corporation under public law” according to the new Universities Organisation Act of 2002 and hence is largely autonomous.

What has remained a constant for the many decades since its inception are several core competencies of Kunstuniversität Linz: free artistic and applied design, interdisciplinarity, teaching at a very high level. In recent years, the profile of the university has been largely determined by the three focuses on intermediality, spatial strategies and artistic-scientific research.

== Directors/Rectors ==
- Directors of Kunstschule der Stadt Linz (Art School of the City of Linz)
- Karl Hauk – Director from 1947 to 1949
- Herbert Dimmel – Director from 1949 to 1959
- Alfons Ortner – Director as of 1959

== Vice Chancellors ==
- Alfons Ortner, Founding rector of the Academy of Art and Industrial Design in Linz, 1973 to September 1977
- Helmuth Gsöllpointner, vice-chancellor in the academic years 1977/78 to 1980/81
- Hannes Haybäck, vice-chancellor in the academic years 1981/82 to 1984/85 and 1985/86 to 1988/89
- Friedrich Goffitzer, vice-chancellor in the academic years 1989/90 to September 1991
- Wolfgang Stifter, vice-chancellor in the academic years 1991/92 to 1995/96 and 1996/97 to 1999/2000
- Reinhard Kannonier, vice-chancellor from 2000 until 2019
- Brigitte Hütter, vice-chancellor since October 2019
