= Kulturpreis des Landes Oberösterreich =

The Kulturpreis des Landes Oberösterreich (Culture Prize of the Province of Upper Austria) is awarded as a prize by the Province of Upper Austria. The prize is endowed with 7,500 euros and is awarded annually in several categories.
