= Elke Eckerstorfer =

Austrian pianist, organist and harpsichordist

Elke Eckerstorfer (born 15 October 1974) is an Austrian pianist, organist and harpsichordist.

== Life ==
Eckerstorfer was born in Linz and grew up in Wels. She attended the music high school in Linz and studied piano at the Anton Bruckner Private University. From 1994, she studied organ with Rudolf Scholz, piano with Antoinette Van Zabner and harpsichord with Wolfgang Glüxam and Augusta Campagne at the Universität für Musik und darstellende Kunst Wien. During a study visit to the Paris Conservatoire in 2000/01, she attended the organ class of Michel Bouvard and Olivier Latry, followed by organ studies with Michael Radulescu and Franz Danksagmüller in Austria from 2002.

Eckerstorfer participates in several radio and CD recordings and has performed in several European countries as well as in Japan. In 1995, for example, she played the piano at the world premiere of Nancy Van de Vate's children's opera Der Herrscher und das Mädchen as part of the Kinderklang Festival at the Theater des Künstlerhauses Wien, conducted by Werner Hackl. The recording was released on the Vienna Modern Masters label in 1999. On Van de Vate's album Vol. IV, released in 1998, she also plays the piece Contrasts, for two Pianos, six Hands (1984) together with Sybille Bouda and Christoph Wigelbeyer.

In 2006, she released a CD with the complete organ works of Balduin Sulzer. With recordings on the Breinbauer organ in Ottensheim and Gramastetten, another CD was released in 2008 in the series "Organ Landscapes Upper Austria". In 2011, her recording of the organ cycle De profundis by Hans Stadlmair, recorded in Kremsmünster Abbey, was released. Together with Gernot Kahofer, known as trumpeter of the Blech & Brass Banda, she recorded the album Christmas Trumpet in St. Augustin in the Augustinian Church, Vienna, released in 2013 by Preiser Records.

== Awards ==
- First prizes at the State and national competitions Jugend musiziert Österreich.
- 1998: 1st prize at the international competition for young organists, Aigen-Schlägl.
- 2003/04: Scholarship from the Dr. Robert and Lina Thyll-Dürr Swiss Foundation.
- 2004: 2nd prize and audience award at the XIV. International Johann Sebastian Bach Competition in the organ category, Leipzig.
