= Alfred Peschek =

Austrian composer and musician

Alfred Peschek (14 May 1929 – 4 February 2015) was an Austrian composer and musician.

== Life and career ==
Born in Linz, Peschek was drafted into the Volkssturm as a 15-year-old in the last year of the war, suffered a leg injury and was briefly taken prisoner of war in America.

From 1946 he was able to continue piano lessons, received cello and music theory lessons and wrote his first compositions. Due to interruptions in his schooling caused by several months of hospitalisation, he did not complete the Matura until 1951 and then studied church music at the University of Music and Performing Arts Vienna as well as art history at the University of Vienna. He received his doctorate in 1957 with a dissertation on the masses of František Tůma. During his studies he was a member of the Akademie-Kammerchor, played organ concerts and appeared as a percussion substitute with the Wiener Symphoniker. Between 1957 and 1968 he wrote music reviews for daily newspapers and specialist journals and was on the staff of the ORF.

In 1961, while working as a scientific advisor at the Anton Bruckner Private University, he conducted the first Brucknerfest in Linz and in nearby Sankt Florian, He worked as a freelance musician from 1962, was in contact with international avant-garde artists such as Bruno Maderna, Günter Kahowez and Francesco Valdambrini and finally founded the Neue Ensemble in 1968, a very important orchestra for new music in Upper Austria (collaboration with Eela Craig), as well as his own music publishing house, where, in addition to his own works, those of Walter Pach, Richard Kittler, Erich Urbanner and Augustinus Franz Kropfreiter appeared in the Edition Neue Reihe.

Peschek's Musikverlag was merged in 2010 into Brucknerhaus Linz Verlag, founded by LIVA, which was renamed OÖ. Musikverlag in 2013. On the one hand, the publishing house sees itself as a promoter of the work of Alfred Peschek, but it also strives to attract new composers.

In the 1960s and 1970s, Peschek was regarded as an enfant terrible of the Upper Austrian and the Linz music scene and entertained audiences above all with his own way of presenting pieces of music.

He referred to his compositions as "pantonal music". His own ensemble, the Bergtheater in his own house, offered many opportunities for development, especially in the combination of music and dance. He is considered one of the great composers of Upper Austria. Die Werke des Linzer Avantgarde-Komponisten wurden weltweit aufgeführt und mehrfach mit Preisen ausgezeichnet.

== Works ==
Until 1964, Peschek used the pseudonym Michael Bertrand. During this time he published piano pieces, vocal works, chamber music pieces, an orchestral score and pop songs. Some of the first works published under his name were published by World Library Publications. All the rest were published by the publishing house he founded himself. Peschek is also the author of essays in various regional specialist and local history publications.

== Miscellaneous ==
In 1988, Peschek was the founding chairman of the International Society for Contemporary Music Upper Austria branch and vice-president of the artists' association MAERZ.

Peschek was married in second marriage to the dancer Erika Gangl, with whose dance company he worked in the 1970s. Erika Gangl died in 2000.

== Awards ==
- Theodor Körner Prize
- Kulturpreis des Landes Oberösterreich (1990)
- Kulturmedaille der Stadt Linz für sein musikalisches Gesamtwerk (2001).
- Anton Bruckner Prize (2001).

== Media ==
- Zu Gast bei Hörensagen with Norbert Trawöger, Sendung von dorf.tv, 14 September 2012
