= Gunter Waldek =

Austrian composer

Gunter Waldek (born 26 July 1953) is an Austrian composer, conductor and music educator.

== Life and career ==
Waldek was born in Linz. Already in his youth he received piano, organ and music theory lessons at the Anton Bruckner Private University. After the Matura in 1971, he studied music education, musicology and Romance studies at the Mozarteum University Salzburg and the University of Salzburg. In 1977, he graduated with Staatsexamen and Magister degree and from then on taught at grammar schools in Linz and Salzburg. He completed his further studies (conducting), choir conducting and composition with Helmut Eder with the Magister artrium. In 1982 he took over the composition and theory class from Helmut Schiff at the Bruckner Conservatory. In 2004, he habilitated in composition. In 1990, he became deputy director, and from 2004 to 2008 he was vice-rector of the conservatory.

== Work ==
Particularly successful were the church opera Das Hohe Lied (1993) and Ein etwas seltsames Abendessen, musical music theatre (1994). His extensive output (more than 150 compositions since 1980) includes various genres:

- 13 Ways of Looking at Blackbird (song cycle, 1984).
- ...meins trarens is ... (violin Concerto, 1986)
- Up & Down (Sinfonietta for string orchestra, 1989)
- Lacrimosa (for large orchestra, 1989)
- Dream Songs (after Indian texts for choir, 1990)
- Domklang (spatial installation, 1990)
- Et l'enfant dit: ... (scenic cantata for children, 1991)
- Von der Verwüstung der Westindischen Länder (Requiem, 1992)
- Bows and Arrows (wien modern, 1993)

== Awards ==
- 1994: Kulturpreis des Landes Oberösterreich for music
- 1996: Förderpreis des Bundesministeriums
- 2016: Großer Kulturpreis des Landes Oberösterreich (Anton Bruckner Prize).
