= Kammerchor Stuttgart =

Chamber choir

- Chamber choir
- Origin: Stuttgart, Germany
- Founded: 1968
- Founder: Frieder Bernius
- Members: SATB
- Chief conductor: Frieder Bernius

The Kammerchor Stuttgart is a professional chamber choir based in Stuttgart, founded in 1968 by Frieder Bernius who has remained its leader. The choir performs in changing size, according to the music, from 16-part vocal ensemble to 80 voices in an oratoria choir. The choir is organised as a project choir for around ten projects per year. Kammerchor Stuttgart has been regarded as one of the leading ensembles in Germany.

== History ==
Frieder Bernius founded the Kammerchor Stuttgart in 1968 while he was a music student in Stuttgart. The choir has been invited to European festivals. The group has toured to Israel from 1984 every other year. regular tours to North America and Asia from 1988, and once also to South America. It has performed at the first, fourth and tenth World Symposia on Choral Music, in Vienna, Sydney and Seoul.

The choir's wide repertoire includes Early music, Romantic music and contemporary music. The choir has collaborated with Barockorchester Stuttgart and Hofkapelle Stuttgart, founded by Bernius in 1982 as orchestras for Baroque music and music of the Classical period. Several of their recordings were awarded the Preis der deutschen Schallplattenkritik, the Edison and Diapason d'or.

The Kammerchor Stuttgart performed world premieres of music by Theodor W. Adorno, Gerald Bennett, Arthur Dangel, Heimo Erbse, Johann Nepomuk David, Albrecht Imbescheid, Karl Michael Komma, David Kosviner, Augustinus Franz Kropfreiter, Karl Marx, Volker Plangg, Charlotte Seither, and Winfried Toll.
