= Margit Haider-Dechant =

Austrian classical pianist

Margit Haider-Dechant (born 5 May 1952) is an Austrian concert pianist, musicologist and music educator.

== Career ==
Haider-Dechant studied education and piano at the Bruckner-Konservatorium in Linz, supported by a Bösendorfer scholarship. She also studied piano at the Mozarteum in Salzburg and graduated with a diploma. She then studied with Leonard Hokanson in Frankfurt and Vitaly Margulis in Freiburg im Breisgau. In 2005, she became professor for piano at the Anton Bruckner Private University and was awarded a doctorate in philosophy in 2009 following her dissertation entitled Joseph Woelfl-Werkverzeichnis.

In addition to her work in Linz, a visiting professorship took her to the Mahidol University in Bangkok from 2001 to 2002. Until her retirement in 2014, she directed a concert class for piano at the Anton Bruckner Private University. Among her students are prize winners of national and international competitions.

Haider-Dechant gave concerts all over the world. Some of her concerts have been broadcast by television and radio stations. She has also released numerous recordings. After the release of the CD Wagner for keys, she was invited by Wolfgang Wagner to a concert in the villa Wahnfried in Bayreuth.

Her concert repertoire ranges from Baroque music to modern music. Of particular importance to her, are the works of the 19th century, including Charles-Valentin Alkan, Erik Satie, Groupe des Six, Olivier Messiaen as well as works of Austrian modernism. In 1990, she gave the first public performance of Alkan's Concert sans orchestre op. 39, which had been considered unplayable until then, at the Festival Alkan 1990 in Paris.

The reconstructed 1-movement Piano Concerto No. 6 in D major by Nicholas Cook from sketches by Ludwig van Beethoven in the arrangement by Hermann Dechant was published by the later in 2015 and premiered in Bonn.

Haider-Dechant is President of the International Joseph Woelfl Society (IJWG), which she co-founded in 2011, and Chairman of the Joseph-Woelfl-Gesellschaft Bonn.

She is married with composer Hermann Dechant.

== Recordings ==
=== Piano solo ===
- Balduin Sulzer: Toccata u. Miniaturen, Margit Haider, Klavier, Preiserrecords SPR 145, LP
- Balduin Sulzer: Notices for Piano, Margit Haider, Klavier, Preiserrecords SPR 218, LP
- Balduin Sulzer: Sonate rhapsodique, CD Radio Oberösterreich
- Wagner für Tasten, APOLLON-Musikoffizin CI 20.006, CD
- Mozarts Schüler, APOLLON-Musikoffizin CI 20.007, CD
- Woelfl & Alkan. Zwei Giganten des Klaviers, APOLLON-Musikoffizin CI 20.013, CD

=== World premieres of concerts ===
- Balduin Sulzer: Konzert für Klavier und Bläseroktett. Ensemble Octogon, Margit Haider, Klavier, Oberösterreichische Stiftskonzerte 1993, Stift Kremsmünster
- Joel Diermaier (born 1964): „Per sonare“, Konglomerat für Blasinstrumente, Streicher und Klavier nach Alban Bergs Sonate op. 1.:Festival für zeitgenössische Musik in Nizhny Novgorod, Russia, 2008. Orchester der Musikhochschule „Glinka-Konservatorium“, Margit Haider-Dechant, Klavier
- Arnold Schoenberg: Konzert für Klavier und Orchester op. 42, Österreichische Erstaufführung im Arnold Schönberg Center Vienna, 2008
- Ludwig van Beethoven: World premiere of the Piano Concerto No. 6, reconstructed after Beethoven's sketches by Nicholas Cook and Hermann Dechant

== Awards ==
- 1998: Ernennung zum Ehrenmitglied des Richard-Wagner-Verbandes Barcelona.
- 2000: Verleihung der Ehrenprofessur der Russischen Föderation.
- 2015: Verleihung des Goldenen Ehrenzeichens für Verdienste um die Republik Österreich.
