= Elfriede Grünberg Award =

The Elfriede Grünberg Prize (German: Elfriede-Grünberg-Preis) has been conferred annually since 2000 by the Austrian Welser Initiative Against Fascism for merits in the fight against Nazism. The award was named after the Holocaust victim Elfriede Grünberg.

== Namesake ==
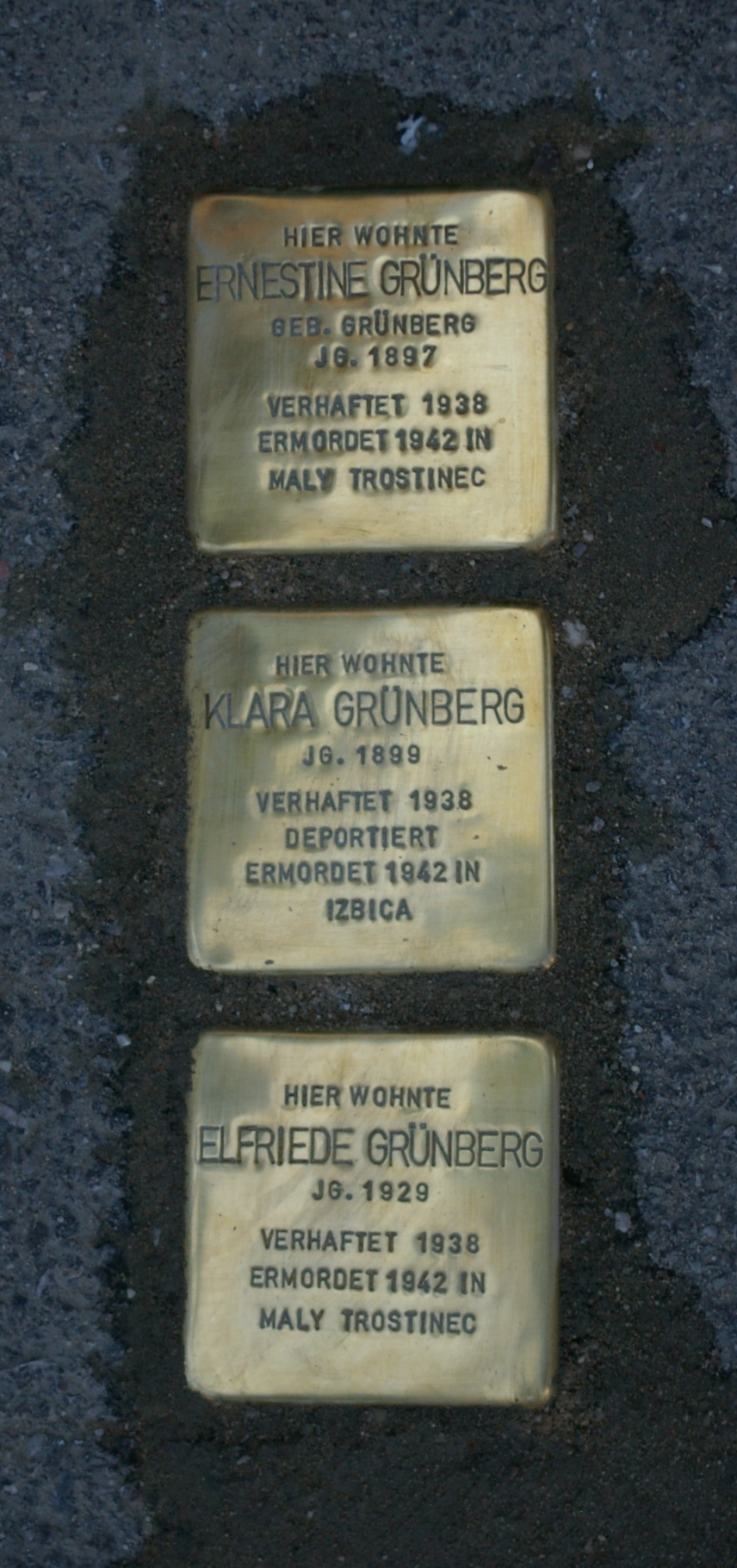
Stolpersteine in Wels commemorating Elfriede Grünberg, her mother and her aunt

Elfriede Grünberg (1929–1942) was murdered by the Nazi regime for racist reasons, like her mother and her aunt. Her father Max was able to emigrate to Shanghai in 1939. On June 9, 1942 Elfriede Grünberg and her mother were deported from Vienna to the Maly Trostenets extermination camp. Six days later, Elfriede was probably killed in a gas van.

== Award recipients ==
- 2000 Johann Kalliauer, Rudolf Anschober, Wilhelm Achleitner, Raimund Buttinger
- 2001 Reinhard Kannonier, Rudolf Kropf, Michael John, Erwin Peterseil
- 2002 Waltraud Neuhauser, Karl Ramsmaier, Josef Adlmannseder, Günter Kalliauer
- 2003 Herta Eva Schreiber, Rudolf Haunschmid, Albert Langanke, Wolfgang Quatember
- 2004 Ursula Hüttmayr, Erich Gumplmaier, Andreas Gruber, Wolfgang Neugebauer
- 2005 Ludwig Laher, Irmgard Schmidleithner, Gunther Trübswasser, Mümtaz Karakurt
- 2006 Leopold Engleitner, Bernhard Rammerstorfer, Irmgard Aschbauer, Georg Oberhaidinger
- 2007 Gülcan Gigl, Martin Kranzl-Greinecker, Gerhard Skiba, Norbert Leitner
- 2008 Brigitte Geibinger, Gertraud Jahn, Anita Eyth, Norbert Trawöger
- 2009 Thomas Böhler, Leo Furtlehner, Walter Hofstätter, Marie-José Simonet
- 2010 Martha Gammer, Astrid Hackl, Ernst Huber, Rudolf Lehner
- 2011 Peter Lechner, Andreas Maislinger, Gitta Martl, Uwe Sailer
- 2012 Margit Hauft, Christian Schörkhuber, Karin Wagner, Peter Weidner
- 2013 Anna Hackl, Sonja Ablinger, Maria Buchmayr, Mary Kreutzer
- 2014 Mario Born, Hermann Hochreiter, Jürgen Pachner, Markus Rachbauer
- 2015 Christian Brandlmaier, Peter Koits, Neue Mittelschule Gunskirchen, Wels hilft
- 2016 Ayfer Sinirtaş, Thomas Fatzinek, Pfarrcaritas Wels-Neustadt, Pfarre St. Franziskus Wels
- 2017 Café für Alle, Klaus Buttinger, Karl Öllinger, Kathrin Quatember
- 2018 Helmut Edelmayr, Open Piano for Refugees, Infoladen Wels, Rudolf Gelbard (posthumous)
- 2019 Brigitte Höfert, Hülya Yilmaz, Günter Kaindlstorfer, Verein denkanstoss.at
