= Josef Friedrich Doppelbauer =

Austrian composer

- Born: 5 August 1918; Wels, Austria
- Died: 16 January 1989 (aged 70)
- Education: Graz Conservatory; University of Graz
- Occupations: Organist; Composer; Conductor
- Organizations: Stadtpfarrkirche Wels; Mozarteum
- Awards: State Prize for Music; Anton Bruckner Prize; Order of St. Sylvester; Austrian Decoration for Science and Art

Josef Friedrich Doppelbauer (5 August 1918 – 16 January 1989) was an Austrian composer, organist and choral conductor. He was professor of organ and composition, especially of church music, at the Salzburg Mozarteum from 1960 to 1988, serving as deputy rector from 1971 to 1984.

== Life ==
Doppelbauer was born in Wels in the last months of the First World War to Josef Doppelbauer (1871–1945) and Maria née Pichler (1879–1962). He grew up with his siblings Karl (1908–1967), Rupert (1911–1992) and Leopoldine (1916–1917) in a musical and art-loving family.

He was encouraged in musical matters above all by his brother Rupert, who at this time was taught by the Johann Nepomuk David, then director of the Wels Bach Choir. From the age of 11 Josef Friedrich received violin lessons, from the age of 12 piano lessons – free of charge due to his special talent.

After his Abitur, he studied at the Graz Conservatory from 1938, composition with Karl Marx and Walter Kolneder, organ with Franz Illenberger, and cello with Wolfgang Grunsky. He passed the artistic maturity examination (Künstlerische Reifeprüfung) in composition with distinction only one year later. He studied simultaneously German studies and art history at the University of Graz.

In 1939, he began studies of music pedagogy at the newly founded Hochschule für Musikerziehung in Graz-Eggenberg, majoring in school music, with organ as his main instrument. In 1940, he passed the organ exam also with distinction.

Following several years of military service in World War II from 1940, and being held as a prisoner of war in Yugoslavia until 1946, he returned to Wels and worked there as organist and choirmaster in the Stadtpfarrkirche, the main parish church. In addition, he studied music pedagogy at the Mozarteum from 1954 to 1956, then becoming a lecturer in music theory and composition at the Brucknerkonservatorium in Linz (now Anton Bruckner Private University).

In 1958, Doppelbauer married Margarete Stroh. They had three children: Andreas (born 1959), Wolfgang (born 1960) and Thomas (born 1963).

From 1960 to 1988, he taught organ, composition and sacred composition at the Mozarteum, where he was appointed associate professor in 1969, and professor three years later. He served as deputy rector from 1971 to 1984.

Doppelbauer died in Salzburg at the age of 70. He was buried on 23 January 1989 at the Aigen cemetery.

== Awards ==
- 1958: 1st prize at the international composition competition in Ghent.
- 1967: State Prize for Music.
- 1972: Anton Bruckner Prize.
- 1978: Knight Commander of the Order of St. Sylvester.
- 1982: Austrian Decoration for Science and Art.
- 1986: Honorary doctorate (Dr. h.c.) Pontifi cio Istituto di musica sacra, Rome.

== Works ==
Doppelbauer was an author for numerous musical journals. He created an extensive compositional oeuvre that includes many genres and comprises nearly 600 titles. He focused on sacred and secular choral music as well as works for the organ. He composed masses, both in Latin and in German, some a cappella and others with instruments.

- "Ich bin dein", for men's chorus. Verlag Merseburger, Kassel
- "Der Krakauer", for men's chorus. Merseburger, Berlin 1962
- Proprium on "Gelobt seist du, Herr Jesu Christ" for the Feast of Christ the King and other feasts of Jesus, for mixed choir with organ settings for prelude and interludes, Coppenrath Altötting 1960
- Choral setting of "Sonne der Gerechtigkeit" for both four voices and three voices, Doblinger Vienna 1972
- Setting of "Ihr Hirten, steht auf" for voices with two violins and cello, manuscript
- Setting of "Pange lingua (Tantum ergo)" for mixed choir, two trumpets, two horns, two trombones, tuba and organ, manuscript, 1949
