= Helmut Schiff =

Austrian composer

- Born: Helmut Adalbert Josef Schiff; January 30, 1918; Bratislava
- Died: December 20, 1982 (aged 64)
- Education: University of Prague; University of Bratislava; University of Music and Theatre Leipzig; University of Music and Performing Arts Vienna
- Genres: Classical
- Occupations: Composer, music educator
- Instrument: Piano
- Years active: 1940s–1982
- Spouse: Helga Riemann (m. 1944–1977)

Helmut Adalbert Josef Schiff (30 January 1918 – 20 December 1982) was an Austrian composer and music educator.

== Life and career ==
Schiff was born in Bratislava. After studying philosophy and musicology at the University of Prague and the University of Bratislava. (1936 to 1938), he studied piano and composition with Johann Nepomuk David from 1939 to 1943 at the University of Music and Theatre Leipzig with Robert Teichmüller and Felix Petyrek. In addition, he also pursued piano studies at the University of Music and Performing Arts Vienna with Emil von Sauer in 1941 and taught at the Leipzig Music School.

He was married to Helga Riemann from 1944 to 1977. The couple lived from 1944 until the 1970s, first in Gmunden and later in Altmünster, interrupted by a six-year stay (1953 to 1959) in Hamburg for professional reasons.

Their sons were Hans Christian (born 1949) and Heinrich Schiff (1951-2016).

Schiff taught composition and piano at the Bruckner Conservatory from 1946, with interruptions through employment in music and secondary schools, until his death in 1982.

His estate is administered by the library of the Anton Bruckner Private University, with scholarships and prize money disbursed annually.

== Works ==
Zu seinen Werken gehören vier Symphonien, zahlreiche Konzerte, Klavierstücke, Kammermusik und Chöre. Helmut Schiff gehörte der Künstlervereinigung MAERZ an.

== Students ==
- Helmut Rogl
- Helmut Eder
