= Mashayekhi =

Mashayekhi is a surname. Notable people with the surname include:

- Afsaneh Mashayekhi Beschloss (born 1956), American economist and entrepreneur
- Alireza Mashayekhi (born 1940), Iranian musician, composer, conductor and academic
- Gisela Mashayekhi-Beer (born before 1966), Austrian flautist and professor
- Jamshid Mashayekhi (1934–2019), Iranian actor
- Nader Mashayekhi (born 1958), Iranian composer
- Sajjad Mashayekhi (born 1994), Iranian basketball player
