= Helmut Trawöger =

Austrian conductor and flutist (born 1948)

Helmut Trawöger (born 10 July 1948) is an Austrian music teacher, conductor and flutist.

== Life and career ==
Born in Gmunden, Trawöger studied flute with Rudolf Leitner, Walter Haseke and Kurt Redel and graduated from the Universität Mozarteum Salzburg in 1973. This was followed by repertoire studies and further training with Wolfgang Schulz, Helmut Eder and Nikolaus Harnoncourt. From 1992 to 2011 he was professor for transverse flute, didactics and professional internship at the Anton Bruckner Private University in Linz.

In Grieskirchen he was Kapellmeister of the Stadtkapelle of the city from 1975 to 1982 and from 1975 to 1990 director of the local Music School. From 1990 to 1995 he was director of the Oberösterreichisches Landesmusikschulwerk and from 1989 to 1995 he conducted the Upper Austrian Youth Orchestra as well as the Upper Austrian Chamber Orchestra.

Trawöger is the founder of several local orchestras and ensembles. He initiated the Schloss Tillysburg academy in 1995 and was its Intendant for 13 years.

His son Norbert Trawöger is artistic director of the Bruckner Orchestra Linz. His daughter Karin Bonelli is a flautist in the orchestra of the Vienna State Opera and member of the Vienna Philharmonic.

== Honours ==
- Decoration of Honour for Services to the Republic of Austria (2012)

== Media ==
- Helmut Trawöger zu Gast bei Hörensagen mit Norbert Trawöger, DorfTV
- Helmut Trawöger bei Cultural Broadcasting Archiv (CBA)
