= Christoph Wigelbeyer =

Austrian choir director, conductor, singer and music educator

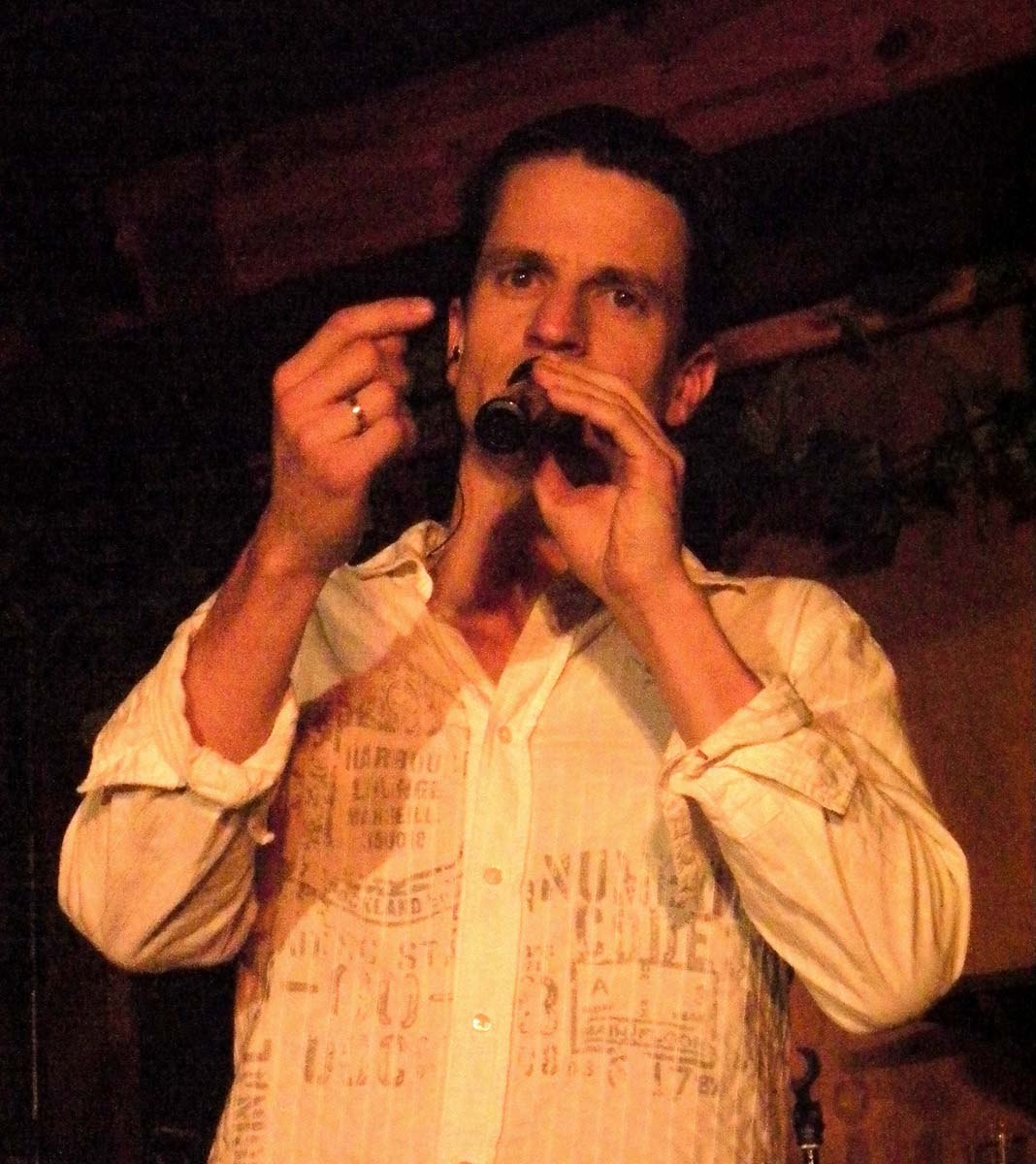
Christoph Wigelbeyer, 2008

Christoph Wigelbeyer (born 1973) is an Austrian choir director, conductor, singer and music educator.

== Life ==
Born in Wels, Wigelbeyer completed singing school, piano and violin in his hometown and at the Linz Bruckner Conservatory within the framework of the Upper Austrian promotion of young talent. This was followed by teacher training in music education and instrumental music education with a focus on singing and choral conducting, as well as three years of solo singing training at the University of Music and Performing Arts Vienna, in addition to which he completed master classes and private lessons. In 1998, in his diploma thesis, he portrayed Ernst Ludwig Leitner, also born in Wels. A year later, he also wrote an essay about Leitner in the Österreichische Musikzeitschrift.

He sang, among others, in the Wiener Kammerchor and the Wiener Singverein (directed by Johannes Prinz) and in the Vocal Ensemble Company of Music (conducted by Johannes Hiemetsberger). On piano, he can be heard on Nancy Van de Vate's 1998 album Vol. IV together with Elke Eckerstorfer and Sybille Bouda, among others, with the piece Contrasts for two Pianos, six Hands (1984). With Eckerstorfer, he also played the Little Suite for twenty fingers op. 61b by Iván Eröd on a CD published in 1997 by the Department of Music Pedagogy at the University of Music and Performing Arts Vienna.

From 2006 to 2008, Wigelbeyer was a member of the Mainstream vocal ensemble and was, among other things, at the farewell concert on 21 December 2008 at the Wiener Metropol. Part of the ensemble. In 2010, he founded the youth choir pro.vocant, which he directed until 2013.

Since mid-2013, Wigelbeyer has directed the youth choir Neue Wiener Stimmen, founded by Johannes Hiemetsberger and Jürgen Partaj, with around 80 singers, which is a project of the Musikalische Jugend Österreichs. Together with Hiemetsberger, he was previously responsible for the choral rehearsal on the occasion of the accompaniment of the spring 2013 programme of the Schweizer Jugendsinfonieorchester by the "Neue Wiener Stimmen". The Neue Wiener Stimmen also performed, among others, at the film music festival Hollywood in Vienna from 2012 to 2016 and, under Wigelbeyer's and Jürgen Partaj's direction, were awarded the title of Choir of the Year 2016 at the Chorforum Wien in January 2017 with the programme "Austria: great daughters, great sons!" Other projects of the choir under Wigelbeyer's direction include performances at the opening of Vienna's Life Ball (2014 and 2015), at the Milan Expo 2015, at the opening of the 2016 Carinthischer Sommer and at the Liszt Festival 2017 in Raiding.

Wigelbeyer is a full-time teacher and choir director at the Bundesgymnasium und Bundesrealgymnasium Wien III. Under his direction, the upper school choir received the rating "very good" at the 2007 Bundesjugendsingen and was subsequently allowed to participate in the performance of the compulsory piece at the final concert in the Festspielhaus Bregenz, a cantata composed especially for the occasion by Herwig Reiter.

He is also a lecturer at the Institute for Music Education Research, Music Didactics and Elementary Music Making at the University of Music and Performing Arts in Vienna.

== Publications ==
- Ernst Ludwig Leitner. Ein Portrait. Diploma Thesis in Music History, University of Music Vienna, 1998.
- Ernst Ludwig Leitner: „So weiß wie Schnee, so rot wie Blut.“ In Österreichische Musikzeitschrift, vol. 54, fascicule 7–8, 1999, pp. 40–41.

== Recordings ==
- 1997: Iván Eröd - Little Suite for twenty fingers op. 61b (with Elke Eckerstorfer; mdw/Musikverlag Doblinger; CSM 9740-AI)
- 1998: Contrasts for two Pianos, six Hands (1984; recording with Elke Eckerstorfer and Sybille Bouda) on Nancy Van de Vate - Vol. IV (Vienna Modern Masters).
- 1999: Franz Liszt - Via crucis - Missa choralis (vocals in the part Missa choralis; Carus-Verlag)
- 2009: Leonard Bernstein - Bernstein: Mass (voice; Chandos Records)

== Film recordings ==
(made during his time as artistic director with the Neue Wiener Stimmen choir).

- 2013: Hollywood in Vienna - "On to New Worlds" & A Tribute to James Horner.
- 2014: Hollywood in Vienna - "Comedy Tonight" & A Tribute to Randy Newman.
- 2015: Hollywood in Vienna - "Tales of Mystery" & A Tribute to James Newton Howard.
- 2016: Hollywood in Vienna - "The Sound of Space" & A Tribute to Alexandre Desplat.
