= Anton Bruckner Prize =

Austrian culture prize

The Anton Bruckner Prize is the main Culture Prize of the Province of Upper Austria (Kulturpreis des Landes Oberösterreich) for music. The prize, which is awarded by the Land of Upper Austria, is named after the composer Anton Bruckner, who was cathedral organist in Linz from 1855 to 1868. The award is endowed with 11,000 euros and is presented in a ceremony in Linz.

== Laureates before 1989 ==
(incomplete)

- 1962: Johann Nepomuk David
- 1964: Isidor Stögbauer
- 1966: Helmut Eder
- 1972: Josef Friedrich Doppelbauer

== Grand Prize winners since 1989 ==
- 1993: Augustinus Franz Kropfreiter.
- 1996: Balduin Sulzer.
- 2001: Alfred Peschek.
- 2003: Fridolin Dallinger.
- 2010: Ernst Ludwig Leitner.
- 2016: Gunter Waldek.
