= Wigelbeyer =

Wigelbeyer is a surname. Notable people with the surname include:

- Christoph Wigelbeyer (born 1973), Austrian choir director, conductor, singer and music educator
- Viktor Wigelbeyer (1897–1969), Austrian bobsledder
