= Scherz, List und Rache =

Scherz, List und Rache, is a 1787 Singspiel in 4 acts by Philipp Christoph Kayser to a libretto by Goethe.

== Recordings ==
Scherz, List & Rache - Annika Boos, Cornel Frey, Florian Götz, L'Arte del mondo, Werner Ehrhardt DHM 2CDs 2019

== Other settings ==
- 1790 Peter von Winter: Scherz, List und Rache (Scapin und Scapine) (Singspiel 1790, München)
- 1801 E. T. A. Hoffmann.
- 1858 Max Bruch, de:Scherz, List und Rache
- 1888 Heinrich Köselitz: Scherz, List und Rache (Komische Oper 1880–1888)
- 1927 Egon Wellesz: Scherz, List und Rache, op. 41 (1927)
- 1934 Hans Vogt: Musik zum Singspiel "Scherz, List und Rache", für Sopran, Tenor, Bariton und Klavier (1934)
- 1949 Fritz Reuter (composer): Scherz, List und Rache (Singspiel 2 Akte 1948/49)
- 1952 Friedrich Leinert: Scherz, List und Rache – Komische Oper in zwei Akten nach Johann Wolfgang von Goethe für Koloratursopran, Tenor und Bassbariton – Kammerorchester
