= Hermann Dechant =

Austrian musician

Hermann Dechant (born 29 November 1939) is an Austrian conductor, flautist, musicologist, composer and music publisher.

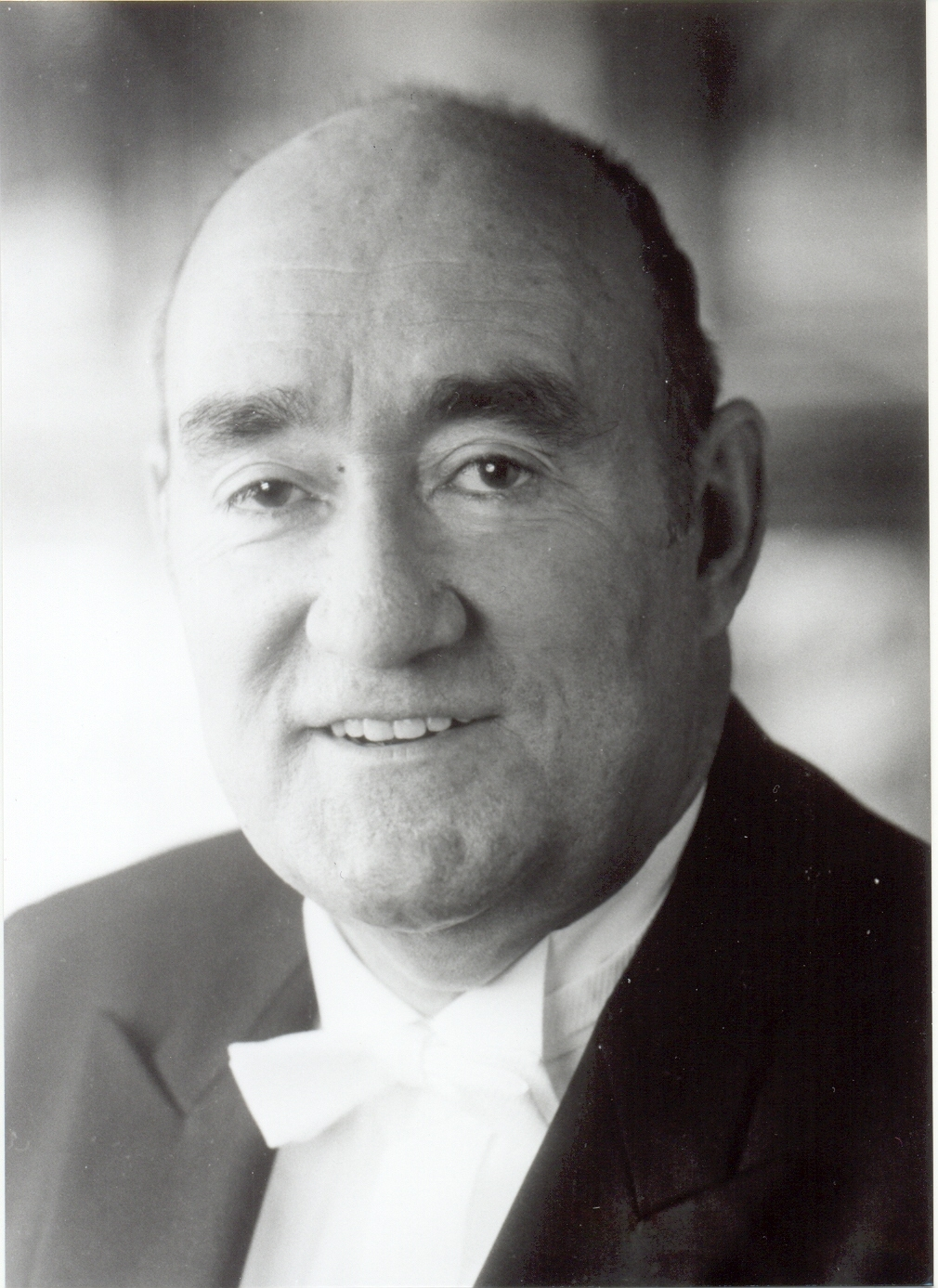
Portrait of Hermann Dechant

== Career ==
Dechant was born in Wien-Meidling as the son of the architect and sculptor Oskar Dechant. After his Matura, he studied flute. (with Aurèle Nicolet at the Berlin University of the Arts) and conducting at the University of Music and Performing Arts Vienna and musicology with Erich Schenk, theatre studies with Heinz Kindermann, philosophy and history at the University of Vienna. He continued his university studies from 1968-1973 and studied with Wolfgang Osthoff (University of Würzburg) and musicology with Hermann Beck at the University of Regensburg and received his doctorate there in 1975. From 1962 to 1966, he studied orchestral conducting with Hanns Reinartz in Würzburg. In 1968, he passed the state examination for composition with Günter Bialas.

From 1960 to 1973, he was engaged by Joseph Keilberth and Eugen Jochum as solo flutist with the Bamberg Symphony Orchestra and performed with the orchestra in 73 countries. From 1964 to 1971, Dechant worked at the E.T.A.-Hoffmann-Theater in Bamberg as director of stage music. This led to collaboration with Gerd Gutbier, Heinrich Böll, Bruno Magnoni and many others. He also became director of the Musica Cantorey Bamberg, an ensemble which primarily performed music from the period between 1450 and 1650 in Historical performance practice (numerous radio and record recordings).

From 1968, Dechant was director of studies of the Bundesjugendorchester of the Federal Republic of Germany and from 1972 director of the federal chamber music courses Jugend musiziert. In 1973, Dechant was appointed to the Hochschule für Musik Würzburg as head of the university orchestra and a conducting class (professor). From 1985 to 1999, Dechant conducted the "Oratorio Choir Bamberg", founded the youth orchestra there and held professorships in Austria and Thailand. In 1993, he conducted the world premiere of an opera buffa by Goethe, set to music by Philipp Christoph Kayser in Schloss Kochberg (Jest, cunning and revenge, 1787).

Dechant currently works together with his wife, the pianist Margit Haider-Dechant (Anton Bruckner Private University Linz), as head of a music publishing house in Bonn. He is the author of numerous scientific articles and books, especially on the history of conducting and the history of music for wind instruments. He is also the author of numerous encyclopaedia articles and editor of opera scores in the monument editions, and is also active as a musician and arranger.

== Publications ==
=== Compositions ===
- Vokalmusik: div. Lieder, Chöre und Kantaten; 28 Bühnenmusiken für das Theater Bamberg.
- Instrumentalmusik: Div. Werke für Orchester und für Kammermusikensembles in unterschiedlicher Besetzung.

=== Recordings as conductor ===
- Hans Pfitzner & Joseph Haydn: Cellokonzerte. Violoncello: Esther Nyffenegger, Nürnberger Symphoniker.
- Florian Leopold Gassmann: Die junge Gräfin/La contessina. Opera buffa in drei Akten nach Carlo Goldoni u. a. (Mitwirkende: J. Pichler, E. Mayer, K. Köller, B. Eisschiel, S. Ganglberger, H. Diller); Collegium Praga Aurea; Bayer-Records, P 1995
- E. T. A. Hoffmann: Aurora, große romantische Oper in drei Aufzügen von Franz Ignaz von Holbein. (Weltersteinspielung). Apollon 1995 (mit H. Ohlmann, E. Meier, W. Koch. Jugendorchester Bamberg).
- E. T. A. Hoffmann: Undine. Romantische Zauberoper in drei Akten (mit: J. Beck, M. Albert, M. Hiefinger, H. Plesch, U. Bosch, B. Hofmann, A. Schamberger, C. Tippe, B. Baier; Oratorienchor u. Jugendorchester Bamberg). Bayer-Records, 1995

=== Publications ===
- E. T. A. Hoffmanns Oper Aurora. (Regensburger Beiträge zur Musikwissenschaft, vol. 2) Regensburg 1975.
- Arie und Ensemble. Zur Entwicklungsgeschichte der Oper. Wissenschaftliche Buchgesellschaft Darmstadt, Bd. 1., 1600–1800, 1993, 229 S.
- Dechant u. W. Sieber (ed.): Gedenkschrift Hermann Beck. Laaber 1982.
- Dirigieren. Zur Theorie und Praxis der Musikinterpretation. Wien/Freiburg i. Breisgau/Basel 1985.

=== Books and arrangements ===
- Ignaz Aßmayer: Messen in D und in C, Partitur und Aufführungsmaterial, Vienna Apollon Musikoffizin
- Johann Sebastian Bach: Violinkonzerte d-Moll, D-Dur, A-Dur, f-Moll, Vienna: Apollon Musikoffizin 2000 (edited with Takaya Urakawa)
- F. L. Gassmann: La contessina. Opera buffa in three acts after Carlo Goldoni among others in Vienna: Apollon Musikoffizin 1999.
- E. T. A. Hoffmann: Aurora. Große romantische Oper. Libretto by Holbein (Denkmäler der Tonkunst in Bayern, N. F., vol. 5). Breitkopf & Härtel 1984 (Partitur)
- Philipp Christoph Kayser: Scherz, List und Rache. Singspiel in vier Akten. Erstausgabe (Kl. A.) nach dem Urtext von H. Dechant. Vienna: Apollon Musikoffizin 1999. XXVII, 464 S.
- Franz Krommer: Violinkonzert in d-Moll op. 61 (Partitur, Erstausg. von H. Dechant). Vienna: Apollon Musikoffizin, 2003.
- Joseph Weigl: Die Schweizer Familie. Singspiel (Partitur, Erstausg. von H. Dechant, in Vorbereitung für die DTÖ)
- Joseph Woelfl: Der Höllenberg. Große heroisch-komische Oper von Schikaneder (Score, first edition and reconstitution of the libretto by H. Dechant). Vienna: Apollon Musikoffizin, 2010 (and three other operas by Woelfl)

== Awards ==
- 1958 Großer Preis der University of Music and Performing Arts Vienna
- 1971 Kompositionspreis der Stadt Hof for the Gesänge der Nacht
- 1992 Kulturförderpreis der Stadt Bamberg
