= Gehringer =

Gehringer is a surname. Notable people with the surname include:

- Charlie Gehringer (1903–1993), American baseball player
- Chris Gehringer (born 1962), American mastering engineer
- Konrad Gehringer (1939–2003), German inventor
- Raoul Gehringer (1971–2018), Austrian choir director and composer

== See also ==
- Meanings of minor-planet names: 31001–32000#086
