= Wolfgang Schulz =

Austrian flutist (1946–2013)

Wolfgang Schulz (26 February 1946 – 28 March 2013) was an Austrian concert flutist and university lecturer. He was principal flutist of the Vienna Philharmonic and professor at the University of Music and Performing Arts Vienna.

== Life ==
Born in Linz, Schulz, violinist Gerhard Schulz' older brother, received his first flute lessons from 1956 with Christiane Schwamberger and Willi Bauer at the Music School in Linz, followed by training with Rudolf Leitner at the Anton Bruckner Private University. From 1960 to 1964 Schulz studied flute with Hans Reznicek at the then Wiener Musikakademie. In 1964 he won the audition at the Volksoper Wien, was principal flutist of the Vienna Volksoper Orchestra until 1970. From September 1, 1970 he joined the Vienna Volksoper and on 1 March 1973 he finally became a member of the Vienna Philharmonic.

From 1979 Schulz taught flute as a concert subject at the University of Music and Performing Arts Vienna. Among his students were Gisela Mashayekhi-Beer, Christian Landsmann, Elizabeth Pring, Günther Voglmayr, Clemens Gadenstätter, Krzysztof Kaczka, Michael Martin Kofler, Karin Leitner and Helmut Trawöger.

In 1983 he founded the "Ensemble Wien-Berlin", a woodwind quintet consisting of soloists from the Vienna and Berlin Philharmonic, to which he belonged throughout his life. From 1996 he conducted his own festival "Bonheur musical" in Lourmarin, France. In 2000 Schulz founded the music ensemble "Camerata Schulz", which performs in changing line-ups and to which some members of the traditional family of musicians also belong. With his son Matthias Schulz, also a flautist and since 2005 engaged in the Vienna State Opera Stage Orchestra, he performed together again and again.

Schulz died on 28 March 2013 at the age of 67 years in the Vienna General Hospital.

== Honours ==
- 2007: Decoration of Honour for Services to the Republic of Austria.
