= Franz Danksagmüller =

Austrian composer and organist

Franz Danksagmüller (born 1969) is an Austrian composer and organist.

== Life ==
Born in Sankt Martin im Innkreis, Danksagmüller received his first musical instructions in piano, organ and theory from his father. 1980-1988 he was a pupil of Walther R. Schuster in Passau. This was followed by studies in church music and organ with Michael Radulescu and composition with Dietmar Schermann and Erich Urbanner at the University of Music and Performing Arts Vienna. Between 1993 and 1995 he studied organ with Daniel Roth in Saarbrücken and then electronic music and music technology at the Studio for Advanced Music & Media Technology with Karlheinz Essl Jr. at the Anton Bruckner Private University.

Danksagmüller was church musician at the Karlskirche from 1990 to 1994, organist at St. Elisabeth in Vienna IV from 1994 to 1999 and teacher at the Conservatory for Church Music in Linz from 1993 to 1999. From 1995 to 2003 he also taught organ and improvisation as a lecturer at the University of Music and Performing Arts in Vienna. From 1999 to 2005 he was cathedral organist and composer at Sankt Pölten Cathedral. Since October 2005 he has been professor of organ and improvisation at the Lübeck Academy of Music.

== Work ==
His compositions include chamber music, music for organ, choir and electronics as well as film and theatre music. His projects include music for silent films in various formations among others in Copenhagen, Gothenburg, Barcelona, Porto and Tokyo, crossover projects with the singer Lauren Newton, bux21 on themes by Dieterich Buxtehude with saxophonist Bernd Ruf and Mozart deconstructed with composer Karlheinz Essl, an improvisation concert with cellist Dave Eggar (New York) on the Internet, performances in the Philharmonie Luxembourg and the Concertgebouw, at the 5th Filmmusiktage Sachsen-Anhalt in Halle (Saale), compositions for the International Buxtehude Organ Competition, the Elgar Concert Hall in Birmingham, the International Holland Organ Festival in Alkmaar, and a performance for orchestra, live electronics and voice with conductor Martin Haselböck and Hollywood actor John Malkovich. His chamber opera Nova - Imperfecting Perfection was premiered as part of the 2019 German Evangelical Church Assembly in Dortmund.
