= Karin Leitner =

Austrian flautist

- Born: 1972 (age 53–54); Vienna, Austria
- Genres: Classical
- Occupations: Flautist, composer
- Instruments: Flute, Piccolo

Karin Leitner (born 1972) is an Austrian flautist and composer. She has played flute and piccolo with the orchestras of the Vienna State Opera and the Royal Philharmonic Orchestra.

== Life ==
=== Early life and education ===
Born in Vienna, with Styrian ancestry, Leitner studied at the University of Music and Performing Arts Vienna with Wolfgang Schulz and at the Hochschule für Musik Freiburg with Robert Aitken.

=== Career ===
She played solo flute and piccolo with the orchestras of the Vienna State Opera, including in a stage orchestra, the Royal Philharmonic Orchestra, the BBC Symphony Orchestra and the London Mozart Players, the Irish Chamber Orchestra, the London Gala Orchestra, the Thames Chamber Orchestra, and the Vienna Mozart Orchestra. She has appeared as flute soloist with the Thames Chamber Orchestra under Nayden Todorov, including in a 2012 concert at St Martin-in-the-Fields in London. She tours internationally with solo concerts as well as chamber music concerts. Leitner gives chamber music workshops in Ireland, Northern Ireland, China, Iran, and South Africa. In 2013, she toured South Africa playing the Suite for solo flute, Op. 57, by Egon Wellesz.

=== Virtuosity on flute ===
Leitner has been described by one reviewer as having "mastery of clarity and consistency" and "a strong clear tone through all three octaves of the instrument ... flute players ... should marvel at her breath control". Others remarked on her "virtuoso exuberance" ("mit virtuoser Ausgelassenheit"), and "beautiful tone and sensitive phrasing" ("schönem Ton und einfuhlsamer Phrasierung"). Her "breath control was exemplary, intonation secure, and finger work as agile as anything the composer could have demanded".

=== Instruments ===
Leitner plays a wooden flute. She also composes music for flute, harp and orchestra.

=== YouTube ===
As of May 2019, her Youtube channel had more than 25 million views.

== Discography ==
Leitner's recordings include:

- 2001 The Gardens of Birr Castle Demesne (flute & harp)
- 2006 Castle Music (flute & harp)
- 2007 Soul Alignment (Flöte & Synthesizer)
- 2007 Music of Great Irish Houses (flute & harp)
- 2009 Earthmagic (flute, harp and orchestra) composed by Leitner
- 2013 Sky Magic
- 2016 Firemagic
- 2019 Music of Irish Drawing Rooms (flute/whistle & harp/voice)
