= Ernst Ludwig Leitner =

Austrian composer and organist

Ernst Ludwig Leitner (born 14 October 1943) is an Austrian composer, organist and academic teacher.

== Education ==
Born in Wels, Leitner studied music education, organ and composition at the Mozarteum University Salzburg and finally musicology at the University of Innsbruck from 1963 until 1968.

From 1970, he taught organ and music theory at the Mozarteum in Salzburg and headed the music education department there from 1973 to 1983. In 1978, he was appointed university lecturer. From 2000 to 2008, he was head of the department of conducting, composition and music theory. From 2000 to 2009, he chaired the Senate of the Mozarteum University Salzburg. Between 1970 and 1996, he was artistic director of the Wels Bach Choir founded by Johann Nepomuk David and performed organ concerts in numerous European countries as well as in the USA and Canada.

== Work ==
His artistic output is documented in the music collection of the Austrian National Library and covers several genres, including four symphonies, eight instrumental concertos, a requiem and three operas. Leitner's works have received numerous awards and have been performed by renowned orchestras and ensembles at renowned venues and festivals. The artist has an extensive discography.

=== Operas ===
- So weiß wie Schnee, so rot wie Blut (1999)
- Die Sennenpuppe (2008)
- Die Hochzeit (2009)
- Fadinger (2014)

== Awards ==
- 1981 Kulturmedaille der Stadt Wels
- 1983 1. Preis beim Internationalen Kompositionswettbewerb München
- 1984 Kulturpreis des Landes Oberösterreich
- 1985 Förderungspreis der Internationale Bachakademie Stuttgart
- 1990 Johann Jakob Froberger-Preis (Kaltern/Stuttgart)
- 1996 Verdienstmedaille der Stadt Wels
- 1996 Kulturmedaille des Landes Oberösterreich
- 2010 Anton Bruckner Prize
- 2012 Heinrich Gleißner Prize
- 2013 Ehrenzeichen des Landes Oberösterreich
