= Gisela Mashayekhi-Beer =

Austrian classical flautist

Gisela Mashayekhi-Beer (born before 1966) is an Austrian flautist and professor at the University of Music and Performing Arts Vienna as well as lecturer at the Joseph-Haydn-Konservatorium des Landes Burgenland.

== Life ==
Mashayekhi-Beer was born in Passau. She studied from 1983 at the Mozarteum University Salzburg with Helmut Zangerle, who was the solo flautist of the Mozarteum Orchestra Salzburg. During her time in Salzburg, she also took part in the master classes of the Summer school with Peter-Lukas Graf.

In 1985 she changed to the University of Music and Performing Arts Vienna, where she studied for the next two years with Wolfgang Schulz, solo flautist of the Vienna Philharmonic. In 1986 Schulz brought her into the Vienna Chamber Orchestra as his successor, with whom she also played her first major tours in South America and Japan.

In addition to her work in the orchestra, she founded the Ensemble Wien with the composer Nader Mashayekhi in 2001. The ensemble's mission is to perform contemporary music in connection with other arts or contrasting music, opening the listener's ears in a new and different way to new music. So there were for example concerts with contemporary Japanese composers, together with European composers who were influenced by Japanese art and traditional Japanese music; or Austrian contemporary music together with Johann Sebastian Bach's The Musical Offering, or even a portrait of the Persian poet Forugh Farrokhzad, with compositions by the Persian composer Nader Mashayekhi and recitation by the actress Hanna Schygulla, to name but a few of the projects. During this time, Mashayekhi-Beer intensified her engagement with contemporary music and its instrument-specific new techniques and profited from collaborations with composers such as Hans Zender, Toru Takemitsu, and Peter Ablinger.
