= Michael Martin Kofler =

Austrian musician

- Born: April 9, 1966 (age 59); Villach, Austria
- Genres: Classical
- Occupation: Musician
- Instrument: Flute

Michael Martin Kofler (born 9 April 1966) is an Austrian flutist. Since 1987 he has been solo flutist with the Munich Philharmonic.

== Training ==
Born in Villach, Kofler received his first flute lessons at the age of ten. Later he was a young student at the conservatory in Klagenfurt. At the University of Music and Performing Arts Vienna he completed his studies in concert and pedagogy with Werner Tripp and Wolfgang Schulz. Subsequently, he studied postgraduate with Peter Lukas Graf at the City of Basel Music Academy. Kofler also took lessons with Aurèle Nicolet as well as András Adorján and André Jaunet. In 1987 Kofler became principal flutist in the international Gustav Mahler Jugendorchester under Claudio Abbado.

== Career ==
At the age of only 21, Kofler was appointed solo flutist with the Munich Philharmonic in 1987. Since 1989 he has been teaching flute at the Mozarteum University Salzburg, as the youngest professor in Austria at the age of 23. Kofler has performed as a soloist with over 90 internationally renowned orchestras such as the Academy of St. Martin in the Fields, the Amsterdam Sinfonietta, the Philharmonic, and Symphonic Orchestras of Munich, Calgary, Prague, Tokyo, Kyoto, Ljubljana, Zagreb or the Zagreb Soloists under conductors such as Massel, Levine, Luisi, Kitajenko, Brüggen, Koopman, Graf, Nott and others and has performed at various festivals.

== Competition successes ==
- 1983 and 1985: 1st prize each time in the Austrian competition Jugend musiziert
- 1987: 1st prize in the Mercadante competition
- 1990: 2nd prize at the ARD International Music Competition.

== Private life ==
Kofler's wife Regine (born 1971 in Munich) was the solo harpist of the Hofer Symphoniker.
