= Leopold Engleitner =

Austrian Holocaust survivor (1905–2013)

- Leopold Engleitner being interviewed during "Unbroken Will", 1999
- Born: 23 July 1905; Aigen-Voglhub, Austria
- Died: 21 April 2013 (aged 107); St. Wolfgang im Salzkammergut, Austria
- Occupations: Farmhand, Roadman, Holocaust lecturer
- Known for: World's oldest known male Buchenwald, Niederhagen and Ravensbrück concentration camp survivor

Leopold Engleitner (23 July 1905 – 21 April 2013) was an Austrian conscientious objector, as one of Jehovah's Witnesses, and a concentration camp survivor who spoke publicly and with students about his experiences. He was the subject of the documentary Unbroken Will. Before his death, Engleitner was the world's oldest known male Buchenwald, Niederhagen and Ravensbrück concentration camp survivor and the oldest male Austrian.

== Imprisonment ==
Born in Aigen-Voglhub, Austria, Engleiter grew up in the imperial city of Bad Ischl. He studied the Bible intensively in the 1930s and was baptised as a Jehovah's Witness in 1932. In the period up to World War II he faced religious intolerance, even persecution, from his immediate neighbourhood and the Austrian authorities, first by the fascist regime of Dollfuss and then under Nazi Germany.

- Spring 1934: 48 hours in Bad Ischl prison
- Winter 1934/35: 48 hours in Bad Ischl prison
- 5 January 1936 – 30 March 1936: imprisonment in St. Gilgen and Salzburg
- 19 September 1937 – 14 October 1937: detained in Bad Aussee prison

When Adolf Hitler occupied Austria in 1938, Leopold Engleitner's religion, ideologies and conscientious objection to serving in the Army brought him into conflict with the Nazis.

On 4 April 1939 he was arrested in Bad Ischl by the Gestapo and detained in Linz and Wels. From 9 October 1939 to 15 July 1943 he was held in the concentration camps Buchenwald, Niederhagen and Ravensbrueck. In Niederhagen he rejected a proposal to renounce his beliefs in return for his release. Despite brutal and inhumane treatment, his will – to stand for fair principles and to refuse military service – was unbroken.

In July 1943 – weighing only 28 kilograms (62 lb) – he was released on condition of his acceptance of lifelong slave labour on a farm.

After returning home he worked on a farm in St. Wolfgang. On 17 April 1945, three weeks before the war ended, he received notice to enlist in the German army. He fled to the mountains of Salzkammergut, and hid in an alpine cabin and a cave, hunted by the Nazis but never found.

On 5 May 1945 Engleitner was able to return home and resume work on the farm as a slave labourer. When in 1946 he tried to leave the farm, his request was rejected by the labour bureau of Bad Ischl, on the argument that the slave labour duty imposed by the Nazi occupation was still valid. Only after intervention of the US occupying power was he released from the duty in April 1946.

- 4 April 1939 – 5 October 1939: prisons in Bad Ischl, Linz and Wels
- 5 October 1939 – 9 October 1939: deportation to concentration camp (prisons in Salzburg and Munich)
- 9 October 1939 – 7 March 1941: Buchenwald concentration camp
- 7 March 1941 – April 1943: Niederhagen concentration camp in Wewelsburg
- April 1943 – 15 July 1943: Ravensbrück concentration camp
- 22 July 1943 – 10 April 1945: forced labour on a farm
- 17 April 1945 – 5 May 1945: call-up to the German army; flight to the mountains

== Rehabilitation and recognition ==
In the years after the war Engleitner continued facing isolation and intolerance, and only after the author and film producer Bernhard Rammerstorfer documented his life in 1999 in the book and documentary film Nein statt Ja und Amen, did the larger public become aware of him. Engleitner and Rammerstorfer held lectures at universities, schools and memorials in Germany, Italy, Austria, Switzerland and the United States.

Though already far advanced in years, between 1999 and 2012 Engleitner travelled with his biographer and friend Bernhard Rammerstorfer more than 95,000 miles across Europe and the US, to schools, memorial sites, and universities, as a witness of history to ensure the past was not forgotten, and he became a model of tolerance and peace.

Once a persecuted concentration camp labourer and outlawed conscientious objector, he was honoured in May 2007 by the Republic of Austria and the Federal Republic of Germany for his courageous stand during the Nazi regime and for his tremendous awareness-raising activities with:

- The Golden Order of Merit of the Republic of Austria from Austrian President Dr. Heinz Fischer
- The Cross of Merit on ribbon of the Federal Republic of Germany (Knight's Cross) from German President Dr. Horst Köhler

In 2003 he was awarded the "Silver Order of Merit of the Province of Upper Austria" by the Upper Austrian governor, Josef Pühringer.

In 2006 he was bestowed with the Elfriede Grünberg Award by Antifa, an anti-Fascist initiative in Austria.

In 2008 Engleitner was presented with the "Ring of Honour of the Town of Bad Ischl" by the municipal authorities in Bad Ischl, the town where he grew up.

In 2009 he received the "Badge of Honour of the Town of St. Wolfgang" from his home municipality, St. Wolfgang.

== Media ==
In 2004, the book and the film Nein statt Ja und Amen were translated into an English version called Unbroken Will, and were presented in the US by a tour including the United States Holocaust Memorial Museum in Washington, DC, Columbia University in New York and the Simon Wiesenthal Center in Los Angeles. In 2005, Rammerstorfer released a new German biography and DVD Nein statt Ja und Amen – 100 Jahre ungebrochener Wille. The book also contains a short biography of the German conscientious objector Joachim Escher: Escher was detained between 1937 and 1945 in several prisons and the concentration camps Sachsenhausen, Niederhagen and Buchenwald; in Buchenwald he was servant to the former French government members Georges Mandel and Léon Blum, whom the Germans kept as hostages. In 2008, Rammerstorfer released a new edition of the German book, entitled "Ungebrochener Wille", which Engleitner and Rammerstorfer presented at the Frankfurt Book Fair during 2008, 2009 and 2011. In 2009 the new English book Unbroken Will: The Extraordinary Courage of an Ordinary Man-The Story of Nazi Concentration Camp Survivor Leopold Engleitner, born 1905 based on the latest German version was released at Harvard University. The Austrian president, Heinz Fischer, described in his foreword to the book that it is "a milestone in correspondence about the horror of Nazism." Brewster Chamberlin, director of archives at the US Holocaust Memorial Museum in Washington DC from 1986 to 1997, wrote a preface. Further prefaces were written by the founder of the Austrian Holocaust Memorial Service, Andreas Maislinger, Franz Jägerstätter and Leopold Engleitner, and Walter Manoschek, from the University of Vienna, "No more War!"

In May 2009 the songwriters Mark David Smith and Rex Salas from California wrote the song "Unbroken Will" for Leopold Engleitner. On 22 May 2009, Engleitner was presented with the song during an event at Moorpark College, when singer Phillip Ingram interpreted "Unbroken Will".

In 2012 Bernhard Rammerstorfer produced with A. Ferenc Gutai the documentary film "LADDER in the LIONS' DEN – Freedom Is a Choice, Nazi Concentration Camp Survivor Leopold Engleitner: A 107-Year-Old Eyewitness Tells His Story." The USA premiere took place at Laemmle's Town Center 5 Theatre in Encino, Los Angeles County, in November 2012 with Leopold Engleitner present. The German version, "LEITER in der LÖWENGRUBE", was released in Austria in March 2013. In April 2013 the film was awarded "Best Documentary Short" by the Fallbrook International Film Festival 2013, of Fallbrook, California, and "Best Short Documentary" by the Rincòn International Film Festival 2013, of Rincòn, Puerto Rico. Engleitner is the subject of Rammerstorfer's educational DVD Unbroken Will. which contains the full documentary plus films of special events relating to Engleitner's awareness-raising activities from 1999 to 2004, as well as material on the Holocaust for use in schools in English, German, Italian, and Spanish.

== Sources ==
- Book Unbroken Will: The Extraordinary Courage of an Ordinary Man-The Story of Nazi Concentration Camp Survivor Leopold Engleitner, born 1905 (Austria, 2009)
- Educational DVD Unbroken Will (USA, 2004)
- DVD Unbroken Will Captivates the United States (USA, 2006)
- DVD Unbroken Will USA Tour (USA, 2009)
- "Persecution and Resistance of Jehovah's Witnesses During the Nazi Regime: 1933–1945" by Hans Hesse, Edition Temmen, 2003, ISBN 3-86108-750-2, ISBN 978-3-86108-750-2
- "Though Weak, I Am Powerful" as told by Leopold Engleitner, The Watchtower, May 1, 2005, page 23-28
- "For Jehovah in the concentration camp – Engleitner", DiePresse.com, 8 May 2010, online, in German
- "107-Year-Old Holocaust Survivor Dies", Encino-Tarzana Patch, May 8, 2013,
