= Norbert Trawöger =

Austrian flautist, teacher and writer

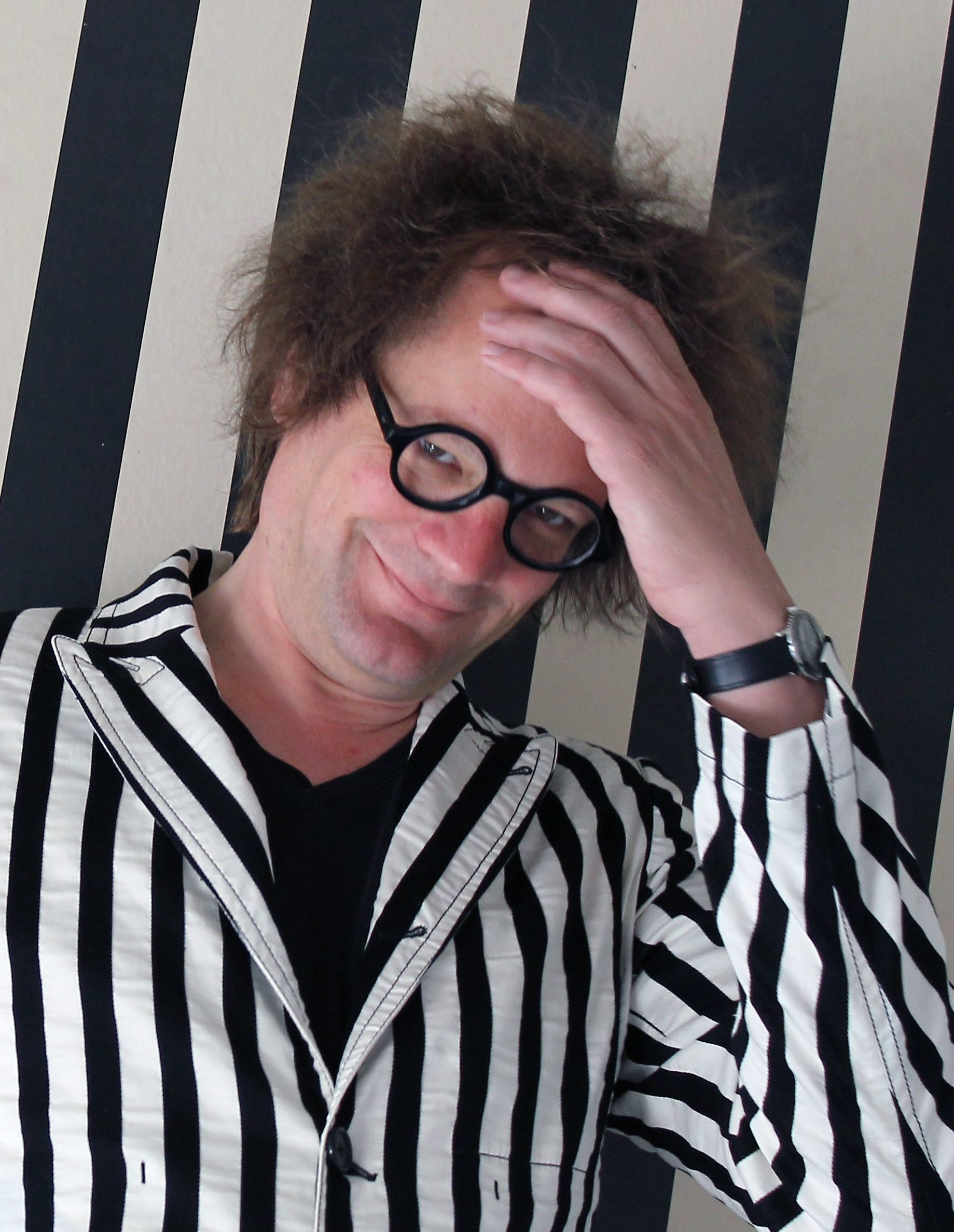
Trawöger in August 2015

Norbert Trawöger is an Austrian flautist, teacher, writer and designing musician as well as artistic director of the Bruckner Orchestra Linz.

== Life and career ==
Trawöger was born in Wels, the son of the musician Helmut Trawöger. He trained as a flutist in Vienna, Graz, Gothenburg and Amsterdam.

Since 2013 he has been director of the Kepler Salon in Linz. Trawöger has been a member of the Künstlervereinigung MAERZ and board member of the Galerie Forum in Wels.

Trawöger was personal advisor to the chief conductor Markus Poschner from autumn 2017 and was in charge of the dramaturgy and communication of the Bruckner Orchestra. Since March 2019 he has been artistic director of the Bruckner Orchestra Linz.

== Honours ==
- Elfriede Grünberg Award for the concert series verboten, verfolgt (2008).

== Publications ==
- Balduin Sulzer, Trauner, Linz 2010, ISBN 978-3-85499-692-7.
- Luftikusse (book and vinyl with Christian Steinbacher and Brigitte Mahlknecht), Krill, Vienna 2014, ISBN 978-3-902919-02-1.
