= Raoul Gehringer =

Austrian choir director and composer (1971–2018)

Raoul Gehringer (1971–2018) was a choir director and composer. His compositions include The Tale of Moby Dick, first performed by the Vienna Boys Choir in 2004.

As a boy, he was a member of the Vienna Boys Choir from 1981 to 1985. He subsequently attended the Vienna Conservatory, where he studied piano, clarinet, music pedagogy and composition. His choral conducting teachers were Herwig Reiter and Johannes Prinz. From 1997 to 2001, he was the director of Chorus Viennensis. He also founded a secondary school. Gehringer was married and had three children. He was diagnosed with ALS in 2011, and died on March 28, 2018.
