= Anna Hackl =

Anna Hackl (born 1931) is a farmer in Schwertberg.

== In the middle of "Mühlviertler Hasenjagd" ==
In February 1945, family Langthaler, who lived in a farmhouse in Schwertberg, hid two Russian prisoners of war: Mikhail Rybchinsky (died 2008) und Nikolai Tsemkalo (died 2001), who escaped from the concentration camp in Mauthausen. At the risk of jeopardizing with their own life, they gave them shelter for three months from February 2, 1945. Even when the SS and Volkssturm came to search the house they had not been betrayed. At this time, more than 500 prisoners had escaped. Just eleven of them survived the freezing temperature and the continuing pursuit of the SS. The majority of the refugees were caught and shot on the spot. These actions went down in history as Mühlviertler Hasenjagd.

In the past years, then 14-year-old Anna Hackl, Langthaler by birth, also received honors on behalf of her deceased mother, Anna Langthaler. Anna Hackl, married and mother of five children, visits about 30 schools per year to tell young people about the horror and difficulties of the period. Andreas Gruber used parts of the heroic deed of the Langthaler family in his movie The Quality of Mercy.

== Awards ==
- Decoration of Merit in Gold for Services to the Republic of Austria (Goldenes Ehrenzeichen für Verdienste um die Republik Österreich, 2010)
- Menschenrechtspreis des Landes Oberösterreich (Human Rights Award of the State of Upper Austria)
