= Karl Marx (composer) =

German composer and music teacher

Karl Julius Marx (12 November 1897 – 8 May 1985) was a German composer and music teacher.

== Life ==
Karl Marx was born in Munich, the son of Josef Marx and his wife Emilie, née Eheberg. After early violin and piano lessons, Marx first studied natural sciences at the Ludwig-Maximilians-Universität München in 1916. His encounter with Carl Orff, with whom he took private composition lessons after World War I, was decisive in determining his choice to turn to music professionally. From 1920 to 1922, Marx studied composition with Anton Beer-Walbrunn and conducting with Eberhard Schwickerath and Siegmund von Hausegger at the Akademie der Tonkunst in Munich. From 1924 to 1935, Marx was solo repetiteur in Felix von Kraus's singing class. From 1935 to 1939, he led his own interpretation class for lieder and oratorio singers at the Akademie der Tonkunst in Munich, where he also taught harmony and form theory from 1929 to 1939. From 1928 to 1939, he conducted the choir of the Munich Bachverein (until 1931 together with Edwin Fischer and until 1933 with Carl Orff). During this time, his first settings of texts by Rainer Maria Rilke were composed, and Marx had his first great success with Rilke's motet Werkleute sind wir, Op. 6 at the Tonkünstlerfest 1928 in Schwerin and at the festival of the International Society for Contemporary Music 1929 in Geneva. Subsequently, his works were performed by leading interpreters, including the Piano Concerto, Op. 9 by Edwin Fischer under Eugen Jochum, the Viola Concerto, Op. 10 in Berlin under Hermann Scherchen, and the Passacaglia, Op. 19 by the Berliner Philharmoniker under Wilhelm Furtwängler.

In 1932, Marx was awarded the music prize of the city of Munich. After 1933, he was exposed to defamation by the Nazi press and his name gradually disappeared from concert programs. Since he did not belong to the Nazi Party, he had no further professional future to expect at the Academy of Music. He accepted a call to the newly founded Hochschule für Musikerziehung (music education) in Graz, where he taught theory of form and composition from 1940 to 1945.

The compositional focus increasingly shifted to choir and lay music, including the Rilke cantata to words from the Stundenbuch, Op. 43, 1942. One of Marx's most famous songs is Jeden Morgen geht die Sonne auf to the words of Hermann Claudius.

The assertions made by Michael Hans Kater in his controversial book The Twisted Muse about Marx's alleged Nazi past are disputed by others.

From 1946 to 1966, Marx taught harmony, counterpoint and composition at the Staatliche Hochschule für Musik in Stuttgart and from 1955 as head of the department for school music. The cantata Und endet doch alles mit Frieden to words from the novel Hyperion by Friedrich Hölderlin for soloists, choir and orchestra, Op. 52, was premiered in 1953. Marx was appointed to the German Music Council in 1954 (honorary council in 1977). In 1963, he was guest of honour of the German Academy Villa Massimo in Rome for three months. In 1966, he was awarded the Federal Cross of Merit 1st Class. Marx died in 1985 in Stuttgart at the age of 87.

== Works (selection) ==
=== Works for orchestra ===
- Passacaglia, Op.19 (1932)
- Festliches Vorspiel (Festive Prelude), Op. 34/1 (1936/39)
- 15 Variations on a German folk song "Was wolln wir auf den Abend tun", Op. 34/2 (1938)
- Music for string orchestra after alpine folk songs (1940)
- Partita for string orchestra on "Es ist ein Ros entsprungen" (1953)
- Festliches Vorspiel (Festive Prelude) (1956)
- Concerto for String Orchestra (1964), (new version of Passacaglia, Op. 19)
- Fantasia sinfonica, Op. 67 (1967), (new version 1969)
- Fantasia semiseria, Op. 75 (1977)
- Reflections for string orchestra on the motet "Lord, you search me" according to Psalm 139, Op. 77a (1980)

=== Concertante ===
- Concerto for two violins and orchestra in A minor, Op. 5 (1926)
- Concerto for piano and orchestra in E minor, Op. 9 (1929; new version 1980)
- Concerto for viola and orchestra in C minor, Op. 10 (1929)
- Concerto for violin and orchestra in C major, Op. 24 (1935)
- Concerto for flute and string orchestra in E-flat major, Op. 32 (1937)
- Fantasia concertante for violin, cello and orchestra, Op. 68 (1972)

=== Music for wind instruments ===
- Divertimento for 16 wind instruments, Op. 21 (1934)
- Tower music for three trumpets and three trombones; timpani ad lib. Op. 37/1 (1938)
- Wind music in four movements for three trumpets and three trombones (1975)

=== Chamber music ===
==== Duos ====
- Sonatina in G for violin and piano, Op. 48/2 (1948)
- Sonatina in C for flute and piano, Op. 48/3 (1949)
- Sonatina in D for soprano recorder and piano, Op. 48/4 (1949)
- Sonatina in G for alto recorder and piano (or harpsichord with viola da gamba ad lib.), Op. 48/6 (1951)
- Music in three movements for violin and piano, Op. 53/1 (1953)
- Sonata for violoncello and piano, Op. 62/1 (1965)
- Six miniatures for oboe d'amore and harpsichord, Op. 62/2 (1974)
- Elegy for viola da gamba and harpsichord, Op. 62/4 (1976) New version for bass clarinet and piano, Op. 62/4a (1981)
- Duo Domestico for violin and viola, Op. 81/2 (1982)

==== Trios ====
- Trio for flute, violoncello and piano, Op. 61 (1962)
- Variations on a Sound, Scherzo and Kanzone for Piano, Violin and Violoncello, Op. 73 (1978)
- Trio for Piano, Violin and Violoncello on Songs from the South Seas, Op. 78 (1980; new version of Op. 69)

==== Quartets ====
- String Quartet in G minor, Op. 7 (1927)
- Music in two movements for recorder quartet or other instruments, Op. 53/2 (1954)
- Twelve Variations on "Nun laube, Lindlein, laube" for recorder quartet or other instruments, Op. 53/3 (1954)
- Six variations on "Es taget vor dem Walde" for four guitars (1957)
- Music for recorder quartet after German folk songs (1963)
- Partita on "Ein feste Burg" for string quartet or string orchestra (1967)
- Quartettino for soprano recorder (or transverse flute), oboe, viola da gamba (or violoncello) and harpsichord, Op. 62/3 (1975)
- Capriccio for string quartet, Op. 86/1
- Tango nostalgico for string quartet, Op. 86/2

==== Quintet to Septet ====
- Eighteen Variations on an Old English Folk Song for Two Recorders in F, Oboe, Violin, Viola and Violoncello, Op. 30 (1937)
- Divertimento in F major for flute, violin, viola, violoncello and piano, Op. 21a (1943)
- Chamber music for seven instruments (flute, oboe, viola da gamba, harpsichord, violin, viola, cello), Op. 56 (1955)
- Quintet for flute, oboe, clarinet, horn and bassoon on songs from the South Seas, Op. 69 (1973)

=== Solo instruments ===
- Three Etudes for Alto Recorder (1958)
- Fantasy for violin alone (1966)
- Partita on "Was Gott tut" for flute solo (1979)

=== Piano music ===
- Piano music after folk songs, Op. 40 (1940)
- Sonatina in A for piano, Op. 48/1 (1948)
- Sonatina in E for piano four hands, Op. 48/5 (1951)
- Piano music after folk songs, second episode, Op. 59 (1960)

=== Organ music ===
- Variations for organ, Op. 20 (1933)
- Toccata for organ, Op. 31 (1937)

=== Playing music for amateurs ===
- Ein kleines Flötenbuch (A small flute book) for singing and playing for two recorders, violin, voice ad lib., Op. 27a (1937)
- Kleine musikalische Reise (Little musical journey) in songs and dances for flutes and violins or other instruments, voices ad lib., Op. 27b (1938)
- Kleine Weihnachtsmusik (Little Christmas music) for three recorders or other instruments, Op. 27c (1938)
- Small Suite after Dances from Leopold Mozart's Sheet Music for Wolfgang for Recorder Quartet, String Quartet or other Instruments (1938)
- Music for string quartet or orchestra with wind instruments ad lib. (1941)
- Klavierbüchlein für Peter (Piano booklet for Peter) (1948)
- Flötenbüchlein für Klaus, 16 short pieces for soprano recorder and piano (1950)
- Second Suite after piano pieces from Leopold Mozart's Notenbuch für Wolfgang for recorder quartet, string quartet or other instruments (1961)
- Balletische Partita (Ballet partita) after piano pieces from the "Musical Flower Booklet" by Joh. Casp. Ferd. Fischer for recorder quartet, string quartet or other instruments (1971)

=== Vocal music ===
==== Mixed choir ====
===== With orchestra =====
- Rilke cantata to words from the "Stundenbuch" for soprano, baritone, mixed choir and orchestra, Op. 43 (1942)
- Und endet doch alles mit Frieden (And yet everything ends with peace), cantata to words from the "Hyperion" by Friedrich Hölderlin for solos, choir and orchestra, Op. 52 (1952)
- Raube das Licht aus dem Rachen der Schlange, Cantata to words of Hans Carossa for baritone, choir and orchestra, Op. 57 (1957)
- Schweige unseres Alltags Plage (Silence of our Everyday Plage), Cantata to words by Albrecht Goes for Choir, Single Voices and Orchestra (1960)

===== With string or chamber orchestra or single instruments =====
- Die heiligen drei Könige (The Three Magi) (Rainer Maria Rilke) for soprano, mixed choir and instruments, Op. 28 (1936)
- Maienkantate über ein altes Tanzlied aus dem Rheinlande for mixed choir and instruments (1937)
- Kantate zum Erntefest (Cantata for the harvest festival) to words of Heinz Grunow for precentor, choir and instruments, Op. 38 (1918)
- Von Opfer, Werk und Ernte (Of sacrifice, work and harvest), cantata after poems by Hermann Claudius for choir, singers and instruments, Op. 36 (1938)
- Auftrag und Besinnung (Commission and Contemplation), cantata for school dismissal after various poets for mixed choir and small orchestra (1961)
- Von den Jahreszeiten der Liebe (From the Seasons of Love) to Verses by Mascha Kaléko for Choir and Seven Instruments, Op. 60 (1961)
- Als Jesus von seiner Mutter ging (When Jesus left his mother), Passion cantata about an old melody from Buchenland for soprano, baritone, mixed choir and instruments (1961)
- Versöhnender, cantata about a fragment from the preliminary stages of the "Friedensfeier" by Friedrich Hölderlin for mixed choir and string orchestra, Op. 70/2
- Wunder über Wunder, Three poems by Joseph von Eichendorff for mixed voices and piano, Op. 79 (1971/81)

===== Choir a capella =====
- Three mixed choirs after poems by Rainer Maria Rilke, Op. 1 (1924)
- Four madrigals for mixed choir, Op. 3 (1926)
- Three Songs for mixed choir after Christian Morgenstern, Op. 4 (1925)
- Werkleute sind wir (workers we are), motet for eight-part mixed choir a capella after words from the "Stundenbuch" by Rainer Maria Rilke, Op. 6 (1927)
- Three Songs for mixed choir after Rainer Maria Rilke, Op. 11 (1929)
- Mensch, was du liebst (human, what you love), motet for two choirs a capella after Angelus Silesius, Op. 12 (1930)
- Songs after old texts for mixed voices after different poets, Op. 13 (1930)
- Leben begehren ist der Welt Trost allein (To desire life is to comfort the world only), Op. 15/1
- Um diese Welt ist's also getan (For this world it's done, then,), Op. 15/2 (1930/32)
- two motets for four-part mixed choir after old poems and book Hiob Four songs after texts by Klabund, Op. 16 (1931)
- Three choral songs after words of Matthias Claudius, Op. 18b (1933)
- Spruch "Blumen reicht die Natur" (Flowers are the gift of nature) after J. W. von Goethe for four mixed voices (1935)
- Chorliederbuch after poems of Hermann Claudius for mixed choir, Op. 39 (1939)
- Novembertag (November day) after words of Christian Morgenstern for mixed choir (1940)
- Three choirs after poems by Fritz Diettrich for four-part mixed choir, Op. 46 (1944)
- Three songs after poems by Rainer Maria Rilke for mixed choir, Op. 47 (1946)
- Gott, schweige doch nicht also (God, don't be silent), motet for mixed voices after words from the 83rd Psalm, Op. 51/1 (1950)
- Wenn mein Stündlein vorhanden ist (When my hour of death has come), motet for four mixed voices, Op. 51/2 (1953)
- Heitere Verse (Cheerful verses) by Wilhelm Busch and Eugen Roth for mixed voices, Op. 54 (1954)
- Bist du auch Meere weit (Even if you're far as the seas) after Ludwig Derleth
- Abschiedslied (Farewell song) by Georg von der Vring, two love songs from, Op. 42, versions for mixed choir (1956)
- Gedenke an deinen Schöpfer (Remember your Creator), Motet after Prediger 12 for four mixed voices, Op. 51/3 (1959)
- Quattuor Carmina Latina after Catull and Horace for mixed choir (piano ad lib.), Op. 64 (1966)
- Choir cycle 1974 according to words of J. W. von Goethe, Matthias Claudius, Joseph von Eichendorff, Martin Opitz and Albrecht Goes, Op. 71 (1974)
- Five chants after Mörike, Schiller, J. Paul and Goethe for mixed choir, Op. 74 (1976)
- ...meiner Sehnsucht grüner Kahn, four poems by Jörg Modlmayr for mixed choir, Op. 76 (1978)
- Herr, Du erforschest mich (Lord, You explore me), Motette after words from the 139th Psalm for mixed choir, Op. 77 (1979)
- Nachlese, nine songs for mixed choir (final versions), Op. 80 (1981)
- Five English Poems (Wordsworth, Anonymus c. 1600, L. Hunt, C. Patmore, Longfellow) for four mixed voices, Op. 82 (1975/82)
- Wandrers Nachtlied – Phenomenon after Goethe's poem for mixed choir, Op. 83 (1982)
- Sechs Sprüche (Six Sayings) from the "Cherubinischer Wandersmann" by Angelus Silesius for mixed choir, Op. 84 (1984)
- Two motets after Joh. G. Herder for mixed choir, Op. 85 (1984)
- Missa brevis for mixed choir, Op. 87 (1985)

===== Liturgical music =====
- Deutsche Liedmesse (German Song Mass) for three mixed voices and three instruments (1949)
- Deutsches Proprium vom Feste Mariä Himmelfahrt (German Proprium of the Feast of the Assumption of the Virgin Mary) for soprano, mixed choir and organ ad lib. (1951)
- Fünf kleine Festmotetten (Five small festive motets) for three mixed voices with instruments ad lib. (1953)
- Such, wer da will, ein ander Ziel (Find whoever wants another goal), motet for three voices and instruments ad lib. (1949)
- Lobt Gott, den Herrn der Herrlichkeit (Praise God, the Lord of Glory), motet for three mixed voices and 2 violins ad lib. (1949)
- Mein schönste Zier und Kleinod bist, Choralkantate for parish singing, mixed choir and four-part wind choir (1954)
- Nun freut euch, lieben Christen gmein (Now rejoice, dear Christians), Choralkantate for congregational singing, mixed choir and five-part wind choir (1955)
- Meine Seele erhebt den Herrn, (My Soul Raises the Lord, the Magnificat German for Cantor, Choral Choir and Figural Choir) (1955)
- Befiehl du deine Wege (Command your ways), motet for three-voice choir and parish singing, instruments ad lib. (1957)
- Sei Lob und Ehr dem höchsten Gut (Be praise and honour to the highest good) for three choirs (eight mixed voices), instruments ad lib. (1962)
- Psalms 18 (19), 64 (65), 91 (92), 135 (136), 147, Baruch's Song of Praise for cantor, choir and organ (1963–67)
- A large number of song sets a capella and with different instruments ad lib. (1932–1970)
- A number of organ preludes and accompanying movements (1944–1968)

===== Cantatas and songs for amateurs =====
- Lob des Sommers (Praise of Summer), small cantata for three voices and three instruments after words from the 17th century (1937)
- Tanzlied im Maien for voices and instruments (1938)
- Gehn täglich viele Leute (Many people walk daily) (poet unknown), song cantata for choir and instruments (1953)
- Musik, du edle Trösterin, cantata after different poets for mixed voices and instruments (1954)
- For what we have received, "Ormesby Grace", grace for three mixed voices (1931)
- Morgenlied eines Bauersmanns (Morning song of a farmer man) (Matthias Claudius) for three mixed voices (1938)
- Zeit der Reife (Time of maturity) (Hermann Claudius) for three mixed voices (1939)
- Hochzeitsgesang (Wedding chant) (Bernt von Heiseler) for four mixed voices (1940)
- Frühling, der die Welt umblaut (Spring turning the world upside down) (Conrad Ferd. Meyer) for three mixed voices (1941)
- Täglich zu singen (Daily singing) (Matthias Claudius) and other old and new songs for four mixed voices, 11 arrangements and 8 with own melody ("Jeden Morgen geht die Sonne auf", "Der Mensch hat nichts so eigen" etc.) after texts by Matthias and Hermann Claudius, Simon Dach et al. (1938–1954)

===== Song cantatas and song arrangements for amateurs =====
- Weihnachtskantate (Christmas cantata) about the song "Vom Himmel hoch, o Engel kommt" for three singing and three instrumental voices (1932)
- Frau Musica singt (Frau Musica sings) (Martin Luther) for three mixed voices and two instruments (1937)
- Wie schön blüht uns der Maien (How beautiful the Maien blossoms) for us for three mixed voices (1938)
- Es geht eine dunkle Wolk herein (A dark cloud enters) for four mixed voices (1938)
- Sagt an, wer ist doch diese (Who is this) for three mixed voices and violin ad lib. (1947)
- Laßt uns erfreuen herzlich sehr (Let us delight heartily) for three mixed voices (1947)
- Und unser lieben Frauen (And our dear women) for three mixed voices (1947)
- Der Winter ist vergangen, Jetzt kommen die lustigen Tage, Und in dem Schneegebirge, O Tannenbaum, Wenn alle Brünnlein fließen, Jetzt kommt die fröhliche Sommerzeit, Der Kuckuck auf dem Turme saß (Winter has passed, Now come the funny days, And in the snow mountains, O fir tree, When all fountains flow, Now come the merry summertime, The cuckoo sat on the tower) (Dutch.), seven song cantatas for mixed choir and instruments (1953)
- Ei wohl eine schöne Zeit, Old and New Songs in Movements for Three Mixed Voices (1939–1954)
- Schoon Jonkfrouw, ik moet u klagen, Al onder de Weg and four other Flemish folk songs for three or four voices, with and without instruments (1958–1965)
- A la claire fontaine and two other French folk songs (1952–1965)
- I will give my love an apple, cantata for three-part mixed choir and instruments (1959)
- Derby Ram, cantata for three-voice choir and instruments (1959)
- Jardin d'amour for four mixed voices (1959) Au clair de la lune for three-part mixed choir and instruments (1959)
- Sù, saltè, ballè, putele (girl, dance, sing and jump), cantata about a Venetian folk song for mixed choir and instruments (1960)
- Es liegt ein Schloß in Österreich (There is a castle in Austria), small cantata after an old folk ballad for solo voices, mixed choir and instruments (1962)
- J'ai tant pleuré (Roussillon) for mixed choir (1973)
- Ého, ého, ého (Burgundy) for mixed choir (1973)
- Mamma, o mamma dimmi for mixed voices (1973)
- Jetzt kommt die Zeit (Now comes the time) for four mixed voices (1979)

==== Choir for equal voices ====
===== With orchestra =====
- Ihr müßt wandern unermüdlich (You must wander tirelessly), cantata in the words of Hans Carossa for female voices and instruments, Op. 57a (1957)
- Halt dich hoch über dem Leben, Cantata in the words of Joseph von Eichendorff for female voices and instruments, Op. 58 (1957)

===== A capella and with single instruments =====
- Four songs after texts by Klabund for four-part women's choir, Op. 16 (1931)
- Abendständchen (Clemens Brentano) for women's choir and soprano recorder (1935)
- Das kleine Federspiel, cantata to words from "Des Knaben Wunderhorn" for three-part women's choir and two soprano recorders (1935)
- Eleven male choirs after poems by Ludwig Derleth from "Der fränkische Koran" (1951)
- In dieses Herbstes Stunden (In this autumn hours), songs and songs after various poets, Op. 55 (1935–1954)
- Pfirsichblüte (Peach Blossom) (Klabund) for three female voices in "Lieber Nachbar", Old and New Songs in Sentences for

===== Equal voices =====
- Three poems by Hermann Hesse for women's choir, Op. 66 (1957–1966)
- Proprium zum Ostersonntag (Proprium on Easter Sunday) for three-voice women's choir (1972)

===== Cantatas and songs for amateurs =====
- Schein uns, du liebe Sonne (Shine on us, dear sun) (poet unknown), Glück (Happiness) (Hermann Stehr) for three female voices (1940)
- Juchhe, der erste Schnee (Words Karl Marx), Wie hoch ist der Himmel (Textversion A. Muggenthaler), two cantatas for children's choir and instruments (1962)
- Endlich ist es nun soweit (Finally the time has come) (R. Habetin) for three equal voices (1965)

===== Song cantatas and song arrangements for amateurs =====
- All mein Gedanken (All my thoughts) and other song movements for three female voices in "Lieber Nachbar" (1935–1955)
- Kein schöner Land, Die Gedanken sind frei and other song movements for men's choir in "Nagels Männerchorbuch" (1952)
- Ihr kleine Vögelein (A. E. Kopp after Angelus Silesius) for three-part women's choir and instruments (1954)
- Freut euch, ihr Schäfersleut und Widewidewenne (Rejoice, shepherd's wife and Widewidewenne), two children's cantatas for voice and instruments (1954)
- The Tailor and the Mouse, cantata for children's choir and instruments after an English folk song (1957)
- Sur le pont d'Avignon, Song Cantata for equal voices (children's voices) and instruments (1957)
- Lavender's Blue, English Folk Song for children's choir and instruments (1961)
- Il était un petit navire (Once upon a time there was a sailing boat), cantata for three-voice choir and instruments (1964)

==== Solo singing ====
===== With orchestra =====
- Gebete der Mädchen zur Maria (Prayers of the Girls to Mary), Song Cycle after Rainer Maria Rilke for Soprano and String Orchestra, Op. 2 (1924, final version 1948)
- Rilke-Kreis (Rilke circle) for mezzo-soprano and chamber orchestra, Op. 8 (1952, original version for piano 1920–1927)
- Three Songs to Words by Stefan George for Middle Voice and Chamber Orchestra, Op. 22 (1934)
- Fragment from "Mnemosyne" by Friedrich Hölderlin for soprano and string orchestra, Op. 70/1 (1973)
- Die Entschlafenen to words of Friedrich Hölderlin for soprano and string orchestra, Op. 70/3 (1974)

===== With single instruments =====
- Die unendliche Woge (The Infinite Wave) (Klabund), small chamber cantata for tenor, clarinet (or viola) and violoncello, Op. 14 (1930)
- Neuer Rilke-Kreis (New Rilke circle), five songs from "Buch der Bilder" for a middle voice, two flutes, two violas and two violoncellos, Op. 17 (1931)
- Vier Gesänge vom Tage (Four Songs of the Day) after different Poets for Bass and String Quartet (also String Orchestra), Op. 25 (1936)
- Botschaft (Message), cantata to words of Friedrich Georg Jünger for one soprano voice, two alto recorders (or transverse flutes) and string quintet (or small string orchestra), Op. 41a (1942)
- Drei Liebeslieder (Three Love Songs) (G. von der Vring, Will Vesper, Ludwig Derleth) for Soprano and String Quartet, Op. 42a (1942)
- Da Christus geboren war (Since Christ was born), Christmas cantata about an old melody for alto, flute, violin, viola da gamba (or violoncello) and harpsichord (also organ or piano) (1951)
- Nur einen Schritt noch (Only one step left) (Luise Resatz), cantata for soprano, tenor and baritone solo, four recorders, transverse flute, violin, violoncello and harpsichord, Op. 72 (1975)

===== With piano and single instruments =====
- Rilke-Kreis (Rilke circle), five songs for one voice and piano, Op. 8 (1920–1927)
- Fourteen Songs after Poems by Hermann Claudius for Voice and Piano, Op. 26 (1936)
- New Songs after Poems by Hermann Claudius for Voice and Piano, Op. 29 (1937)
- Frühlingstau in deinen Augen (Spring dew in your eyes) (Ludwig Derleth), chamber cantata for alto, recorder and piano, Op. 38 (1939)
- Botschaft (Message), cantata after F. G. Jünger for soprano, two alto recorders and piano, Op. 41 (1940)
- Love songs after various poets for a singing voice and piano, Op. 42 (1940)
- Reifende Frucht (Maturing Fruit) (Ernst Kraus), Three Duets for Soprano, Alto and Piano, Op. 23 (1935–1941)
- Fünf Rilke-Lieder (Five Rilke songs) from the "Early Poems" for a voice and piano, Op. 45 (1943)
- Lieder und Sprüche (Songs and Proverbs) according to Goethe for high Voice and Piano, Op. 49 (1949)
- Der Panther (The Panther) and Other Rilke Poems for a Low Voice and Piano, Op. 50/1 (1949)
- Das Karussell (The Carousel) and Other Rilke Poems for a High Voice and Piano, Op. 50/2 (1950)
- Four songs after poems by R. Habetin for soprano, flute and piano, Op. 63 (1965)
- Three Songs after Poems by Goethe for Tenor and Piano, Op. 65 (1966–1981)

===== Canons a capella and with instruments (selection) =====
- Nacht bricht an (Night falls) (Novema Marx) to four voices (1935), also Dutch, French and English
- Sonne ist hinabgestiegen (Sun has descended) (Karl Marx) to four voices (1935), also Dutch and French
- Schläft ein Lied in allen Dingen (Sleeps a song in all things) (Eichendorff) to four voices (1935), also in French and English
- Kuckuck sitzt auf hoher Buchen (Cuckoo sitting on high beeches) (Karl Marx) to two voices in the lower quarter (1935), also French and Finnish
- Laßt uns tanzen (Let's dance) to three voices (1939), also Finnish Sine musica nulla vita to four voices (1954)

== Literature ==
- Art. Marx, Karl Julius, in: Kürschners Deutscher Musiker-Kalender 1954. Walter de Gruyter & Co, Berlin 1954, Sp. 797-799.
- Saalfeld, Ralf von: Karl Marx, sein Schaffen und seine Bedeutung (his work and its meaning). Zeitschrift für Musik, Regensburg, 98th year, issue 5, May 1931.
- Strobel, Heinrich: Die neue Münchener Schule (Junge Musik V), Berliner Börsenzeitung of August 2, 1932.
- Blumberger, Leonhard: Begegnung mit Karl Marx (Encounter with Karl Marx). Dortmunder Zeitung of February 2 and 9, 1936.
- Blumberger, Leonhard: Karl Marx. Zeitschrift für Hausmusik, Vol. 6, Issue 1, January/February 1937.
- Schmidt-Garre, Helmut: Der Komponist Karl Marx (The composer Karl Marx). Die Musikwoche, Berlin, Vol. 5, No. 29, dated July 17, 1937.
- Schmidt-Garre, Helmut: Zeitgenössische Instrumentalkonzerte (darin Besprechung des Klavier- und des Violinkonzertes). (Contemporary instrumental concertos (including reviews of the piano and violin concertos). Allgemeine Musikzeitung, 65th year, Leipzig, dated 7 January 1938.
- Scholz, Horst-Günther: Das Chorschaffen von Karl Marx (The Choir work of Karl Marx). Die Musikpflege, Leipzig, Vol. 9, Issue 12, March 1939.
- Blumberger, Leonhard: Rundfunk-Echo (in it detailed review of the "Vier Gesänge vom Tage", op. 25). Newspaper from 5/6 August 1939.
- Schmidt-Garre, Helmut: Karl Marx. (in: Musiker unserer Tage). Allgemeine Musikzeitung, Leipzig, Vol. 66, No. 34 of 25 August 1939.
- Oehlmann, Werner: Wandel der Innerlichkeit (in it "Vier Gesänge vom Tage", op. 25, mentioned and discussed). The Reich, Berlin, December 3, 1940.
- Bollert, Werner: Karl Marx, der Fünfzigjährige (the fifty-year-old). Musica, Kassel 1948, issue 5.
- Schweitzer, Gottfried: Karl Marx (Zeitgenössische Chorkomponisten) (Contemporary Choir Composers) Der Chor, VIII, August 1951
- Wöhler, Willi: Karl Marx – Abriß eines Lebens und Schaffens (Abstraction of a life and work). Salve Hospes – Braunschweiger Blätter für Kunst und Kultur, 1st Vol., Issue 8, October 1951, of which reprints in: Festblätter zum 14. Deutschen Sängerbundesfest in Stuttgart 1956, Issue 4, January 1956 (Schwäbische Tonsetzer der Gegenwart, III. Karl Marx) and: Wiesbadener Tagblatt, August 1956("Und endet doch alles mit Frieden").
- Oberborbeck, Felix: Karl Marx. Hausmusik, Kassel 1957, Issue 4/5.
- Sydow, Kurt: Karl Marx 60 years. Musik im Unterricht, Mainz, November 1957.
- Honolka, Kurt: Karl Marx 60 years. Musica, Kassel 1957, issue 11. Kautzsch, Christof: Hausmusik bei Karl Marx. "Singt und spielt, Schweizer Blätter für Volkslied und Hausmusik, Zurich, Vol. 25, Issue 1, January 1958, reprint of which in: Hausmusik, Kassel 1958, Issue 2.
- Metzger, Hans-Arnold: Das geistliche Vokalwerk von Karl Marx (The sacred vocal work by Karl Marx). Württembergische Blätter für Kirchenmusik, Waiblingen, 25th year, No. 1, January/February 1958.
- Karkoschka, Erhard (Ed.): Festschrift Karl Marx, Stuttgart 1967, in which among other things: Willi Wöhler, Karl Marx – outline of his life and work; Josef Friedrich Doppelbauer, Die a cappella-Chorwerke; Martin Gümbel, Marginalien zur Hölderlinkantate opus 52; Erhard Karkoschka, Neue Methoden der musikalischen Analyse und einigen Anwendungen auf späte Instrumentalwerke von Karl Marx; Rainer Zillhardt, Das Trio für Klavier, Flöte und Violoncello opus 61; Willi Wöhler, Anmerkungen zur Instrumentation Marxscher Orchesterwerke; Heinrich Deppert, Karl Marx' essays, lectures and analyses; Willi Wöhler, Karl Marx und seine Dichter; catalogue of works.
- Karkoschka, Erhard: Über späte Instrumentalwerke von Karl Marx (On late instrumental works by Karl Marx), Musica 26, Kassel 1972, pp. 542 ff Gudrun Straub, Günther Weiß, Josef Friedrich Doppelbauer: Karl Marx, Komponisten in Bayern (Composers in Bavaria), Volume 3; in which among others: G. Straub, Life and Work of Karl Marx, G. Weiß, Conversation with Karl Marx, J. F. Doppelbauer, The Works of Karl Marx, Catalogue of Works and Discography (pp. 133–152). Tutzing 1983. ISBN 3-7952-0403-8.
- Fellmann, Berthold: Marx, Karl. In: Neue Deutsche Biographie (NDB). Volume 16, Duncker & Humblot, Berlin 1990, ISBN 3-428-00197-4, pp. 344–346 (digital edition).
- Rottensteiner, Gudrun: Art. Karl Marx, in Komponisten der Gegenwart
- Riemann 3, p. 303; Die Musik in Geschichte und Gegenwart 11, p. 1239; 16, p. 17

== Documents and publications ==
- Letters by Karl Marx, in the collection of the Leipzig music publisher C. F. Peters in the State Archive Leipzig
- Analyse der Klaviersonate B-Dur (KV 333) von W. A. Mozart (Analysis of the Piano Sonata B-flat major, K. 333 by W. A. Mozart), Stuttgart 1966.
- Zur Einheit der zyklischen Form bei Mozart, Stuttgart 1971, with 134 examples of music. Neue Musik – Ausdruck unserer Zeit (New music – expression of our time). Hausmusik, Vol. 13, 1949, pp. 29–38.
- Der Neue Liedsatz (The New Song). Hausmusik, Vol. 15, 1951, pp. 117–125.
- Einführung in ein zeitgenössisches symphonisches Werk: Béla Bartók, Musik für Saiteninstrumente, Schlagzeug und Celesta (Introduction to a contemporary symphonic work: Béla Bartók, music for string instruments, percussion and celesta). . Musikerziehung in der Schule, Mainz 1965, pp. 216–232.
- Schulmusik zwischen Kunst und Wissenschaft (School music between art and science). Musica, vol. 12, 1958, p. 511-514.
- Grenzen des Verständnisses und der Ausführbarkeit in den Bereichen der Gebrauchsmusik (Limits of understanding and practicability in the field of commercial music). Hausmusik, 24th year 1960, pp. 116–124.
- Kassel Music Festival. Hausmusik, 25th year 1961, pp. 169–179.
- Über die zyklische Sonatensatzform, zu dem Aufsatz von Günther von Noé (On the cyclic sonata form, to the essay by Günther von Noé). Neue Zeitschrift für Musik, 125th year 1964, pp. 142–146.
- Einige Anmerkungen zu Schuberts Forellenquintett und Oktett (Some notes on Schubert's trout quintet and octet). Neue Zeitschrift für Musik, 132nd year 1971, pp. 588–592.
- Über thematische Beziehungen in Haydns Londoner Symphonien (On thematic relations in Haydn's London symphonies). Haydn-Studien, vol. IV, 1976, pp. 1–20.
- Der musikalische Schaffensprozeß (The musical creative process). Schwäbische Sängerzeitung, Vol. 31, 1982, pp. 256–260.
