= Bernhard Rammerstorfer =

Austrian author and film director

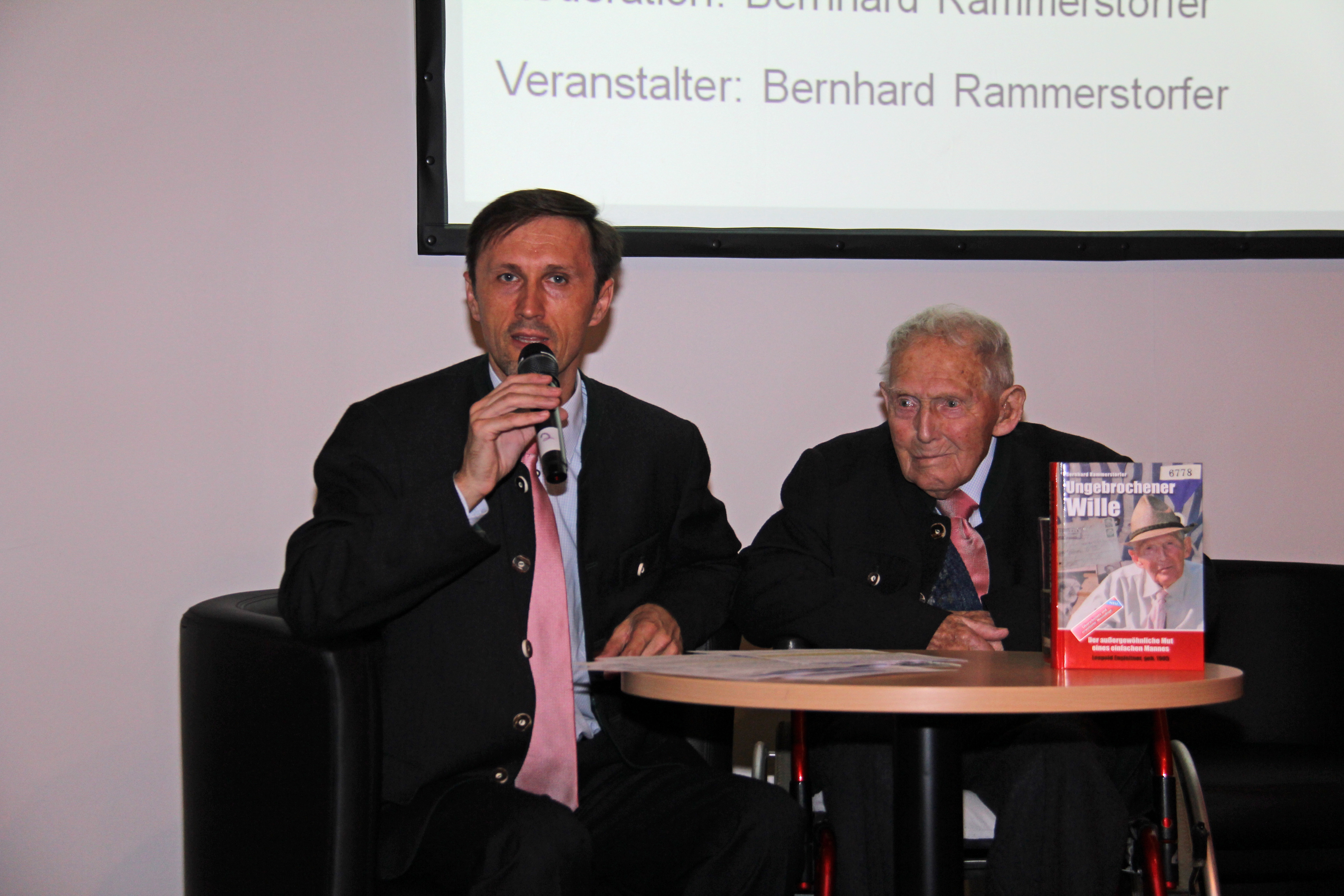
Frankfurter Buchmesse 2011 - Rammerstorfer und Engleitneer

Bernhard Rammerstorfer (born 1968) is an Austrian author and film director. His book Unbroken Will (German: Nein statt Ja und Amen) is a biography of the Austrian Jehovah's Witness and Holocaust survivor Leopold Engleitner. He later made a documentary film with the same title. His 2012 documentary Ladder in the Lions' Den, made with A. Ferenc Gutai, received a special jury mention at the online European International Film Festival in 2016, and took second place in the "Best Festival Film" category and won the "Best Documentary Film Award" at the Switzerland International Film Festival in 2018.

== Awards ==
For Ladder in the Lions' Den

- —Winner: Best Documentary Short at the Fallbrook International Film Festival 2013, Fallbrook, California, USA
- —Winner: Best Short Documentary at the Rincón International Film Festival 2013, Rincón, Puerto Rico
- —Winner: Audience Choice Award for a Documentary at the Marina del Rey Film Festival 2013, Los Angeles County, California, USA
- —Winner: Best International Feature Documentary at the Laughlin International Film Festival 2013, Laughlin, Nevada, USA
- —Official Selection: Festival of Tolerance: 7th Zagreb International Jewish Film Festival 2013, Zagreb, Croatia
- —Official Selection: Festival of Tolerance: 1st Rijeka International Jewish Film Festival 2013, Rijeka, Croatia
- —Official Selection: Chagrin Documentary Film Festival 2013, Chagrin Falls, Ohio, USA
- —Official Selection: Life Fest Film Festival 2014, Hollywood, California, USA
- —Nomination: Alan Fortunoff Humanitarian Award at the Long Island International Film Expo 2014, Long Island, New York, USA
- —Nomination: Best Documentary at the Long Island International Film Expo 2014, Long Island, New York, USA
- —Official Selection: Green Bay Film Festival 2015, Green Bay, Wisconsin, USA
- —Winner: Special Jury Mention at the European International Film Festival 2016, St. Petersburg, Russia
- —Winner: Best Documentary Short at the Cutting Edge International Film Festival 2016, Florida, USA
- —Winner: Audience Award at the Cutting Edge International Film Festival 2016, Florida, USA
- —Winner: Best Religious/Spiritual Film at the Erie International Film Festival 2016, Pennsylvania, USA
- —Official Selection: GardenCity International Film Festival 2017, Bangalore, India
- —Winner: Best Documentary Film at the "Switzerland International Film Festival 2018", Schwitzerland, Europe
- —Semi-Finalist: Best Documentary at the film festival "Film for Peace 2020", Toronto, Canada

For Taking the Stand:

- —Nomination: Best Documentary at the Long Island International Film Expo 2016, Long Island, New York, USA
- —Winner: Alan Fortunoff Humanitarian Award at the Long Island International Film Expo 2016, Long Island, New York, USA
- —Winner: Best Short Documentary Film at the Laughlin International Film Festival 2016, Laughlin, Nevada, USA
- —Finalist: European International Film Festival 2017, St. Petersburg, Russia
- —Finalist: Golden Hollywood International Film Festival 2019, Hollywood, California, USA
