= Wolfgang Glüxam =

Austrian harpsichordist and organist (1958–2020)

Wolfgang Glüxam (17 November 1958 – 29 July 2020) was an Austrian harpsichordist and organist.

== Life ==
Born in Melk, Glüxam studied harpsichord with Ton Koopman at the Sweelinck Conservatorium in Amsterdam and organ with Alfred Mitterhofer at the Universität für Musik und darstellende Kunst Wien, where he taught himself since 1985.

His CD recordings have been released by the Austrian radio. Among others, they include Bach's Goldberg Variations, Pièces de clavecin by Jacques Duphly and four-handed sonatas by W.A. Mozart (with Patrick Ayrton). He also played a harpsichord player in the 1995 film Before Sunrise.

Glüxam died in Vienna at the age of 61 and was buried at the Baumgartner Cemetery.
