= Augustinus Franz Kropfreiter =

Austrian composer and organist

Augustinus Franz Kropfreiter (9 September 1936 – 26 September 2003) was member of the Austrian Augustiner-Chorherren, composer and organist.

== Life ==
Born in Hargelsberg, Kropfreiter spent his school years from 1948 at the Catholic Bischöfliches Gymnasium Petrinum, where he received his first basic musical education. Immediately after the Matura he entered the Augustiner-Chorherrenstift St. Florian in 1953, where he was initially taught music theory by Johann Krichbaum. From 1955 to 1960 he studied composition and organ at the Linz Anton Bruckner Private University and at the University of Music and Performing Arts Vienna. After completing his studies, he worked as an organist in Sankt Florian. Along the way he was also a teacher of the St. Florian Boys' Choir and, from 1966, director of the monastery choir (Regens Chori).

Kropfreiter died in 2003 in Sankt Florian at the age of 68.

== Works ==
Kropfreiter created an extensive organ oeuvre and is thus one of the most important Austrian organ composers of the 20th century. He helped The St. Florian Monastery to even greater fame. He composed several orchestral works (among others organ concertos, 3 symphonies), masses, church music, choral music, chamber music and organ pieces (among others Toccata francese, Signum, Numerous chorale arrangements of varying degrees of difficulty), with which he achieved fame not only in Austria. In his compositions, he attached great importance to polytonality and hindemithian counterpoint.

== Awards ==
- 1962: Kulturpreis des Landes Oberösterreich
- 1964: Staatspreis für Musik
- 1993: Anton Bruckner Prize
- 2001: Austrian Decoration for Science and Art I. Klasse.
- 2002: Österreichischer Kunstpreis für Musik.
- 2002: Heinrich Gleißner Prize.
