= Philipp Christoph Kayser =

German composer

Philipp Christoph Kayser (10 March 1755 – 24 December 1823) was a German pianist, composer, orchestra musician, music teacher and poet. He was a close friend of Johann Wolfgang von Goethe.

== Life ==
Kayser was born in Frankfurt on 10 March 1755, the son of the organist of the St. Catherine's Church, Frankfurt. His father gave him his first music lessons. He studied music theory with Georg Andreas Sorge. Already at grammar school, Kayser became friends with Friedrich Maximilian Klinger, who was three years older and later became the most successful playwright of the Sturm und Drang movement. Johann Wolfgang von Goethe also joined him later, as did the Strasbourg poet Heinrich Leopold Wagner and the Livonian Jakob Michael Reinhold Lenz, who lived in Strasbourg and visited Frankfurt from time to time.

In 1774, Kayser became a freemason in the Zurich lodge Modestia cum libertate.

In 1775, Kayser moved to Zurich. Goethe paid him a visit there in 1775 and 1779. Goethe was so enthusiastic about his songs, that he sent him his Singspiel "Jery und Bäteli" for setting to music. First Kayser refused. However, this did not harm Goethe - he still stood by him as his chosen composer. "What I appreciate most about things is precisely this chastity, the certainty of being able to achieve a lot with a little," he wrote to him.

In 1780, Kayser's Christmas cantata was published by his publisher Füssli in Zurich. Two sonatas for violin, piano and horns appeared shortly afterwards, but without dating.

At Goethe's invitation, Kayser visited him in Weimar from January to May 1781. During this visit, Goethe entrusted him with the setting of his Singspiele to music. But Kayser was clumsy and worked slowly. Only years later his setting to Goethe's Singspiel Scherz, List und Rache was completed in 1785. After receiving the score, Goethe wrote to Fritz Jacobi in Düsseldorf: "With this opera a composer will emerge, the likes of whom not many people form in silence".

Goethe, who often supported Kayser financially out of friendship, even sent him to Rome at his own expense in 1787, as he wanted him to compose the score for his Egmont before Beethoven composed the incindetal music in 1810. After 1792, Kayser published nothing more. Goethe had already recognised the hopelessness of further collaboration and had found a replacement for Kayser in Johann Friedrich Reichardt in 1789.

It can also be assumed that Kayser basically gave up composing in 1792. He earned his living by teaching. "It was difficult to become friends with Kayser, for his earlier seriousness increased to the point of darkness," wrote Franz Xaver Schnyder von Wartensee, who had come to Zurich to continue his musical studies. Kayser died on Christmas Eve in Zurich in 1823 at the age of 68.

== The Singspiel Scherz, List und Rache (Joke, cunning and revenge) ==
Kayser was probably the only one who set Goethe's libretto, which was later composed quite often, to music in the complete four-act original version, this in the form of an Opera buffa with seccore citations, a type of opera that Goethe had only really come to appreciate in Italy. The premiere of this opera took place two hundred years later on 26 November 1993 in Schloss Kochberg. Thuringia, in an arrangement by the conductor Hermann Dechant tailored to the needs of the small orchestra (director: Bisser Schinew, production designer: Hank Irwin Kittel).

A concert performance with full orchestra took place on 28 November 2019 from the Bayer Erholungshaus, Leverkusen and was recorded for the radio.

== Exhibition ==
On the occasion of the 250th anniversary of his birthday, the Zentralbibliothek Zürich honoured Philipp Christoph Kayser with an exhibition, which was also shown at the Goethe-Museum in Düsseldorf.

== Works (after poems by Goethe) ==
- Erwin und Elmire, ein Schauspiel mit Gesang (1777)
- Jery und Bäteli, Singspiel 1 act (1779)
- Scherz, List und Rache, Singspiel, 4 acts (1787)
- Stage music for Egmont (1788), lost.
