= Balduin Sulzer =

Austrian Roman Catholic priest (1932–2019)

Balduin Sulzer (Cistercians) (as Josef Sulzer (15 March 1932 – 10 April 2019) was an Austrian Roman Catholic priest. He became known as a music educator and composer.

== Life ==
Sulzer was born in Großraming. At the age of ten Sulzer came to Linz, where he attended grammar school. He sang as an altar boy in the New Cathedral, Linz in the "Domschola" under the direction of Domkapellmeister Josef Kronsteiner. After the Matura, he joined the religious order of the Cistercians in Wilhering Abbey in 1949 and received the religious name "Balduin". He began his philosophical-theological studies in Linz and Rome, as well as studying history at the University of Vienna. He completed his musical education at the Bruckner Conservatory in Linz, at the Pontifical Institute of Sacred Music in Rome and at the University of Music and Performing Arts Vienna, among others with Hans Gillesberger.

In 1955, Balduin Sulzer received the priesthood ordination. From 1959 to 1977, he was a music teacher at the Wilhering Abbey, where he led the Wilhering Boys' Choir and the Wilhering Kantorei. From 1974 to 1997, Sulzer was a music professor at the Linzer Musikgymnasium. He was also répétiteur at Linz's Anton Bruckner Private University and cathedral conductor. Franz Welser-Möst studied composition with Sulzer, the tenor Kurt Azesberger and the soprano Anna Maria Pammer were also his pupils. Sulzer was the founder and musical director of the Linz Music High School, where he worked from 1974 until his retirement in 1997.

Sulzer lived and worked at Wilhering Abbey, where he also served as Stiftskapellmeister.

Sulzer died in Linz at the age of 87.

== Works ==
Sulzer's oeuvre comprises over 400 works, including four operas, children's musicals, nine symphonies, a passion, twelve instrumental concertos, piano and chamber music as well as Lieder and choral music.

== Awards ==
- 1970: Förderungspreis des Landes Oberösterreich für Komposition
- 1977: Kulturpreis des Landes Oberösterreich für Musik
- 1979: Förderungspreis vom Amt der Oberösterreichischen Landesregierung
- 1984: Kulturmedaille der Stadt Linz
- 1992: Goldenes Ehrenzeichen vom Tiroler Sängerbund
- 1993: Heinrich Gleißner Prize
- 1996:
  - Anton Bruckner Prize (Großer Kulturpreis des Landes Oberösterreich)
  - Kunstwürdigungspreis der Stadt Linz
  - Ehrenring der Marktgemeinde Wilhering
  - Österreichischer Kunstpreis für Musik
- 2007: Kulturmedaille der Stadt Linz
- 2011: Goldenes Ehrenzeichen für Verdienste um die Republik Österreich
- 2012: Ehrenbürger of the Marktgemeinde Wilhering
