= Nader Mashayekhi =

Persian composer (born 1958)

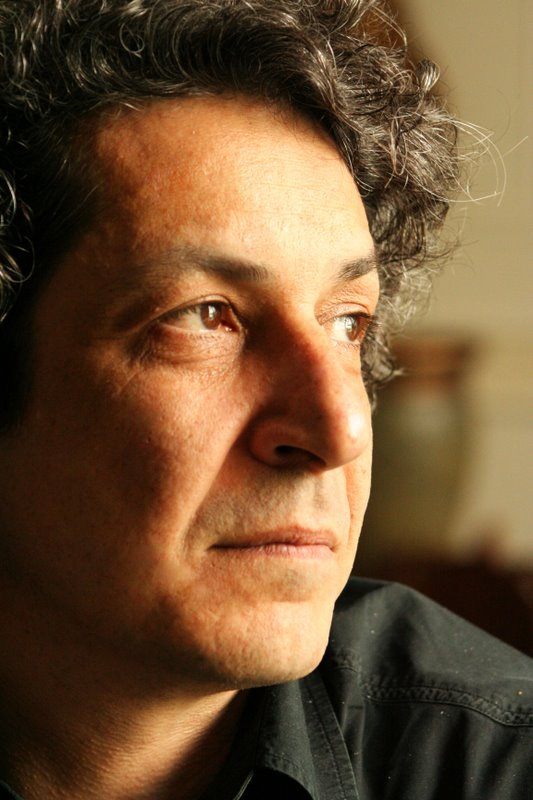
Nader Mashayekhi

Nader Mashayekhi (Persian: نادر مشایخی; born November 26, 1958, in Tehran) is an Iranian composer. From 2006 to July 2007 he was conductor of the Tehran Symphony Orchestra. He is the son of Jamshid Mashayekhi.

Mashayekhi studied under Roman Haubenstock-Ramati at the University of Music and Performing Arts, Vienna.

In the 1990s he was music director of the Austrian new music ensemble "Wien 2001".

His works have been performed by Klangforum Wien (1992–95), Ensemble Work in Progress, Berlin (1993), Ensemble Zwischen Töne, Berlin (1997–2000), Savarian Symphony Orchestra (1997), Radio Symphony Orchestra, Vienna (1998), and the Tehran Symphony Orchestra (1998–2000).
