= Herwig Reiter =

Austrian composer (born 1941)

Herwig Reiter (born 26 June 1941, in Waidhofen an der Thaya) is an Austrian composer.

== Discography ==
- Reiter: Es ist Feuer unter der Erde; Gesang der Engel
