= Helmut Eder =

Austrian composer (1916–2005)

Helmut Eder (December 26, 1916, Linz – February 8, 2005, Salzburg) was an Austrian composer.

Eder studied until 1948 at the Linz Conservatory, later studying with Johann Nepomuk David in Stuttgart and Carl Orff in Munich. Returning to Linz, he became a teacher at the Linz Conservatory, accepting a position as full professor in 1962. He also conducted the Singakademie in Linz from 1953 to 1960 and founded an electronic music studio in the city in 1959. He became professor of composition at the Salzburg Mozarteum in 1967.

Eder composed in a wide variety of traditional genres, and also wrote scores for film, television, and radio.

== Works ==
Eder's works are mainly published by Doblinger.

Operas

- Oedipus (1958/59), H. Weinstock, after Sophocles, 1960 Linz
- Der Kardinal (1961/62), E. Brauner, 1965 Linz
- Die weiße Frau (1966), K. Kleinschmidt
- Konfigurationen 3 (1969), R. Bayr Vienna
- Der Aufstand (1976), Gertrud Fussenegger, Linz
- Georges Dandin (1979), Linz
- Mozart in New York (1989/90), Herbert Rosendorfer, 1991 Salzburg

Other

Note: this list is incomplete

- Concerto Semiserio (2 pianos, orchestra, 1962)
- Memento for Positive Organ and strings, Op.57 (1971)
- Concertino for Viola, Winds and Percussion, Op.124 (2002)
- Concerto "Der reisende Schatten" for Viola and Orchestra, Op.116 (1999)
- Concertino for Orchestra (1986)
- Violin Concerto
- Oboe Concerto
- Bassoon Concerto
- Organ Concerto on L'homme armé
- Divertimento for Soprano and Orchestra, Op.64
- Metamorphosen on a fragment of Mozart (1970)
- ...Missa est, Op.86 (1986)
- Suite with Intermezzi (for wind ensemble), Op.71
- Jeu parti for Viola and Piano, Op.102 (1993)
- 3 Sätze (3 Movements) for Viola, Double Bass and Piano, Op.73 No.3 (1983)
- Sonatine for Viola and Piano, Op.34 No.2 (1963)
- Sonatine for Horn and Piano
- String Quartet No.3 (1986)
- Wind Quintet No.3, Op.91
- Symphonies, ballets, other chamber works, organ works, choral music, songs
