= Johann Nepomuk David =

Austrian composer (1895–1977)

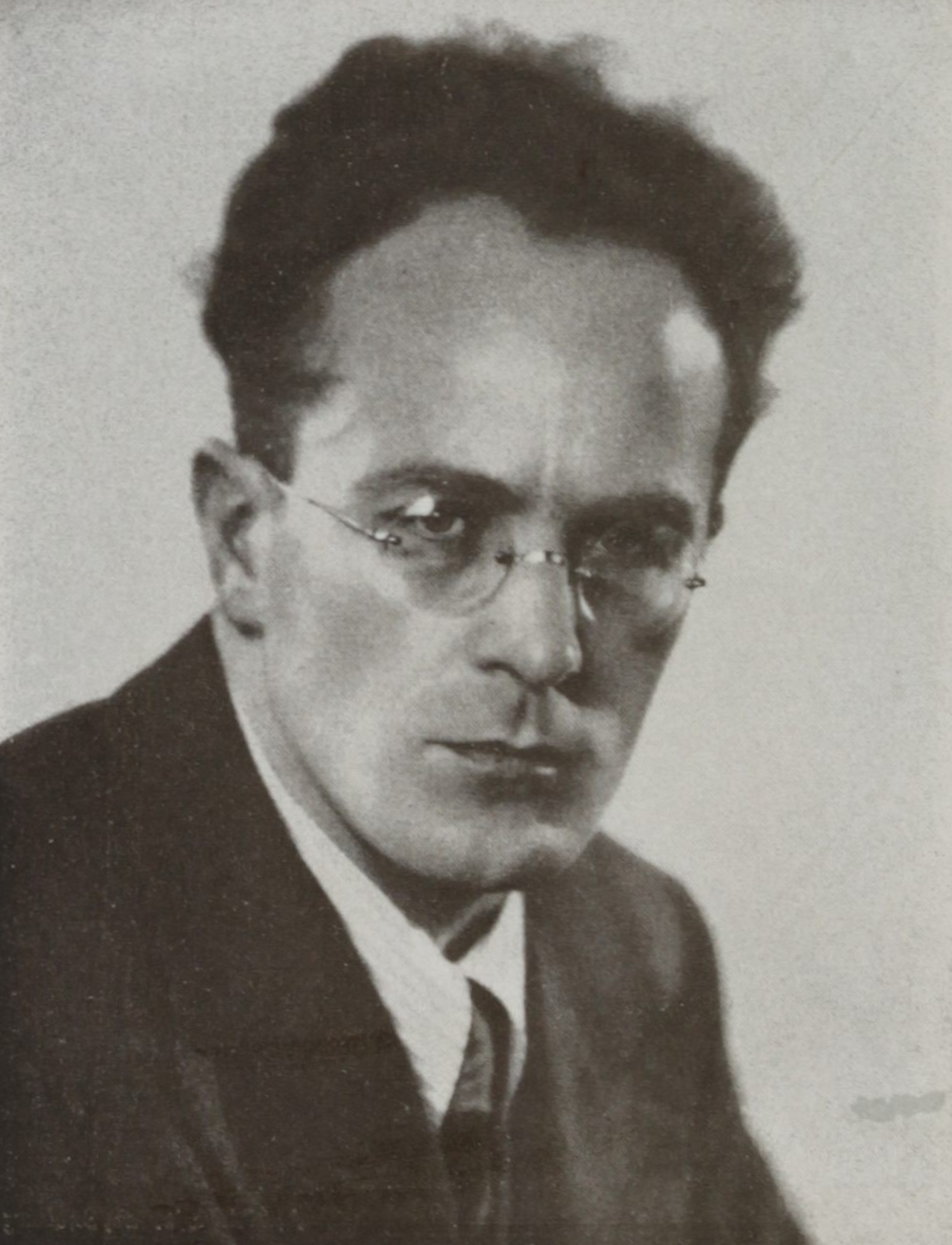
David before 1937

Johann Nepomuk David (30 November 1895 – 22 December 1977) was an Austrian composer.

== Life and career ==
David was born in Eferding. He was a choirboy in the monastery of Sankt Florian and studied at an episcopal teacher training college in Linz, 1912–1915, after which he became a school teacher. He studied briefly (1921–22) at both the Musikhochschule (where was a composition student of Joseph Marx) and the university of Vienna (where he studied with Guido Adler). He returned to Linz in 1922, where he acted as musical director of the Linz "Kunststelle" until 1924. From January 1925 until the autumn of 1934 he was a teacher at a local catholic school, founded and directed a Bach choir, and was organist at a Protestant church at Wels. He then became professor of composition and theory at the Musikhochschule in Leipzig (November 1934 – January 1945). From 1945 to 1947 he was professor of music at the Mozarteum, Salzburg, and finally, from 1948 to 1963, professor of theory and counterpoint (practically: composition) at the Musikhochschule in Stuttgart. At Stuttgart, he also directed the Bruckner choir (1949–52), the academy's chamber orchestra (1950–53).

David wrote a number of orchestral works including eight symphonies, several concertos including an organ concerto and three violin concertos, instrumental works including many for or with organ, and many choral works. His general style changed from the modal tendencies seen in his first two symphonies to the more acerbic though still tonal sound of the later ones.

David died, aged 83, in Stuttgart. His son, Thomas Christian David (1925–2006), was also a composer.

His pupils included Hans Georg Bertram (1936–2013), Seóirse Bodley (1933–2023), Johan Kvandal (1919–1999), Helmut Lachenmann (born 1935), Hans Stadlmair (1929–2019), Käte van Tricht (1909–1996), and Ruth Zechlin (1926–2007).

== Selected worklist ==
- Eight Symphonies:
  - No. 1 in A minor, op. 18 (1937)
  - No. 2, op. 20 (1938)
  - No. 3, op. 28 (1941)
  - No. 4, op. 39 (1948)
  - No. 5, op. 41 (1951)
  - No. 6, op. 46 (1954)
  - No. 7, op. 49 (1957)
  - No. 8, op. 59 (1964–65)
- Symphonie preclassica super nomen H-A-S-E (op. 44, 1953), sinfonia breve for small orchestra (op. 47) (1955), sinfonia per archi (op. 54) (1959)
- Chaconne, op. 71 for orchestra (1972)
- Flute Concerto, 1936
- Three concertos for string orchestra (op. 40 no. 1, 1950, op. 40 no. 2, 1951, op. 74, 1974, published by Breitkopf & Härtel)
- Violin concerto, op. 45 with small orchestra (1952)
- Violin concerto no. 2, with string orchestra, op. 50 (1957)
- Violin Concerto no. 3, op. 56 (1961)
- Melancholia for viola and chamber orchestra, op.53 (1958)
- Concerto for organ and orchestra, op. 61 (1965)
- Concerto for violin, cello and orchestra, op.68 (1969)
- Duo concertante for violin and cello (op. 19) (pub. 1938)
- Sonata for viola solo, op. 31 no.3 (1947)
- Two sonatas for cello solo (op. 31 no. 4, pub. 1947; 1977)
- Sonata for guitar (op. 31 no. 5)
- Sonata for flute and viola, op. 32 no.1 (1943)
- Sonata for clarinet and viola, op. 32 no.4 (1948)
- Sonatas for violin solo
  - no. 1
  - no. 2 op. 58 no. 1 (1963)
- Partita über B-A-C-H for organ (1964)
- Trio for flute, viola and guitar, op. 26
- Trio for flute, violin and cello, op. 73 (1974)
- Sonata for violin and organ, op. 75 (1975)
- Sonata for violoncello and organ (1975)
- Variations for flute or recorder and guitar op. 32
- Ezzolied, op. 51 (1957)
- Deutsche Messe for mixed choir, op. 42 (1952)
- Missa choralis (de angelis): ad quattuor voces inaequales, op. 43 (1953)
- Sechs Evangelienmotetten for mixed choir a cappella (1958)
  - 1. Der Pharisäer und der Zöllner (Lk 18:10–14)
  - 2. Lasset die Kindlein zu mir kommen (Mk 10:13–16)
  - 3. Die Ehebrecherin (Joh 8:3–11)
  - 4. Das Scherflein der Witwe (Mk 12:41–45)
  - 5. Der barmherzige Samariter (Lk 10:30–34)
  - 6. Die zwei Blinden (Matt 9:27–30)
- O Heiland, reiß die Himmel auf, motet on the Advent song "O Heiland, reiß die Himmel auf" (1959)
- Psalm 139 Herr, du erforschest mich, for mixed choir (1961)
- Pollio, for bass, choir and orchestra, text after Virgil

== Writings ==
- David, Johann Nepomuk (1968). Die Jupiter-Symphonie: eine Studie über die thematisch-melodischen Zusammenhänge (in German). Göttingen: Vandenhoeck & Ruprecht. OCLC 258753615.

== Decorations and awards ==
- 1941: Winner of the Upper Danube cultural Prize (NSDAP)
- 1949: Franz Liszt Prize (Weimar)
- 1951: City of Vienna Prize for Music
- 1951: Mendelssohn Scholarship (Leipzig)
- 1952: Buxtehudepreis (Lübeck)
- 1953: Grand Austrian State Prize for Music
- 1955: Mozart Medal (Mozartgemeinde Vienna)
- 1960: Guest at the Deutsche Akademie Rom Villa Massimo in Rome
- 1963: Bach Prize of the Free and Hanseatic City of Hamburg
- 1963: Anton Bruckner Prize (Linz)
- 1966: Austrian Decoration for Science and Art
- 1966: Mozart Prize of the Goethe Foundation in Basel by the University of Innsbruck
- 1966: Berlin Art Prize
- 1970: Honorary Doctor of the Protestant Theological Faculty of the University of Mainz

== See also ==
- List of Austrians in music
