= Anton Bruckner Private University =

Austrian private University for Music, Drama and Dance based in Linz

Coordinates: 48°18′56″N 14°17′07″E

- Anton Bruckner Privatuniversität
- Type: Private university
- Established: 1823
- Chairperson: Thomas Stelzer
- Rector: Martin Rummel
- Dean of Studies: Guido Baeh & Annette Lopez Leal
- Academic staff: 220+
- Administrative staff: 70
- Location: Linz, 4020, Austria
- Language: German & English (for dancing)
- Website: https://www.bruckneruni.ac.at/en

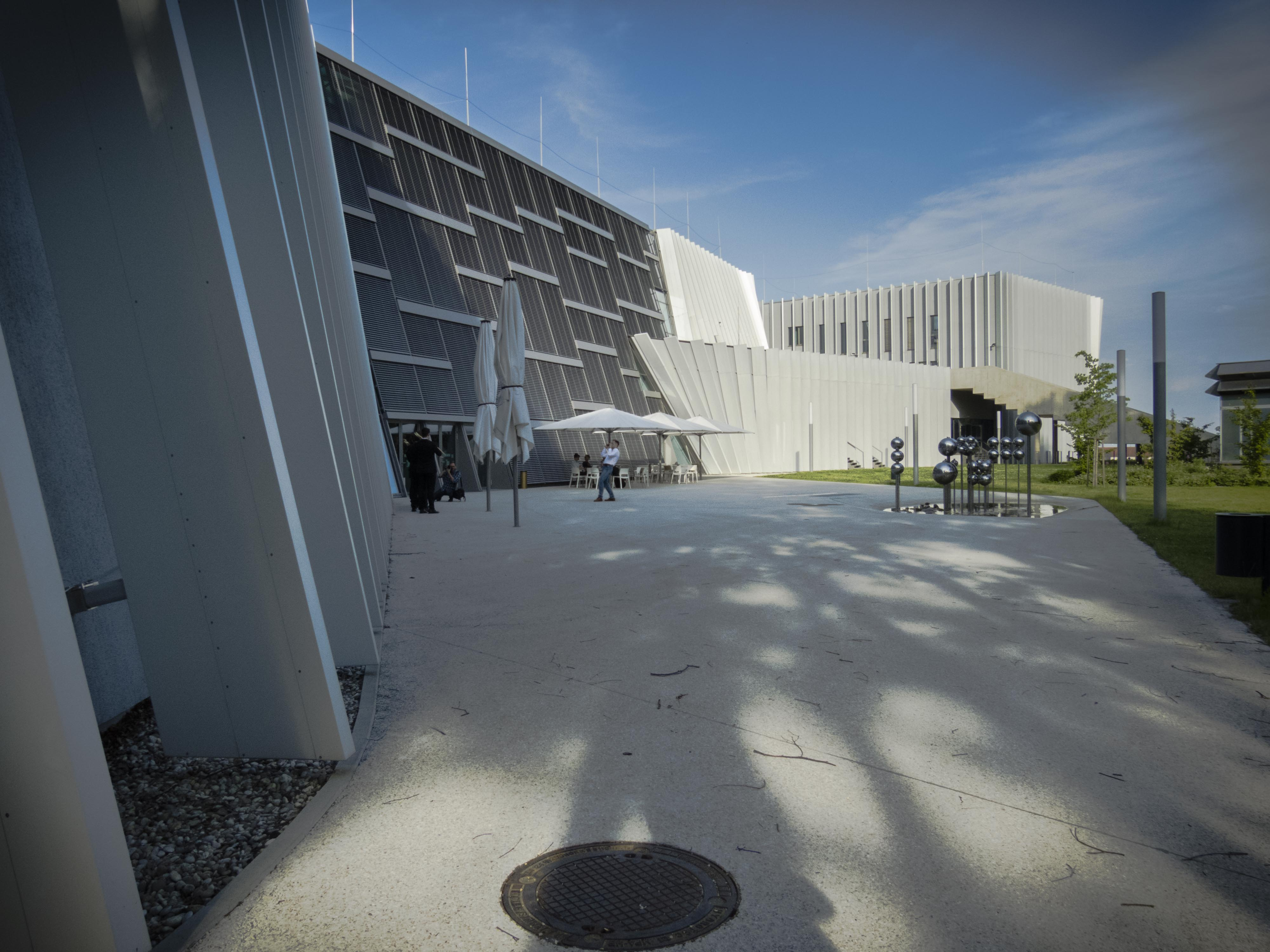
New building of Anton Bruckner Private University since 2015

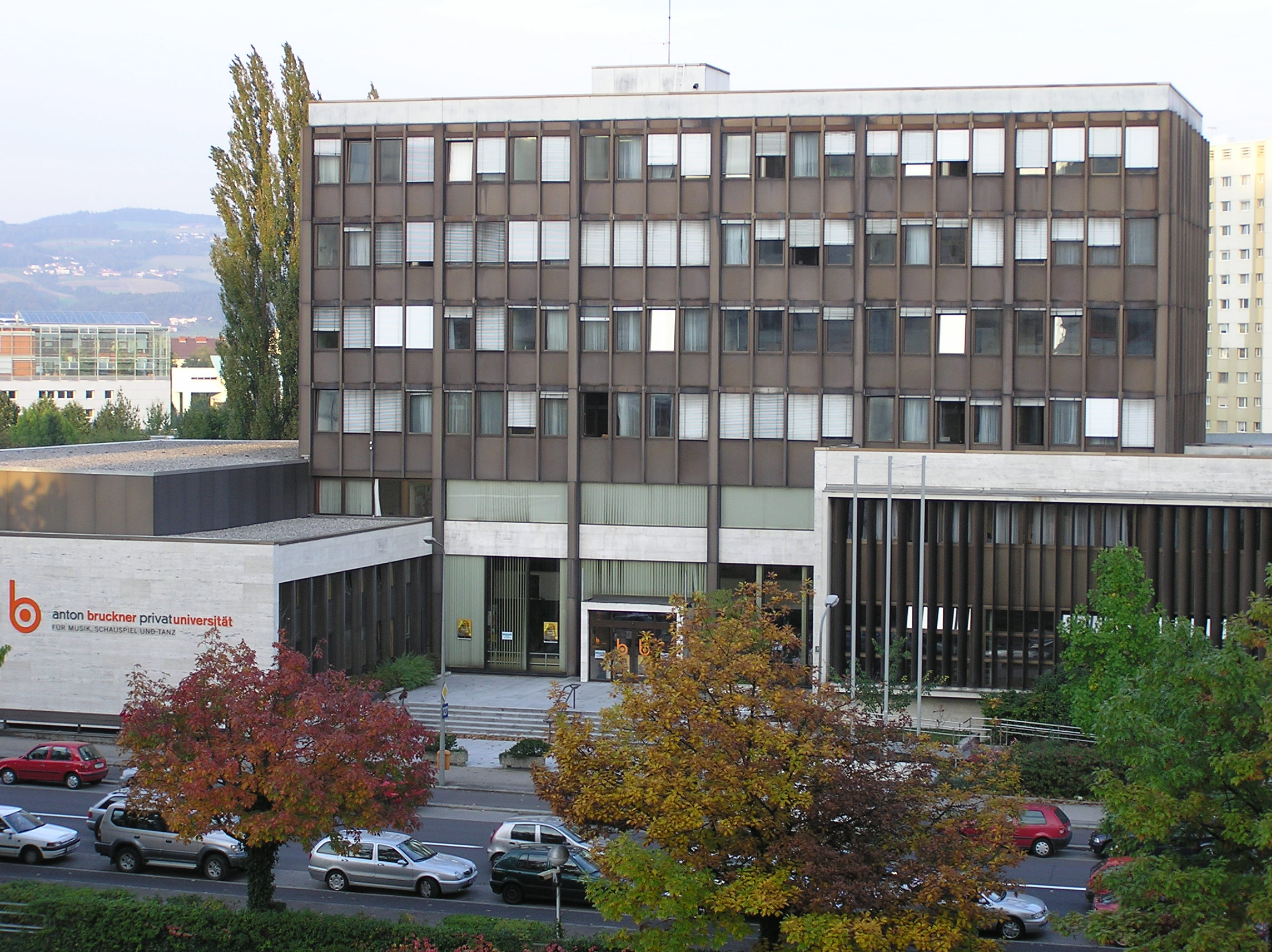
Old building of Anton Bruckner Private University

The Anton Bruckner Private University (in German Anton Bruckner Privatuniversität, common short form is Bruckner University) is one of five Austrian Universities for Music, Drama and Dance, and one of four universities in Linz, the European Capital of Culture 2009. Eight hundred and fifty students from all parts of the world study here. They are taught by 200 professors and teaching staff, who are internationally recognised artists, academics and teachers. More than 30% of the students and instructors come from abroad. The university was granted accredited private university status in 2004, as part of the Austrian Private Universities Conference (its name from 1932 to 2004 was Bruckner Conservatory Linz, but the roots of the institution go back to 1823 or even to 1799).

The Upper Austrian Provincial Government gives particular support to artistic education, which is why – compared with similar institutions – tuition fees here are moderate.

The university is named after the Austrian composer Anton Bruckner (1824–1896).

The ABPU is a university for music, drama and dance. The artistic work of the university is focussed on performing, pedagogy and research in each of these fields, with an equal emphasis on artistic communication, development and outreach.

== History ==
Even though the Anton Bruckner Private University has only been known under this name for a short time, musical education in Linz has a tradition stretching back more than 200 years. As early as 1799 the city musical director Franz Xaver Glöggl, a close friend of Michael Haydn, Mozart and Beethoven, founded the first music school in Linz. Then in 1823 the newly founded Linz Musical Society set up a singing school – the real precursor of the Anton Bruckner Private University.

The attempt to persuade Anton Bruckner to become director of the Music School in 1863 was unsuccessful. But another important name – the Bruckner biographer and former secretary to Franz Liszt, August Göllerich, - was in charge of the newly strengthened institute from 1896 to 1923. And in 1923 the name of Bruckner was finally established with the upgrading of the Music School to the Bruckner Conservatory Linz – now renamed the Anton Bruckner Private University.

The original main function of the forerunner institute, which was to raise the quality of musical life in Linz by improving the training of amateur musicians, was taken over by the Linz Music School in 1950. From that time on the Bruckner Conservatory established itself progressively as a training ground for professional musicians. This development was carried through by the directors Carl Steiner (1945–1958), Wilhelm Jerger (1958–1973), Gerhard Dallinger (1973–1990), Hans Maria Kneihs (1990–1995) und Reinhart von Gutzeit (from 1995 to 2006), Univ. Prof. Anton Voigt (acting rector from 2006 to 2007), and Dr. Marianne Betz (2007–2012). In autumn 2012 the rectorship of the university was taken over by Ursula Brandstätter.

The Anton Bruckner Private University now offers twenty two separate branches of study and three university courses in the fields of classical music, jazz, drama and contemporary dance. Students may study for the degrees Bachelor of Arts or Master of Arts, which are on a par with those of other European universities and Arts Academies.

== Computer music studio ==
The Computer Music Studio offers lectures and courses in the field of music and media technology, media composition and computer music, and the range of subjects it offers is closely integrated with those of the Institute DKM – Composition, Conducting and the Theory of Music – and JIM, the Institute for Jazz and improvised Music.

History:

The Computer Music Studio was founded in 1995 as the SAMT by DI Adelhard Roidinger and the Rector of the Bruckner Conservatory, Hans Maria Kneihs in the buildings of the Software Park Hagenberg. Since 2008 the University Studio, as it became, has been under the direction of Weixler, Andreas · Ao.Univ.Prof. Mag. At the same time an institute directive changed the name of the studio to the CMS -Computer Music Studio.

There are currently co-operations with and connections to the following institutions (among others):

Internally:

- Institute for Composition, Conducting and the Theory of Music (DKM)
- Institute for Jazz and improvised Music (JIM)
- Institute for Theatre and Drama (ACT)
- Institute for Keyboard instruments (TAS)

Regionally:

- AEC - Ars Electronic Center
- Art University of Linz
- InterfaceCulture
- JKU - Johannes Kepler University
- ElisabethInnen Hospital
- SCCH Software Park Hagenberg
- Klanglandschaften (Soundscapes), Musik der Jugend (Youth Music), Province of OÖ
- DorfTV
- Klavierhaus Merta

Nationally:

- ELAK - Institute for Composition and Electroacoustics, Vienna
- MDW - University for Music and Drama, Vienna
- Prima la Musica, Salzburg
- Bösendorfer

Internationally:

- JSEM - Japanese Society for Electro Acoustic Music
- TU Studio - Berlin
- SARC - Sonic Arts Research Center Belfast, Queens University, Northern Ireland
- UEA - University of East Anglia
- BEAST - Birmingham Electroacoustic Sound Theatre, University of Birmingham
- NOVARS - Manchester, UK
- Hope University Liverpool, UK
- Northeastern University, College of Arts, Media and Design, Boston/USA

== Sonic Lab ==
Sonic Lab is an intermedia computer music concert hall with a 24 audio channel surround dome and double video projection, initiated by Andreas Weixler.

== Erasmus ==
In the course of setting up the new generation programme Erasmus+ the ABPU was awarded the so-called Erasmus Charter in 2014.
