= ALEA Ensemble =

Austrian chamber music ensemble

- Chamber ensemble for contemporary music
- Founded: 1988
- Location: Graz
- Music director: Gerhard Präsent

ALEA Ensemble 2026

The ALEA Ensemble is a chamber music ensemble founded in 1988 in Graz for contemporary music, but also traditional repertoire, playing in variable formation including the ALEA Quartet.

== History ==
The ensemble was founded in 1988 by composer and conductor Gerhard Präsent and his wife, violinist Sigrid Präsent. The name is derived from the aleatoric composition style, but can also be applied for variable combination of instruments for different works, such as the ALEA Quartet. The ensemble performs contemporary music, frequently in combination with traditional repertory. They played and recorded the second and third string quartet by Iván Erőd, all four string quartets by Gerhard Präsent, and the complete string quartets plus additional chamber music by Herbert Blendinger.

The ALEA ensemble has performed at festivals in Austria, such as "Österreich heute" (Austria today) and "Hörgänge" (Paths of listening/hearing ducts) in the Wiener Konzerthaus, "Judenburger Musiksommer" in Judenburg, Carinthischer Sommer in Ossiach and styriarte. They have performed internationally at the festival "Nuovi Spazi Musicali" at the Forum Austriaco (Austrian Cultural Forum) in Rome, "Musik-Forum München" in Munich, the "Lutoslawski Festival" in Lublin, at the "Oaarwurm"-Festival in Berlin, at the Dublin National Concert Hall and at the Austrian Cultural Forum in Bratislava, New York City as well as London and Washington, D.C.

Their 2007 CD "Klassik meets Jazz" was reviewed in 2008 by Tim Homfray in "The Strad": "Berndt Luefs At Nightfall and La Carretera are attractive and elegantly played; his Sonntag in der Kleinstadt for violin and vibraphone has Sigrid Präsent enjoying herself. [...] Iván Eröd's solo-violin GeburtstagsPRÄSENT [(a birthday present to Gerhard Präsent)], played with assured simplicity by Sigrid is followed by his Third String Quartet of 2003. This is a powerful and concentrated work, which the ALEA plays with tonal intensity and rhythmic vitality. ... Gerhard Präsent's own Canzona op.50 for violin and cello has a similar expressive economy. Here cellist Christian Peyr joins Sigrid Präsent for a performance particularly notable for the plaintive dialogue of the beautiful third movement Aria."

Their performances have been broadcast by the ORF and by the Bayerischer Rundfunk. A concert at the Musik-Forum München, Studio für neue Musik (studio for new music) was played by Sigrid Präsent (violin), Tobias Stosiek (cello) and Rita Melem (piano), and moderated by Gerhard Präsent. The program included piano trios of Gerhard Präsent (Trio intricato), Herbert Blendinger (Fantasie in G), Graham Waterhouse (Bei Nacht) and Iván Erőd (Trio). It was broadcast on 19 August 2011 in the series "Concerto bavarese" (Bavarian concert).

From 1993 to 2009 the ensemble performed preferentially as string quartet (also with additional piano), from 2010 to today mostly as string trio (two violins, cello), also with possible piano. The present line-up consists of Sigrid Präsent and Igmar Jenner (violin) with Tobias Stosiek (cello), facultatively with Wolfgang Stangl (viola) and Rita Melem (piano).

== Recordings ==
- La Tâche ALEA-01-97, music of Iván Erőd, Gerhard Präsent, Herbert Blendinger, Jörg-Martin Willnauer, Mohamed Abdel-Fattah, 1997
- Sounds of Wood ALEA-02-99, seven works of Gerhard Präsent
- ALEA-Quartett STB 05/01 (2 CDs) with Barbara Payer (flute), music of Johann Teibenbacher, Gerhard Präsent, Maximilian Kreuz, Viktor Fortin, Herbert Blendinger, Franz Zebinger, Kurt Schwertsik, 2001
- ...der Welt abhanden gekommen STB 05/08, with Alexander Puhrer (baritone), music of Kurt Schwertsik, Georg Arányi-Aschner, Daniela Rusch, Iván Erőd, Gerhard Präsent, Gustav Mahler, including an arrangement of Mahler's Rückert-Lieder for piano quartett by Präsent, 2005
- ALEA-Ensemble STB 07/01, with Christine Kügerl (harp), music of Kurt Anton Hueber, Georg Arányi-Aschner, Viktor Fortin, Iván Erőd, Franz Zebinger, Gerhard Präsent, Maximilian Kreuz, Hannes Kuegerl, 2007
- Klassik meets Jazz STB 08/01, with Berndt Luef (vibraphone), music of Gerd Noack, Oliver Nelson, Berndt Luef, Iván Erőd, Hannes Kügerl, Gerhard Präsent among others, 2008
- Back from New York STB 08/07 (2 CDs) with Rita Melem (piano), music of Herbert Blendinger, Anselm Schaufler, Christoph Smola, Gerhard Präsent, Franz Zebinger, Charris Efthimiou, Iván Erőd, George Gershwin/Gerhard Präsent, 2008
- ALEA Live 2009 STB 09/07 with Edda König (piano), music of Iván Erőd, Viktor Fortin, Rudolf Hinterdorfer, Franz Zebinger, Herbert Blendinger, Georg Arányi-Aschner, Gerhard Präsent, 2009
- ALEA String Action STB 11/02 music of Georg Winkler, Henrik Sande, Igmar Jenner, Franz Zebinger, Gerhard Präsent, Renaud Garcia-Fons, Iván Erőd, 2011
- Gerhard PRAESENT - String Music ALEA-03-11, music of Gerhard Präsent: string quartetts No. 2-4, "Canzona op.50" for vl&vc, "Four Dances for Two Violins", 2011
- ALEA - Intricato STB 12/02 with Sigrid Präsent and Igmar Jenner (violin), Delphine Krenn-Viard (viola), Tobias Stosiek (violoncello) and Rita Melem (piano), music of Graham Waterhouse, Viktor Fortin, Dieter Zenz, Igmar Jenner, Wolfram Wagner, Herbert Blendinger, Charris Efthimiou and Gerhard Präsent, 2012
- Live String Action 2011 ALEA-04-12 with ALEA-Ensemble Sigrid Präsent und Igmar Jenner (violin), Tobias Stosiek (violoncello), music of Antonio Vivaldi, Johann Sebastian Bach, Joseph Haydn, Franz Zebinger, Gerhard Präsent, Antonín Dvořák, Igmar Jenner, Renaud Garcia-Fons and Iván Erőd, 2012
- BIG BEN - Back from London STB 13/01, ALEA with Edda König (piano), music of Kurt Anton Hueber, Charris Efthimiou, Georg Arányi-Aschner, Karl Haidmayer, Gerhard Präsent, Michele Trenti, Herbert Blendinger and Igmar Jenner, 2013
- 1 – 2 – 3 Soli, Duos, Trios STB 13/10, music of Erik Satie/Gerhard Präsent, Jenő Takács, Georg Arányi-Aschner, Viktor Fortin, Gerhard Präsent, Berndt Luef, Igmar Jenner and Wolfram Wagner, 2014
- Extravaganza STB 14/02 with Sigrid Präsent and Igmar Jenner (violin), Tobias Stosiek (violoncello) and Eduard Lanner(piano), music of Michael Wahlmüller, Henrik Sande, Wolfram Wagner, Georg Arányi-Aschner, Gerd Noack, Michele Trenti, Iván Erőd and Gerhard Präsent, 2014
- Big Apple STB 15/01 with Sigrid Präsent and Igmar Jenner (violin), Wolfgang Stangl (viola), Tobias Stosiek (violoncello) and Bernhard Riedler (piano), music of Bernhard Riedler, Walter Vaterl, Georg Arányi-Aschner, Franz Zebinger, Gerd Noack, Michele Trenti, Wolfram Wagner, Patrick Hahn and Gerhard Präsent, 2015
