= Gerhard Präsent =

Austrian composer, conductor and academic teacher

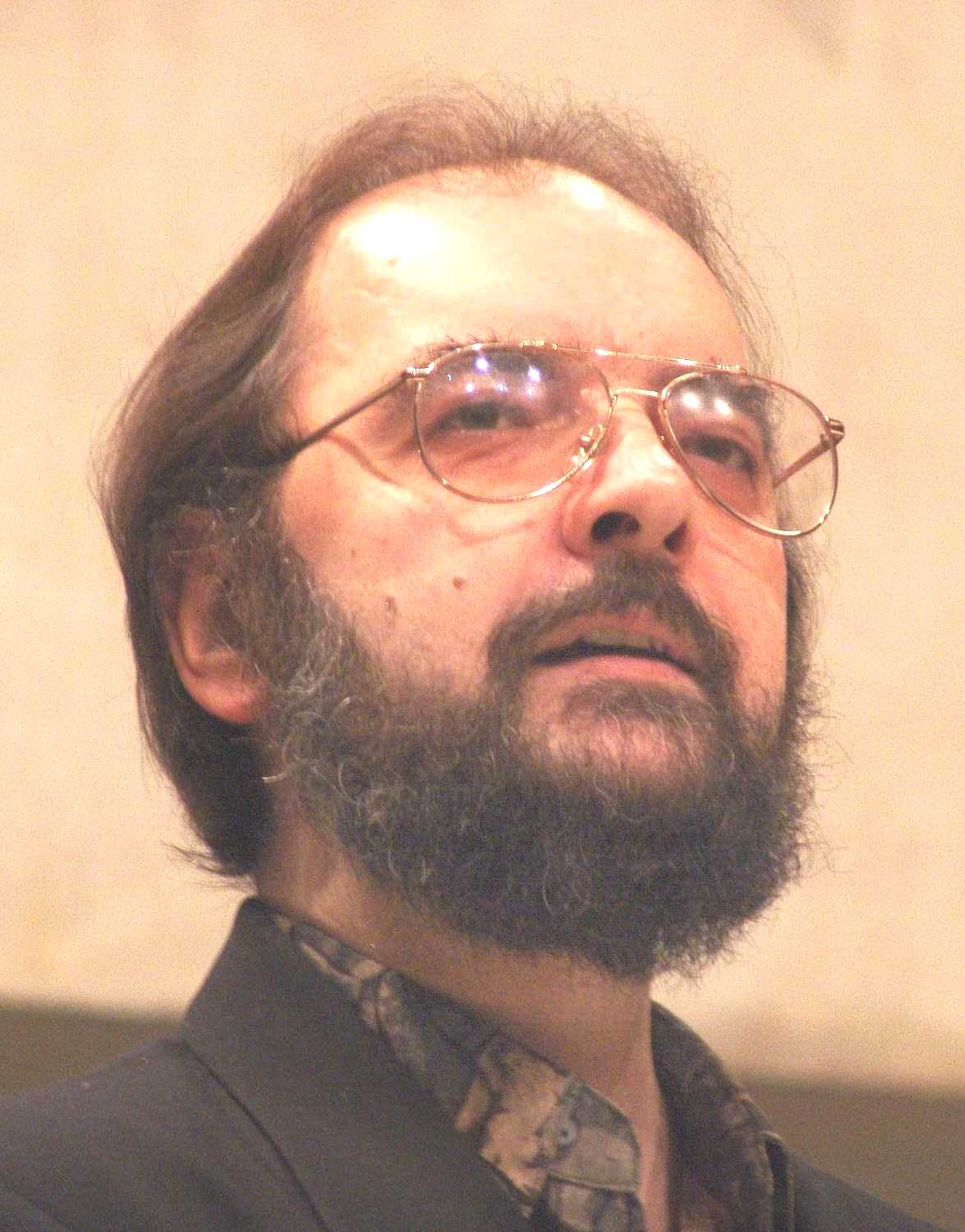
- Born: 21 June 1957 (age 69); Graz
- Education: Musikhochschule Graz
- Occupations: Composer; Conductor; Academic teacher
- Organizations: Universität für Musik und darstellende Kunst Graz; ALEA Ensemble; Steirischer Tonkünstlerbund

Gerhard Präsent (born 21 June 1957) is an Austrian composer, conductor and academic teacher.

== Professional career ==
Born in Graz, Präsent studied from 1976 at the Musikhochschule Graz, composition with Iván Erőd and conducting with Milan Horvat. He graduated in 1982 in composition and in 1985 in conducting, in both subjects with distinction. He also studied jazz theory with Dieter Glawischnig. He then taught at the institute. Until 1999 he held a composers' workshop, responsible for 48 concert programs. From 1986 to 1992 he was an assistant to Erőd, and also to Horvat for the orchestra. In 1992 he was appointed professor for music theory, musical form, analysis, conducting, and chamber music for strings.

In 1988 Präsent founded the ALEA Ensemble, an ensemble for contemporary music, and has been its artistic director. He was vice president of the Steirischer Tonkünstlerbund (Styrian Tone Arts Association) from 2003 and has been its president since 2005.

He is married to the violinist Sigrid Präsent, the first violinist of the ALEA Ensemble.

== Important performances ==
Präsent's works have been performed more than 1300 times in more than 25 countries worldwide – including five times at the International Society for Contemporary Music World New Music Days:

- 1982 in Graz in the festival Steirischer Herbst (Styrian Autumn) with "Configurations" for piano and orchestra
- 2002 in Hongkong with "Marcia funebre" for chamber ensemble
- 2023 in Johannesburg/South Africa with "...para tocar" for a percussion player
- 2024 in the Faroe Islands with "B-Suite" for jazz quartet
- 2026 in Bucharest/Romania with "A Vampire Story"(new title)

Moreover, in the „Music Forum Munich“, „Nuovi Spazi musicali“ in Rome, „Witold Lutosławski-Festival“ in Lublin/Poland, in the Austrian Cultural Forum and in the Carnegie Hall (Recital Hall) in New York, in the Graham-Gallery in Washington D.C. as well as in the Altavista Tower/Arlington/USA; in the Gesellschaft der Musikfreunde and in the Konzerthaus, Vienna, in the festival Carinthischer Sommer (Carythian Summer), at the festival 2Aspects salzburg“, in the festival Styriarte in Graz and in the concert series „Alte Schmiede“Vienna, „die andere saite“ „Styrian Tone Arts Association“ in Graz. Many broadcasts of his works in Austria, Bavaria, Poland, Hong Kong and Austria – and numerous commissions, e.g. by „Austro mechana“, Gesellschaft der Musikfreunde, Austrian Cultural Forum New York and London, „Ensemble Kontrapunkte“, „Creative Center Vienna“, „Ambitus“ and „Vienna Art Trio“.

== Selected works ==
Präsent has composed mostly instrumental music, both chamber music and for orchestra, concertos with orchestra as well as songs and sacred choral music.

Instrumental Trio intricato for piano trio (1983–1985) was performed and recorded in Munich by the Bayerischer Rundfunk on 2 May 2011. Himmelslicht (Heavenly Light), a concerto for trumpet, brass and percussion (1986–1987), was premiered at the festival steirischer herbst in 1987. Marcia funebre for chamber ensemble (1992) was first performed at the World Music Days 2002 of the International Society for Contemporary Music in Hong Kong. In 1996 Präsent honoured his teacher, composing Erödiana (Capriccio Erödico) for bassoon (or cello) and piano. The Gesellschaft der Musikfreunde in Wien (Society of the friends of music in Vienna) commissioned Chaconne for 14 instruments (1996) and performed it in the Wiener Musikverein in 1997. Partita sagrada op. 60 for chamber orchestra (2009) on a commission of the ensemble Kontrapunkte was premiered at the Musikverein on 6 December 2010, played by the ensemble conducted by Peter Keuschnig.

Vocal Präsent wrote Lieder aus der Hütte (Songs From the Hut) for soprano, flute, oboe, viola and cello in 1979 on five texts of Martin Krusche. He composed Missa minima for four parts a cappella in 2001. Commissioned by the Steirischer Sängerbund (Styrian Choir Association), he wrote a Pater noster “ for four parts a cappella, first performed in 2007 at Styria Cantat I, and Psalm LXI for "Styria Cantat IV" in 2010.

Orchestra

- „Symphonic Fragment (Half Symphony)“ (XXVI:1991/1992), Austrian encouragement award 1992
- „Scherzo – ma non troppo scherzando“ (XXV:1991), WP Vienna Concert Hall 1994
- „Hermitage“ – Concerto for Small Orchestra (XXVIII:1992/1993), commissioned by the Austrian Chamber symphony for the Vienna Concert Hall 1993
- „Configurations – Three States for Piano And Orchestra“ (piano concerto) – (XI:1981/1982), WP ISCM-World Music Festival in the festival „Steirischer Herbst“ 1982 in Graz
- „Song“ for high soprano and small orchestra (IX:1981) – English lyrics by the composer
- „Heavens Light“ – concerto for trumpet and orchestra (XXIb:1986–2007) – WP Steirischer Herbst/Krieglach 1987 with brass and percussion, orchestral version 2007
- „Music for big band and orchestra“ (VIII:1980) – WP International Week Graz 1981
- „Violin Concerto“ (op.73:2015) – dedicated to and premiered by his wife Sigrid Präsent in Graz and Zagreb
- „Danse fatale“ for cello and orchestra (op.75:2017/18)
- „Escenas estirias“ – Concerto for saxophone and orchestra (op.80:2019-23)

Chamber orchestra

- „La Tâche“ for string orchestra (XXXIb:1995) – Franz-Joseph-Reinl-Award 1996
- „Chaconne“ for fourteen instruments“ (XXXIII:1996/1997) – Commissioned by the „Gesellschaft der Musikfreunde“ Vienna, WP Gesellschaft der Musikfreunde in Wien, 1997
- „Partita sagrada op. 60“ for chamber orchestra (LX:2009/2010) – commissioned by the Ensemble Kontrapunkte, WP Gesellschaft der Musikfreunde in Wien, 2010
- „Marcia funebre“ for chamber ensemble (XXVII:1992/rev. 1997) – WP ISCM-World Music Festival 2002 in Hong Kong

Solo works

- „Solo“ for a woodwind player (fl, ob, cl, sax, bsn ad lib.) (VI:1979), Doblinger/Vienna
- „The long run“ – improvisations for instrument and tape (XII:1982–1983/1995)
- „Sonata regina per S. F.“ for violin solo (XXII:1987)
- „A Rayas“ for violoncello solo (XLIII:2001/2002)
- „To Be“ for violoncello solo (op. 85:2023)
- „Profondo“ for double bass (and piano ad lib.) (XVII:1985/1986)
- „Toccata“ for piano (XVI:1985/1986)
- „Bagatelle (avant et après)“ and "Bagatelle #2 (hier et demain)" for piano (LXIII:2011)
- „Encore Piece“ for accordion solo (or piano solo) and audience (XXXIV:1997)
- „Three Dedications“ for piano solo (op.81:2019) – to Karlheinz Roschitz, Gerd Kühr, Iván Eröd
- „Dies Irae“ for organ (LII:2006) – also version for violin and organ (2013)
- „Praeludium and Toccata“ for guitar solo (XVII:1985/1986)
- „...para toccar“ for a percussion player (op.83: 2021) – premiered at the International Society for Contemporary Music World New Music Days 2023 in South Africa

Strings

- „Canzona op. 50“ for violin and violoncello (L:2004)
- „Four Dances for Two Violins“ (XXIV:1989/1990)
- „Sounds Of Wood“ (The Makers) – trio for vl, vla, vc (XXXVII:1998)
- „La Tâche“ – 2nd string quartet (XXXIa:1994/1995) – also version for string orchestra (1995)
- „Missa“ for string quartet (XLII:2001)
- „Big Apple“ – 4th string quartet (LVII:2008)
- „Big Ben“ for string trio (LXVI:2012)
- „Tres Dados“ for string trio (op. 69:2013-15)
- „A-Suite“ for string trio (op. 78:2018)
- „Sonata del Gesù“ for violin and piano (XXXV:1997–1999), Theodor-Körner-Preis 1997
- „Rondino“ for violin and piano (IV:1978/1979)
- „Sonatina Gemella“ for violin and piano (XIX:1986)
- „Arietta ritmica“ for violine (viola) and piano (XV:1984)
- „Three Miniatures“ for violine and piano (op.79:2024)
- „Sonata al dente“ for violoncello and piano in one movement (XXIII:1988–1990)
- „Trio intricato“ for violin, violoncello and piano (XIV:1983–1985)
- „Tête-à-tête-à-tête“ for violin, violoncello and piano (or accordion) (2nd trio – XXXb:1995/1998)
- „Four Melodic Pieces“ for violin, violoncello and piano (3rd trio – XLVII:2004)
- „Extravaganza“ for violin, violoncello and piano – 4th trio (LXVII:2012/13)
- „Five Miniatures“ for violin, violoncello and piano – 5th trio (op.88:2024)
- „What's Up, Amadeus“ for violin and accordion (op.84:2021)

Winds / mixed

- „Heavens Light“ – concerto for trumpet, brass and percussion (XXIa:1986–1987) – WP Steirischer Herbst/Krieglach 1987
- „PEGAU“ and „Petite Symphonie du Pégaü“ resp. for wind orchestra and wind quartet resp., various versions (XXXIXd:2000/2004)
- „Rhapsody“ for brass quintet (LVIII:2008)
- „Fanfare“ for brass ensemble or brass quintet (VII:1980/1999)
- „Two Fanfares“ for saxophone quartet (LXVIII:2013)
- „Anthem“ for four trumpets (or four horns/Trombones) (op.77: 2018)
- „Quintet“ for fl, ob, cl, hn & bsn (X:1981)
- „Hard Rock“ for five clarinet instruments (incl. bhn und bcl) (XXXVIII:1999/2000)
- „Marcia funebre“ – version for quintet: fl, cl, pn, vl, vc (XXVIIb:1992/1997)
- „Extravaganza“ for tp, tbn & pn (LXVII:2012)
- „Arietta ritmica“ for melodic instrument (rec, fl, cl, tp) and piano (XV:1984), Doblinger Vienna
- „Erödiana (Capriccio Erödico)“ for bassoon (violoncello) and piano (XXXII:1996)
- „Twin's Suite“ for flute (rec, vl) and guitar (XVIb:1985)
- „AGORO“ for percussion ensemble (3 different versions) (op.64: 2011/14/21)
- „B-Suite“ for jazz quartet (ss, vb, bs, dr) (op.79: 2018/19) - performed at the International Society for Contemporary Music World New Music Days 2024 in the Faroe Islands

Songs

- „Five Melodies“ (English, German, French lyrics) for voice solo (XXIX:1993/1994)
- „Half-Dark Songs“ for middle voice and piano quartet (words by Gerhard Präsent, David Präsent) (IL:2004), versions for high voice/middle voice and piano (ILb/c: 2004)
- „Liquid Time“ (Flüssige Zeit) – three Haikus for sopran and piano (op.87: 2024)
- „Two Humerous Songs“ for middle voice and piano (op.87B: 2024)
- „Song“ for soprano, violine and piano (IXb:1981/1990), English lyrics by the composer, originally for soprano and small orchestra
- „Songs From the Hut“ for soprano, fl, ob, vla & vc, words by Martin Krusche (V:1979)

Choral Works

- „Phantasy on a Bach-Choral“ („Wer nur den lieben Gott lässt walten“) for four-part choir a cappella (and organ ad lib.), (XX:1986/1987)
- „Missa minima“ for four voices a cappella (XLI:2001), commissioned by „Ambitus“
- „Pater noster“ for one or four voices a cappella (LIV:2006), commissioned by the „Steirischer Sängerbund“ for Styria cantat I
- „Psalm“ fur three upper voices and baritone (LXI:2010), commissioned by the „Steirischer Sängerbund“ for Styria cantat IV
- „Oh Tannenbaum, du trägst ein´ grünen Zweig“ for four-part mixed choir (XLb:2001)
- „s´Geld“ for four-part mixed choir a cappella, after Johann Nestroy (XLa:2001)
- „Fine Sign“ for four-part mixed choir a cappella, (LIX:2009), commissioned by the „Steirischer Sängerbund“ for „Volkslied im neuen Kleid“
- „Eine Vampir-Story“ (A Vampire-Story) for six-part upper choir a cappella (LXII:2011), commissioned by the „Singakademie Graz-Liebenau“, performed at the International Society for Contemporary Music World New Music Days 2026 in Bucharest
- „Old Songs“ for 3-4 part choir (op.82:2022)

Arrangements

- Nikolai Rimsky-Korsakov Concerto for trombone – arranged for trombone and Orchestra (Vb:1979) – (originally trombone and wind orchestra)
- Antonio Salieri „De Profundis“ (Psalm) – arranged for choir and small orchestra (XIIIb:1983) – (originally choir and organ)
- „Rückert-Lieder“ by Gustav Mahler, version for middle voice (baritone, mezzo) and piano quartet (XLIVa-e: 2002/2003)
- „Songs of a Wayfarer“ by Gustav Mahler, version for middle voice (baritone, mezzo) and piano quartet (op.74: 2017)
- „Kindertotenlieder“ (Songs on the Death of Children) by Gustav Mahler, version for middle voice (baritone, mezzo) and piano quartet (op.86: in work, unfinished)
- „John Dowland“ Three Songs, arranged for middle voice (baritone, mezzo), violin, cello and piano (op.76: 2018)
- Franz Schubert: „Gesänge des Harfners“ from „Wilhelm Meister“ (Goethe) DV 478–480 – version for baritone and piano quartet (XLVIII:2003/2004)
- „Fantasy Quartet“ in D for string quartet (LVa:2007/2008), after piano pieces by W. A. Mozart: 1. Fantasie KV 397, 2. Menuett KV 355, 3. Adagio KV 540, 4. Rondo KV 485
- Wolfgang Amadeus Mozart: „Trios“ in G-Major and Bb-Major resp. for two violins and violoncello, after the Duos KV 423 and 424 (LXVf-g:2012-13)
- Franz Schubert: „Trio“ in B-Major D 471, version for two violins and violoncello(LXVb:2012)
- Ludwig van Beethoven: Rage Over a Lost Penny op.129, arranged for two violins and violoncello (op.65j:2019)
- "Le Tango (perpétuel" (Erik Satie) for two violins and violoncello (LXVe:2012)
- „Prelude No.2“ by George Gershwin – arrangement for piano quintet (Xb:1981) – also for piano quartet, and flute, violin, cello & piano resp.
- „Three Choral Preludes and Aria“ by Johann Sebastian Bach, completed and arranged for string quartet (XLVId:2003/2005): 1. Jesu, meine Freude BWV 753, 2. Wer nur den lieben Gott läßt walten BWV 691, 3. Jesu, meine Zuversicht BWV 728, 4. Aria: Bist du bei mir BWV 508 – also version for string trio
- „Nächtlicher Umtrieb“ by Iván Erőd from „Crocodile Songs“ (words: Richard Bletschacher), arranged for baritone and piano quartet (LIb:2005)
- „Cinq Chansons cryptiques“ by Kurt Schwertsik after words by Erik Satie op. 50 (1985), a notated interpretation for middle voice and piano quartet (LId:2005)
- „The Soldier's Tale “ by Igor Stravinsky – version for actor (incl. percussion), clarinet, violin and piano, a completion of the original suite by the composer (XXXIX/2:2000) (not yet published due to copyright reasons)
- Béla Bartók: „Rumaenian Folk Dances“ – version for string quartet (LVb:2005/2006) (due to copyright reasons published only in 2015)
- „Zerline ERFURT-Edition“ – Complete Edition: revision and publication of all 48 works of the composer (1907–1990) from the manuscripts - for violin and piano, violin solo, piano solo, cello with piano and one song, resp. (2004–2016)

== Recordings/CDs ==
A great number of recordings of Präsent's works have been published on the CD-series (185 CDs) of the „Styrian Tone Arts Association“ as well as on other CDs and LPs. Moreover, several compositions are to be found in the archives of the ORF (Austrian Radio)
