= Bei Nacht =

Piano trio by Graham Waterhouse

- Piano trio by Graham Waterhouse
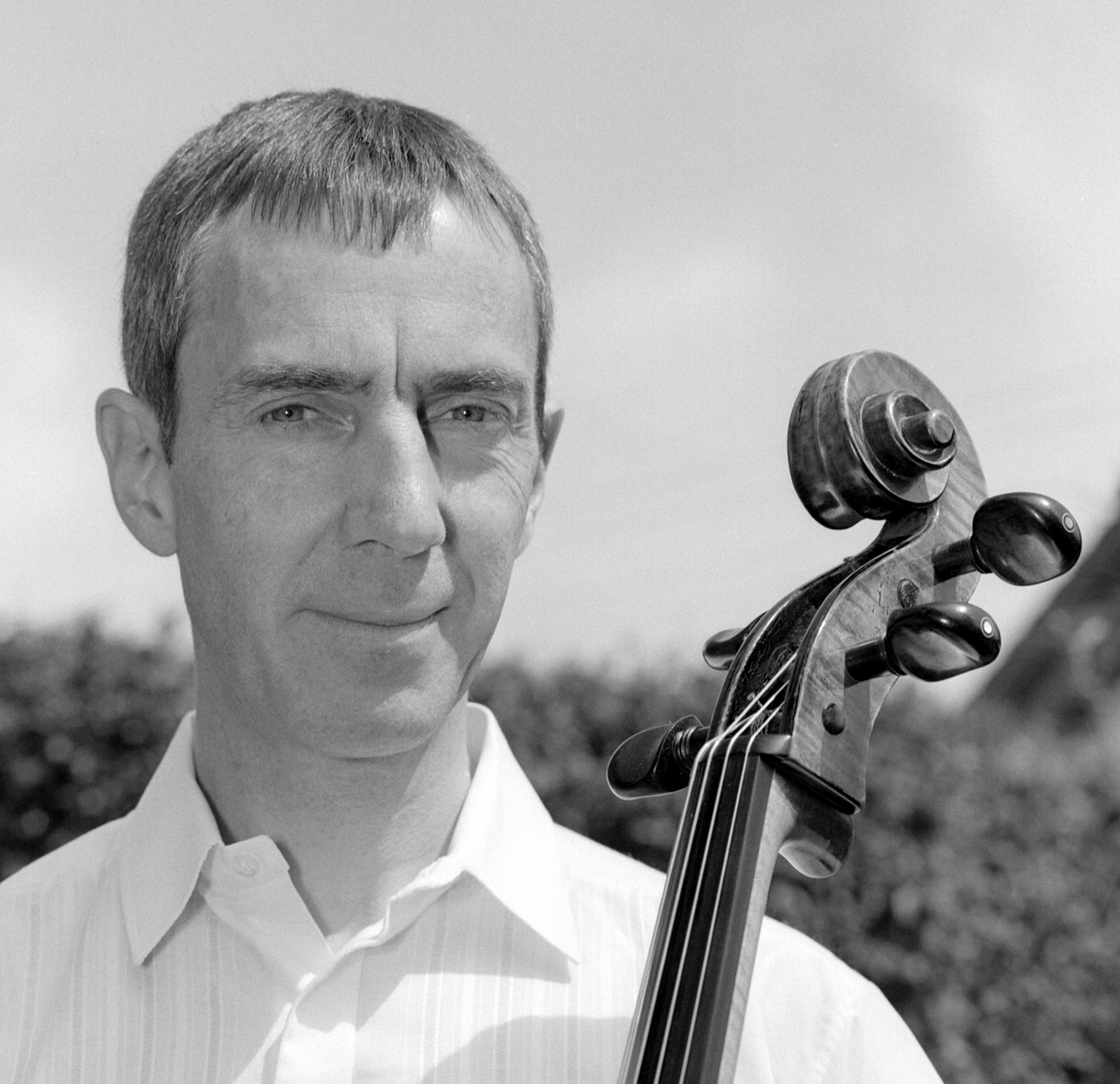
- The composer in 2011
- English: At Night
- Opus: 50
- Year: 1999
- Period: contemporary
- Published: 2001: Leipzig Hofmeister
- Movements: 1
- Scoring: piano, violin, cello
- www.arbc.de/Waterhouse/beinacht.htm

Bei Nacht (At Night), op. 50, is a piano trio, composed in 1999 by Graham Waterhouse, published by Hofmeister, Leipzig.

== Composition ==
Bei Nacht was written in 1999 for the Kandinsky Trio of Illinois to be performed at the University of Illinois. The composition was inspired by an oil painting of Wassily Kandinsky and also relates to a poem by Hermann Hesse, "Bei Nacht" (At Night on the High Seas, 1911), which begins: "Nachts, wenn das Meer mich wiegt und bleicher Sternenglanz auf seinen weiten Wellen liegt" (At night, when the sea rocks me and pale glow of the stars lies on its wide waves). The work is in one movement, a performance takes about 10 minutes. The tempo markings are: Allegro moderato – Più mosso – Tempo I – Tranquillo – Tempo I – Allegro molto – Tempo I – Tranquillo. The composer comments:

"Around the time of composition was a Kandinsky Retrospective at the Royal Academy in London. Amongst the exhibits was a particularly striking, early oil painting entitled "Nacht", which looked more akin to the work of Cézanne or of the French impressionists and quite unlike those works of Kandinsky's later style. In this painting concentric circles spread outwards from a darkly morbid moon, like ever widening circular ripples on a pond. Against this seemed to be apparitions of dancing figures. Visual stimuli play only a minor role in my works, yet the mysterious salubriousness of the painting captured the imagination. The vividly depicted circles found expression in a recurring "ground bass", underpinning a gradual crescendo in texture and intensity; the spectral dancers were alluded to in an irregular, agitato passage in 5/8. At the climax of the piece these two elements combine; the welter of sound is abruptly broken off, however, and it is in the subdued atmosphere of the opening that the work concludes."

The trio was first performed in the United Kingdom at the New Recital Room of the University of Cambridge on 19 February 2008 by the Waterhouse Piano Trio, Irina Puryshinskaja (piano), Boris Kucharsky (violin) and the composer (cello), together with works of Mozart, Schubert and Hugh Wood's piano trio, op. 24 (1982–84). The composer was then a "Musician By-Fellow" at Churchill College and also performed his Cello Concerto as part of the Lent Term Choral Concert on 9 February 2008 with "The Orchestra on the Hill" in a concert which also included Beethoven's Egmont Overture, Elgar's Serenade for Strings and Bernstein's Chichester Psalms. The Waterhouse Piano Trio had performed before Bei Nacht (2005) and Wood's trio (2007) in Munich at the Gasteig. The first concert also included Beethoven's Piano Trio No. 5 ("Ghost") and Shostakovich's Piano Trio No. 2. Wood's work appeared together with Schubert's Piano Trio No. 1.

On 5 May 2011 Bei Nacht was performed by the ALEA Ensemble at the Musik-Forum München, Studio für neue Musik (studio for new music), together with chamber music of Gerhard Präsent (Trio intricato), Herbert Blendinger (Fantasie in G) and Iván Erőd (Trio). It was played by Sigrid Präsent (violin), Tobias Stosiek (cello) and Rita Melem (piano), Gerhard Präsent, the founder of the ensemble, moderated the concert. The Bayerischer Rundfunk broadcast the concert on 19 August 2011 in its series after midnight "Concerto bavarese" (Bavarian concert).

== Publication and recording ==
Bei Nacht was published in 2001 by Hofmeister, Leipzig, which also published the composer's Cello Concerto, Celtic Voices and Hale Bopp and Gestural Variations, among others. Bei Nacht op. 50 für Violine, Violoncello und Klavier is dedicated to the Kandinsky Trio.

Bei Nacht is part of a CD Skylla und Charybdis of the composer's works for piano and strings. It was released in 2020 by Farao Classics. A reviewer in Das Orchester noted that the composer created a "notturno" atmosphere by beginning with fragile threads of sound ("Klangfäden") that gradually grow to melodies.
