= Chamber Concerto =

Chamber Concerto or Kammerkonzert may refer to any chamber concerto, including:

- Chamber Concerto (Adams), by Samuel Adams (1985)
- Kammerkonzert, by Alban Berg (1923–25)
- Kammerkonzert, by Karl Amadeus Hartmann (1930–35)
- Kammerkonzert, by Hans Werner Henze (1946)
- Chamber Concerto nos.1-3: Adrift (2008); Phantasy Caprices (2009); Storyteller (2011), by Peter Seabourne
- Chamber Concerto (Ligeti), by György Ligeti (1969–70)
- Kammerkonzert, by Squarepusher (2026)

== See also ==
- Concerto da camera
