= Herbert Blendinger =

Austrian composer and violist (1936–2020)

- Born: 3 January 1936; Ansbach
- Died: 15 May 2020 (aged 84)
- Education: Musikhochschule München
- Occupations: Composer; Violist; Academic teacher
- Organizations: Richard Strauss Conservatory; Hochschule für Musik Würzburg; Universität für Musik und darstellende Kunst Graz

Herbert Blendinger (3 January 1936 - 15 May 2020) was an Austrian composer and viola player of German origin.

== Career ==
Born in Ansbach, Blendinger studied viola and composition with Willy Horwath and Max Gebhard at the conservatory in Nuremberg, then from 1961 to 1963 at the Musikhochschule München with Georg Schmid and Franz Xaver Lehner. As a composer, he was inspired also by Paul Hindemith.

He worked from 1961 as principal viola player of the Rheinisches Kammerorchester in Cologne. He was also a member of the Bamberger Symphoniker and the Bayerisches Staatsorchester. He played chamber music with the Bamberger Klavierquartett and the Sinnhoffer-Quartett, among others. Blendinger taught at the Richard Strauss Conservatory in Munich and the Hochschule für Musik Würzburg. From 1981 until his retirement in 1988 he was professor for viola at the Universität für Musik und darstellende Kunst Graz. Blendinger was a member of the board of the Styrian Tone Arts Association.

== Performances ==
Blendinger's works were performed by the Bayerisches Staatsorchester and Wolfgang Sawallisch, his concerto for string quartet and orchestra in 1976, the cantata Media in vita (In the Midst of Life) in 1980 and Divertimento concertante in 1985. His cantatas Mich ruft zuweilen eine Stille (Sometimes a silence calls me), op. 58 (1992), and Allein den Betern kann es noch gelingen (It can only be achieved by those who pray) (1995) were premiered in the cathedral of Graz and the Heilandskirche, Graz. The ALEA Ensemble performed his string quartets internationally in Munich, Rome and New York. The ensemble, in piano trio formation, performed his Drei Stücke for cello and piano (1955), Duo concertante for violin and piano (2003) and Fantasie in G for piano trio (1992) at the Musik-Forum München, Studio für neue Musik, along with piano trios by Gerhard Präsent, Graham Waterhouse (Bei Nacht) and Iván Erőd. The concert was broadcast by the Bayerischer Rundfunk on 19 August 2011 in its series past midnight "Concerto bavarese" (Bavarian concert).

== Recordings ==
Blendinger's recordings with the Sinhoffer Quartet include Franz Danzi's string quartet "Aus Figaro", op. 6 No. 5. and the string quartets No. 2 and 3 of Otto Luening.

His clarinet concerto and Media in Vita were combined on a CD in 2006. Clarinetist Hans Schöneberger played the concerto in 1999 with the Münchener Kammerorchester, conducted by Peter Gülke, at the Allerheiligen Hofkirche in Munich. Soprano Helen Donath and bass Hermann Becht were the soloists in the cantata, performed by the Bayerisches Staatsorchester, conducted by Wolfgang Sawallisch.

In May 2021, one year after his death, a double-CD was released with 10 of his chamber-works, played by the ALEA Ensemble : string quartets No. 1-4, Fantasy in G and Trio in G for piano trio, Suite in B for string trio, Piano quartet, Duo Concertante for violin and piano, Three pieces for violoncello and piano. This double-CD (ALEA-06/21 or STB 21/05 resp.) is available at www.alea.at . The CD-edition of the "Steirischen Tonkünstlerbund" contains further Blendinger-works on app.45 CDs.

== Selected works ==
Stage

- Tanz des Boreas, Ballet for solo dancer and orchestra, Op. 34 (1979)
- Versuchung, Op. 46 (1984); libretto after "Versuchung" (Temptation) by Franz Werfel

Orchestral

- Sinfonietta, Op. 30 (1976)
- Divertimento concertante for string orchestra, Op. 41 (1983); also for string septet

Concertante

- Concerto for viola and string orchestra, Op. 16 No. 1 (1962)
- Concertino for violin and string orchestra, Op. 16 No. 2 (1962)
- Concerto tonale for cello and orchestra, Op. 22 (1971)
- Concerto for string quartet and orchestra, Op. 24 (1976)
- Concerto tritonale for bassoon and orchestra, Op. 28 (1976)
- Concerto barocco for trumpet and orchestra, Op. 33 (1977); also for trumpet and organ
- Concerto for viola and orchestra, Op. 38 (1982)
- Concerto for piano and orchestra, Op. 42 (1983)
- Concerto for brass and percussion, Op. 44
- Präludium und Meditation for cello, string orchestra and percussion, Op. 45 (1985)
- Konzertante Elegie for violin, cello, string orchestra and percussion, Op. 47 (1995)
- Kammermusik for harp and string orchestra, Op. 50 (1985)
- Symphonie concertante for brass quintet (2 trumpets, horn, trombone, tuba) and orchestra, Op. 52 (1990)
- Choralkonzert for organ and chamber orchestra (2 oboes, strings, timpani), Op. 70 (1997)
- Concerto for clarinet and orchestra, Op. 72 (1999)

Chamber music

- Spielbuch für Laien (Book of Pieces for Beginners), Dances and Pieces for various instruments, Op. 1 (1954)
- Sonatina for viola and piano (or guitar), Op. 2 No. 1 (1954)
- Sonatina for violin and piano, Op. 2 No. 2 (1954)
- Sonata for flute and piano, Op. 5 (1955)
- Suite for flute and viola, Op. 7 (1955)
- Thema mit Variationen (Theme and Variations) for cello and piano, Op. 8 (1954)
- Kleine Suite for violin, cello and piano, Op. 10 (1954)
- String Quartet No. 1, Op. 11 (1957)
- Sonata for viola and piano, Op. 12 (1958)
- Sonata for viola and harpsichord, Op. 13 (1959)
- Suite for violin solo, Op. 14 (1960)
- Piano Quartet, Op. 17 (1965)
- String Quartet No. 2, Op. 19 (1969)
- Dialog for viola and percussion, Op. 20 (1968)
- Invention und Choral for violin and organ, Op. 21 No. 1 (1975)
- Introduktion und Chaconne zu dem Choral „Heiliger Geist, du Tröster mein“ for viola and organ, Op. 21 No. 2
- Partita for viola solo, Op. 25 (1974)
- Invention und Choral for flute, organ and harp, Op. 26 (1977)
- Tre Impressioni (3 Impressions) for flute (bass flute), viola and harp, Op. 26 (1976)
- Partita for viola (or violin) and cello, Op. 27 (1972)
- String Quartet No. 3, Op. 29 (1976)
- 3 Stücke (3 Pieces) for cello and piano, Op. 31 (1955)
- Präludium und Chaconne for 12 cellos, Op. 32 (1978)
- Concerto barocco for trumpet and organ, Op. 33 (1977); also for trumpet and orchestra
- Meditation über den Choral „Nun bitten wir den heiligen Geist“ for cello and organ, Op. 36 (1984)
- 3 Stücke (3 Pieces) for cello and piano, Op. 38
- String Quintet, Op. 39 (1982)
- Suite for viola solo, Op. 40 (1982)
- Divertimento concertante in G for string septet (2 violins, 2 violas, 2 cellos, double bass), Op. 41 (1983); also for string orchestra
- Suite for harp, Op. 43 (1988)
- Suite marseillaise for harp, Op. 48 (1989)
- Fagott-Quintett (Bassoon Quintet), Op. 51 (1991)
- String Quartet No. 4, Op. 54 (1990)
- Trio in G for flute (or violin), cello and piano, Op. 55 (1992)
- Tonale Skizzen for viola, cello and double bass, Op. 56 (1993)
- Fantasie in G for violin, cello and piano, Op. 57 (1992)
- Nocturne et chanson for flute and harp, Op. 62 (1994)
- Elegie for horn (or bass clarinet) and piano (or chamber orchestra), Op. 65 (1995)
- 2 Stücke (2 Pieces) for flute and harpsichord (or guitar), Op. 67 (1995)
- Choralmeditation on „O Welt, ich muß dich lassen“ for alto saxophone and organ, Op. 73 (1998)
- Klarinettenquintett (Clarinet Quintet), Op. 76 (1998)
- Faust-Monolog for bassoon solo, Op. 78 (2001)
- Duo concertante for violin and piano, Op. 85 (2003)
- Symposion Nr. 1: Meditation über eine Bachsche Sarabande for 6 harps, Op. 81b (2002)
- Symposion Nr. 2: Toccata for 4 harps, Op. 81 (2002)

Organ

- Phantasie über den Choral "Wachet auf, ruft uns die Stimme", Op. 49
- Choralvariationen, Op. 86 (2003)

Piano

- Suite for piano 4-hands, Op. 3 (1954)
- Sonata, Op. 4 (1953)
- Sonatina, Op. 6 (1956)
- 5 leichte Stücke (5 Easy Pieces), Op. 9 (1954)
- 3 Präludien (3 Preludes), Op. 23 (1984)

Vocal

- Kammermusik for baritone and string quartet, Op. 18 (1966)
- 3 Gesänge (3 Songs) for baritone and piano (1991); words by Rainer Maria Rilke
- Liederzyklus nach japanischen Gedichten (Song Cycle after Japanese Poems) for soprano and piano, Op. 37 (1996)
- Meditation zum Karfreitag (Meditation for Good Friday) for baritone and string quintet, Op. 59 (1993); words by Alfred Tillich
- 3 Gesänge (3 Songs) for baritone and piano, Op. 60 (1994); words by Alois Hergouth
- Caritas or Mein kränkelnd Herz (My sickly heart) for baritone and piano, Op. 61 (1994); words by Hans-Otto Meissner
- 3 Gesänge (3 Songs) for mezzo-soprano and harp, Op. 63 (1994); words by Alois Hergouth
- Kammermusik for narrator, baritone and small orchestra, Op. 68 (1995); words after Die Stadt by Hermann Hesse
- Der Babylonische Turm (The Tower of Babel), Fantasie for soprano (or baritone) and organ, Op. 69 (1996); Biblical words
- 3 Gesänge (3 Songs) for baritone and piano (1997); words by Friedrich Nietzsche
- Im Wandern (In Hiking) for baritone and harp, Op. 77 No. 1 (1999); words by Joseph von Eichendorff
- Herbstbild (Image of Autumn) for soprano, flute, cello and harp, Op. 80 (2001); words by Friedrich Hebbel
- Psalmgebet nach Psalm 90 Vers 1-4 "Herr, du bist unsere Zuflucht für und für", Solo Cantata for soprano, trumpet and organ, Op. 82 (2000)
- 3 Gesänge (3 Songs) for mezzo-soprano and piano, Op. 83 (2002); words by Alois Hergouth
- 5 Weihnachtslieder (5 Christmas carols) for soprano (or baritone) and harp (or organ), Op. 84 (2002)
- 3 Gesänge nach chinesischen Gedichten (3 Songs on Chinese Poetry) for soprano, harp and vibraphone (or xylophone), Op. 87 (2003)

Choral

- Die Ameisen (nach Ringelnatz), Short Cantata for 3-voice children's chorus, flute, piano and snare drum, Op. 15 (1957)
- Media in vita (In the Midst of Life), Symphonic Scenes for soloists, chorus and orchestra, Op. 35 (1979–1980)
- Mich ruft zuweilen eine Stille (Sometimes a silence calls me), Cantata for soloists, chorus and orchestra, Op. 58 (1992)
- Allein den Betern kann es noch gelingen (It can only be achieved by those who pray), Cantata for baritone, chorus and orchestra (or organ), Op. 64 (1995)
- Musik zum Karfreitag und Ostersonntag (Music for Good Friday and Easter Sunday), Op. 66 (1995)

1. Melos for English horn
2. Klage-Refrain for 2 oboes, string orchestra and timpani
3. Choralbearbeitungen
4. Choral Meditation zum Ostersonntag
5. Choral-Variation über "Wach auf, mein Herz, die Nacht ist hin"
6. Improvisation for oboe and organ

- 3 geistliche Gesänge (3 Sacred Songs) for mixed chorus a cappella für gemischten Chor a cappella, Op. 71 (1997)
- Requiem for mezzo-soprano, baritone, chorus and orchestra, Op. 75 (2001)
- Alles, was Odem hat, Cantata for soprano, trumpet and organ, Op. 77 No. 2 (2000); text: Psalm 150
- Solokantate for baritone, male chorus and piano, Op. 79 (2000); words by Christian Fürchtegott Gellert
- 3 Psalmgesänge for male chorus, Op. 88 (2006)
