= Otto Schenk =

Austrian actor and director (1930–2025)

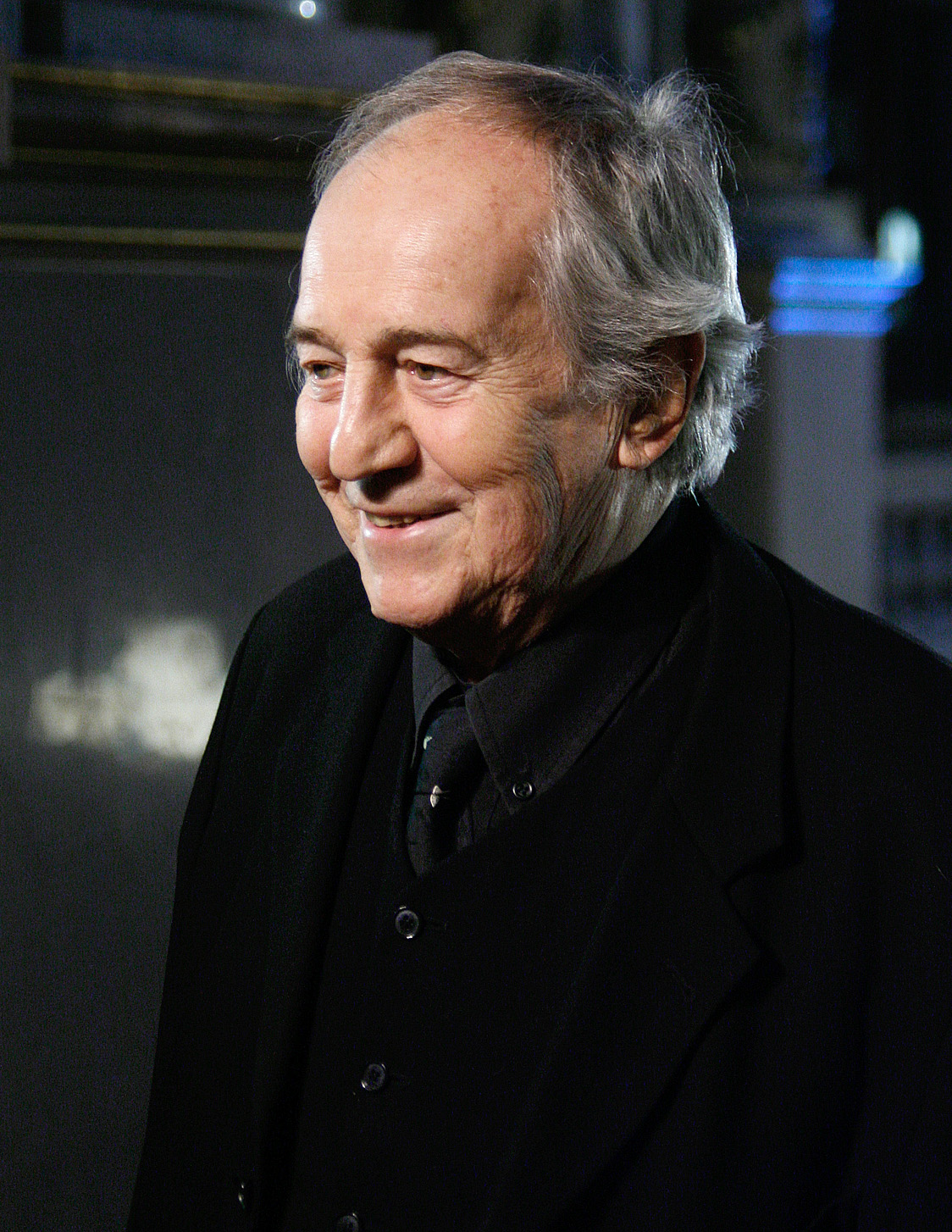
- Schenk in 2010
- Born: 12 June 1930; Vienna, Austria
- Died: 9 January 2025 (aged 94); Oberhofen am Irrsee, Salzkammergut, Austria
- Occupations: Actor; Stage director; Theatre director
- Spouse: Renée Michaelis (m. 1956; died 2022)
- Children: 1

Signature
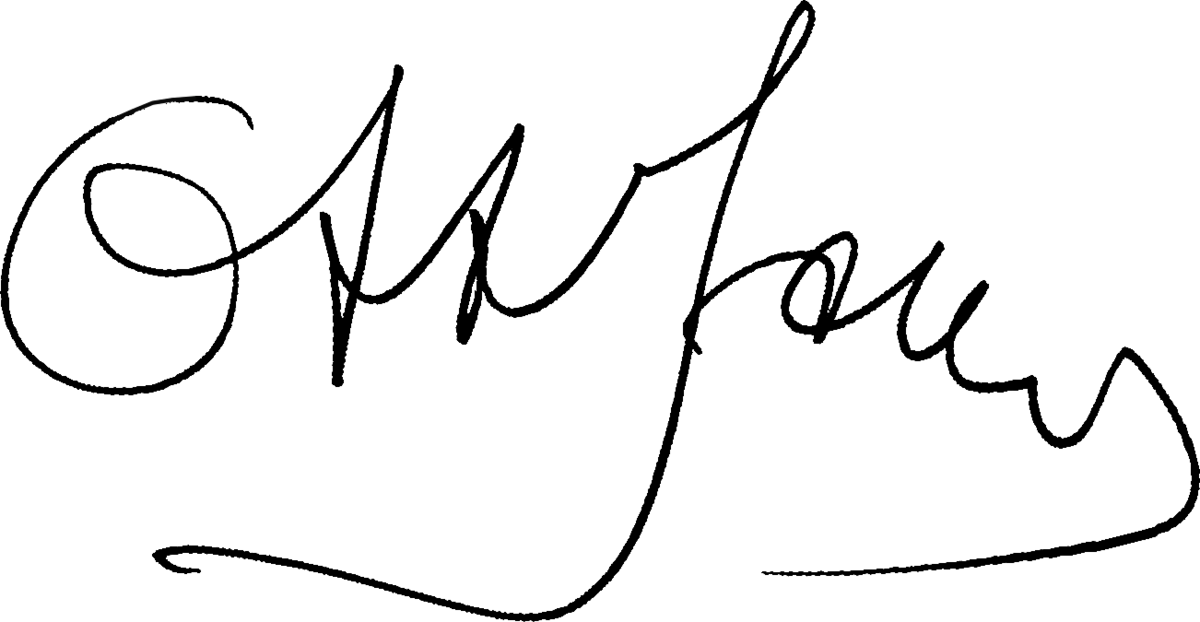

Otto Schenk (12 June 1930 – 9 January 2025) was an Austrian actor, stage director for plays and opera, and theatre director. He worked internationally at major houses such as the Vienna State Opera and the Metropolitan Opera in New York City. Schenk's operatic productions included works by Mozart, Verdi, Richard Strauss and Alban Berg. He directed the world premiere of Friedrich Cerha's Baal at the Salzburg Festival in 1981. Some of his productions have remained in the repertoire for decades, such as Puccini's La Bohème at the Bavarian State Opera from 1969, Die Fledermaus by J. Strauss at the Vienna State Opera from 1972, and his traditionalist version of Wagner's Ring cycle at the Metropolitan Opera from 1986 to 2009. Schenk also directed films of operas and plays, and was on the board of directors of the Salzburg Festival and the Theater in der Josefstadt.

== Life and career ==
Schenk was born on 12 June 1930 in Vienna to Catholic parents. His father, a lawyer, had Jewish roots and therefore lost his job after Hitler's annexation of Austria in 1938. His mother was Italian. He achieved his Matura at the Stubenbastei and then studied law for a year at the University of Vienna. Schenk studied acting at the Max Reinhardt Seminar.

=== Plays ===
Schenk started his acting career at the 1950s at the Theater der Jugend, a youth theatre in Vienna. He soon also played at the Theater in der Josefstadt and the Wiener Volkstheater, and as a comedian at Vienna's Kabarett Simpl. He turned to also directing in 1953, and introduced absurd theatre, especially plays by Samuel Beckett and Eugene Ionesco, soon as a master of comedy leaning to tragedy.

He later directed plays by William Shakespeare, Arthur Schnitzler, Ödön von Horváth, and Anton Chekhov at renowned stages such as the Burgtheater, the Munich Kammerspiele and the Salzburg Festival.

=== Opera ===
In 1957, Schenk directed his first opera, Mozart's Die Zauberflöte for the Salzburger Landestheater. His breakthrough as an opera director came in 1962 with Alban Berg's Lulu at the Theater an der Wien. This production was later moved to the Vienna State Opera, where Schenk debuted in 1964 with Leoš Janáček's Jenůfa. He was contracted by the Vienna State Opera as a permanent director for several seasons, while continuing his free-lance career as an actor, comedian and director in Austria and Germany, working for theatres, opera houses and television productions. In 1965 Austrian television engaged him to direct a studio production of Verdi's Otello sung in German with a stellar cast. During the 1970s and 1980s, Schenk was hired by La Scala in Milan, the Royal Opera House in London, and German opera houses such as the Berlin State Opera, the Bavarian State Opera and the Hamburg State Opera. He directed ten productions at the Bavarian State Opera; his 1972 version of Der Rosenkavalier by R. Strauss in a stage design by Jürgen Rose was played until 2021, and his 1969 staging of Puccini's La bohème has remained in the repertoire as the oldest production at the house still played.

In the United States, Schenk is especially remembered for his lavish traditionalist productions at the Metropolitan Opera (Met) where he first staged Puccini's Tosca in 1968. He directed the Wagner epic cycle Der Ring des Nibelungen in 1986 with stage design by Günther Schneider-Siemssen, which was hailed by Wagnerian opera lovers as close to Wagner's vision. The production was retired from the Met in 2009. His 2006 farewell production was Donizetti's Don Pasquale. In October 2010, Schenk returned to the Met to revive it with Anna Netrebko. The Met currently uses his productions of Wagner's Die Meistersinger von Nürnberg, Tannhäuser, Arabella by R. Strauss, and Don Pasquale. In December 2010, he revived his Rosenkavalier at the Vienna State Opera, conducted by Asher Fish with a cast including Adrianne Pieczonka.

Schenk staged 31 productions at the Vienna State Opera and 16 productions at the Met.

=== Film ===
Schenk appeared in over 30 films (mostly in German). In 1973, he directed Merry-Go-Round, a film based on Arthur Schnitzler's Reigen (with Helmut Berger, Sydne Rome and Senta Berger). Schenk also starred in the stage adaptation of Lily Brett's Chuzpe at the Kammerspiele Theatre in Vienna.

=== Theatre direction ===
He was a member of the board of the Salzburg Festival and a co-director of the Theater in der Josefstadt.

=== Personal life and death ===
Schenk married Renée Michaelis in 1956; they had met at the Reinhardt Seminar. She had played major roles on stage, but gradually gave up her career. She died in 2022 after a long illness. Their son, Konstantin Schenk, was born in 1957 and became a conductor.

Schenk died at his lake house near Lake Irrsee in Salzkammergut in the municipality of Oberhofen am Irrsee, on 9 January 2025, at the age of 94. A black flag was flown by the Vienna State Opera and the Salzburg Festival as a sign of mourning.

== Awards ==
- Kammerschauspieler
- 1980: Honorary member of the Vienna State Opera
- 1991: Nestroy-Ring
- 1993: Bayerischer Filmpreis
- 1994: Grand Decoration of Honour in Gold for Services to the Republic of Austria
- 1995: Karl Valentin Order
- 1997: Ring of Honour of the City of Vienna
- 2000: Honorary member of the Theater in der Josefstadt
- 2000: Nestroy Theatre Prize for life's work
- 2016: Platin-Romy for life's work
- 2023: Österreichischer Musiktheaterpreis for life's work

== Works as opera producer and director ==
- Mozart: Die Zauberflöte (1957), Landestheater Salzburg, debut as an opera director
- Alban Berg: Lulu (1962), Vienna State Opera (Karl Böhm conducting)
- Verdi: Othello (1965, in German), Argeo Quadri, conductor, directed for Austrian Television
- Carmen (1966), Vienna State Opera (Lorin Maazel conducting; with Christa Ludwig in the title role)
- Mozart: Don Giovanni (15 June 1967), Vienna State Opera (designed by Luciano Damiani; Josef Krips conducting, with Cesare Siepi as Don Giovanni and Erich Kunz as Leporello)
- R. Strauss: Der Rosenkavalier (1968), Vienna State Opera (Leonard Bernstein conducting)
- Beethoven: Fidelio (1970), Vienna State Opera (Bernstein cond.)
- J. Strauss: Die Fledermaus (1972), Bavarian State Opera in Munich
- Mozart: Le nozze di Figaro (1974), La Scala (Claudio Abbado conducting, with Mirella Freni as the Countess, José van Dam as Figaro, and Teresa Berganza as Cherubino)
- Verdi: Un ballo in maschera (1975), Royal Opera House, (Claudio Abbado conducting, with Plácido Domingo, Katia Ricciarelli, Reri Grist, Piero Cappuccilli)
- Wagner: Tannhäuser (1977), Met, still in use.
- Giordano: Andrea Chénier (1981), Vienna State Opera (Nello Santi conducting, with Plácido Domingo in the title role)
- Friedrich Cerha: Baal (1981, premiere), Salzburg Festival (later also Vienna State Opera)
- Weber: Der Freischütz (1983), Bregenzer Festspiele
- Wagner: Der Ring des Nibelungen (1986), Met (James Levine conducting), retired in May 2009.
- Puccini: Manon Lescaut (1986), Vienna State Opera (Giuseppe Sinopoli conducting, with Mirella Freni as Manon)
- Die Zauberflöte (1988), Vienna State Opera (Nikolaus Harnoncourt conducting, with Jerry Hadley as Tamino and Luciana Serra as the Queen of the Night)
- Verdi: Rigoletto (1989), Met (Marcello Panni conducting, with Leo Nucci in the title role, Luciano Pavarotti as the Duke and June Anderson as Gilda).
- Wagner: Parsifal (1991), Met (James Levine conducting, with Siegfried Jerusalem in the title role).
- R: Strauss: Elektra (1992), Met (Deborah Voigt as Chrysothemis).
- Wagner: Die Meistersinger von Nürnberg (1993), Met (James Levine conducting), still in use
- Dvořák: Rusalka (1987), Vienna State Opera (with Gabriela Beňačková as Rusalka and Václav Neumann conducting).
- Donizetti: Don Pasquale (31 March 2006), Met (Maurizio Benini conducting, standing in for an injured James Levine), with Anna Netrebko as Norina and Juan Diego Flórez as Ernesto

== Films ==
- Dunja (1955) as actor
- Always Trouble with the Reverend (1972) as actor
- Merry-Go-Round (1973) (a remake of Max Ophüls's 1950 film La Ronde, based on Schnitzler's play, as director
- Arabella (1977) as director
- The Living Corpse (1981, TV film) after Tolstoy's play, as director

Many of his productions are available on DVD, including his Vienna State Opera productions of Fidelio and Rosenkavalier, and his Met productions of Parsifal, Die Meistersinger von Nürnberg, Tannhäuser and Der Ring des Nibelungen.
