= Carinthischer Sommer =

Austrian classical music festival

The Carinthian Summer is a music and cultural festival in the Austrian province of Carinthia. It was founded in 1969 in Ossiach and since then has been held annually in the months of July and August. Since 1972, also in the city of Villach and since 2003, also at other venues in Carinthia.

== Programme focus ==
The festival programme has been built on the focal points of master concerts, chamber music and orchestral concerts, as well as seminars and symposia.

Since 1974, a special feature of the programme has been the "Ossiach church opera", with the Austrian premiere of Benjamin Britten's The Prodigal Son (1975) and world premieres (from 1982 onwards mostly composition commissions from the festival) of sacred music theatre works by contemporary Austrian composers (among others. Cesar Bresgen, Herbert Lauermann, Karl Heinz Füssl, Dieter Kaufmann, Kurt Schwertsik, Iván Eröd, Peter Planyavsky, Thomas Daniel Schlee, Bruno Strobl, Gottfried von Einem).

Chamber operas written by contemporary composers were also premiered in Villach between 1993 and 2003 (Gerhard Schedl, Wolfram Wagner, Hugo Käch, René Clemencic).

In 1982 the "Carinthian Children's Summer" was founded, which was intended to integrate children as active participants in the major festival events.

The festival gained international reputation through world-famous soloists and conductors such as Claudio Abbado, Aigul Akhmetshina, Benjamin Appl, Leonard Bernstein, Karl Böhm, Yefim Bronfman, Grace Bumbry, Montserrat Caballé, José Carreras, René Clemencic Alma Deutscher, Christoph von Dohnányi, Vladimir Fedoseyev, Bernarda Fink, Ádám Fischer, Sir James Galway, Bruno Ganz, John Eliot Gardiner, Nicolai Gedda, Valery Gergiev, Emil Gilels, Martin Grubinger, Hilary Hahn, Hans and Martin Haselböck, Michael Heltau, Cyprien Katsaris, Lukas Kranzelbinder, Gidon Kremer, Elisabeth Leonskaja, Marjana Lipovšek, Lorin Maazel, Oleg Maisenberg, Mischa Maisky, Neville Marriner, Zubin Mehta, Tobias Moretti, Riccardo Muti, Roger Norrington, David Oistrakh, Seiji Ozawa, Boris Pergamenschikow, Markus Poschner, Will Quadflieg, Ruggero Raimondi, Carole Dawn Reinhart, Katia Ricciarelli, Mstislav Rostropovich, Peter Schreier, Horst Stein, Henryk Szeryng and many more.

International orchestras included the Israel Philharmonic Orchestra, Mariinsky Orchestra St. Petersburg, Tchaikovsky Orchestra Moscow, Orchestra Filarmonica della Scala, Orchestra del Maggio Musicale Fiorentino, London Symphony Orchestra and the Vienna Philharmonic. In addition, there were guest performances by chamber operas such as the Moscow Chamber Opera, Scottish Opera and Warsaw Chamber Opera.

== Venues ==
The central venues of the festival are the Ossiach Collegiate Church and the Congress Center Villach. Until 2003, performances were held exclusively in Ossiach (Abbey Church, Baroque Hall and Knights' Hall of the Abbey, Abbey Courtyard as well as on board the motor vessel MS Ossiach) and in Villach (Congress Center, Bamberg Hall of the former Parkhotel, St. Jakob's Parish Church (Paracelsushof)). From 2004 onwards, the "Carinthian Landscape" was expanded by opening up new venues in the immediate vicinity of Ossiach and Villach (Domenig Steinhaus, Pfarrkirche Tiffen, Damtschach Castle). In 2009, the Alban Berg Hall, which had been added to the Ossiach Monastery, was added. Since 2016, additional rooms and gardens of Carinthian families and institutions have been used for the "Salonkonzerte" series.

== History ==
The initiators and founders were the Ossiach parish provost Jakob Stingl, the musician (solo trumpeter of the Vienna Philharmonic) and manager Helmut Wobisch and Nikolaus Fheodoroff (composer, conductor, pianist and musical director of the ORF regional studio in Carinthia).

The founding concert in the collegiate church of Ossiach, the baroque sacred space and central venue of the first years of the festival, was played on 25 June 1969 by the pianist Wilhelm Backhaus – as a benefit for the purchase of a new organ, which was inaugurated in 1971 and given the name Wilhelm Backhaus Memorial Organ.

In 1970 the association Carinthian Summer was founded. Helmut Wobisch was the chairman of the association and artistic director until his death in 1980. He built up the festival, continuously enriched its programme (church opera as a "trademark" from 1974) and led it to international recognition (including the first European Leonard Bernstein Festival in 1977).

In 1972, the Drau city of Villach with its newly built Kongresshaus was added as a "second home". The series of major orchestral concerts held there since then was opened by David Oistrakh and the Moscow Philharmonic Orchestra.

With Wobisch's death, there was a separation between the artistic directorship and the management of the association. The festival co-founder Nikolaus Fheodoroff became chairman of the association and held this honorary position for 30 years (1980–2010).

As artistic director with sole artistic, organisational and financial responsibility, the association appointed Gerda Fröhlich, a theatre scholar and cultural manager who had worked as an assistant for the festival since its beginnings, at the time the first woman in such a position. She expanded the festival programme beyond classical music with commissions to contemporary Austrian composers for Ossiach church operas (12 premieres) and for children's operas as part of the new focus on "Carinthian Children's Summer". After 24 seasons, she retired at the end of 2003.

She was succeeded in 2004 by the composer, organist and cultural manager Thomas Daniel Schlee, who continued to programme church opera productions from the pens of international composers with composer portraits as well as introducing a new cycle with jazz and world music with "cs alternativ".

Since January 2016, the musicologist and manager Holger Bleck has been the managing artistic director of the Carinthian Summer. Music salons, picnic and station concerts will take place at new venues, such as in Carinthian castles and gardens. With the format: "CS unterwegs", avant-garde arrangements of folk music are offered free of charge in public spaces on ÖBB routes. Jazz, Crossover music and singer-songwriter are represented on an equal footing with classical music.

== Artistic Director/Director ==
- 1969–1979: Helmut Wobisch
- 1980–2003: Gerda Fröhlich
- 2004–2015: Thomas Daniel Schlee
- since 2016: Holger Bleck

== Association/Managers ==
- 1969–1979: Helmut Wobisch
- 1980–2010: Nikolaus Fheodoroff
- 2011–2016: Walburga Litschauer
- 2017–2019: Klemens Fheodoroff

The following regular artists of the Carinthian Summer were appointed honorary members: Paul Badura-Skoda, Rudolf Buchbinder, Gottfried von Einem, Robert Holl, Christa Ludwig.
