= Chamber Concerto (Ligeti) =

Musical composition by György Ligeti

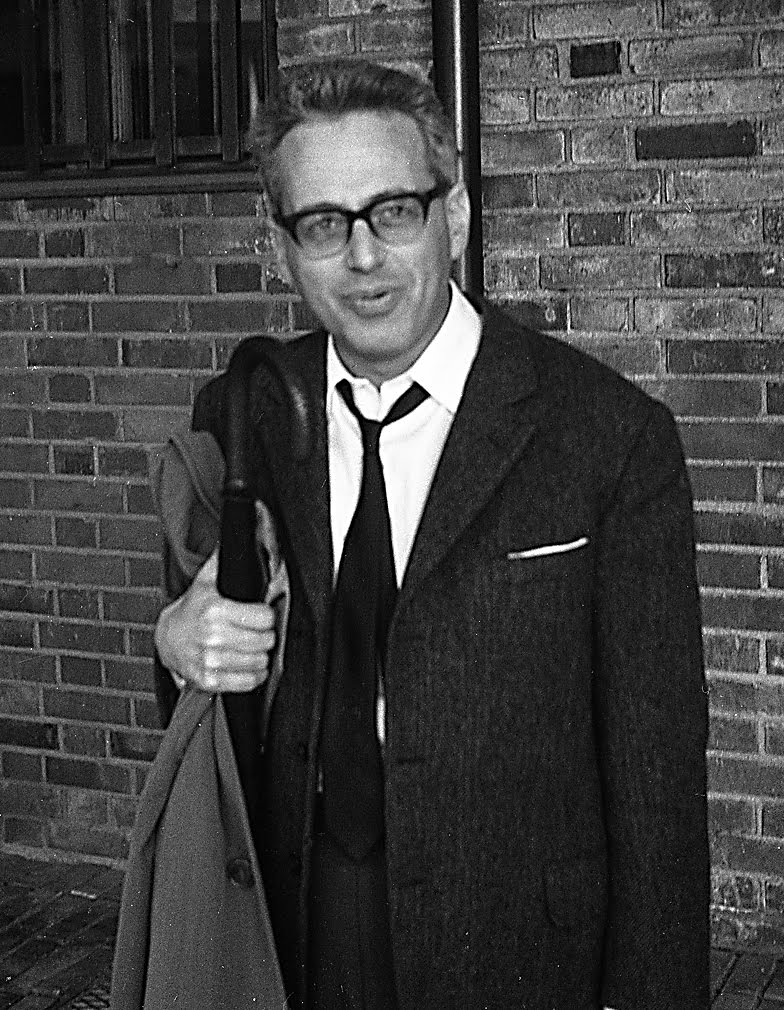
György Ligeti in the 1960s

The Chamber Concerto is a work for winds, piano, harpsichord, and strings by György Ligeti. Composed between 1969 and 1970, the work was premiered on October 1, 1970 by Friedrich Cerha, to whom the piece is dedicated, and his ensemble die reihe.

The piece is in four movements:

1. Corrente (Fließend)
2. Calmo, sostenuto
3. Movimento preciso e mecanico
4. Presto

It is scored for flute (doubling piccolo), oboe (doubling English horn and oboe d'amore), clarinet, bass clarinet, horn, tenor trombone, harpsichord (doubling harmonium), piano (doubling celesta), and string quintet.

The Chamber Concerto uses micropolyphonic textures, which Ligeti describes as, "One clearly discernible interval combination is gradually blurred, and from this cloudiness it is possible to discern a new interval combination taking shape." However, it also demonstrates a shift away from this type of writing in Ligeti's music, and towards a more, melodic, eclectic style.

A typical performance lasts about 20 minutes.

== Sources ==
- François-René Tranchefort (direction), Guide de la Musique de Chambre, Paris, Fayard, coll. « Les indispensables de la musique », 1998 (1re éd. 1989), VIII-995 p. (ISBN 2-213-02403-0, OCLC 717306887, notice BnF no FRBNF35064530), p. 415
