= Michele Trenti =

Italian conductor and composer

Michele Trenti (born 25 August 1961) is an Italian composer and conductor.

== Biography ==
Born in Genoa (Italy) on 25 August 1961, Trenti studied guitar for 13 years with Anselmo Bersano. From 1984 to 1988 studied composition with Iván Erőd and conducting with Milan Horvat at the Hochschule fur Musik und Darstellende Kunst in Graz (Austria), where he graduated summa cum laude. Master classes with Arpad Joo, Moshe Atzmon, and Leonard Bernstein.

From 1988 to 2004 Trenti was Artistic Director of the Genoese Philharmonic Orchestra.

From 1989 to 2004 Trenti has been principal conductor of the Youth Philharmonic Orchestra of Genoa, and from 1997 to 1999, vice president of the AMI-Italian Association of Musicians, based in Pesaro.

In 2003, Trenti was in charge of a project funded by the European Commission in Brussels for the international presentation of Genoa, the 2004 European Capital of Culture, conducting in the capitals of the countries in the expanded European Union.

On 1 January 2004, Trenti conducted the New Year's Concert in Budapest organized in Hungary's first parliament building in collaboration with the Italian Embassy.

Trenti's compositions and arrangements have been performed and broadcast in various countries; he published three books: Appunti - Philharmonia in 2010; Parlando di musica - Philharmonia in 2011, and Musica con i giovani in 2012.

In 2012 Trenti received the Artists of Liguria award.

== List of compositions (chronological) ==
- Andante largo for orchestra (1984)
- Variations on the constellation of Cassiopea for octet (1982–85)
- Monologo for solo clarinet (1985)
- Ballata del Petrarca for mixed choir (1986)
- Shelley Prelude for chamber orchestra (1987)
- Gaby Hein gewidmet for piano (1987)
- Tre liriche di Quasimodo for voice and piano (1988–89)
- Fantasia for clarinet, violoncello e piano (1989)
- Oboe sommerso per baritono e orchestra (1995)
- Concerto for violin and orchestra (2005)
- Prayer for children choir (2005)
- Fantasia for orchestra (2007, orchestral version of "Fantasia" 1989)
- Laye, laye for voice e piano (2007 - also orchestral version)
- Sei rispetti for vocal quartet (2007)
- Regina coeli for soloists, choirs and orchestra (2009)
- Divertimento canonico for string quartet (2010)
- Symphony no. 1 (2011)
- Capriccio for solo violin (2012)
- Crown of thorns for female choir (2012)
- Fantasy for clarinet, viola and piano (2012, viola version of "Fantasia" 1989)
- Divertimento no. 2 for string quartet (2013)
- Quattro bagatelle sentimentali for violin and piano (I-II 1989, III-IV 2014)
- Ave Maria for 9 voices (2014)
- Concertino for cello and chamber orchestra (2014)
- Songs of the new moon for bariton, clarinet and guitar (2014)
- Madre Teresa's words for mixed choir (2014)
- April 1, 2015 for mixed choir without words (2015)
- Symphony n. 2 (2015)
- April 1, 2016 for mixed choir without words (2016)
- Behind the wait for voice and piano, on poems by Alessandra Capocaccia Quadri (2016)

== Arrangements ==
=== I - For orchestra ===
- Giovanni Battista Dalla Gostena: Fantasia X (orig.: for luth)
- Michelangelo Rossi: Madrigale "Per non mi dir" (orig.: 5 voices a cappella)
- Franz Liszt: Annèe de pélerinage - II Annèe: Italie (7 pieces) (orig.: piano)
- Franz Liszt: Via crucis (orig.: organ and voices)
- Franz Liszt: Missa pro organo (orig.: organ)
- Franz Liszt: Bach-Variationen (orig.: organ)
- Franz Liszt-Leoš Janáček: Missa pro organo (orig.: organ)
- Hugo Wolf: 10 geistliche Lieder aus dem Spanisches Liederbuch (orig.: voice and piano)
- Friedrich Nietzsche: Manfred Meditation (orig.: Piano 4 hands)
- 7 Traditional Christmas Carols
- Giacomo Puccini: Tosca, II act, complete - for octet and voices

=== II - For guitar ===
- Johannes Brahms: 7 Lieder op. 48 (original keys), for voice and guitar
- 12 Encores (Vivaldi, Bach-Gounod, Schubert, Schumann, Mendelssohn, Brahms, Dvořák, Massenet, Faure, Saint-Saëns, Kreisler), for violin and guitar

=== III - Chamber ensembles ===
- Hugo Wolf: 3 Lieder from the Italian Songbook, for mixed choir
- Undzer rebenu, Hebrew traditional song, for voice, vl. and piano
- Canco del ladre, Catalan folksong, for fl., vc. and guitar.
- 2 Hymns, for violin and piano
