= Baal (opera) =

1981 opera by Friedrich Cerha

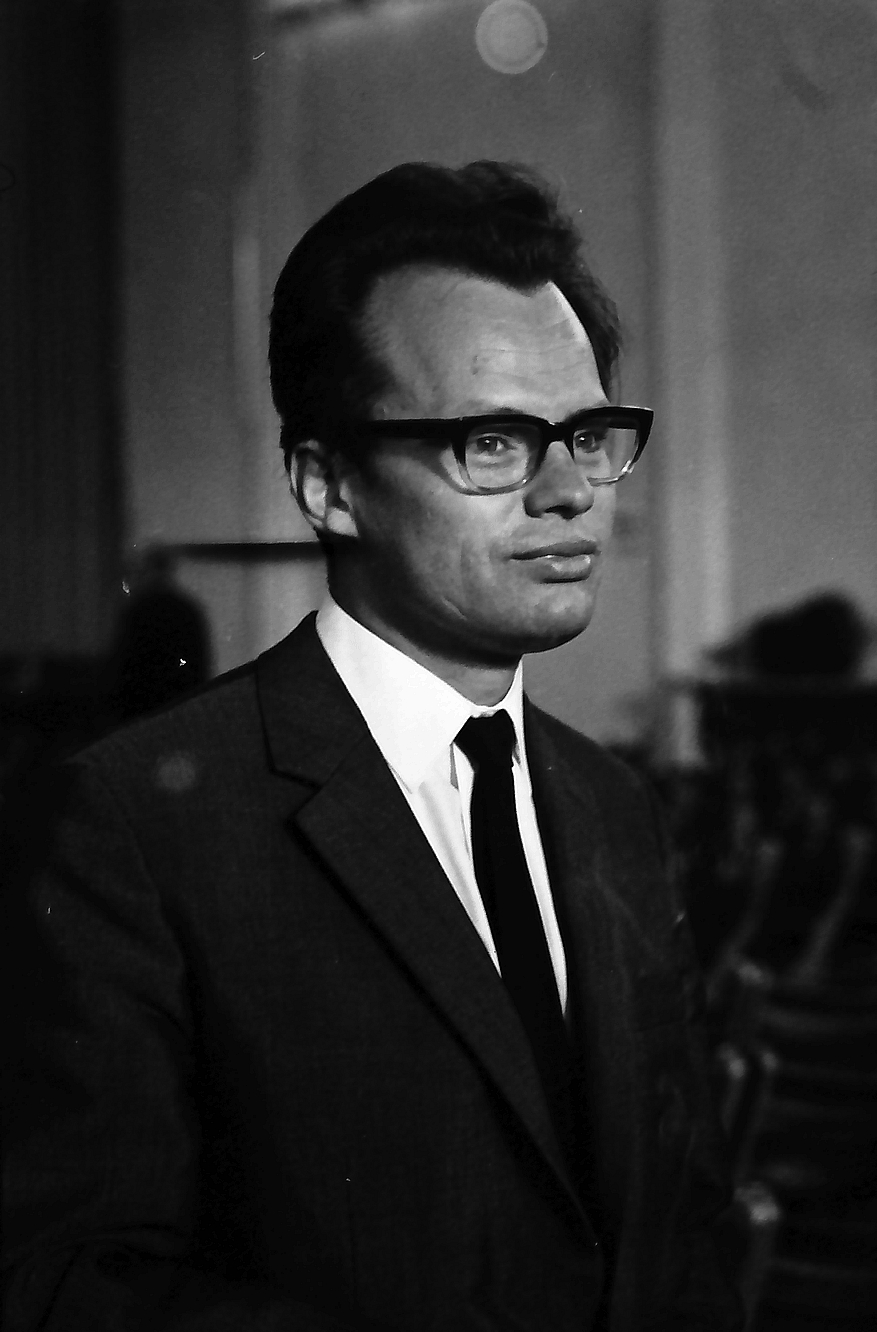
- Cerha in 1964
- Librettist: Cerha
- Language: German
- Based on: Baal by Bertolt Brecht
- Premiere: 7 August 1981; Salzburg Festival

Baal is an opera by Friedrich Cerha, based on Brecht's play. It was composed from 1974 and first performed in 1981 at the Salzburg Festival in a coproduction with the Vienna State Opera.

== History ==
Cerha composed Baal as his first opera. He received a commission from the Austrian Ministry of Education and Art in 1974 to write an opera. He worked from 1974 to 1980 on the composition based on Brecht's play of the same name. The play was Brecht's first, written when he was a student. Cerha wrote the libretto based on the play, in two parts. Baal was the first of a trilogy of literature operas, followed by Der Rattenfänger, composed from 1984 to 1986 based on a text by Carl Zuckmayer, and Der Riese vom Steinfeld, written from 1997 to 1999 to a text by Peter Turrini. In all three works, an individual person is in conflict with society.

Baal was influenced by Berg's Wozzeck. Cerha followed Brecht's text in melody and rhythm. The character Baal is portrayed as an outsider unwilling to accept society's conditions, leading to violence, inner emigration and self-destruction. The individual is characterised by melodies and ballads, while repetition of formulas stand for the society, and "meshes of sound" for nature. Cerha used various historic forms such as passacaglia, fugue, foxtrot and reggae.

Baal was premiered at the Salzburg Festival at the Kleines Festspielhaus on 7 August 1981, directed by Otto Schenk and with the Vienna Philharmonic conducted by Christoph von Dohnányi, with performances also at the Vienna State Opera then and in 1992, The title role was portrayed by Theo Adam. The opera was produced at the Staatsoper Berlin in 1982. It was published by Universal Edition.

Cerha also wrote a reduced version, published by UE. It was premiered in Vienna on 29 September 2011 by the Amadeus Ensemble, conducted by Walter Kobéra.

== Roles ==
Roles, voice types, premiere cast
Role	Voice type	Premiere cast, 7 August 1981 Conductor: Christoph von Dohnányi
Baal	baritone	Theo Adam
Ekart	bass	Helmut Berger-Tuna
Johannes	tenor	Heiner Hopfner
Emilie	mezzo-soprano	Marjana Lipovšek
Johanna	soprano	Gabriele Sima
Sophie	soprano	Emily Rawlins
Baal's mother	mezzo-soprano	Martha Mödl
many smaller roles
