= Thomas Daniel Schlee =

Austrian composer (1957–2025)

- Schlee c. 2007
- Born: 26 October 1957; Vienna, Austria
- Died: 10 November 2025 (aged 68); Vienna, Austria
- Occupations: Composer; Arts administrator; Organist
- Awards: Order of Arts and Letters; Austrian Decoration for Science and Art

Thomas Daniel Schlee (26 October 1957 – 10 November 2025) was an Austrian composer, arts administrator and organist. He directed the Brucknerhaus in Linz and was artistic director of the Brucknerfest from 1990 to 1998. He was vice general manager of the Beethovenfest in Bonn from 1999 to 2003, and general manager of the Carinthischer Sommer from 2004 to 2015.

== Life and career ==
Schlee was born in Vienna on 26 October 1957, the elder of two sons of the musicologist, theater scientist, and music publisher Alfred Schlee (1901–1999) and Margaret Molner. His father was an influential editor and director of Universal Edition (UE), responsible for the publication of new music. From Schlee's early childhood on, he was in close contact with important personalities of the music of the 20th century. He took organ lessons with Friedrich Lessky.

Schlee studied at the Vienna Music Academy from 1976 to 1983, organ with Michael Radulescu and harmony and counterpoint with Erich Romanovsky. He studied simultaneously musicology and art history at the Vienna University, earning a PhD in 1984. During the 1977/78 term, Schlee listened to Olivier Messiaen's last composition class in Paris and studied privately with composer and organist Jean Langlais. Upon returning to Austria, he studied composition further with Francis Burt from 1982 to 1985.

From 1986 to 1989, Schlee was a music dramaturge at the Salzburger Landestheater. He taught at the Vienna Music Academy and at the institute of musicology at the Salzburg University. He was music director at the Brucknerhaus in Linz and artistic director of the Brucknerfest from 1990 to 1998. From 1995, he worked simultaneously as musicologist for the Guardini Foundation in Berlin, where he was as scientific director of the international project La Cité céleste, dedicated to Messiaen's work, responsible for exhibitions, concerts, competitions, a monograph, lectures, and symposia in 15 European cities. From 1998 to 2001, he was president of the Guardini Foundation, and from 2004 to 2011 head of its advisory committee for music.

Schlee was vice general manager of the Beethovenfest in Bonn from 1999 to 2003. He was Intendant of the Carinthischer Sommer festival from 2004 to 2015. During his tenure, he expanded the number of venues and continued a tradition of church operas which opened possibilities for several composers to have their works premiered. He was a member of the university committee of the Mozarteum in Salzburg from 2008 to 2013.

Schlee died unexpectedly on 10 November 2025, at the age of 68.

== Composer ==
As a composer, Schlee wrote works in many genres, which have been mainly published by Bärenreiter, and also by Lemoine, Leduc, Universal Edition, Doblinger, among others. He focused on compositions for organ and sacred music. Like Messiaen, he wrote in an approach based on religion and mysticism, searching for "traces of beauty and depth of expression" ("Spuren von Schönheit und Ausdruckstiefe")."

Schlee received commissions from the Gesellschaft der Musikfreunde, Göttinger Symphonieorchester, and the Wiener Concert-Verein, and Musiktage Mondsee, among others. In the 1997/98 season, Schlee was composer in residence of the Vienna Concert Verein.

His music was performed by interpreters including Maurice André, Sharon Bezaly, Bertrand de Billy, Riccardo Chailly, Dennis Russell Davies, Plácido Domingo, Alfred Eschwé, Vladimir Fedoseyev, Heinz Karl Gruber, Leopold Hager, Zsolt Hamar, Ursula Holliger, Okko Kamu, Michael Martin Kofler, Heinrich Schiff, Hansjörg Schellenberger, Wolfgang Schulz, Pinchas Steinberg, Sándor Végh, Ralf Weikert, Franz Welser-Möst, Lothar Zagrosek, the Auryn Quartet, the soloists of the Staatskapelle Dresden, the Camerata Salzburg, the Klangforum Wien, the Tonkünstler Orchestra, the Vienna Radio Symphony Orchestra, the Gewandhausorchester, the Württembergische Philharmonie Reutlingen, and the Copenhagen Philharmonic.

== Organist ==
As an organist, Schlee performed intensely throughout Europe, was soloist at renowned international festivals, recorded for radio and CDs, earning awards, including the Preis der deutschen Schallplattenkritik, the Diapason d'Or, and the 10 de répertoire. He was also a jury member at distinguished competitions.

== Works ==
Compositions by Schlee include:

- Bild und Gleichnis, Op. 92 (2019–2020) for organ
- Das Gewand des Messias, Op. 91 (2018–2019) for piano trio
- Sancta Trinitas, unus Deus, Op. 90 (2018–2019) for organ
- Three Marches, two Trios, and a Waltz, Op. 88 (2015/17) for orchestra
- String Quartet No. 4, Op. 86 (2014–2015)
- Suite, Op. 82 (2012/13) for violin and piano
- Symphony No. 2, Op. 81 (2010/13) for large orchestra
- Aus meines Herzens Grunde, WoO (2012) for organ, in: The Orgelbüchlein Project
- Rufe zu mir, Op. 80 (2011–2012) for organ and large orchestra
- Horai, Op. 79 (2011–2012) for organ and chamber orchestra
- Was wir sind, Op. 77 (2010–2011), cantata for children's choir and orchestra
- Wachsende Bläue, Op. 76 (2010), for two solo violins and string ensemble
- String Trio, Op. 75 (2008–2011)
- 2 Psalms, Op. 74 (2004–2010) for organ
- Tränen, Op. 73 (2003–2009), nine dances for piano
- Spes unica, Op. 72 (2009) for orchestra
- Piano Concerto, Op. 70 (2008)
- Ich, Hiob, Op. 68 (2006–2007), church opera to a libretto by Christian Martin Fuchs
- Sinfonia tascabile, Op. 67 (2006) for orchestra
- Konzertoverture, Musik für ein Fest, Op. 64 (2005) for orchestra
- Missa, Op. 61 (2005) for baritone solo, mixed choir, brass, percussion, and organ
- Die schöne Lau, Op. 60 (2004) for soprano, speaker, and orchestra
- String Quartet No. 3 "Tempus Floridum", Op. 56 (2003)
- und ich sah, Op. 55 (2002–2003) oratorio for soloists, chorus, and ensemble
- Der Kreuzweg unseres Herrn und Heilandes, Op. 52 (2001) for organ and string orchestra
- Symphony No. 1, Op. 51 (2000–2001) for orchestra
- De Profundis, Op. 43 (2008) for viola and double bass
- Der Esel Hesékiël, Op. 46 (1998–1999) for narrator and orchestra
- Orchesterspiele, Op. 45 (1997–1998) for orchestra
- Sonata da Camera, Op. 42 (1996–1997) for chamber orchestra
- Licht, Farben, Schatten, Op. 38 (1995–1996) for ensemble
- Concertino, Op. 36 (1995) for two piccolo trumpets (or oboes) and string orchestra
- Wacht auf, Harfe und Saitenspiel, Op. 35 (1994–1995) for harp and string orchestra
- Der Baum des Heils, Op. 33 (1993–1994), oratorio
- Aurora, Op. 32 (1992–1993) for orchestra
- Ricercar, Op. 31 (1990–1992) for orchestra
- Cinq Pièces, Op. 29 (1990–1992) for organ
- Das Feuer des Herrn, Op. 27 (1989) cantata for soloists, children's chorus, and chamber orchestra
- Alba, Op. 26 (1986), for flute and viola
- String Quartet No. 2, Op. 21 (1983–1985, rev. 1997)
- ... und mit einer Stimme rufen, Op. 20 (1987) for orchestra

== Awards ==
Awards and honours for Schlee included:

- 1979: Theodor Körner Prize
- 1980: Scholarship from the city of Vienna
- 1982:
  - Förderungspreis for music from the city of Vienna
  - Prix du concours international de Saint-Rémy-de-Provence
- 1983: First prize in the composition competition of the Berliner Liedertafel
- 1985: Laureate of the composition competition of Erding
- 1989: Laureate of the organ composition competition "Olivier Messiaen" Bologna
- 1990: Chevalier of the Order of Arts and Letters
- 1997: Joaquin Rodrigo Medal
- 1998: Culture Prize for music of Upper Austria
- 2002: Church Music Prize from the city of Neuss
- 2003: Förderungspreis for Music of the Federal Chancellery of Austria
- 2010: Österreichischer Kunstpreis für Musik
- 2012: Austrian Decoration for Science and Art
- 2015: Ehrenzeichen des Landes Kärnten of Carinthia
- 2017, 2018: Förderungspreis for Music of the Federal Chancellery of Austria
- 2021: Scholarship of the Federal ministry of art and culture

== Recordings ==
- Cech. Ligeti. Schlee, ORF CD 46 (1995): Ricercar
- Meisterliche Konzerte, DD Records CD DD945182 (1996): Wacht auf, Harfe und Saitenspiel
- Das Spiel mit der Oboe, Weinberg Records CD SW 010058-2 (1997): Aulodie et Jubilation
- Der Baum des Heils, Extraplatte CD EX 320-2 (1997)
- Aurora, Extraplatte CD EX-SP 020-2 (2002): Licht, Farbe Schatten, Quia tu es Deus fortitudo mea, Alba, Wacht auf, Harfe und Saitenspiel, Aurora
- New Music from Austria IV, ORF Edition Zeitton CD 325 (2003): Orchesterspiele
- Reine Gegenwart, ORF Edition Zeitton CD 329 (2003)
- Missa op. 61, CD Domradio Köln (2005)
- Vom Abend zum Morgen, Audiomax 703 1545-2 (2009)
- Thomas Daniel Schlee: Organ Works, played by Pier Damiano Peretti at the Cavaillé-Coll organ of the Trinité in Paris, Ambiente-Audio ACD-2030 (2013): Préludes, Op. 6 / I, II, IV, VII, IX, XI, Fantaisie, Op. 15, 2 Psalms, Op. 74
