= Milan Horvat =

Croatian conductor

Milan Horvat (28 July 1919 – 1 January 2014) was a Croatian conductor.

== Biography ==
Horvat was born in Pakrac. He studied with Igor Markevitch and started his professional career in 1946 with the Radio Symphony Orchestra Zagreb, followed in 1953 by the post of chief conductor of the National Symphony Orchestra in Dublin (RTÉ National Symphony Orchestra) for five years.

He was Chief Conductor, Managing Director, Principal Guest Conductor, and since 1985 Lifetime Honorary Chief Conductor of the Zagreb Philharmonic Orchestra, with many performances in Salzburg, Venice, Marseille, Geneva, Vienna, Graz and the USA among others. He was also chief conductor of the Opera Zagreb (Croatian National Theatre in Zagreb) for ten years.

From 1970 on, he held master classes at the summer academy in Salzburg. He was Honorary Conductor of the Orchestre de Chambre de Lausanne, and from 1981 the Principal Guest Conductor and the Honorary Member of the Slovenian Philharmonic. He worked with some of the world's greatest soloists, such as Mstislav Rostropovich, David Oistrakh, Yehudi Menuhin and Arturo Benedetti Michelangeli.

From 1969 until 1975, he was head of the newly created Vienna Radio Symphony Orchestra. Subsequently until his retirement in 1989 he taught a class for orchestral conducting at the University of Music in Graz/Austria; among his pupils were Fabio Luisi, Richard Hein, Michele Trenti and Gerhard Präsent. From 1997 until 2000 he was chief conductor of the Graz Symphonic Orchestra.

After his retirement from University duties (1989) he conducted orchestras across Europe in cities such as Berlin, Rome, Salzburg, and Lisbon.

Many of his performances have been released on CD, including Dvořák's fourth and eighth symphonies, with the Austrian Radio Symphony Orchestra, on the Excelsior label; and Rachmaninoff's third piano concerto with David Helfgott as soloist with the Copenhagen Philharmonic Orchestra on the RCA Victor label.

Horvat died in Innsbruck, Austria, aged 95.

Cultural offices
Preceded by none	Principal Conductors, Vienna Radio Symphony Orchestra; 1969–1975	Succeeded by Leif Segerstam
