= Richard Bletschacher =

German writer, and dramatic advisor

Richard Max Josef Bletschacher (born October 23, 1936, in Füssen, Bavaria) is a German writer, and dramatic advisor.

Bletschacher studied law, philosophy, and literature in Munich, Heidelberg, Paris, and Vienna, without acquiring a degree. From 1982 to 1996, he was a chief dramatic advisor at Vienna State Opera. He wrote and translated libretti, spectacles, lyrics, novellas, children's books, and academic texts on music.

Richard Bletschacher lives in Vienna, and Drosendorf an der Thaya.

== See also ==
- Russian opera articles
- Alfred Schnittke
- Kurt Schwertsik
- Heinz Karl Gruber
