= Kristine Tornquist =

Austrian librettist, director and sculptor

Kristine Tornquist (born 1965 in Graz) is an Austrian librettist, director and visual artist. She and her partner Jury Everhartz co-founded the sirene Operntheater in Vienna.

She was born in Graz, grew up in Linz, and trained as a goldsmith. She has a diploma (1994) from the University of Applied Arts Vienna, where she studied under Ron Arad.

She has written about 50 opera librettos. She began to work with Jury Everhartz in 1998 and in 2002 they founded the sirene Operntheater which has since premiered 86 new works (2025).
