= Die reihe =

Austrian chamber music ensemble

die reihe
- Ensemble for contemporary music
- Founded: 1958 by Friedrich Cerha and Kurt Schwertsik
- Disbanded: 2019
- Location: Vienna, Austria
- Website: www.diereihe.at

die reihe (the row) is a chamber music ensemble, founded by Friedrich Cerha and Kurt Schwertsik in Vienna in 1958. It became a leading ensemble for the interpretation of contemporary music, especially by composers of the Second Viennese School. The name alludes to the tone row of twelve-tone technique. The ensemble held a last concert in 2019.

== History and program ==
Friedrich Cerha and Kurt Schwertsik founded in Vienna in 1958 an ensemble, die reihe, as part of the Wiener Konzertgesellschaft. The ensemble was named after the tone row of twelve-tone technique. It was dedicated to playing contemporary chamber music, new works and music by composers of the Second Viennese School, especially by Arnold Schönberg, Alban Berg and Anton Webern. The ensemble played music from various style composed since 1900, with a focus on music written after 1945.

The first concert was given on 22 March 1959. From the early 1960s, the ensemble held concert series in Vienna and also regularly played at international festivals of contemporary music, such as Berlin Biennale, Holland Festival, Warsaw Autumn, Steirischer Herbst, the Biennale Musica in Venice, the Music Biennale Zagreb, musica viva in Munich, Neues Werk in Hamburg, and Musik der Zeit in Cologne.

Cerha conducted the ensemble initially. HK Gruber, the ensemble's double bassist from 1961, became artistic director in 1983. Many players were members of the RSO Wien. They worked with notable composers and conductors.

Several compositions were written for the ensemble; 146 works were premiered among 2200 performed works. The ensemble made many recordings, also for radio and television. The ensemble shaped the Austrian music scene. They disbanded in 2019, with a concert and talk at the Konzerthaus Wien as part of the Wien Modern festival.
