= Concerto da camera =

Musical term

Concerto da camera, or in English chamber concerto, originally was one of the two types of concerto grosso, the other being the concerto da chiesa ("church concert"). The concerto da camera had the character of a suite, being introduced by a prelude and incorporating popular dance forms. Antonio Vivaldi and Georg Philipp Telemann were great exponents of this form of music. Later it became a popular name for any concerto in a chamber music or chamber orchestra setting.

== Chamber concertos referring to the original concerto da camera concept ==
Among better known, non-baroque pieces with the name concerto da camera are:

- Charles-Valentin Alkan, Concerto da camera in A minor
- Howard Hanson, Concerto da Camera for piano and string quartet in C, Op 7 (1917)
- Jacques Ibert, Concertino da camera for saxophone and eleven instruments (1935)
- Bohuslav Martinu, Concerto da camera for violin and string orchestra with piano and percussion (1941)
- Arthur Vincent Lourié, Concerto da camera, for violin & orchestra (1947)
- Arthur Honegger, Concerto da camera, for flute, English horn and strings (1948)
- George Dyson, Concerto da Camera for string orchestra (1949)
- Peter Mieg, Concerto da Camera for strings, piano and timpani (1952)
- James Cohn, Concerto da Camera for violin, wind quintet, and piano (1962)
- Fernando Lopes-Graça, Concerto da Camera col Violoncello Obbligato (1965)
- Ahmed Adnan Saygun, Concerto da Camera, Op. 62 (1978)
- Michael Hurd, Concerto da Camera for oboe & strings (1979)
- Krzysztof Meyer, Concerto da camera for cello & orchestra ("Canti Amadei"), Op. 63, (1984)
- Shulamit Ran, Concerto da camera II, for clarinet, 3 violins, cello & piano (1985)
