= Oberhofen am Irrsee =

- Municipality
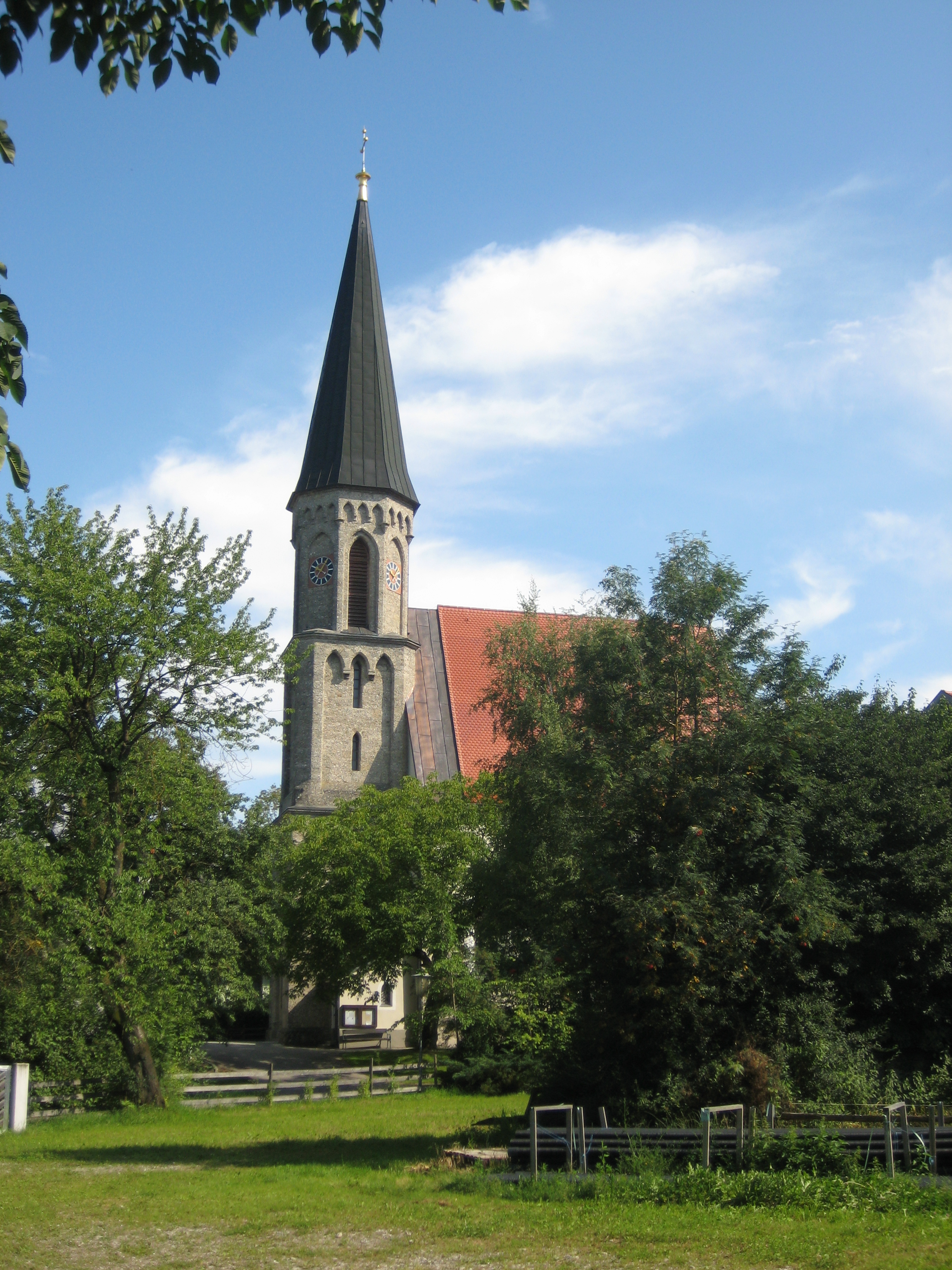

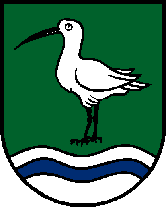
- Coat of arms

- Location within Austria
- Coordinates: 47°57′01″N 13°18′02″E
- Country: Austria
- State: Upper Austria
- District: Vöcklabruck

Government
  - Mayor: Elisabeth Höllwarth-Kaiser (ÖVP)

Area
  - Total: 21.19 km^{2} (8.18 sq mi)
- Elevation: 573 m (1,880 ft)

Population (2018-01-01)
  - Total: 1,646
  - Density: 77.68/km^{2} (201.2/sq mi)
- Time zone: UTC+1 (CET)
  - Summer (DST): UTC+2 (CEST)
- Postal code: 4894
- Area code: 06213
- Vehicle registration: VB

Oberhofen am Irrsee is a municipality in the district of Vöcklabruck in the Austrian state of Upper Austria.

== Population ==
Historical population
Year	Pop.	±%
1991	1,145	—
2001	1,335	+16.6%
2016	1,588	+19.0%
