= Friedrich Cerha =

Austrian composer and conductor (1926–2023)

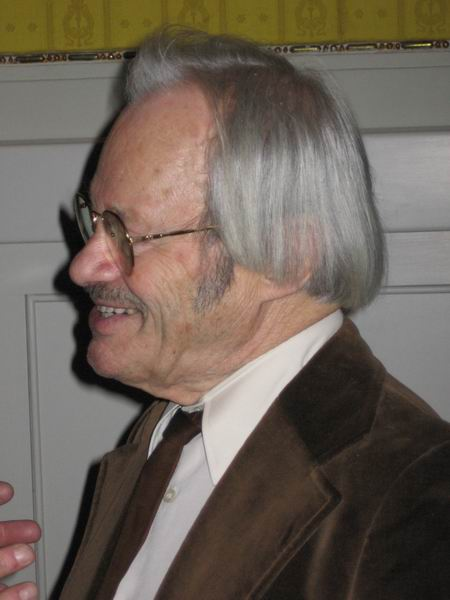
- Cerha in 2006
- Born: 17 February 1926; Vienna, Austria
- Died: 14 February 2023 (aged 96); Vienna, Austria
- Education: Vienna Music Academy; University of Vienna
- Occupations: Composer; conductor; academic teacher
- Organizations: die reihe; University of Music and Performing Arts Vienna
- Children: 2
- Awards: Austrian Decoration for Science and Art; Golden Lion; Ernst von Siemens Music Prize

Friedrich Cerha (German: [ˈfʁiːdʁɪç ˈt͜sɛʁha]; 17 February 1926 – 14 February 2023) was an Austrian composer, conductor, and academic teacher. His ensemble die reihe in Vienna was instrumental in spreading contemporary music in Austria. Cerha composed three literary operas, beginning with Baal, based on Brecht's play, which was premiered at the Salzburg Festival in 1981. He is best known for completing Alban Berg's opera Lulu by orchestrating its unfinished third act, which premiered in Paris in 1979.

== Life and career ==
Cerha was born in Vienna on 17 February 1926, the son of an electrical engineer. He played the violin at age six, instructed by Anton Pejhovsky, and began composing two years later. He played Viennese folk music on the violin in Vienna suburban cafes.

At 17, Cerha was drafted as a Luftwaffenhelfer in 1943, and initially served in Achau, near Vienna. During this time, he participated in a number of acts of resistance against the fascist regime. After a semester at the University of Vienna in 1944, studying musicology with Eric Schenk, philosophy and German, he was sent to an officer's school in occupied Denmark. While there, he obtained a number of blank, but signed, marching order papers and deserted. These papers allowed him to remain within German territory for some time as he could use them as proof that he was supposed to be there. However, after a period, he was forced to rejoin a military unit during an advance by the Soviet forces near Pomerania. He deserted a second time and made his way to the west of Austria, where he lived in the mountains for several months to avoid capture by the Allied forces, until he was eventually able to return to Vienna in November 1945. After the war, he worked as a mountain guide, to find distance from the past.

Cerha studied at the Vienna Music Academy from 1946, violin with Gottfried Feist and Váša Příhoda, composition with Alfred Uhl, and music pedagogy. Simultaneously, he continued his studies at the University of Vienna. His dissertation in German studies there, on the Turandot topic, was completed in 1950. As a student, he played concerts as a violinist. He searched for places to perform new music, and found only cafés, shops and cellar pubs; he realised later that friendships had developed in the process.

Cerha worked as a music and German teacher from 1950 to 1962, developing school orchestras in the early 1960s, while continuing work as a concert violinist. He attended the Darmstädter Ferienkurse from 1956 to 1958, where he experienced "the sense of a new era". He also attended courses with violinist Rudolf Kolisch and pianist Eduard Steuermann, who were experts on the Schoenberg school. After studying serialism further, he composed Relazioni fragili which was first performed in Darmstadt in 1958. He received a grant in 1957 that led to the composition of Espressioni fondamentali for orchestra, premiered in Berlin in 1960.

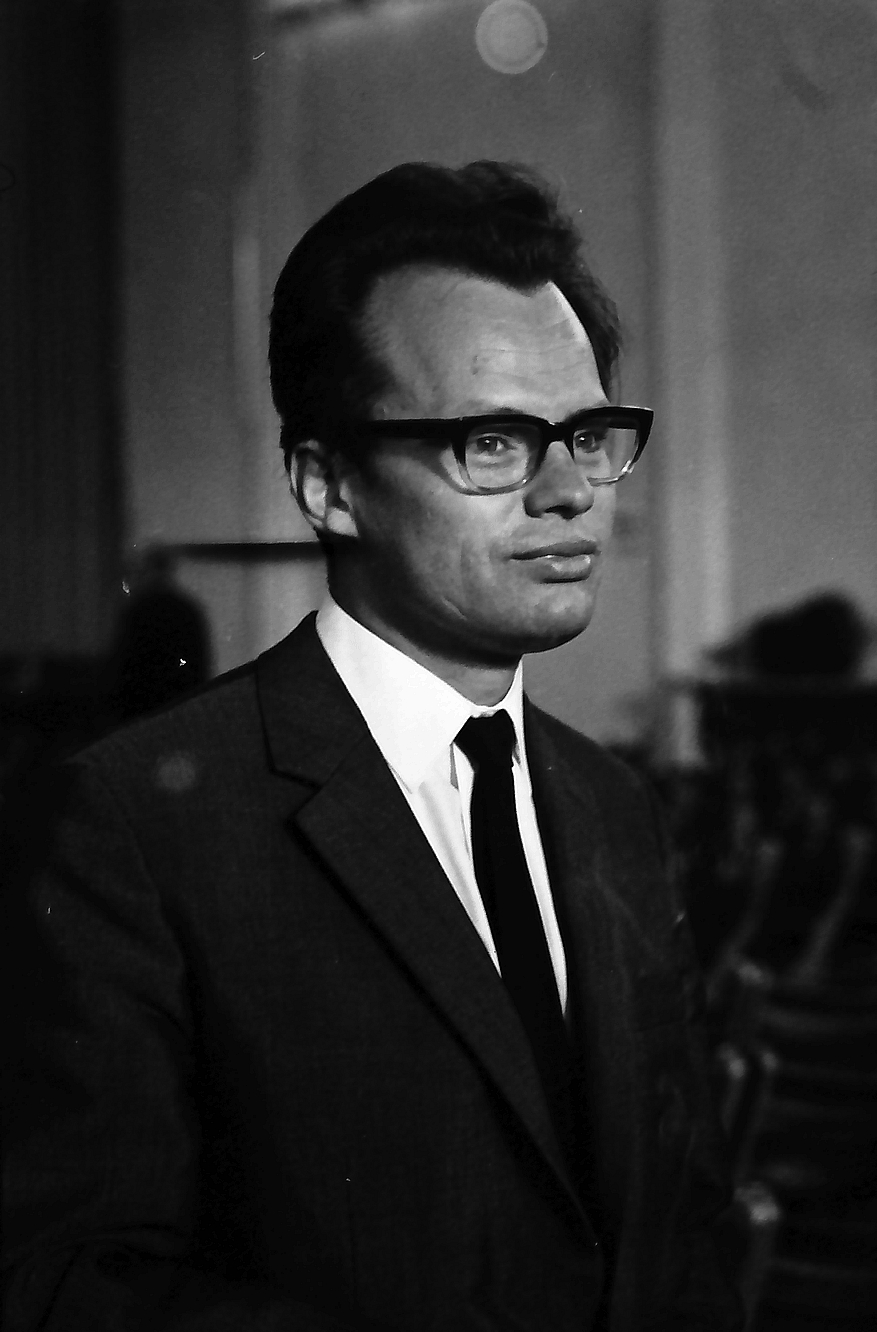
Cerha in 1964

In 1958 Cerha founded the ensemble die reihe together with Kurt Schwertsik, which was instrumental in spreading contemporary music in Austria. He also founded the Camerata Frescobaldiana for the performance of Renaissance music, editing music for their concerts. Cerha earned a reputation as an interpreter of the works of Alban Berg, Arnold Schoenberg, and Anton Webern. He was recognised internationally as a composer when Relazioni fragili was performed at the 1961 ISCM festival in Vienna, and increasingly conducted contemporary music at leading festivals and opera houses.

He began studies of the unfinished third act of Berg's opera Lulu in 1962. Cerha orchestrated sections of the third act using Berg's notes as a reference. The complete three-act opera was premiered by Pierre Boulez in Paris Opéra on 24 February 1979, and directed by Patrice Chéreau.

Alongside his career as a composer and conductor, Cerha taught from 1959 at the University of Music and Performing Arts Vienna, where he was professor of composition, notation, and interpretation of new music from 1976 to 1988. His students include Gerald Barry, Charles Boone, Benet Casablancas, Karlheinz Essl, Georg Friedrich Haas, Petr Kotik, and Thomas Pernes.

Cerha composed both orchestral works and operas. His first opera was Baal, based on Brecht's play of the same name, and influenced by Berg's Wozzeck. It was premiered at the Salzburg Festival in 1981, with performances at the Vienna State Opera and a production at the Staatsoper Berlin in 1982. It was followed by Der Rattenfänger and Der Riese vom Steinfeld, the latter commissioned by the Vienna State Opera, with a libretto by Peter Turrini, and premiered in 2002. Cerha began a cycle Spiegel (Mirror) in 1960 which over decades became regarded as one of his key works. He continued to compose into his old age, saying that he was fascinated by the "unfathomable" and mystery at the core of music. He stated: "I only sit down at my desk to write the first note when I know what the last one will be."

Cerha and his wife Gertraud, a music historian, were founding members of the Joseph Marx Society in April 2006. The couple had two children.

Cerha died in Vienna on 14 February 2023, at age 96.

== Awards ==
- 1964: Theodor Körner Prize
- 1986: Grand Austrian State Prize for Music
- 1986: Gold Medal of the Province of Styria
- 1986: Honorary Medal of Vienna in gold
- 1988: Honorary Member of the Vienna Konzerthaus
- 2005: Austrian Decoration for Science and Art
- 2006: Golden Lion of the Biennale Musica in Venice
- 2007: Honorary Member of the Society of Friends of Music in Vienna
- 2008: Gold Medal for services to the region of Vienna
- 2010: Silver Commander's Cross of Honour for Services to the province of Lower Austria
- 2011: Salzburg Music Prize
- 2012: Ernst von Siemens Music Prize

=== Honorary doctorates ===
- 2017: University of Siegen

== Works ==
Cerha's compositions were published by Universal Edition, including:

=== Operas ===
- Netzwerk, 1981 for singers, reciter, movement groups and orchestra
- Baal, 1974/81 – text: Bertolt Brecht
- Der Rattenfänger, 1987 – text: Carl Zuckmayer
- Completion of the opera Lulu by Alban Berg, 1962–78
- Der Riese vom Steinfeld, 2002 – text: Peter Turrini, 2002
- Onkel Präsident, 2013 – text: Peter Wolf and Cerha

=== Other works ===
- Spiegel I, 1960 for movement groups, light objects, orchestra, and tape
- Spiegel II–VII, 1960–72
- Sinfonie, 1975
- Requiem für Hollensteiner, Text: Thomas Bernhard 1982/83, dedicated to Kurt Ohnsorg, commissioned by Austrian Musical Youth for the 25th anniversary of the Vienna Youth Choir.
- Baal-Gesänge, 1983
- Keintate I, II, 1983 ff.
- Monumentum für Karl Prantl, 1988
- Introitus and Kyrie of Requiem of Reconciliation, 1995
- Fünf Stücke for clarinet in A, cello and piano, 1999–2000
- Concerto for Soprano Saxophone and Orchestra, 2003–2004
- Violin Concerto, 2004
- Oboe Quintet, 2007
- Percussion Concerto, 2007–2008
- Like a Tragicomedy for orchestra, 2008–2009
- Bruchstück, geträumt for ensemble, 2009
- Paraphrase of the beginning of Beethoven's Symphony No. 9, 2010
- Zebra-Trio for string trio, 2011
- Tagebuch for orchestra, 2012
- Drei Sätze für Orchester, 2015
- Fasce for orchestra, before 1993
- Langegger Nachtmusiken I-III, before 1993
- Relazioni fragili for chamber ensemble, before 1993

== See also ==
- List of Austrians in music
