= Wolfram Wagner =

Austrian composer and flautist

Wolfram Wagner (born 28 September 1962 in Vienna) is an Austrian composer and flautist. He graduated from the University of Music in Vienna, Guildhall School of Music and Drama in London and the Frankfurt Conservatory. In 1992 he was appointed professor of harmony and counterpoint at the University of Music in Vienna. He has also lectured at the Conservatory in Paris and at Amsterdam and Greensboro Universities.

As of 2012, Wagner has composed three operas, one ballet, three oratorios and several orchestral works. One of his best received works has been Fantasie No.1 for flute and cello. He has also recorded "Secundum Scripturas" with the mixed Vienna Chamber Choir. To celebrate his 50th birthday, in September 2012, Wagner put on a special concert at the ACF London with Holger Busch, Jörg Wachsenegger and Gerhard Waiz (TRIS), playing trios Mozart's Kegelstatt Trio, Gestural Variations by Graham Waterhouse, Mark Anthony Turnage's Cortège for Chrisand, and a new work by Wagner.
