= Kurt Schwertsik =

Austrian composer

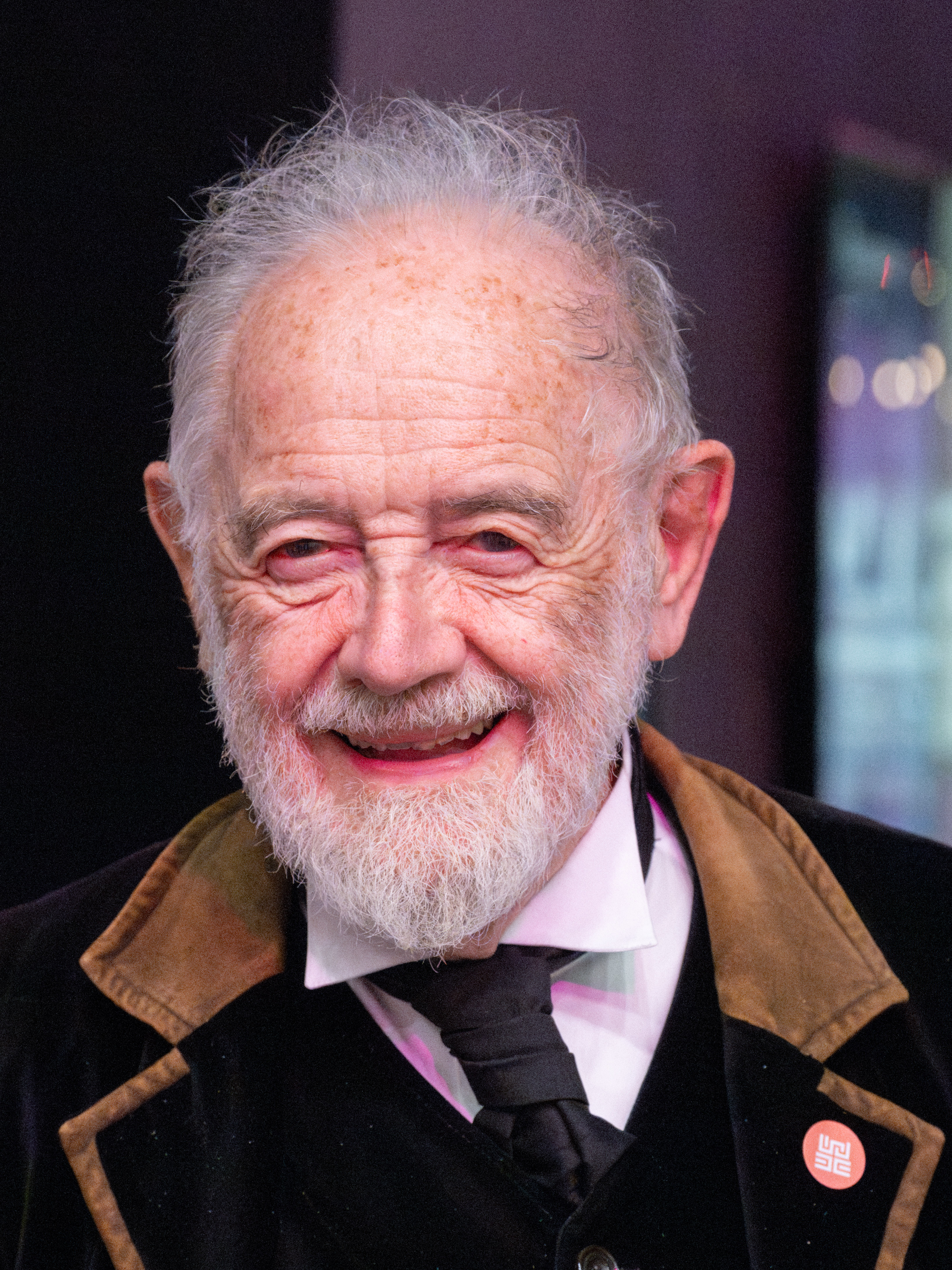
- Schwertsik in 2025
- Born: 25 June 1935 (age 91); Vienna, Austria
- Education: Vienna Music Academy
- Occupations: Composer; Hornist; Academic teacher
- Organizations: die reihe; Vienna Symphony Orchestra; Konservatorium Wien; Vienna Music Academy
- Awards: Grand Austrian State Prize; Austrian Decoration for Science and Art

Kurt Schwertsik (born 25 June 1935) is an Austrian composer, also a hornist and academic teacher. He is known for creating the Third Viennese School and spreading contemporary classical music.

== Life ==
Schwertsik was born in Vienna. A pupil of Joseph Marx and Karl Schiske at the Academy of Music, he later studied with Karlheinz Stockhausen in Cologne and Darmstadt. In 1958 he founded the ensemble die reihe with fellow composer and conductor Friedrich Cerha (famous for finishing the opera Lulu, by Alban Berg) and later, in 1968, the ensemble "MOB art & tone ART" with Otto Matthäus Zykan and Heinz Karl Gruber. He served as hornist of the Vienna Symphony Orchestra (from 1968) while teaching Composition at the Konservatorium Wien (from 1979). Between 1989 and 2004 he was Professor of Composition at the Vienna Musikhochschule (Academy of Music, when he was studying there, now called University of Music and Performing Arts, Vienna). His works are characterised by his particular exploration of tonality and his musical irony and humour. He received the Grand Austrian State Prize (1992), the Austrian Decoration for Science and Art (1997) and numerous other awards.

Kurt Schwertsik is President of the Joseph Marx Society that was founded in 2006 in order to implement the Renaissance of this composer. Thus, Schwertsik has accepted the position of the leader of an organisation for the first time in his career and also avowed himself a melodist according to the musical philosophy that was developed and represented by Joseph Marx.

Among his notable students is Lukas Ligeti.

== Prizes ==
- City of Vienna Prize for Music (1980)
- Grand Austrian State Prize for music (1992)
- Austrian Decoration for Science and Art (1997)
- Silver Medal for Service to the City of Vienna (2006)

== Works (selection) ==
=== Instrumental music ===
Orchestral works

- ... für Audifax und Abachum, symphony for large orchestra, op.8 (1963–70)
- Draculas Haus- und Hofmusik, a Transylvanian symphony for strings, op.18 (1968)
- Symphonie im MOB-Stil for orchestra, op.19 (1971)
- Epilog zu Rosamunde, op.33 (1978)
- Tag- und Nachtweisen; Im Ton des Mönchs von Salzburg und Herrn Marteins, op.34 (1978)
- Irdische Klänge Cycle (1980–1992), comprising:
  - Irdische Klänge, Symphony in 2 movements, op.37 (1980)
  - Fünf Naturstücke, Der Irdischen Klänge 2. Teil, op.45 (1983–84)
  - Mit den Riesenstiefeln, op.60 (1991)
  - Uluru, op.64 (1992)
- Baumgesänge, op.65 (1992)
- Sinfonia-Sinfonietta, op.73 (1996)
- 'Mond-Lichtung for string orchestra, op.75 (1997)
- Unter Messing Baumen for 4 natural horns and orchestra, op.77 (1998)
- Nachtmusiken

Music for solo instrument and orchestra

- Alphorn Concerto ‘'In Keltischer Manier’’, op.27 (1975)
- Violin Concerto No. 1, op.31 (1977)
- Guitar Concerto, op.35 (1979)
- Instant Music for flute and wind orchestra, op.40 (1981)
- Timpani Concerto, op.54 (1987–88)
- Double-Bass Concerto, op.56 (1989)
- Violin Concerto No. 2
- Flute Concerto
- Trombone Concerto

=== Stage music ===
- Der lange Weg zur großen Mauer – Opera based on a novel by Richard Bletschacher, op.24 (1974)
- Wiener Chronik 1848, ballet op.28 (1976–77, originally performed as Walzerträume; written for the Cologne City Opera)
- Katzelmacher – Opera based on a text by Rainer Werner Fassbinder
- Fanferlieschen Schönefüßchen – Fairy-tale opera after Clemens Brentano, based on a text by Karin and Thomas Körner, op.42 (1982)
- Das verlorene Wut, Singspiel for TV based on a text by Christine Nöstlinger, op.57 (1989)
- Der ewige Frieden, operetta on a text by Thomas Korner, op.58 (1990)
- Frida Kahlo, dance-theatre work (1991)
- Café-Museum – Die Erleuchtung, chamber opera, op.67 (1993)
- Die Welt der Mongolen, opera based on a text by Michael Köhlmeier, op.72 (1996)
- Schlaf der Gerechten, operella based on a text by Kristine Tornquist (sirene Operntheater, 2004)
- Chalifa und die Affen, chamber opera based on a text by Kristine Tornquist from Arabian Nights (sirene Operntheater, 2011)
- Alice, phantastic revue based on Alice in Wonderland by Lewis Carroll, text editor Kristine Tornquist (sirene Operntheater, 2023)

=== Vocal music ===
- shâl-i-mâr for baritone and orchestra, op.17 (1962–72) to texts by H.C. Artmann
- Starckdeutsche Lieder und Tänze for baritone and orchestra, op.44 (1982) to texts by Matthias Koeppel
- Human existence for voice and chamber ensemble (1992), texts by Flann O'Brien
- Die Furie des Verschwindens for mixed choir
- Roald Dahl’s Goldilocks for narrator and orchestra, op.74 (1996), text by Donald Sturrock after Roald Dahl
- a huge number of songs

=== Chamber music ===
- Liebesträume for 7 instruments, op.7 (1962)
- Eichendorff-Quintett for wind quintet, op.9 (1964)
- 5 Nocturnes for cello and piano, op.10c (1966)
- Music vom Mutterland Mu for 11 instruments, op.22 (1974)
- Skizzen und Entwürfe for string quartet, op.25 (1974)
- Twilight Music, A Celtic Serenade for Octet, op. 30 (1976)
- Blechpartie im neuesten Geschmack for brass quintet, op.43 (1982)
- Am Ende Steht ein Marsch for wind octet, op. 59 (1991)
- Drei späte Liebeslieder for cello and piano, op.66 (1992)
- Mobelmusik-Klassisch for 2 violins, viola and double bass, op.68 (1994; also version for string orchestra)
- Wake for string quartet, op.70 (1994)
- Adieu Satie for bandoneon and string quartet
- Ganesha Walkabout for string quartet, op.76 (1998)
- Sotto Voce for 4 instruments, Op. 39 (Flute, Violin, 'cello & Guitar) (1980)

=== Solo instrumental ===
- 5 Nocturnes for piano, op.10a
- Ein Kleines Requiem, op.97
