= Styriarte =

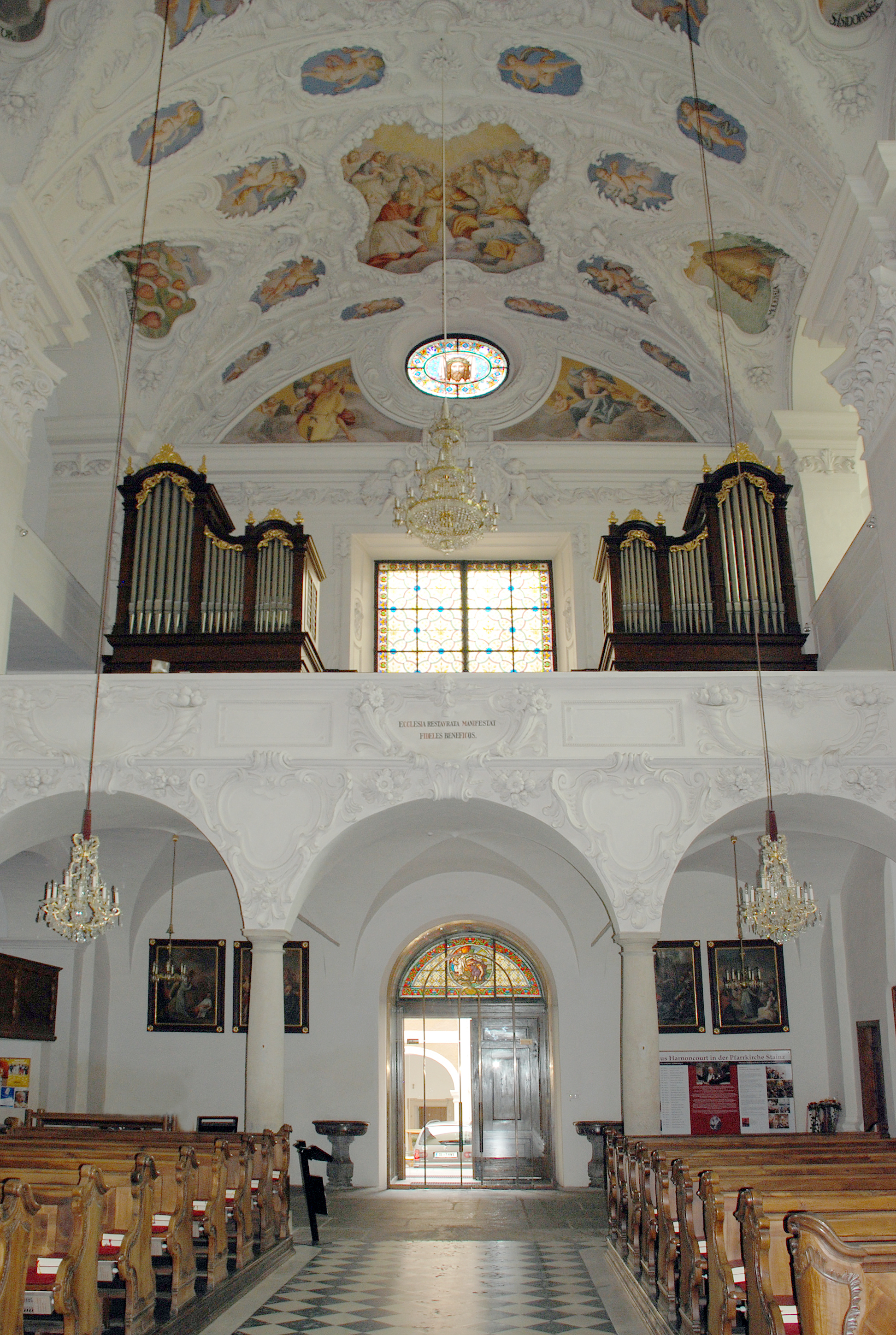
- Organ loft of the Pfarrkirche in Stainz, one of the venues of the festival
- Genre: classical music
- Frequency: annual
- Locations: Graz and Styria
- Inaugurated: 1985; 41 years ago
- People: Nikolaus Harnoncourt; Jordi Savall
- Website: www.styriarte.com

Styriarte (also written styriarte) is an annual summer festival of classical music in Graz and Styria, Austria, established in 1985. It is focused on Early music, Baroque music and music of the Classical period. Intended to showcase the work of Nikolaus Harnoncourt in his hometown, it grew to locations in the region and survived his death.

== History ==
Kurt Jungwirth, as Kulturlandesrat responsible for cultural politics in the state of Styria, wanted to tie conductor Nikolaus Harnoncourt closer to his hometown Graz. The focus of the first Styriarte was Johann Sebastian Bach, with Harnoncourt's Concentus Musicus Wien playing a leading role. The festival was directed by Andrea Herberstein and Wolfgang Schuster, a member of the Wiener Philharmoniker. The first festival was staged in the summer of 1985.

In 1987, Harnoncourt also conducted the Chamber Orchestra of Europe. The event Ein Fest für Haydn (A feast for Haydn) in Schloss Eggenberg became a success with the audience. In 1988, Christopher Widauer succeeded Herberstein. A year later, the baroque church of Stainz was the first festival venue outside Graz, where Harnoncourt conducted concerts with the Concentus Musicus and the Arnold Schoenberg Chor. In 1991, Mathis Huber succeeded Widauer. In 1992, the focus changed from one composer per year to a motto. Jordi Savall became another internationally known conductor performing for the festival.

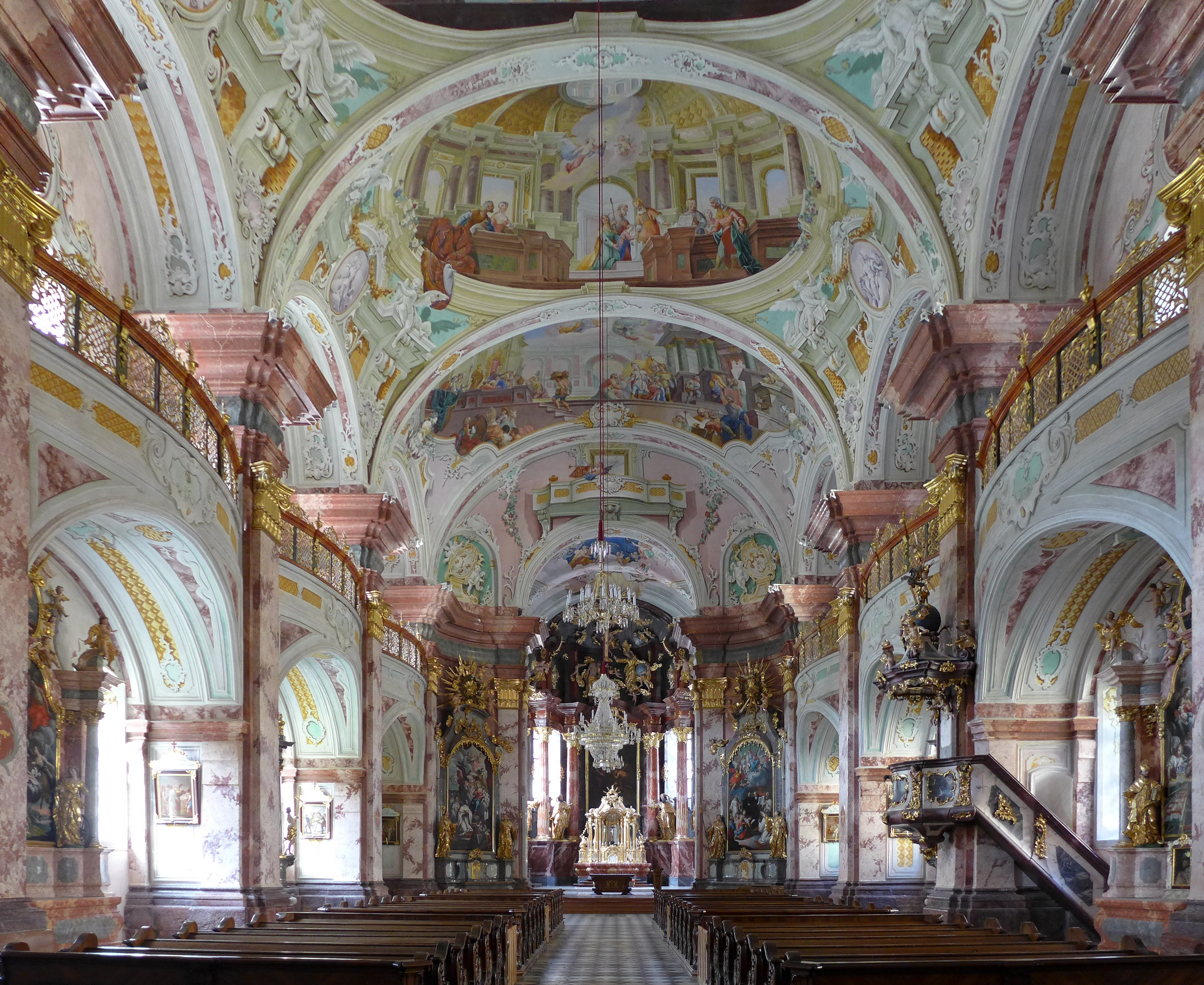
Interior of the church of Stift Rein

Venues of the festival were later also the Römersteinbruch (Roman quarry) in Wagna, Saint Lambert's Abbey, Rein Abbey and other locations in Styria, including the newly opened Helmut List Hall from 2003, and the Freilichtmuseum Stübing from 2007. In 2005, a staged production of Bizet's Carmen with Harnoncourt received international attention. From 2007, when the motto was Wanted: Europa, the broadcaster ORF aired concerts live. From 2008 the festival followed the model of the Bayreuth Festival and the Metropolitan Opera in New York, offering "public viewing"; the first work presented was Mozart's Coronation Mass with Harnoncourt in the parish church of Stainz.

== Performers ==
Leading performers of the festival have included, besides Harnoncourt and Savalli, the Quatuor Mosaiques, Armonico Tributo Austria and Il Giardino Armonico.

After Harnoncourt's death in 2016, conductors Karina Canellakis, Andrés Orozco-Estrada and Jeremie Rhorer appeared in 2016, sharing the planned project to present all Beethoven Symphonies. The number of symphony concerts was reduced from eleven to seven, while the tickets sold stayed almost the same, at 33.000 for 64 events, more than 90% of the available seats.
