= Iván Erőd =

Hungarian-Austrian composer and pianist (1936–2019)

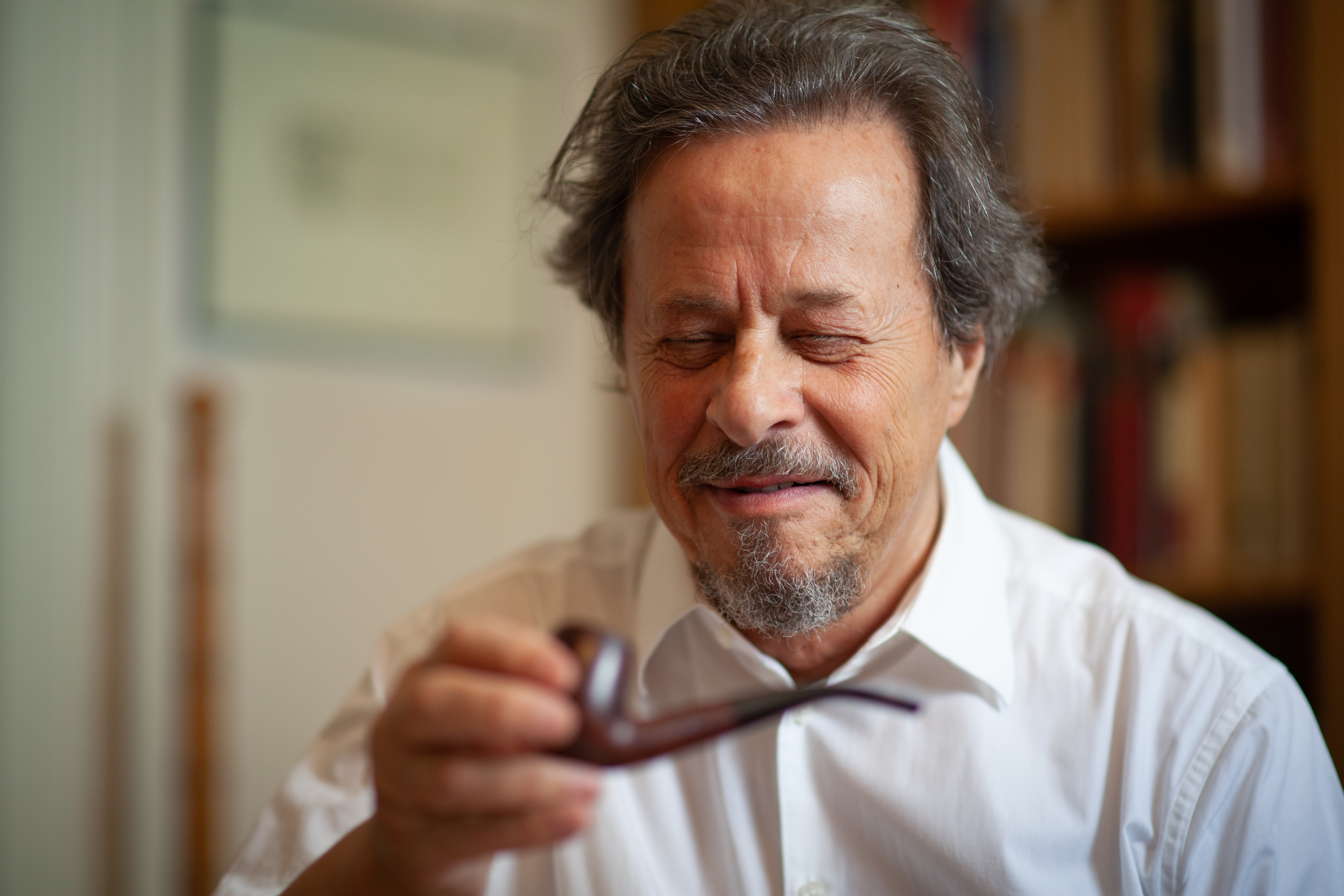
- in June 2011
- Born: Erőd Iván; 2 January 1936; Budapest, Hungary
- Died: 24 June 2019 (aged 83); Vienna, Austria
- Education: Franz Liszt Academy of Music
- Occupations: Composer; Pianist; Academic teacher
- Organizations: Franz Liszt Academy of Music; University of Music and Performing Arts Graz
- Awards: Ferruccio Busoni International Piano Competition; Decoration of Honour for Services to the Republic of Austria

Iván Erőd (Hungarian: Erőd Iván [ˈɛrøːd ˈivaːn]; 2 January 1936 – 24 June 2019; sometimes spelled Eröd) was a Hungarian-Austrian composer and pianist. Educated in Budapest, he emigrated to Austria in 1956, where he studied at the Vienna Music Academy. He was successful as a pianist and composer of operas, chamber music and much more, with elements from serialism, Hungarian folk music and jazz. He first was a professor of music theory and composition at the University of Music and Performing Arts Graz (1967–1989), then a professor of composition at the Vienna Music Academy from 1989.

== Career ==
Born in Budapest, Erőd studied at the Franz Liszt Academy of Music with Pál Kadosa (piano) and Ferenc Szabó (composition). He emigrated to Austria in 1956 and studied there at the Vienna Music Academy, with Richard Hauser (piano) and Karl Schiske (composition). He received diplomas in piano and composition in 1961. He took several summer classes at the Darmstädter Ferienkurse, studying with Eduard Steuermann and Luigi Nono. In 1960 he launched a career as a pianist, playing in Europe and the Near East.

From 1962 to 1968 he was a solo répétiteur at the Vienna State Opera and the Wiener Festwochen. From 1967 to 1989 he taught music theory and composition at the University of Music and Performing Arts Graz, and later taught at the Vienna Music Academy, first as a guest teaching Tonsatz (harmony and counterpoint), and from 1989 as a professor. His students included Christian Utz, Nayden Todorov, Johanna Doderer, Patricia Kopatchinskaja, Olga Neuwirth, Kirill Petrenko, Johannes Maria Staud, and Judit Varga.

== Life ==
Erőd's brother and grandparents were murdered at Auschwitz in 1944. He fled Hungary after the events of 1956. He married in 1969 and had five children, among them Adrian, a baritone, and Leonard, a bassoonist at the Vienna Radio Symphony Orchestra. He died of complications from a stroke in Vienna on 24 June 2019.

== Works ==
Stylistically, Erőd's music was initially influenced by Hungarians such as Béla Bartók and Zoltán Kodály. Before his emigration and during his studies in Vienna, he was interested in the dodecaphony of the "Second Viennese School", and serialism. His wind trio, Op. 4 (1957, revised 1987), and his Ricercare ed Aria, Op. 11, for wind quartet (1965) are based on twelve-tone structures, as is his first opera, Das Mädchen, der Matrose und der Student (The Girl, the Sailor and the Student, 1960). He began composing his second opera Die Seidenraupen (The Silkworms) in 1964 and completed it in 1968, when it was successfully premiered during the Wiener Festwochen at the Theater an der Wien with singers Jeannette Pilou and Oskar Czerwenka.

The composer describes the work as being based on three scales, for the three main characters, which are derived from each other and sometimes combined in a way leading to tonality. His first violin sonata, Op. 14 (1969/70), was a return to a "new tonality", incorporating Hungarian and "gypsy" elements. He dedicated Milchzahnlieder (Baby Tooth Songs) for soprano and chamber orchestra, Op. 17 (1973), and Krokodilslieder (Crocodile Songs), for baritone and chamber orchestra, Op. 28 (1979), to his five children. Erőd composed orchestral works, such as a violin concerto, Op. 15 (1973), a viola concerto, Op. 30 (1979/80), a cello concerto, Op. 80, premiered 2005 at the festival styriarte, a clarinet concerto, Op. 88 (2011), as well as a double concerto for clarinet and bassoon, Op. 72 (1999), Soirées imaginaires, Op. 38 (1981), the Symphonie "From the Old World", Op. 67 (1995). and the 2nd Symphonie, Op. 75 (2001).

His children's opera Pünktchen und Anton, based on a popular novel by Erich Kästner from 1931, was first given in 2010 at the Children's Opera Tent of the Vienna State Opera. Cologne Opera presented the first performance in Germany in February, 2021, following COVID-19 protocols required at the time. The Cologne performance was video-recorded and streamed.

His chamber music includes three string quartets, Opp. 18, 26 and 78, two string sextets, Opp. 45 and 68, and Bukolika for chamber ensemble, Op. 64 (1994), on Hungarian rural life. His first piano trio, Op. 21, was written in 1976, his second trio Op. 42 in 1982; he wrote a trio for clarinet, violin and piano Op. 59 – commissioned by the Verdehr Trio – in 1991, as well as a piano quartet Op. 54 in 1987; the two sonatas for violin and piano Op. 14 (1970) and Op. 74 (2000) are among the most popular of his works. He composed lieder, such as Canti di Ungaretti (1988) and "Vier Gesänge" Op. 44. The song cycle Über der Asche zu singen, Op. 65 (1994) reflects his family's persecution when he was a child.

In the 1970s and 1980s he was influenced by Jazz and Blues, which shows in his piano concerto, Op. 19, in the second piano trio, Op. 42 (1981/82), and in the Minnesota Sinfonietta, Op. 51. Some of his vocal works are more serious, such as the Vier Gesänge, Op. 44 (1983), the song cycle Schwarzerde (Black Soil) for baritone and orchestra, Op. 49 (1984/85), and the cantata Vox Lucis (Voice of the Light), Op. 56 (1988/89).

== Awards ==
- 1962: Ferruccio Busoni International Piano Competition, Third Prize
- 1970: Staatspreis für Musik
- 1981: Musikpreis des Landes Steiermark (Music Prize of Styria)
- 1986: Music Prize of Vienna
- 2001: Grand Decoration of Honour in Silver for Services to the Republic of Austria (= 7th Class)
- 2006: Honorary member of the Österreichischer Komponistenbund (Austrian Composers Association)
- 2019: Kennedy Center for the Performing Arts' Gold Medal in the Arts
