= Outstanding Artist Award for Music =

Austrian music award

The Outstanding Artist Award for Music is given annually by the Federal Chancellery of Austria for achievements that influence the current art scene. The prize is awarded as a category of the Outstanding Artist Awards. In total, the Outstanding Artists Awards are given in 14 categories. The predecessor award State Prize for Music (Staatspreis für Musik) was given from 1950 to 1970. In 2009, the award was named Outstanding Artist Award for Music.

== Recipients ==
This award was given as the Austrian State Prize for Music from 1950 to 1970, then from 1971 to 2009 as "promotion award for music" (Förderpreis für Musik).

- 1950 Armin Kaufmann
- 1951 Theodor Berger
- 1952 Hans Erich Apostel, Max Haager, Ernst Tittel, Karl Etti, Erich Romanovsky, Karl Schiske
- 1953 Paul Angerer, Erwin Miggl, Walter Andress, Alfred Uhl
- 1954 Anton Heiller, Leopold Matthias Walzel, Ernst L. Uray, Cesar Bresgen
- 1955 Fritz Skorzeny
- 1956 no award
- 1957 Franz Hasenöhrl, Waldemar Bloch, Konrad Stekl
- 1958 Walter Pach
- 1959 Richard Winter, Marcel Rubin, Reinhold Schmid
- 1960 no award
- 1961 Thomas Christian David, Robert Schollum
- 1962 Helmut Eder, Walther Nußgruber
- 1963 Fritz Leitermayer, Jenő Takács
- 1964 Paul Kont, Augustinus Franz Kropfreiter, Franz Burkhart
- 1965 Fridolin Dallinger
- 1966 Kurt Schmidek
- 1967 Josef Friedrich Doppelbauer, Gerhard Wimberger
- 1968 Cesar Bresgen
- 1969 Augustin Kubizek
- 1970 Karl Heinz Füssl, Iván Erőd, Irmfried Radauer
- 1971 Friedrich Cerha
- 1972 Horst Ebenhöh, Alfred Mitterhofer, Ferdinand Weiss
- 1973 Josef Maria Horváth
- 1974 Carl Colman
- 1975 Heinz Karl Gruber, Erik Freitag
- 1976 Richard Kittler, Michael Rot
- 1977 Dieter Gaisbauer
- 1978 Herbert Schwendinger
- 1979 Andor Losonczy, Otto M. Zykan
- 1980 Richard Heller
- 1981 Werner Schulze
- 1982 no award
- 1983 Paul Engel
- 1984 Gerhard Schedl
- 1985 Gerhard E. Winkler
- 1986 Meinhard Rüdenauer, Herbert Willi
- 1987 Franz Koglmann, Wolfgang Mitterer
- 1988 Haimo Wisser
- 1989 Richard Dünser, Wilhelm Zobl
- 1990 Gerhard Kühr, Herbert Lauermann, Franz Thürauer
- 1991 Peter Planyavsky, Michael Radulescu
- 1992 Maximilian Kreuz, Gerhard Präsent
- 1993 Max Nagl, Wolfgang Reisinger
- 1994 Josef Klammer
- 1995 Georg Friedrich Haas, Thomas Larcher
- 1996 Alfred Stingl, Alexander Wagendristel, Gunter Waldek
- 1997 Kurt Estermann, Wolfgang Sauseng
- 1998 Thomas Herwig Schuler, Wolfram Wagner
- 1999 Burkhard Stangl
- 2000 Erdem Tunakan, Patrick Pulsinger
- 2001 Johannes Maria Staud
- 2002 Gernot Schedelberger
- 2003 Bernd Richard Deutsch, Thomas Daniel Schlee
- 2004 Johannes Kretz, Helmut Schmidinger
- 2005 Clementine Gasser
- 2006 Markus Bless
- 2007 Oguz Usman
- 2008 Šimon Voseček
- 2009 Roland Freisitzer
- 2010 Thomas Wally
- 2011 David Helbock
- 2012 Susanne Kirchmayr
- 2013 Alexandra Karastoyanova-Hermentin
- 2014 Bernhard Lang
- 2015 Pia Palme, Pier Damiano Peretti
- 2016 Utku Asuroglu
- 2017 Zahra Mani, Reinhold Schmölzer
- 2018 Andrea Sodomka
- 2019 PHACE – Ensemble for new music
- 2020 Klaus Lang
- 2021 Bernhard Gander
- 2022 Judit Varga
- 2023 Lukas König
