= Bijan Khadem-Missagh =

Austrian violinist, composer and conductor

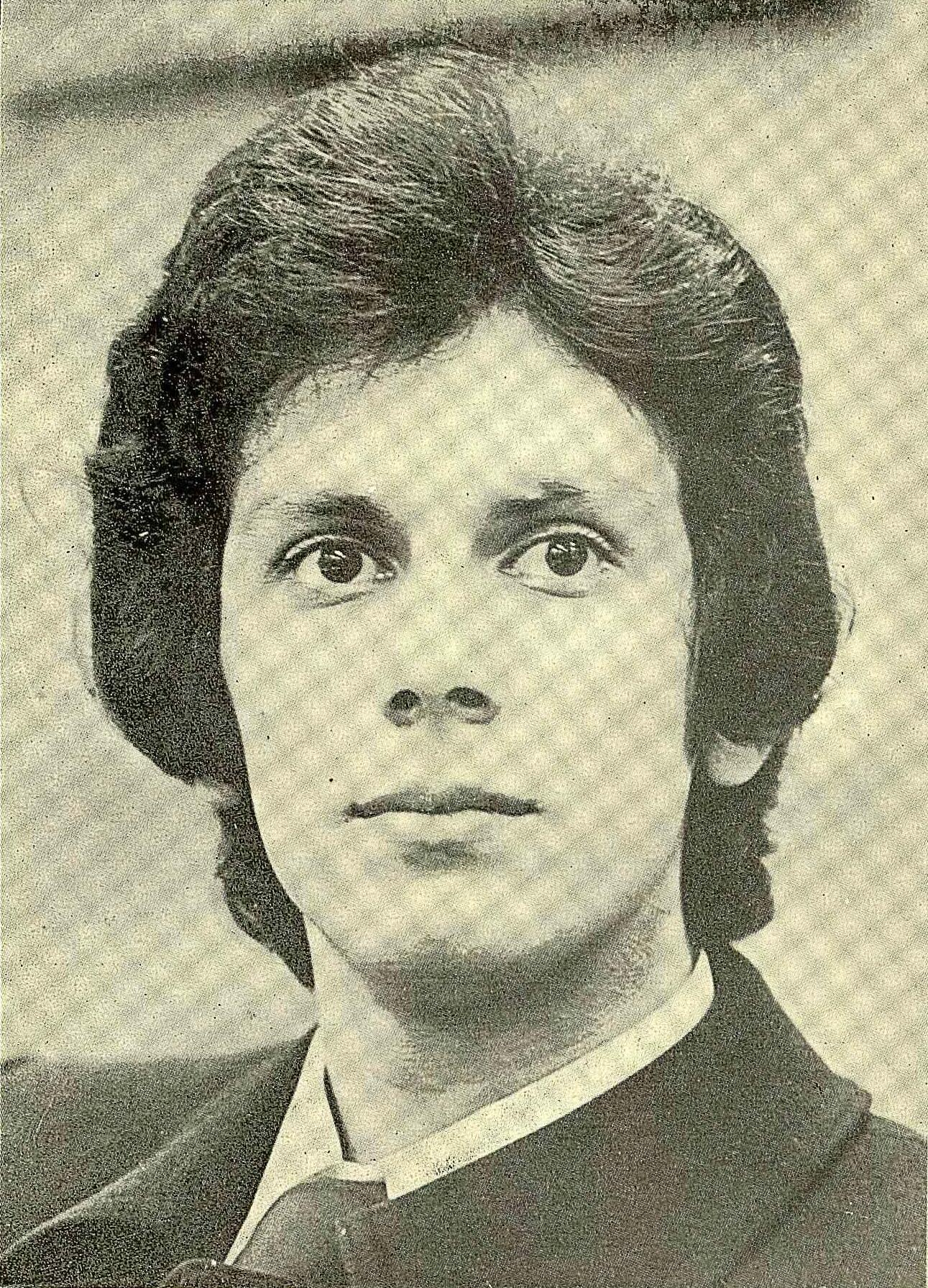
- Missagh in 1974
- Born: 26 October 1948 (age 77); Tehran, Iran
- Education: University of Music and Performing Arts in Vienna
- Occupations: violinist, composer and conductor
- Years active: 1971–2019
- Spouse: Shirin née Nooreyezdan (m. 1975; died 2016)
- Children: son Vahid
- Father: Ata Khadem-Missagh

Bijan Khadem-Missagh (بیژن خادم میثاق; born 26 October 1948) is an Austrian violinist, composer and conductor of Iranian descent. He is the founder and was the artistic director of the International Chamber Music Festival until 2016.

== Life and work ==
=== Origin and education ===
Khadem-Missagh was born into a family of musicians in Tehran and grew up in Vienna from 1958. He studied first with his father Ata Khadem-Missagh (concertmaster of the Tehran Symphony Orchestra) and then at the University of Music and Performing Arts in Vienna with professors Ernst Morawec, Edith Steinbauer, Franz Samohyl, Erwin Ratz, Heinrich Gattermeyer and Hans Swarovsky, graduating with distinction.

=== Concerts and Festivals ===
Khadem-Missagh celebrated an early debut as a violin soloist, which was followed by numerous international concert tours. In 1971, he became first concertmaster of the Niederösterreichisches Tonkünstlerorchester. In the same year he won the Grand Prix at the International Chamber Music Competition in Colmar, France. Also in 1971 he founded the Eurasia Quartet and in 1977 the Tonkünstler Chamber Orchestra, later called Academia Allegro Vivo. In 1979, he founded Allegro Vivo, the international chamber music festival in Horn, where the summer academy also takes place, where young musicians can attend master classes. Allegro Vivo also sees itself as a place of encounter and a fixed component of public life in the region. From 1980 to 1990, the musician was artistic director of the Midsummer Music Festival in Umeå, Sweden. In 1981, he founded the Badener Beethoventage in Baden near Vienna, of which he was artistic director until 1998. In 1997, he founded Globart - Connecting Worlds of Arts and Sciences in Krems, it is a foundation whose annual academy wants to be understood as a "meeting point for impulse generators and thought leaders from all over the world" Khadem-Missagh is listed as honorary president. From 1991 to 2000, he was artistic director of the Musik Forum Landegg in Switzerland.

Khadem-Missagh directed Allegro Vivo until 2016, before his son Vahid took over.

=== Compositional work ===
Khadem-Missagh's compositional work is characterised by his relationship to the concert music world. Formative for his works are the years of collaboration with the singing group "Dawn-Breakers", which he founded in Vienna in 1970 and led until 1992. Priority is given to the human voice. His aim is to achieve a harmony between words and music, and he is concerned with the choice of texts, which are above all spiritual in character. Khadem-Missagh remains in tonality, acknowledging the traditions of existing cultures without, however, denying the renewals of the 20th century. Boundaries between E and U music are deliberately crossed.

=== Publications ===
- Das Musische als Lebensweise is the title of the book by Bijan Khadem-Missagh, published by Horizonte Verlag in 1998; with an afterword by Frederick Mayer (member of the Club of Rome). It was published in Slovak in 2003.
- 1988: the book "Allegro Vivo" - 10 Years International Chamber Music Festival Austria was published.
- 1993: the book "Das Waldviertel als Musikviertel" was published for the 15th anniversary of the Festival.
- 2003: "Fortissimo für die Kammermusik" was published by Bibliothek der Provinz.
- 2009: "In Bewegung" Allegro Vivo

=== Teaching activities ===
From 1988 to 2010, Khadem-Missagh was professor at the Joseph Matthias Hauer Conservatory in Wiener Neustadt.

His master classes for violin have been held at the summer academy of the festival Allegro Vivo since 1979.

=== Family ===
In 1975, he married Shirin, née Nooreyezdan, who taught ethics and character education for children in Baden since 1980. She died in 2016. The marriage produced three children, who are also professional musicians: Son Vahid is a violinist, daughter Martha a violinist and Dorothy is a pianist.

== Dedications ==
Composers from various countries, including Karl Heinz Füssl, Lasse Thoresen, Alexander Vujic, Kurt Rapf, Karl Etti, Andreas Baksa, Alexander Rahbari, Heinrich Gattermeyer, Ulf-Diether Soyka, Robert Stiegler, Leo Schmetterer, Franz Thürauer and Herbert Zagler, dedicated works to Khadem-Missagh.

== Composers of commissioned works and world premieres within the framework of Allegro Vivo ==
- 1977 Alexander (Ali) Rahbari
- 1988 Kurt Rapf, Andreas Baksa
- 1992 Karl Heinz Füssl
- 1993 Weijie Gao
- 1994 Gottfried von Einem
- 1996 Robert Stiegler, Peter Hrncirik, Michael Neunteufel, Ulf-Dieter Soyka
- 1997 Andreas Etlinger, Michael Salomon, Leopold Schmetterer, Silvia Sommer, Gwendolyn Watson
- 1998 Heinrich Gattermeyer, Ladislav Lesko / Oto Vrhovnik
- 1999 Kurt Rapf, Reza Najfar
- 2000 Peter Hrncirik, Michael Salomon
- 2001 Wolfgang Mayer, Leopold Schmetterer
- 2002 Werner Schulze
- 2003 Ulrich Küchl, Robert Stiegler, Tolib Shakhidi
- 2005 Emanuel Schulz, Peter Hrncirik
- 2006 Markus Pfandler, Kornel Thomas
- 2007 Astrid Spitznagel, Silvia Sommer, Perikles Liakakis, Helmut Scherner
- 2014 Flora Marlene Geißelbrecht

== Awards and honours ==
- 1987: Kulturförderungspreis der Stadt Baden
- 1991: The "Mozart – Sinfonia Concertante, Divertimenti" CD was awarded the prize for the best production in the Mozart Year by the trade journal "Manual".
- 1991: Ehrendiplom des Opernhauses Duschanbe, Tadjikistan
- 1993: Silbernes Ehrenzeichen für Verdienste um das Bundesland Niederösterreich
- 1994: Kulturpreis der Stadt Baden
- 1998: Österreichisches Ehrenkreuz für Wissenschaft und Kunst
- 1999: Goldene Ehrennadel der Gemeinde Altenburg
- 2001: Albert Schweitzer Ehrenmedaille für Wissenschaft und Kunst
- 2003: Ehrenplakette der Stadt Horn
- 2004: Berufstitel Professor
- 2008: Goldenes Ehrenzeichen für Verdienste um das Bundesland Niederösterreich
- 2014: Großes Goldenes Ehrenzeichen für Verdienste um das Bundesland Niederösterreich
- 2014: NÖN Leopold, Kategorie Kultur als Künstler des Jahres
- 2019: Würdigungsmedaille in Gold der Universität für Musik und darstellende Kunst Wien für besondere Verdienste um die von der mdw vertretenen Künste
- 2019: Gläserner Leopold des Bundeslandes Niederösterreich

The musician is highly appreciated for his artistic work as well as for his social and humanitarian commitment across countries.
