= The Fire Raisers (play) =

1953 play by Max Frisch

The Arsonists (the Firebugs, the Fire Raisers)
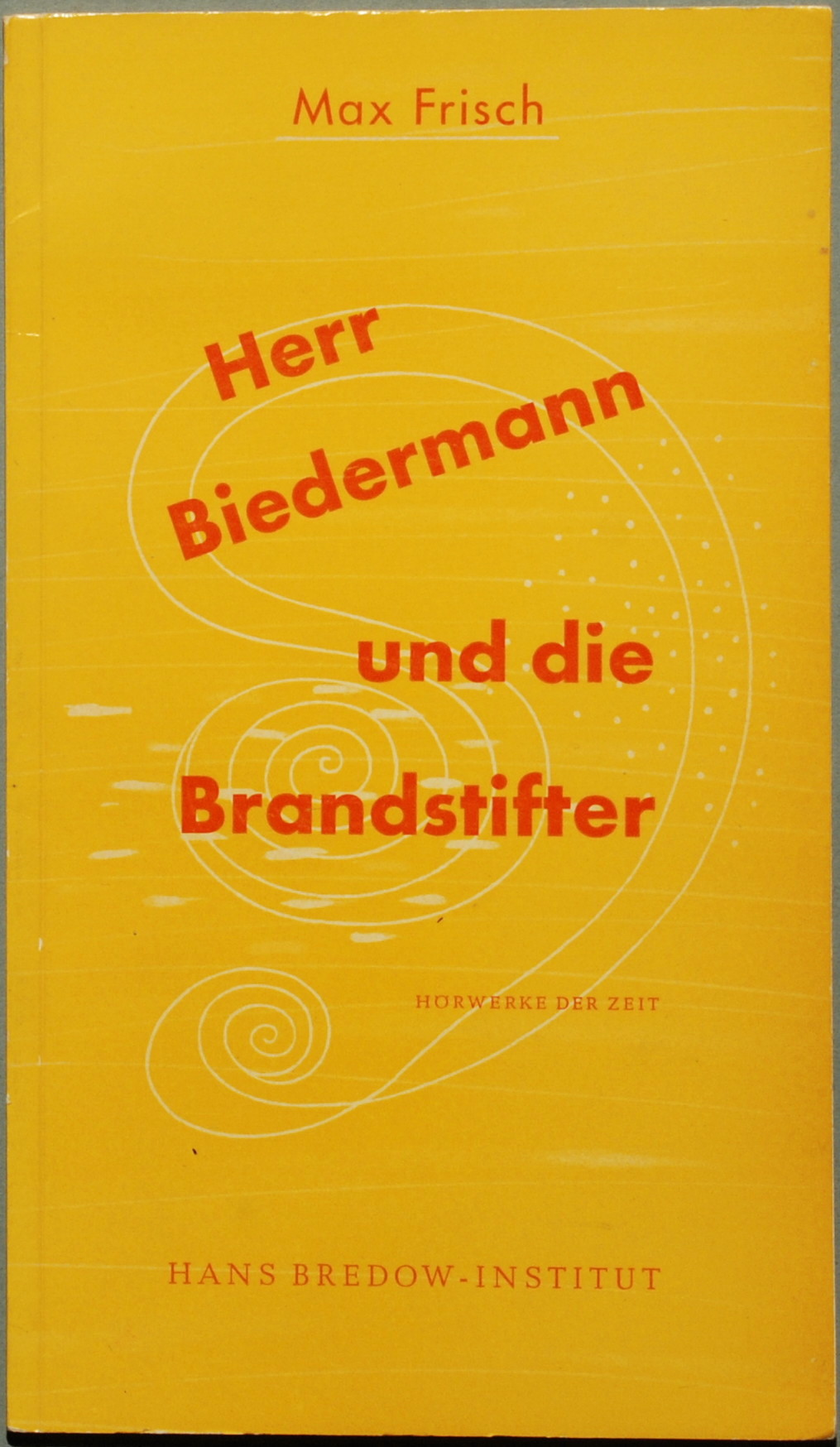
- First publication (Hans-Bredow-Institut, 1953)
- Original language: German
- Written by: Max Frisch
- Genre: Epic parable comedy

Premiere
- Date: 1958

The Arsonists (German: Biedermann und die Brandstifter), previously also known in English as The Firebugs or The Fire Raisers, was written by the Swiss novelist and playwright Max Frisch in 1953, first as a radio play, then adapted for television and the stage (1958) as a play in six scenes. It was revised in 1960 to include an epilogue.

== Plot ==
This dark comedy is set in a town that is regularly attacked by arsonists. Disguised as door-to-door salesmen (hawkers), they talk their way into people's homes and settle down in the attic, where they set about planning the destruction of the house.

The central character, a businessman called Biedermann, is seen at the outset reading newspaper reports of arson, convinced that he could never be taken in. Within minutes, the first "hawker" has appeared (Schmitz), and through a combination of intimidation and persuasion he talks his way into spending the night in the attic. As the play unfolds, a second arsonist appears (Eisenring), and before Biedermann can do anything to stop it, his attic is piled high with oil drums full of petrol. He even helps them to measure the detonating fuse and gives them matches, refusing to believe the full horror of what is happening. He soon becomes an accomplice in his own downfall.

The action is observed by a Greek-style chorus of "firemen", and the increasingly surreal flavour culminates in a final scene, the afterpiece, where Biedermann and his wife Babette find themselves at the gates of Hell. Here they once again meet Schmitz and Eisenring who turn out to be Beelzebub and the Devil respectively, who, after becoming angered at the number of mass murderers being allowed to go to Heaven, refuse to conduct a Hell for a "small fry" like Biedermann.

== Analysis ==
The first sketch was written in 1948 in response to the Communist takeover in Prague, but the play is often seen as a metaphor for Nazism and fascism, and Frisch encourages this through several allusions. The play shows how "normal" citizens can be taken in by evil. As a parable, in a more general sense it may be considered to be descriptive of the gullible and easily manipulated aspects of the German Biedermann – the Everyman – who yearns both for a sense of shallow propriety and for a deeper sense of belonging, even if it comes at a great price, including that which is sensible or even necessary for his own survival. In that sense, the play shares much with absurdist plays written at around the same time, such as Eugene Ionesco's Rhinoceros.

The name Biedermann is itself a play on the German word bieder meaning conventional, conservative, worthy, honest, upright and is frequently used in a pejorative or ironic context. Thus the name equates to der biedere Mann or the worthy man. Bieder is associated with Biedermeier, a cultural style of the 19th century prominent for its association with a type of petite bourgeoisie mindset.

== Production history ==
The Fire Raisers, translated by Michael Bullock, was produced in London on December 21, 1961, at the Royal Court Theatre with Alfred Marks as Biedermann. The same translation was also presented at Bristol Old Vic in 1962, with Paul Eddington in the role of Biedermann. The first British performance of the full play took place at the Citizens' Theatre, Glasgow in May 1962 with Jack Radcliffe in the role of Biedermann and Helen Norman as Babette. Jules Irving and Herbert Blau directed a San Francisco Actor's Workshop production of The Firebugs on February 28, 1964. Bullock's translation was also staged by the Edinburgh Gateway Company in the autumn of 1964. Also in 1964, the play was put on at Lawrence College (now Lawrence University). Mordecai Gorelik, research professor of theater at Southern Illinois University (SIU), wrote the authorized English translation and directed it to positive reviews in 1964 while a visiting professor at California State University, Los Angeles, and again June 1–5, 1965, at SIU. The inmates of San Quentin Prison staged The Firebugs in June 1965. The first United States performance that included the epilogue was directed by Edwin Duerr on May 16, 1968, at California State College, Fullerton.

During his brief tenure as Director of the Liverpool Playhouse, Bernard Hepton put on the play, which featured in his effort to move the theatre’s repertoire beyond its normal fare.

A new translation of the play by Alistair Beaton entitled The Arsonists, featuring Benedict Cumberbatch, was produced at London's Royal Court Theatre in November 2007, under the direction of Ramin Gray. It was also performed in 1968 at the Bristol Old Vic with Tim Pigott-Smith as one of the Fireraisers.

The play has been adapted into the opera Biedermann und die Brandstifter by Šimon Voseček (premiered in 2013 at the Neue Oper Wien in Vienna). The English version Biedermann and the Arsonists, translated by David Pountney, was performed at the Independent Opera at Sadler's Wells in November 2015. (director: Max Hoehn, conductor: Tim Redmond).

In September 2017, Washington's Woolly Mammoth Theatre Company produced an updated staging of the play, almost immediately after the election of Donald Trump. The script was from the translation by Alistair Beaton and directed by Michael Garcés. The theater cast their artistic director Howard Shalwitzof as the lead actor.
