= European Bridges Ensemble =

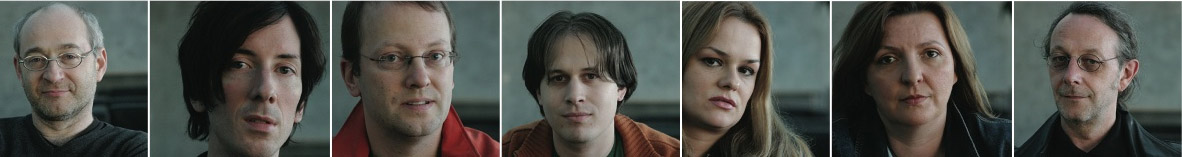

Background information
- Also known as: EBE
- Origin: Europe
- Genre: electronic music
- Occupation: Electronic Ensemble
- Years active: 2005 – present
- Members: Stewart Collinson; Georg Hajdu; Johannes Kretz; Kai Niggemann; Ivana Ognjanović; Ádám Siska; Andrea Szigetvári
- Past members: Marlon Schumacher
- Website: www.e-b-e.eu

The European Bridges Ensemble (EBE) was established for Internet and network music performance. Its current members are the five performers Kai Niggemann (Münster, Germany), Ádám Siska (Budapest, Hungary), Johannes Kretz (Vienna, Austria), Andrea Szigetvári (Dunakeszi, Hungary), and Ivana Ognjanović (Belgrade, Serbia); the conductor and software designer Georg Hajdu (Hamburg, Germany); and video artist Stewart Collinson (Lincoln, England).

Using the term "bridges" as a metaphor, the Ensemble attempts to bridge cultures, regions, locations, and individuals, each with their specific history. Particularly, Europe with its historical and ethnic diversity, has repeatedly gone through massive changes, separating and reuniting people often living in close vicinity. The aim is to further explore the potential of taking participating musicians and artists out of their political and social isolation by creating virtual communities of like-minded artists united by their creativity and mutual interests.

The first Bridges concert on 17 June 2005 (simultaneously in Münster, Stuttgart and Vienna) brought together musicians from the former West (Austria and Germany) and East (Hungary and Serbia) connected by the river Danube – and thus demonstrated the potential of Internet performance as a means to overcome national borders and political single-mindedness.

== Network Music and Quintet.net ==
The term "network music" is often used to refer to musical activities that utilise computer network technologies in a performative context. Network music can be performed by laptop ensembles, for example, PLOrk, SLOrk, The Hub, or PowerBooks_UnPlugged. The extent to which network technology is utilised in performance can vary. EBE's implementation of network music involves the use of software called Quintet.net, which was developed by the ensemble's co-founder, Georg Hajdu, using Max/MSP/Jitter.

The basic concept of Quintet.net is that there is a conductor and several (up to five) performers (or clients), connected to each other using a central server. The clients get instructions from the conductor. These instructions can be messages sent to the clients, but usually it is a score part to play. On the other hand, control data created by the clients are sent back to the network. This latter, combined with the fact that an unlimited number of clients can connect to the server in a so-called listener mode (that is, a mode where the client only receives data but does not send control data back), lets anyone connect to the server and listen to the music being played in real time.

Since the network is only used to send control data (using Open Sound Control) and the music itself is always created locally, the normal household bandwidths are generally sufficient to transmit all the data needed for the platform. This means that the performers do not need to be physically present at the performance's place, but can play from anywhere in the world (this is a big difference compared to the usual concept of musical performance, and at the time when the Ensemble was founded, the EBE was the only group playing music in a wide area network). As an example, during the first concert of the Ensemble the performers were located at four different cities of Europe (Budapest, Münster, Stuttgart and Vienna), and the concert itself was broadcast at three different concert halls (and the Internet) in Münster, Stuttgart and Vienna at the same time.

After video artist Stewart Collinson joined the EBE, the original Quintet.net concept was expanded with a new tool called Viewer, which is an extension that makes Quintet.net able to manage video mixing as well.

== Repertoire ==
The ensemble plays pieces mostly written by the members of the group itself, but music by outside composers is played occasionally as well.

Repertoire of EBE
Title	Composer	First Performance
Bridges (2005)	K. Niggemann, M. Schumacher, J. Kretz, A. Szigetvári, I. Ognjanović	17 June 2005, Münster, Stuttgart, Vienna
Quintessence (2007)	K. Niggemann, M. Schumacher, J. Kretz, A. Szigetvári, I. Ognjanović	6 September 2007, Budapest
Ivresse '84 (2007)	Georg Hajdu	6 September 2007, Budapest
Keep Calm and Carry On (2007)	Kai Niggemann (music & text), Maria Popara (text)	6 September 2007, Budapest
Brokenheart (2007)	Anne La Berge	6 September 2007, Budapest
Netze spinnen # Spinnennetze (2007)	Sascha Lino Lemke	13 October 2007, Berlin
Radio Music (1956/2008)	John Cage, Georg Hajdu	26 November 2008, Hamburg
185 (2008)	Ádám Siska	26 November 2008, Hamburg
Pundit Bingo (2009)	Daniel Iglesia	23 November 2009, Hamburg
f0choir (2009)	Fredrik Olofsson	23 November 2009, Hamburg
isms (2009)	Jacob Sello	23 November 2009, Hamburg
A few plateaus (2009)	Alexander Schubert	23 November 2009, Hamburg
Two Arias (May I Feel and Kiss Me) and Encore (2009)	Johannes Kretz	23 November 2009, Hamburg
D(é)RIVE (2010)	K. Niggemann, Á. Siska, J. Kretz, A. Szigetvári, I. Ognjanović	10 December 2010, Pécs

The first music written for EBE was Bridges, a work of five movements composed by Kai Niggemann, Marlon Schumacher, Johannes Kretz, Andrea Szigetvári and Ivana Ognjanović in 2005. Each movement was composed by a different musician, and every movement reflects somehow on the city where the actual musician lives (in other words, there is a movement about Münster, Stuttgart, Vienna, Budapest and Belgrade). It was first performed on the Internet with a live broadcast in Münster, Stuttgart and Vienna on 17 June 2005.

A similar piece is Quintessence, also with five movements, each one about one of the five elements. The composers are Kai Niggemann (Earth), Marlon Schumacher (Fire), Johannes Kretz (Quintessence), Andrea Szigetvári (Air) and Ivana Ognjanović (Water). It was composed in 2007 and first played during the Music in the Global Village conference on 6 September 2007.

Ivresse '84 (composed by Ensemble leader Georg Hajdu in 2007) is the first piece for the group where only four laptop players are needed, as the fifth player is replaced by a violinist. The piece reflects on the riot that happened during the premiere of the first two books of John Cage's Freeman Etudes in Ivrea (Turin), in 1984. It was first performed during the Music in the Global Village conference on 6 September 2007 by János Négyesy, the same violinist who played the Etudes on the original premiere.

The first piece also having text spoken was Keep Calm and Carry On. The text is a dialogue written by Maria Popara and Kai Niggemann using the typical slang of chat. The music was composed by Kai Niggemann in 2007, and the piece was also first performed during the Music in the Global Village conference on 6 September 2007.

Anne La Berge, a composer and flutist, composed Brokenheart for LOOS Ensemble and EBE in 2007, where the goal was to write a piece where the laptop ensemble plays together with an acoustic ensemble (including flute, piano, and percussion). It was first played during the Music in the Global Village conference on 6 September 2007.

In 2007 the Ensemble was invited to play at a concert of Projekt Bipolar in Berlin on 13 October 2007. There was a young composers' competition, "Hommage à György Ligeti" among the activities of Projekt Bipolar, and the prizes were given to the winners also during this concert. For this event, EBE commissioned a piece from Sascha Lino Lemke. Netze spinnen # Spinnennetze is a work where the five players are split in space. The material used by Lemke relates in several ways to Ligeti's music, including the use of metronomes and other polyrhythmical solutions.

Ensemble member Ádám Siska wrote his piece 185 in 2008 (first performed during the Hamburger Klangwerktage 2008 Festival on 26 November 2008). This was the first piece in the repertoire not using sampling techniques at all.

The Ensemble also created transcriptions of two pieces by John Cage. One was Five (composed in 1988, EBE version first performed on 27 April 2006); the other was Radio Music (composed in 1956, transcribed by Georg Hajdu in 2008, EBE version first performed on 26 November 2008).

In 2010 EBE was invited to perform a concert in collaboration with Marek Chołoniewski as part of the European Capital of Culture program taking place in Pécs, Hungary, that year.

== Concerts ==
The founding event of EBE was the Lange Musik Nacht on 17 June 2005. Conductor Georg Hajdu and performers Ivana Ognjanović and Marlon Schumacher were in Stuttgart, Kai Niggemann in Münster, Johannes Kretz in Wien and Andrea Szigetvári in Budapest. The piece played was Bridges, and it demonstrated that the idea of playing music via a wide area network is possible. This same piece was performed again in a concert a year later, where the whole Ensemble played in a local area network at the Making New Waves 2006 festival in Budapest, Hungary.

This concert was followed by a long pause: the next time the band appeared again on stage was only in early Autumn 2007 at the Music in the Global Village Conference Budapest (this was the first international conference dedicated exclusively to network music composition and performance). Here, the opening concert was played by the EBE, together with Anne La Berge and the LOOS Ensemble. The conference itself was part of Projekt-Bipolar, a two-year-long German-Hungarian cultural programme. The Ensemble had two more concerts organized by members of Projekt-Bipolar during October 2007 in Berlin, Germany. These included the closing concert of Projekt Bipolar and also the closing event of a young composers' competition.

During 2008 the band played on five concerts at three festivals: two subsequent nights during the ICMC 2008 at the Whitla Hall in Belfast., two concerts at the Klangwerktage 2008 festival in Hamburg (from which one was a wide area network concert with ensemble member Johannes Kretz playing from Krems, Austria) and one at Making New Waves 2008 festival in Budapest, Hungary. After this last concert, the Hungarian Television made an interview presenting the Ensemble.

In 2009 the Ensemble had concerts in Prague at the Enter^{4} festival, the Klangwerktage 2009 festival in Hamburg, the Making New Waves 2009 festival with its second edition of the Music in the Global Village conference; and a wide area network concert at the SIGGRAPH Asia conference with ensemble members playing from Yokohama, Lincoln, Budapest and Belgrade.
