= René Staar =

Austrian composer, violinist and conductor

René Staar (born 30 May 1951) is an Austrian composer, violinist and conductor.

== Life ==
Born in Graz, Staar composed his first pieces as a child. He attended the Östermalms Musikskole Stockholm in 1962-1963 and studied music theory with Walter Wasservogel. This was followed by violin studies with Franz Samohyl and, from 1965, studies in harmony and counterpoint at the University of Music and Performing Arts Vienna.

In 1968, Staar completed guest studies at the Sibelius Academy with Anja Ignatius (violin) and Izumi Tateno (piano). In Helsinki he also made his debut as a violinist and pianist. In Vienna he continued his training with Alfred Uhl (composition), Erich Urbanner (twelve-tone music) and Francesco Valdambrini (Neue Musik) and began conducting studies with Hans Swarowsky and Karl Österreicher in 1972. From 1977, he took master classes with Nathan Milstein in Zurich and completed postgraduate studies with Roman Haubenstock-Ramati in 1981, receiving further impulses from Leonard Bernstein.

From 1974, Staar was assistant to his teacher Franz Samohyl. In 1979, he founded the Trio des Trois Mondes, which existed until 1981. As a violinist he performed with the Vienna Symphony Orchestra, undertook concert tours to Switzerland, the Netherlands and the United States and played the world premiere of Robert Schollum's Violin Concerto with the ORF Symphony Orchestra.

Since the early 1980s, Staar has worked as a soloist with the Ensemble 20. Jahrhundert, with whom he performed his composition Fragmente eines Traumspiels during a concert tour through Sweden in 1986. In the same year, he was awarded a prize for his composition Just an Accident? A Requiem for Anton Webern and Other Victims of the Absurd, he was awarded the Ernst Krenek Prize of the City of Vienna. Since 1987, he was a member of the Wiener Streichersolisten, from 1990 to 1994 as its managing director.

In 1987, he founded the "Ensemble Wiener Collage" with Eugene Hartzell and Erik Freitag, which is dedicated to the interpretation of contemporary works, especially by Austrian composers. In 1988, he became a member of the orchestra of the Vienna State Opera. With the Ensemble Wiener Collage he performed compositions by Mozart and contemporary composers in Japan and the United States in 1991.

In 1994, Staar became a visiting professor at the University of Music and Performing Arts Graz. In 1996, he performed for the first time with the newly formed piano quintet Vienna-Paris with pianist Roger Muraro. In 1999, the collaborative stage work Da Capo al Capone by Dieter Kaufmann and Ulrich Kaufmann, Erik Freitag, Georg Amanshauser, Amy Leverenz, Eugene Hartzell and Staar was premiered. For the first time in its more than 170-year history, the Vienna Philharmonic commissioned a composition from one of its members: on 17 May 2014, Staar's orchestral work Time Recycling was premiered under the direction of Semyon Bychkov in the Golden Hall of the Vienna Musikverein; on 23 and 24 August 2014, the work was presented at the Salzburg Festival under the direction of Gustavo Dudamel, both times quite successfully.

In 2014, he was awarded the Great Decoration of Merit of the Province of Salzburg.

== Work ==
- Das Bühnenwerk: Fortunes of war Op.37 (Vienna, 1999) (libretto by Amy Leverenz)
- Movimientos para Don José Haydn for chamber orchestra Op.8, 1981–1983, 1990 (also for two pianos)
- Structures I–VI for chamber orchestra Op.7, 1980–1982, revision 1994/2001
- Just an Accident? (A Requiem for Anton Webern and Other Victims of the Absurd) Op.9 (text by Alan Levy) for soprano, narrator and large orchestra, 1985
- Zwei Lieder nach Worten von Else Lasker-Schüler for soprano and chamber ensemble Op., 20 I, 1987–1995
- Bagatellen auf den Namen György Ligeti for piano Op. 14 Nr. 3a, 1989–1996
- Metamorphosen eines Labyrinths for ten solo strings and solo violin Op. 22a, 1990–1995
- Gemini, Duette-Zyklus Op. 24, 1991–2000
- La Fontaine du Sang for solo violin and large orchestra Op.22b, 1992–2001
- Versunkene Träume, six sketches for String Quartet Op.22c, 1993
- Europafanfaren for wind orchestra Op.28, 1994
- Cat Music for flute, clarinet, saxophone, trumpet, trombone, tuba, accordion, piano and cello Op.38, 1999–2000
- Hammabbul for soloists, mixed choir and orchestra Op.22g (Munich, 2003, full-length new version Vienna 2008) (text: Bible, synthetic language and sound elements compiled by the composer and Anna-Maria Adaktylos)
- P.B. forever for chamber ensemble (2009) Op.14 Nr. 10
- Morgengabe for cello and piano Op.14 Nr. 9, 2002
- Klischee for large Orchestra Op.22e 1995–2002
- Kodai-no-ibuk for violin, shakuhachi, traditional gagaku instruments and shōmyō male choir Op.30 (1996)
