= Biedermann und die Brandstifter (opera) =

Opera by Šimon Voseček

Biedermann und die Brandstifter is a German-language opera in 2 acts by Šimon Voseček for 8 voices and orchestra to the composer's own libretto after Biedermann und die Brandstifter by Max Frisch. The opera was written 2005–2007 and premiered 2013 at the Neue Oper Wien in Vienna under director: Béatrice Lachaussée, and conductor Walter Kobéra as well as at Bozen in the German-speaking area of Northern Italy.

The English premiere of Biedermann and the Arsonists translated by David Pountney was performed 2015 at Independent Opera at Sadler's Wells.

== Recording ==
- Biedermann und die Brandstifter ORF
