= Thürauer =

Thürauer is a surname. Notable people with the surname include:

- Franz Thürauer (born 1953), Austrian composer and music educator
- Lukas Thürauer (born 1987), Austrian footballer
