= Amy Leverenz =

American dramatic soprano

Amy Leverenz (born 1951 in Riverside, California) is an American dramatic soprano living in Germany.

== Life ==
After studying medicine in the US, Leverenz studied singing with Karl Tuttner at the University of Music and Performing Arts Vienna from 1972. Her repertoire focuses on contemporary music, jazz and rock. From 1973 to 1978, she was a member of the Ensemble Contraste for contemporary music, and from 1976 to 1978 she was a guest soloist with the Arnold Schoenberg Choir. After and alongside concert tours in the early 1980s with musicians and bands such as Udo Jürgens, Eloy, Drahdiwaberl, Hansi Lang and Milva, Leverenz increasingly turned to her own projects.

With the pianist Olaf Joksch she gave cabaret evenings in Frankfurt and Offenbach in the 1980s (among others (K)ein Liederabend - Liederbissen von Bach bis Zappa at the Theater am Turm 1985-1986 and 500 Jahre Filmmusik at the Alte Oper 1986–1988). In 1980-1981 she gave 120 performances of Sie singen unser Lied at the Theater am Kurfürstendamm, in 1981 she appeared 50 times in Großstadtkinder at the Berliner Kammerspiele and with the touring company of the Kleine Oper Bad Homburg she performed the children's opera revue Max und Moritz more than one hundred times in the role of Max.

As her own projects, she realised among others Staffellauf im Wespennest (1987), a performance with singing and pantomime with Olaf Joksch, the operetta talk show Lieber reich aber glücklich (1995) with the actor Peter Bauer and the pianist Elisabeth Süsser and the multimedia Concerti Piccoli for the 100th birthday of Marie Luise Kaschnitz. (2001) with Peter Bauer and Heike Michaelis and compositions by Alberto Mompellio, Piero Milesi and Erik Freitag.

Leverenz has performed in several programmes with jazz guitarist Markus Fleischer, such as Dreamers and Jokers - Jazz Standards from Musical and Film (2005-2007), Brecht: Happy End? (2006) and Stilwechsel - Kammerrock (since 2009). For the composer René Staar, she wrote the libretti for Fortunes Of War (1997, about Al Capone) and The Gypsy Boy (1998, about Federico García Lorca).

Since 1986, Leverenz has been giving singing lessons. From 1994 to 2002, she taught at the Scream Factory in Frankfurt, which she co-founded, and since 2002 she has been a lecturer in singing at the Frankfurt University of Music and Performing Arts. Private singing lessons with her took among others Xavier Naidoo, Sabrina Setlur, Sebastian Hämer, Christine Kaufmann, Bela B., Nadja Benaissa, Kevin Russell, Stefan Weidner, Lisa Da Costa and Beukes Willemsen.
