= Hymer (surname) =

Hymer or Hymers is a surname, and may refer to:

- Jennifer Hymer (born 1960s), American pianist living in Hamburg, Germany
- John Hymers (1803–1887), English mathematician and cleric
- R. L. Hymers, Jr. (born 1941), American Baptist pastor and author
- Stephen Hymer (1934–1974), Canadian economist
- Warren Hymer (1906–1948), American film actor

== See also ==
- Hymer, German motorhome manufacturer
