= Marie-Thérèse Kerschbaumer =

Austrian writer

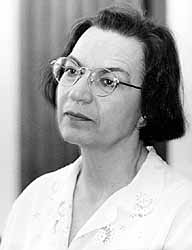
Marie-Thérèse Kerschbaumer photographed in 1988

Marie-Thérèse Kerschbaumer (born 31 August 1936) is an Austrian novelist and poet, one of the leading women prose writers in German. Her mainly fictional works present the horrors of Fascism, especially the repression of minorities.

== Early life and education ==
Kerschbaumer was born in Garches near Paris where her Cuban father and Austrian mother were living to escape the Spanish Civil War. After spending her childhood years mainly in Costa Rica and the Austrian Tyrol, she worked in England for a year when she was 17 and then went on to Italy. In 1957, she returned to Austria to further her education. From 1963 she studied Romance languages at Vienna University and spent two years in Romania before earning a doctorate in Romanian linguistics in 1973. In 1971 she married the painter Helmut Kurz-Goldenstein.

== Career ==
After completing her studies, Kerschbaumer worked as a translator, mainly from Spanish. Her first novel, Der Schwimmer (The Swimmer) was published in 1976, describing how inmates tried to escape from an institution in the Spanish State. In 1980 she published Der weibliche Name des Widerstands (The Feminine Name of Resistance) consisting of seven fictional accounts of women in concentration camps during the world war. A combination of documentary literature and creative writing, the work appeared as a television film the following year (script with Susanne Zanke) and was published as a popular paperback edition in 1982. Her third work, Schwestern (Sisters, 1982) is a novel tracing the experiences of several generations of an Austrian family as the events of the 20th century affect their lives. Kerschbaumer has also written plays which have been well received on Austrian radio but have not been published.

From 1992 to 2000 Kerschbaumer wrote the three novels of the Die Fremde series, an autobiographical trilogy tracing the life of a girl born in the Austrian alps, who goes to France and England before studying Italian language and art in Tuscany. Her most recent work, Wasser und Wind (Water and Wind, 2006), is a collection of poems written between 1988 and 2005.

A number of Kerschbaumer's texts have been set to music by, among others, Olga Neuwirth, Ulf Dieter Soyka.

== See also ==
- List of Austrian writers
