= Clarence Barlow =

British composer (1945–2023)

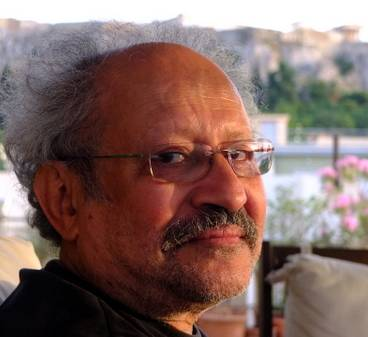
- Barlow in 2013
- Born: 27 December 1945; Calcutta, Bengal Province, British India
- Died: 29 June 2023 (aged 77); Barcelona, Spain
- Other names: Klarenz Barlow (Note: Other pseudonyms include: Clarentiu Barlescu, Clarêncio Barlão, Clarent Barleau, Klarentios Barlopoulos, Chiarenzo Barlo, Klarens Barlå, Klárus Albertsson Bárður, Clarentius Barlovicus, Clarlo, Bárlo Klárens, Klarendranáth Bárloji and Klárendranáth Bárlopádhyay.)
- Occupation: Composer

Clarence Albertson Barlow (also Klarenz; 27 December 1945 – 29 June 2023) was a British composer of classical and electroacoustic works. He was an academic teacher internationally, at the Royal Conservatory of The Hague from 1990 and at the University of California, Santa Barbara, from 2006, among others. He taught at the Darmstädter Ferienkurse from 1982 to 1994.

== Life ==
=== Early life and education ===
Barlow was born on 27 December 1945 in Calcutta, British India. Of English, Portuguese, and French colonial descent, he wrote his first compositions in 1957. He studied piano, music theory and natural sciences. In 1965 he received a science degree from Calcutta University, as well as a Licentiate Diploma in piano from Trinity College of Music in London. From 1966 to 1968 he taught music theory and worked as a conductor at the Calcutta School of Music.

In 1968 Barlow relocated to Cologne, where he studied electronic music and composition at the Hochschule für Musik Köln with Herbert Eimert, Vinko Globokar, Bernd Alois Zimmermann (1968 to 1970) and Karlheinz Stockhausen (1971 to 1973). From 1971 to 1972 he also studied at the Institute of Sonology of Utrecht University, where he began to use computers as an aid for compositions.

=== Career ===
Barlow was one of the founders of Initiative Musik und Informatik Köln in 1986. He taught at the Darmstädter Ferienkurse from 1982 to 1994. In 1988 he was the director of music at the International Computer Music Conference in Cologne. From 1990 to 1994, Barlow was the artistic director of the Institute of Sonology, at the Royal Conservatory of The Hague, where he also taught in the composition department, continuing until 2006. He was a visiting professor of composition at the Folkwang Hochschule Essen in 1990 and 1991. He was a member of the Académie Internationale de Musique Electroacoustique in Bourges from 1994 to 2010, and visiting professor of composition at the School of Music and Performing Arts ESMAE in Porto in 2005 and 2006.

Barlow was the Corwin Endowed Chair and head of composition at University of California, Santa Barbara's Music Department from 2006 to 2019. He was visiting professor at the Catalonia College of Music in Barcelona from 2018 to 2020. Among his students were Dennis Báthory-Kitsz, Marko Ciciliani, Georg Hajdu, Rozalie Hirs, Gabriel Pareyon and Kristoffer Zegers.

=== Personal life ===
Barlow was married to the artist Birgit Faustmann. He was severely injured in a fall in April 2023. He died in Barcelona on 29 June 2023 aged 77.

== Compositions ==
Barlow became known as a pioneer of electronic and computer music, with advancements in interdisciplinary works including mathematics and computer science, visual arts and literature. His music incorporated tradition and elements inherited from the past. His works were mostly written for traditional instruments, including elements also from other cultures. Barlow preferred traditional timbres to synthesized ones because "they sound so much more alive and exciting". He frequently used computers to generate the structures of his works. His comprehensive theory of tonality and metrics was first tested in the piano work Çoǧluotobüsişletmesi (1975–79). Spectral analysis and instrumental resynthesis of human speech also played an important role in his compositions.

Between 1959 and 2020 Barlow composed more than 100 works, including orchestral works such as two piano concertos, 40 pieces of chamber music including two string quartets, works for music theater, choral and vocal compositions, 30 piano pieces, five film scores and 20 electroacoustic works.
