= Alan Levy =

American author (1932–2004)

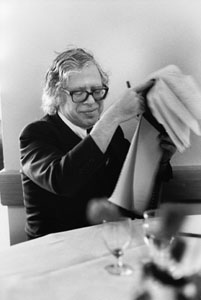
Levy in 1981

Alan Levy (February 10, 1932 – April 2, 2004) was an American author.

== Early life and education ==
Levy was born in New York City in 1932 and educated at Brown and Columbia universities. In 1952, at Brown University, he co-authored an original Brownbrokers musical titled Anything Can Be Fixed with Gill Bach and Porter Woods.

== Career ==
Levy worked seven years as a reporter for the Louisville Courier-Journal in Louisville, Kentucky, and later spent seven years in New York City as a journalist, writing for Life magazine, The Saturday Evening Post, The New York Times and others. Among first personalities he interviewed were W. H. Auden, the Beatles, Fidel Castro, Graham Greene, Václav Havel, Sophia Loren, Vladimir Nabokov, Richard Nixon, and Ezra Pound.

In 1967, Levy moved to Prague with his family, to collaborate on an American version of a musical by Jiří Šlitr and Jiří Suchý.

Shortly after, he covered the Prague Spring and the Soviet-led Warsaw Pact invasion of Czechoslovakia in 1968 and chronicled the events in Rowboat to Prague, published in the United States in 1972. Josef and Zdena Skvoreckys' Toronto publishing house, 68 Publishers, translated the book into Czech in 1975, which has been smuggled to Czechoslovakia, where it became one of the underground classics. It was republished in 1980 as So Many Heroes and translated into numerous languages.

He and his family were expelled from the city in 1971. They settled in Vienna, Austria, where Levy wrote for the International Herald Tribune, Life, Good Housekeeping, The New York Times Magazine, Cosmopolitan and others. He was also dramaturge of Vienna's English Theatre and taught literature, writing, journalism and drama.

They returned to Prague in 1990, after the so-called "Velvet Revolution". From 1991 until his death in 2004, he was editor-in-chief of The Prague Post. Levy claims to have coined the phrase "Prague, the Left Bank of the '90s" in the Post's first issue. The article is said to have attracted thousands of young North Americans to Prague of the 1990s. Other sources, however, say that the phrase was already in common usage before Levy quoted it.

In 1993, he published The Wiesenthal File, the story of Nazi hunter Simon Wiesenthal. The book earned Levy the "Author of the Year" award from the American Society of Journalists and Authors. Levy also wrote a play, The World of Ruth Draper, and wrote the libretto for Just an Accident?, a symphonic requiem by Austrian composer René Staar, performed in November 1998 in Prague by the Czech National Symphony Orchestra at Dvořák Hall in the Rudolfinum.

== Personal life ==
With his wife Valerie, he had two daughters Erika and Monica, and four grandchildren, David, Maya, Melina, and Lisa.

== Remembering Alan Levy ==
Václav Havel, former president of the Czech Republic, said:

Alan Levy chose to become active in our country during what was for us a very sensitive and important period -- the time of creating a free, open environment for the media. Because of his human qualities and professional experience, he quickly became recognized as a not inconsiderable figure for whom I had great respect. What is more, I regret him leaving us at a point when a number of Czech media outlets are blurring the limits between serious and tabloid journalism.

== Quotes ==
- "I dreamed only of seeing Prague again before I died. Isolated in Austria by an Iron Curtain ... I nonetheless had a premonition that somehow I would die here. It never dawned on me until soon after 1989's Velvet Revolution that first I could live here."
- "The miracle of my life is to awaken every morning in the 21st century – in Prague."
- "We are living in the Left Bank of the '90s. For some of us, Prague is Second Chance City; for others a new frontier where anything goes, everything goes, and, often enough, nothing works. Yesterday is long gone, today is nebulous, and who knows about tomorrow, but, somewhere within each of us, we all know that we are living in a historic place at a historic time."
  –in The Prague Post, October 1, 1991 (first issue)
- "A rex-pat is a returning expatriate, an ex-pat has been here, goes home to America, takes a job, maybe goes to law school, maybe does well in America but can't get Prague out of his or her blood and returns to Prague to live again."
  –in the film Rex-patriates, 2004

== Bibliography ==
(a selection of the 18 books)

- The Wiesenthal File, Alan Levy, William Eerdmans Publishing, Michigan, 1993 ISBN 0-8028-3772-7
- Vladimir Nabokov: The Velvet Butterfly, Alan Levy, Permanent Press, Sag Harbor, NY, 1984 ISBN 0-932966-41-1 (pbk.)
- W.H. Auden: In the Autumn of the Age of Anxiety, Alan Levy, Sag Harbor, NY, 1983 ISBN 0-932966-31-4 (pbk.)
- Ezra Pound, the Voice of Silence, Alan Levy, Sag Harbor, NY, 1983 ISBN 0-932966-25-X (pbk.)
- Rowboat to Prague, Alan Levy, Grossman Publishers, NY, 1972 ISBN 0-670-60920-X
- Levy, Alan. Thomas Mainwaring (ed.). "The Right Myths at the Right Time: Myth Making and Hero Worship in Post-Frontier American Society--George Edward Waddell versus Christy Mathewson". Topic: The Washington & Jefferson College Review. 53 (A Festschrift for Professor Walter S. Sanderlin). ISSN 0049-4127. Archived from the original on 2014-04-21.
