= János Négyesy =

Hungarian violinist

Négyesy János
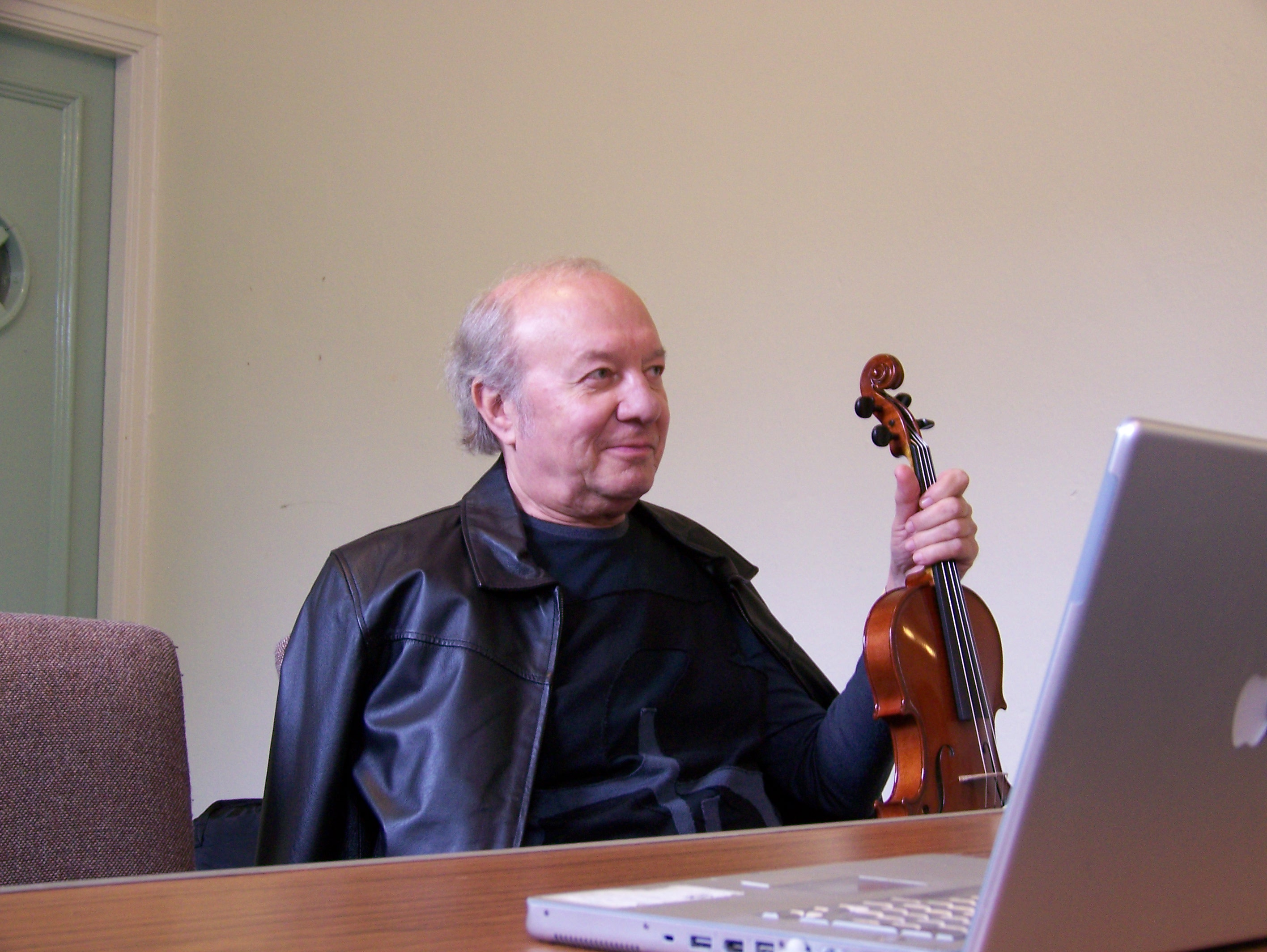
- János Négyesy at the ICMC 2008

Background information
- Born: Négyesy János; September 13, 1938; Budapest, Hungary
- Died: December 20, 2013 (aged 75) San Diego, California, U.S.
- Genres: Classical
- Occupations: Violinist, computer painter, pedagogue
- Instrument: Violin
- Years active: 1970–2013

János Négyesy (September 13, 1938 – December 20, 2013) was a Hungarian violinist with a particular interest in contemporary music. He performed world premieres of numerous works, the first two books of the Freeman Etudes (etudes I–XVI and XVII–XXXII) by American composer John Cage among others. He was also the first European violinist who recorded the complete Violin and Piano Sonatas of Charles Ives (with pianist Cornelius Cardew). He is the author of a teaching and reference book on violin techniques, which was commissioned after he met Pierre Boulez at IRCAM in 1976. In 1979, he joined the faculty of the University of California, San Diego.

He is also known for his computer paintings. He began doing these artworks after moving to San Diego, California.

== Biography ==
János Négyesy was born in Budapest, Hungary on September 13, 1938, and died on December 20, 2013. His father was taken by the Nazis to a concentration camp, from where he never returned. He got his first violin at the age of four, and only six months later he gave his first public concert at his school. According to him, this was the moment when he decided to become a violinist. He later became a student of Ferenc Gábriel at the Liszt Ferenc Academy of Music of Budapest, who introduced him to Tibor Varga, a former student of Gábriel before World War II. After receiving an invitation in 1965, Négyesy moved to Detmold and continued his studies with Varga. From 1970 to 1974 he served as concertmaster of the Radio Berlin Orchestra, which was led by Lorin Maazel at the time. In 1976 he was invited by French composer Pierre Boulez to IRCAM for a week of performances. This invitation resulted in a commission for Négyesy to write a book on violin techniques.

In 1979, while staying in Lisbon, he received an offer to join the Music Department at University of California, San Diego (UCSD). As of 2012, he is an active teacher at UCSD. It was there in San Diego where he met Finnish violinist Päivikki Nykter, a former student of his, who became his wife in 1992. During the past decades they made several recordings together, the complete violin duos of Béla Bartók and compositions dedicated to them, among others.

There are several composers who dedicated pieces to Négyesy (probably the most notable is One^{6} by John Cage) including Attila Bozay, Carlos Fariñas, Vinko Globokar, Georg Hajdu, Roger Reynolds, Robert Wittinger and Isang Yun. He also has notable recordings of pieces of composers like John Cage, Morton Feldman or Kaija Saariaho. Recently he also became regarded as a master of Max Mathews' electronic violin.

János Negesy died on December 20, 2013.

== Discography ==
- Dedications – Works for Two Violins – seven works for violin duo written expressly for János Négyesy and Päivikki Nykter. Aucourant Records, 2000.
- Solo Violin Recital – works by five contemporary women composers. Aucourant Records, 2006.

== See also ==
- List of Hungarians
