= Waldemar Bloch =

Austrian composer

Waldemar Bloch (1906–1984) was an Austrian composer.

He wrote several operas, including Stella, Das Käthchen von Heilbronn and Der Diener zweier Herren, as well as choral and instrumental works. His 1968 oratorio Passio Domini was particularly well received.

In 1957 Bloch was awarded the Outstanding Artist Award for Music by the Austrian Chancellery.

== Recordings ==
- Duo46, "Sonata" (1956) for Violin and Guitar, on FM 1: Homage to the 50s.
