= Utku Asuroglu =

Turkish composer

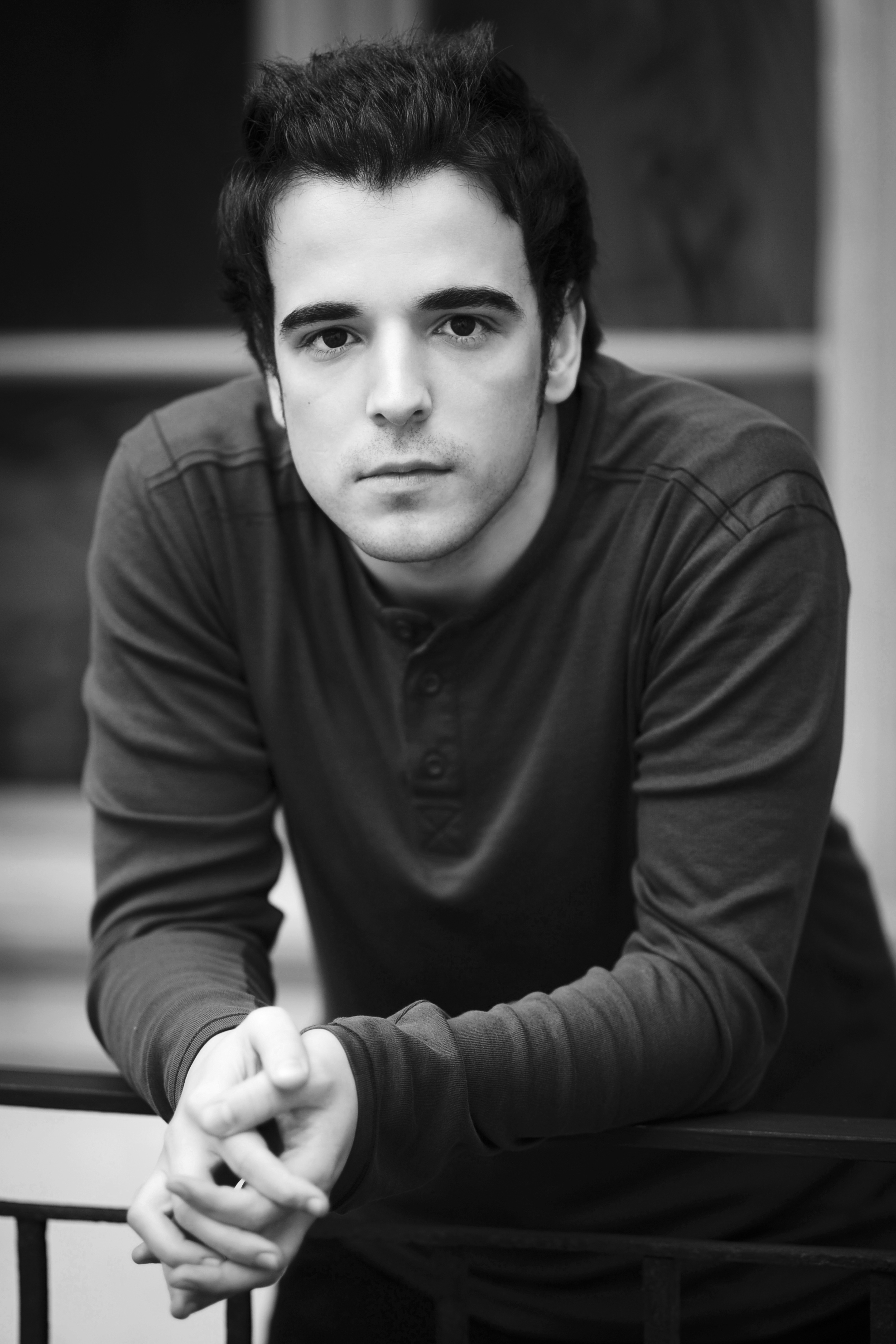
- Utku Asuroglu in 2013

Background information
- Born: 1986 (age 39–40); Istanbul, Turkey
- Genres: Contemporary classical, Electroacoustic music
- Occupations: Composer, Conductor
- Instrument: Pianist
- Years active: 2008-present
- Website: www.utkuasuroglu.com

Utku Asuroglu (born 1986 in Istanbul, Turkey) is a Turkish composer of acoustic and electro-acoustic music. He is the recipient of various awards including the 2024 Guggenheim Fellowship, 40th Irino Prize for Chamber Music, the Outstanding Artist Award for Music of the Austrian Ministry of Culture, and the 2021 Salvatore Martirano Memorial Composition Award. In 2014, Beat Furrer wrote: "The craftsmanship and form of his music unite to create an extraordinarily inspired art".

== Biography ==
Utku Asuroglu received his musical studies from the Codarts University for the Arts, University of Music and Performing Arts Graz, Freiburg Conservatory of Music and is currently a doctoral candidate at Stanford University. During these years he studied with Brian Ferneyhough, Clemens Gadenstätter and Gérard Pesson.

He won the 40th Irino Prize in 2019 and the Outstanding Artist Award for Music of the Austrian Ministry of Culture in 2016. He was a nominated finalist for the Gaudeamus Award in 2015, the Goethe Institute’s Asian Composers Showcase in 2016.

Notable festivals commissioning and featuring Asuroglu's works include Darmstädter Ferienkurse, Donaueschinger Musiktage, Gaudeamus Muziekweek, Wittener Tage für neue Kammermusik, Schleswig-Holstein, Manifeste IRCAM, MATA Festival and ISCM World Music Days.

A selection of his works can be found on the website of German contemporary music publisher Edition Gravis.

== Discography ==
Studio albums

- Serendipity (2024, TRPTK)
  includes Karli Kayin Ormaninda for oboe and piano
  Serol Yapici, Hector Sanz Castillo
- Kaynasma | Fusion (2021, Gedik Sanat)
  includes Tirnak for string quartet
- Unvoiced Diaries (2021, Gedik Sanat)
  includes Solo for violin
  Onder Balci
- Blot Out (2021, Orange Baboon)
  includes Blot Out for ensemble
  Talea Ensemble
- Chest of Toys (2018, Coviello)
  includes Hayirli Olsun for small ensemble
  Riot Ensemble
- Turkish Recital (2018, Antre Music)
  includes Karli Kayin Ormaninda for clarinet and piano
  Emirhan Tuga, Edzo Bos
