= The Prague Post =

Newspaper

- Cover of The Prague Post on 3 November 2010
- Type: Weekly newspaper
- Format: Broadsheet
- Owner: The Prague Post s.r.o
- Publisher: Monroe Luther
- Editor: Raymond Johnston
- Founded: 1991
- Ceased publication: in print: 2013; online: 2016
- Headquarters: Prague, Czech Republic
- Website: praguepost.org

The Prague Post was an English language newspaper covering the Czech Republic and Central and Eastern Europe which published its first weekly issue on October 1, 1991. It published a printed edition weekly until July 2013, when it dropped the printed product but continued to produce online material. (The current website located at PraguePost.com has no affiliation with the original newspaper.) In 2016 the Prague Post filed for bankruptcy.

The Prague Post’s archives are available at Internet Archive: Digital Library of Free & Borrowable Texts, Movies, Music & Wayback Machine.

Compared to other Prague-based English newspapers, Prognosis 1991-1995 and Prague Pill 2001-2003 —the Prague Post was the longest running English-language newspaper in the Czech Republic. Its target audience included English-speaking expatriates living in the Czech Republic or neighboring countries, Czech readers seeking news from an international perspective and tourists visiting the Czech Republic. With a print run of about 19,000 copies, The Prague Post reached approximately 40,000 readers a week with its print edition published every Wednesday. In 2013, The Prague Post ceased its print edition and moved to an online-only format. Its website at its peak had 40,000 unique users generating 150,000 page views per month.

The history of the newspaper began in Prague, two years after the Velvet Revolution, specifically in 1991.

== Mission and goals ==
The Prague Post was an English-language information source in the Czech Republic through its newspaper, and related products and services.

The Prague Post newspaper was published by Prague Post, spol. s r.o. (spol. s r.o. = Ltd.).

== History ==
In July 1991, Lisa Frankenberg (now Lisa Leshne) and Kent Hawryluk, two employees of Prognosis, an English-language monthly newspaper in Prague which began publication in March 1991, came to the realization that there was a ripe market in the then Czechoslovakia for a weekly broadsheet newspaper.

Together with Monroe Luther, an investor from Houston, Texas, they formed Lion's Share Group, a privately held, Czech limited-liability company (spol s r.o.) that was created to be the information leader in the region. Kent Hawryluk served as Founding Publisher and Lisa Frankenberg as Founding General Manager. Other programs introduced at that time were the Business Network, Lion's Share Group Publishing and the Prague Post Foundation (set up separately as a Czech-registered, non-profit foundation, and which later became The Prague Post Endowment Fund with the change in Czech nonprofit laws).

The mission of The Prague Post was simple and direct: to publish the best possible English-language newspaper for and about the rapidly changing Czechoslovakia and more broadly, Central Europe. The aim was to place particular emphasis on news, business, and cultural listings.

Alan Levy, a foreign correspondent for the International Herald Tribune and author of So Many Heroes, an eyewitness account of the 1968 Warsaw Pact invasion of Czechoslovakia, was hired as the Founding Editor-in-Chief. The original staff hired by Levy included former reporters and editors from a wide range of magazines and daily newspapers, including the Sacramento Bee, Sacramento Union, The New York Review of Books, Business International, the Grinnell Herald-Register, Fortune magazine and the Tampa Tribune.

Lion's Share Group established the wholly owned subsidiary company Prague Post s.r.o. in March 1994 to take over the publishing of the newspaper, while Lion's Share Group became a holding company.

=== Chronological history ===
1991

The Prague Post, located in a small room off Old Town Square in Prague, debuted with a 12-page issue on 1 October 1991. The first paper covered news and business, offered a weekly calendar of listings and included a regular pub guide.

In late 1991, the paper moved to larger offices on Politických vězňů, off Wenceslas Square, and increased to 16 pages.

1992 In February 1992, "Night & Day", a redesigned and enlarged cultural listings section, was introduced. A regular features page concentrating on in-depth news, culture and lifestyle articles debuted in early May 1992.

The paper underwent extensive redesign, increased to 24 pages, switched street delivery days from Tuesdays to Wednesdays and moved printing operations to Frankfurt, Germany, on 18 November 1992. This enabled it to offer color capability to advertisers, higher quality print resolution and more timely international distribution. Several new regular sections appeared at this time including sports, "The Big Picture", a page devoted to news from Central and Eastern European regions and "East View", a column of material from other English-language newspapers in Central and Eastern Europe.

Kent Hawryluk's day-to-day involvement with the newspaper ended in December 1992, and Lisa Frankenberg took over the responsibilities of publisher. An additional suite of rooms was added to the offices at Politických vězňů and the staff continued to expand, along with the company's investment in computers and publishing equipment.

1993 A monthly supplement devoted to special news coverage about Slovakia and entertainment listings for Bratislava was introduced in January, 1993, but was later curtailed as reporting became more difficult in Slovakia. In July 1993, "Summer in the City" was published as a tabloid insert for the remaining weeks of the summer. The tabloid included up-to-the-minute travel information for tourists, filling in where the guidebooks left off.

The Prague Post launched special pullout sections on 1 September 1993: "Money & Markets," "Travel & Leisure" and "Real Estate." These sections, aimed at providing expert, specialized coverage, appeared on the first, second and third weeks of the month, respectively. The remaining week(s) of each month were filled with a series of special topics, including "Computers & Technology", "The Modern Office", "Human Resources" and "Fashion." The special sections have changed and evolved over the years in response to readers’ needs.

The newspaper moved into newly reconstructed offices in the historic YMCA building at Na Poříčí 12 on 1 December 1993.

1994 The Prague Post underwent a significant redesign on January 19, 1994, transforming the second section into the tabloid-size pullout "Night & Day". This newly designed pullout consisted of articles detailing culture, features, listings, and a Prague Profile. It also introduced several new additions such as the Service Page, Ask Eva (an advice column), My Gene Pool (a cartoon strip) and reviews. The front section of the paper, consisting of news, business, sports and opinion also received a design improvement at this time.

Later in 1994, "Night & Day" increased in size to include the classifieds section. At this time, the business editorial department also began publishing weekly researched industry lists that are included in the annual Book of Lists.

1995 The 1995 Book of Lists, under development throughout 1994, was published in early 1995. An updated version of the Book of Lists was published annually until 2000.

In 1995 the paper continued to grow in all areas as advertising revenue increased. The Prague Post began sponsoring two well-known events: the Karlovy Vary International Film Festival and the Valtice Arts Festival.

1996 The Prague Post celebrated its 5th anniversary on 28 September 1996, with a black-tie, gala evening at Národní Dům na Vinohradech, hosted by Publisher Lisa Frankenberg, and attended by over 1,000 guests with dignitaries, including five ambassadors, past and present employees and clients. This Gala event was a memorable evening, aptly marking a significant occasion in the life of the newspaper and its importance in the market. Lisa Frankenberg was accepted to Harvard Business School in Boston, and promoted Advertising Director Coleen Nelson to General Manager to take over the day-to-day operations of the newspaper.

The Prague Post added sponsorship of the Prague International Marathon in the summer of 1996, and published a 12-page, four-color tabloid Holiday Shopping Guide for the month of December.

1997 In April 1997, The Prague Post was awarded first place for ‘Excellence in Newspaper Marketing’ by the International Newspaper Marketing Association for an in-house marketing campaign.

On 1 April 1997, The Prague Post launched its website at www.praguepost.cz (today it is "www.praguepost.com"). The initial site offered several top stories from the weekly newspaper as well as information for tourists and relocation information for people planning to move to Prague. It quickly gained a significant following, particularly with readers based outside the Czech Republic.

1998 In May, 1998, Lisa Frankenberg returned to Prague from Harvard Business School where she received an MBA (Masters in Business Administration) to resume an active role in the day-to-day operations of the newspaper as President and Publisher.

1999 The newspaper underwent another significant redesign near the end of 1999. Randy Stano, winner of two Pulitzer prizes for design, was recruited to undertake the process of re-designing the newspaper. The Prague Post was granted an Award of Excellence for re-design by the Society of News Design.

The offices of The Prague Post were relocated to a two-story office space at Štěpánská 20 in Prague 1.

2000 Since its strong debut, The Prague Post has attracted much international media coverage, with articles about the paper and its staff appearing in USA Today, the Los Angeles Times, The Washington Post, The New York Times, Smithsonian, Fortune, The Columbia Journalism Review, Advertising Age, The European and Telegraph of London. In addition, the newspaper was profiled on BBC, NBC, CBS (60 Minutes and the CBS Evening News) and ABC (Prime Time Live and the ABC Evening News).

The Prague Post was re-launched with its new design and format on 19 January 2000. Printing of the newspaper was moved from Frankfurt to a printing house in Prague.

2001 The Prague Post received three design awards from the Society of News Design in 2001. The website was re-designed and re-launched in the autumn 2001. Its new face attracted new and existing readers with an estimated 10,000 hits per day.

2002-2003 The Prague Post introduced a successful new product – Dining Out Guide – first published in 2003. It is a guide to the finest culinary experiences in Prague.

2004 On 2 April 2004 Alan Levy died, aged 72. Two weeks later, The Prague Post said goodbye to its founding editor-in-chief in a public memorial service attended by numerous personalities of Czech political, business and cultural life.

2005 The company also worked toward improving the quality of the paper and the services provided, including the rest of its publishing portfolio – the Book of Lists and Dining Out Guide.

2006 In 2006, The Prague Post proudly celebrated its 15th birthday. The night was in recognition of The Prague Post's long-standing tradition as a reputable English-language newspaper in the Czech Republic.

Former and current staff were recognized on the night for their contributions to the development and growth of the Czech Republic's oldest and most popular English-language newspaper. Alan Levy was remembered and recognized on the night for his years of service and dedication to the paper.

2007 In 2007, two new supplements were added to the newspaper. The "Luxury Hotel Guide" was designed to provide an in-depth look into the luxury hotels around Prague, while the "Weddings" supplement offers insight into all facets of wedding planning.

In 2007, The Prague Post also helped with the revival of English-language theater in Prague with the launching of the first annual Prague Post Playwriting Contest.

2008 The Prague Post launches a digital edition for Amazon Kindle, the first paper in the Czech Republic to do so. Web vendor Amazon ranks it as the best-selling Czech newspaper in the Czech Republic on the device.

2010 The Prague Post Blogs section was launched, offering additional content not published in the newspaper on topics including politics, food, film, books, music, news and education.

2013 The Prague Post stops issuing a print version and moves to online-only distribution.

2016 The Prague Post files with the Czech insolvency registry Prague Post closes operations due to bankruptcy. PraguePost.Com is no longer an active website.

== Awards ==
The Prague Post has won a number of European awards for its innovative newspaper design. In November 2007, the paper saw a fifth consecutive win in the category of “Front Page Weekly Newspaper” as well as a Portfolio award for Design Editor Caroline Wren at the European Newspaper Awards.

“Layout has always been very important for us,” commented then managing editor Will Tizard. “It is necessary to reflect our progressive reporting style from various fields in the layout," he said, adding “we are very proud of Caroline Wren's work.”

In 2010, the paper won Best Sectional Front Page at the same event for its Tempo cover story on guerrilla knitting, "Going Rogue".

== Former staff ==
Past writers and other staff of The Prague Post have gone on to a wide range of positions in the international media as well as in other sectors. Here are some examples.

Lisa (Frankenberg) Leshne, the newspaper's co-founder, became Executive Director, International of The Wall Street Journal Online WSJ.com and now works as a Literary Agent and Talent Manager at the agency she founded, The Leshne Agency. She represents Ivan Klima, Deborah Copaken, Jesse Itzler, Julissa Arce, Jukebox the Ghost member and webcomic artist Tommy Siegel, AJ Mendez (AJ Lee), and Christie Pearce Rampone.

Mark Baker, the paper's first business editor, is the author of a number of travel guides, including books for Lonely Planet on Prague, the Czech Republic and Slovakia as well as guides for Frommer's, Fodor's and National Geographic Society among others.

Douglas Lytle served various roles at The Prague Post from 1991 until 1994 including managing editor. He is the author of Pink Tanks & Velvet Hangovers (North Atlantic Books/Frog Ltd) and bureau chief for Bloomberg News in the Czech Republic and Slovakia and an editor for Eastern Europe.

Will Tizard, former managing editor, is Central/Eastern Europe correspondent for Variety and the author and editor of several travel guides including the Time Out Prague Guide and National Geographic Traveler: Prague and the Czech Republic. He is also a journalism and documentary professor at Anglo-American University and documentary film maker based in the Czech Republic.

Ross Larsen was deputy news editor, news editor and senior editor at the Prague Post from 1992 to 1999. He later worked for search engine AltaVista in California and Dow Jones Newswires in London. He now works as an editor for Bloomberg News' EMEA Real Estate team in London.

Michael Mainville was a reporter at The Prague Post from 2001 to 2002. He now works as the Caucasus correspondent for Agence France-Presse.

Dean Calbreath was business editor of The Prague Post from 1993 to 1996. He is currently a reporter and columnist with The San Diego Union-Tribune and was part of an investigative reporting team that won the 2006 Pulitzer Prize.

Michael Wann, the technology and science editor for Msnbc.com, is a former managing editor of The Prague Post.

Siegfried Mortkowitz was a news reporter and columnist for The Prague Post from 1996 to 2001. He went on to work for Newsweek and later returned to Prague after working for 10 years as the Paris correspondent for the German Press Agency (Deutsche Presse-Agentur).

Dinah A. Spritzer served a variety of editorial roles for The Prague Post from 2001 to 2005. She presently writes on Central and Eastern Europe for The New York Times, USA Today and the Jewish Telegraphic Agency. She also teaches international reporting at New York University in Prague.

Kurt Vinion was a former staff photojournalist 2000-2001 and photo editor 2006-2008. He was awarded several 1st place awards in the Best of Photojournalism for his international social issue reporting as well as a hand full of awards in Czech Press Photo. He is currently a resident of Prague where he runs his own wedding & portrait business Prague Photographer - Portraits, Pre-Weddings, Couples in addition to guest lecturing at local universities.

James Pitkin was a former copy editor, culture editor and news reporter with The Prague Post. He went on to work for Willamette Week, an alternative newspaper in Portland, Oregon.

Richard Andrade was a designer with The Prague Post from 1993-1996. Since 1999 he has been the Founder and CEO of BarristerBooks, Inc., the entity which operates the Internet's largest network of independent legal academic bookstores.

Michele Legge was a Prague Post reporter from 1995 to 1999. She now manages media for the Australian Department of Families, Housing, Community Services and Indigenous Affairs in Canberra.

Andrew Greene was a business reporter and news reporter with The Prague Post from 2012-2013. He has resumed his position as a political reporter with the Australian Broadcasting Corporation in Canberra.

Clare Speak was a news reporter and editor at The Prague Post from 2013-2014. She is now the editor of English-language news website The Local Italy.

== Outreach projects ==
=== The Prague Post Endowment Fund ===
The Prague Post Endowment Fund began as the Prague Post Foundation, a local non-profit organization founded in 1992. The goals were to enrich education and foster a place for the non-profit sector in the Czech Republic. Originally the PPF published a weekly column, "Networking," which was the only source of news and information about the newly developing Czech Civil Society and non-profit sector. It also provided bi-weekly English-language education programs based on The Prague Post newspaper for secondary schools throughout the Czech Republic and Slovakia.

In 1997, Czech laws changed to recognize the increasing role of non-profit organizations. The Prague Post Foundation became The Prague Post Endowment Fund. Educational materials were sent along with The Prague Post to more than 60 schools throughout the Czech Republic. The Fund provided scholarships and supported young journalists.

=== The Prague Post Playwriting Contest ===
The Prague Post Playwriting Contest started in 2007 with the goal of bringing together artists and the theater-going community. For its inaugural year, more than 100 scripts were submitted. Organized in conjunction with The Prague Playhouse, a local English-language theater company, the contest theater entertainment for the expat community and also sought to help galvanize local writers, actors, producers and directors.

== See also ==
- List of newspapers in the Czech Republic
