= Marcel Rubin =

Austrian composer (1905–1995)

Marcel Rubin (7 July 1905 – 12 May 1995) was an Austrian composer.

Born in Vienna, where he studied with Richard Robert and Franz Schmidt, he later emigrated to Paris, where he pursued further studies with Darius Milhaud. After living in Mexico City for a while, he returned to Vienna after the end of World War II.

Among the works he composed there are ten symphonies and the opera Kleider machen Leute (1969).

== Honours and awards ==
- 1959: State Prize for Music
- 1961 and 1965: Award from the Theodor-Körner Foundation
- 1964: Title of Professor
- 1969: City of Vienna Prize for Music
- 1970: Grand Austrian State Prize for Music
- 1974: Austrian Cross of Honour for Science and Art, 1st class
- 1979: Honorary Member of the Austrian Society for Contemporary Music
- 1980: Austrian Decoration for Science and Art
- 1985: Honorary Member of the Society of Friends of Music in Vienna
- 1986: Gold Medal of Vienna

== Selected compositions ==
Stage works

- Die Stadt, ballet (1933, rev. 1980)
- Kleider machen Leute, opera (1969)
- Der Schneider im Himmel, fairy tale in music (1981)

Cantatas & oratorios

- Die Albigenser (1961)
- O ihr Menschen. Ein Heiligenstädter Psalm (1977)
- Auferstehung (1986)
- Licht über Damaskus (1988)

Orchestral works

- Ten symphonies (between 1928 and 1986)
- Concertos for double bass (1970), trumpet (1972), bassoon (1976), piano (1992), flute & strings (1994)
- Sinfonietta for string orchestra (1966)

Chamber music

- 6 string quartets (between 1926 and 1991)
- String Trio (1927, rev. 1962)
- Sonata, for cello and piano (1928)
- Sonata, for violin and piano (1974)
- Concertino, for 12 cellos (1975)

Solo instrumental

- 4 piano sonatas (between 1925 and 1994)
- Tageszeiten. 4 piano pieces (1955)
- Petite Sérénade pour Guitare (1977)
- Klaviermusik 94, for piano (1994)

== See also ==
- List of Austrians in music
