= Dorothy Khadem-Missagh =

Austrian pianist

Dorothy Khadem-Missagh (born 26 November 1992) is an Austrian pianist and conductor.

== Life ==
Born in Austria as the youngest child of a family of musicians Dorothy Khadem-Missagh grew up in Baden bei Wien. As a pianist and conductor she continues the musical work of her family in the fourth generation. Her father Bijan Khadem-Missagh is a violinist and conductor. He is the founder and long-time artistic director of the international chamber music festival Allegro Vivo and was concertmaster of the Tonkünstler-Orchester Niederösterreich. Her sister Martha and brother Vahid are violinists.

She received her first piano lessons at the age of three. At age six she was admitted to the University of Music and Performing Arts Vienna. She studied there with Noel Flores, Stefan Arnold and Jan Jiracek von Arnim, among others as well as with Pavel Gililov at Mozarteum University Salzburg. At the Verbier Festival and similar settings she received musical impulses from Martha Argerich, András Schiff, Ferenc Rados, Arie Vardi, Robert Levin, Gábor Takács-Nagy and Menahem Pressler.

In 2011, Dorothy Khadem-Missagh made her debut in the Golden Hall of the Vienna Musikverein as soloist in Joseph Haydn's Piano Concerto in D Major. Furthermore, she has performed in halls such as Konzerthaus Vienna, Philharmonie Luxembourg, Seoul Arts Center, and at Festivals like the Verbier Festival, Styriarte Graz, Palermo Classica, Mosel Musikfestival, Liszt Festival Raiding, and Tiroler Festspiele Erl. She appeared as soloist with the Tonkünstler Orchestra, Vienna Chamber Orchestra, Soul Seongnam Philharmonic Orchestra among others and played chamber music concerts with Patrick Demenga, Christian Altenburger, Julia Hagen, Jiyoon Lee, Matthias Bartolomey as well as members of the Vienna Philharmonic.

Dorothy Khadem-Missagh made her debut as a conductor with the Vienna Chamber Orchestra and further conducted the Moravian Philharmonic Orchestra as well as the Beethoven Frühling Festival Orchestra, which she founded. She studied orchestral conducting at the Royal Academy of Music in London.

Her concert tours have taken her throughout Europe, Japan, China, the USA, and Canada. She has given world premieres and first performances of contemporary works by Friedrich Cerha, Avner Dorman, and Christoph Ehrenfellner.

On the occasion of the Beethoven Year 2020, she founded the Beethoven Frühling Festival, which takes place annually under her artistic direction at Beethoven-related sites such as Baden bei Wien, Wiener Neustadt, and Gneixendorf.

== Awards ==
Khadem-Missagh is a multiple prize winner of the International Telekom Beethoven Competition Bonn, the International Piano Competition "Ricard Viñes" and the 13th International Piano Competition for Young Pianists in Ettlingen. She is the winner of the International Béla Bartók Competition Vienna, finalist of the New York International Piano Competition and has won many awards in other international and national competitions. She was named a "Bösendorfer Artist" by the Viennese piano manufacturer Bösendorfer.

== Discography ==
Her solo album "Beethoven & Zeuner" (2020) and includes works by Ludwig van Beethoven and the first recording of "Fantaisie Op. 7" by Karl Traugott Zeuner. Dorothy Khadem-Missagh discovered this piece in the archive of the Gesellschaft der Musikfreunde Vienna. It is the first recording of a work by Karl Traugott Zeuner. The album was nominated in several categories for the Opus Klassik.

In 2021, the album "Auftakt" by Trio Vision, which Dorothy Khadem-Missagh founded along with two members of the Vienna Philharmonic - violinist Ekaterina Frolova and solo-cellist Peter Somodari - was released. It features piano trios by Ludwig van Beethoven, Johannes Brahms, and Hans Gál.

In 2022, Ö1 Edition released a live recording of Dorothy Khadem-Missagh and Michael Niavarani, created as part of the "Lieblingsgedichte" series at the ORF Funkhaus.
