= Robert Schollum =

Austrian composer and conductor

Robert Schollum (22 August 1913 – 30 September 1987) was an Austrian composer, conductor, music educator, music critic, musicographer and academic scholar. He was president of the Austrian Composers Association for several years in the 1960s and 1980s.

== Life and career ==
=== Education ===
Born in Vienna, Schollum studied composition with Joseph Marx, music theory with Egon Lustgarten and organ and piano with Carl Lafite at the Neues Wiener Konservatorium and the University of Music and Performing Arts Vienna. He taught as assistant to Anton Maria Klafsky at the New Vienna Conservatory and gave piano lessons at the Conservatory for Folk Music.

=== National Socialism ===
In 1932, Schollum joined the Hitler Youth, later also the SA. From 1933, he performed as a conductor. From 1939 to 1945, he did military service with the Wehrmacht, and after being wounded, he served as a purser on the Russian Front. In addition, he worked as a pianist, conductor and choir director for the Hitler Youth and was a district commissioner of the Reich Chamber of Music for music education. After the airstrike of his Vienna flat in 1944, he moved to Ottensheim near Linz.

=== Career after the Second World War ===
From 1945, Schollum was choirmaster at the Old Cathedral, Linz and also directed the Ignatius Choir, the Sängerbund "Frohsinn" and the Linz Chamber Orchestra. In 1946, he became head of the Linz Municipal Music Directorate, in 1952 music advisor to the Department of Culture and in 1953 municipal music director. He founded the Linz section of the International Society for New Music, whose "Arnold Schönberg Medal" he received in 1953.

From 1955, Schollum conducted the Vienna City Serenade, in the same year he founded the Musical Youth of Austria. In 1956, he became regional choir master of the Österreichischer Arbeitersängerbund. In Linz as well as in Vienna he made radio broadcasts on a case-by-case basis.

In 1958 he was awarded the Professor title, the following year he was appointed Professor of Lied and Oratorio at the University of Music and Performing Arts Vienna; he held this post until 1983. In 1960, he was awarded the Honorary Prize of the Federal Ministry of Education, Science and Culture for outstanding achievements in the field of popular education; in 1961, he received the State Prize for Music and in 1971 the Preis der Stadt Wien für Musik.

From 1963, Schollum was the national choir director of the Workers' Singers' Association. From 1965 to 1969 and from 1983 to 1984, he was president of the Austrian Composers' Association. In 1973, he was made an honorary member. In 1978, he was awarded the Austrian Decoration for Science and Art and the Ehrenmedaille der Bundeshauptstadt Wien in gold.

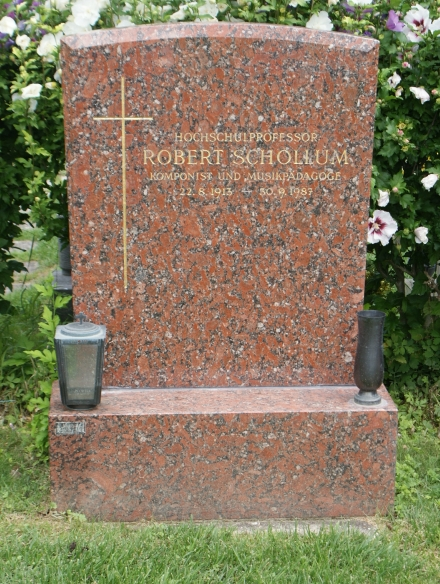
Robert Schollum's gravesite

Schollum died in Vienna at the age of 74. He is buried in an honorary grave (group 40, number 157) at the Vienna Central Cemetery.

== Work ==
Already as a student, Schollum composed more than 100 Volkslied movements. Later, his compositions were first in the tradition of Claude Debussy, then in that of Béla Bartók and Darius Milhaud. In the 1950s, he then moved on to partly tonally bound serial compositions. His oeuvre encompasses almost all genres from instrumental solo works, chamber music, choral works and songs to instrumental concertos and symphonies. His estate is housed in the music collection of the Austrian National Library.

== Publications ==
- Musik in der Volksbildung (1959)
- Egon Wellesz (1964)
- Das kleine Wiener Jazzbuch (1969)
- Die Wiener Schule (1969)
- Das österreichische Lied des 20. Jahrhunderts (1977)
