= Kurt Rapf =

Austrian composer, conductor and organist

Kurt Johann Rapf (15 February 1922 – 9 March 2007) was an Austrian composer, conductor and organist.

== Life ==
Born in Vienna, Rapf studied conducting, organ, harpsichord, piano and musical composition at the University of Music and Performing Arts Vienna. After his studies he was engaged as assistant to Hans Knappertsbusch at the Zurich Opera House during the 1948/1949 season. From 1949 to 1953 he was professor at the University of Music and Performing Arts Vienna. Subsequently, he was music director of the city of Innsbruck until 1960 and thus also principal conductor of the Tiroler Symphonieorchester Innsbruck. From 1960 Rapf worked as a freelance conductor, organist, composer and piano accompanist. In 1968 he took over a class "Repertoire Studies" for singers and instrumentalists at the Music and Arts University of the City of Vienna.

Shortly after the end of the Second World War, Rapf founded the "Collegium Musicum Wien" which he directed until 1956. In 1986 he founded a chamber orchestra, the "Wiener Sinfonietta". From 1970 he was until 1987 head of the music department in the Cultural Office of the City of Vienna and from 1970 until 1983 president of the Austrian Composers' Association. As a conductor he made numerous tours abroad.

As a composer he created over 150 works, including an opera, two oratorios, four symphonies, numerous orchestral works, vocal, organ and chamber music. In 1981 he was the only European to receive the Outstanding Composition Award for the composition and premiere of his orchestral work "Poème symphonique" at the Yamaha Festival in Tokyo.

Rapf died in Vienna at the age of 85.

== Awards and honours ==
- 1970 – Professorentitel
- 1981 – Yamaha-Festival, Tokio: Outstanding Composition Award
- 1982 – Austrian Decoration for Science and Art
- 1988 – Preis der Stadt Wien für Musik
- 1992 – Ehrenzeichen für Verdienste um das Land Wien
- 2002 – Decoration of Honour for Services to the Republic of Austria
- Honorary membership of the Austrian Composers' Association and other organizations
