= Karl Heinz Füssl =

Austrian composer and musicologist

Karl Heinz Füssl (21 March 1924 – 4 September 1992) was an Austrian composer and musicologist.

== Life ==
Born in Gablonz, (Czechoslovakia), Füssl went to study in Berlin and began his training with Konrad Friedrich Noetel (composition), Gerd Otto (piano) and Hugo Distler (choral conducting). After the Second World War, he settled in Vienna and began his studies with Alfred Uhl (composition), Erwin Ratz (musical analysis), and Hans Swarowsky (conducting). Füssl was also active as a music critic and worked as an editor for Universal Edition. On the one hand, he was entrusted with the Urtext editions, and on the other, he was involved in the publication of the works of Haydn, Mozart and Johann Strauss II. On the part of the Internationale Gustav Mahler Gesellschaft, Füssl was entrusted with the publication of the Gustav-Mahler-Gesamtausgabe. At the World Music Days of the International Society for Contemporary Music (ISCM World Music Days), Epitaph (Variations for Orchestra, world premiere) was performed in Zurich in 1957 and the Concerto Rapsodico in Copenhagen in 1964. Füssl died in Eisenstadt at the age of 68 and was buried at the Vienna Central Cemetery

== Awards ==
- 1953: Prize at the Composition Competition of the Vienna Symphony Orchestra
- 1962: Promotion Prize of the City of Vienna.
- 1970: Staatspreis für Musik
- 1976: Preis der Stadt Wien für Musik.
- 1984: Golden Ehrenzeichen für Verdienste um das Land Wien
- 1990: Austrian Decoration for Science and Art

== Work ==
=== Music for ensemble ===
- Concertino I – after poems by William Shakespeare (1947/1948).
- Dialogue in praise of the owl and the cuckoo – Two movements after poems by William Shakespeare, op. 3a (1947/1961).
- Concertino II – for clarinet and piano four hands, op. 5/2 (1952).
- Landschaften – Five Variations for Voice and Four Instruments after texts by Marie Pappenheim (1957).
- An Herrn Dr.Alfred A. Kalmus (Muridae 25) – A special study on the importance of mice in modern publishing (Improvisation mélodramatique) (1963).
- Cantiunculae amoris – Three Latin Chants, text: Ovid, op. 15 (1975).
- Nachtmusik – Trio for violin, viola and violoncello, op.19 (1977/1988).
- Ragtime – für Gitarre und Klavier, op.18 (1977).
- Ländler al Rovescio, IV – Trio for violin, viola and violoncello, (1977).
- Aphorismen über rhythmische Modelle – Theme and five variations for clarinet and piano, op. 20 (1978/1980).
- Improvisation in siebenmal zehn Takten auf den Namen Dr. Hertha Firnberg – Quartet for two violins, viola and violoncello (1979).
- Les Rondeaux – Drei Duette für zwei Violinen (1980/1981).
- Hälfte des Lebens – Eight Lieder after Friedrich Hölderlin for high voice, flute, violin (viola) and harp, op. 24 (1981/1988).
- Ekloge – for violoncello and piano, op. 43 (1987/1989).
- Perpetuum mobile – for Oboe and piano, op. 42a,b (1987).
- Ricercare – Quartet for two violins, viola and violoncello, op. 58 (1991).
- Cantus II – Quartet for two violins, viola and violoncello, op. 57 (1991).

=== Vocal music ===
- Görög Ilona – Transylvanian Folk Ballad for mixed choir a cappella and instruments ad lib., op. 3 (1948/1971).
- Ho-ruck nach links! – Solo for voice, choir (unison) and piano, text: Otto Horn (1949).
- Hommage à Alfred Schlee – Canones diversi (1961).
- Epitaph – for mixed choir and orchestra, op. 7, text: Gerard Manley Hopkins (1966).
- Missa trium vocium – for mixed choir (three voices) and organ, op. 10a (1966).
- Drei Szenen aus Dybuk – for two baritones, soprano, tenor, choir and orchestra, op. 11a (1968) – Premiere: 16 February 1968 in Vienna.
- An Hans Erich Apostel – Twelve-tone homage cycle in seven parts for mixed choir and a unique occasion (for the 70th birthday) (1971).
- Wenn aus der Ferne – Cantata after Friedrich Hölderlin for high voice and organ, op. 30 (1983).
- Kain – A sacred play by Herbert Lederer, op. 37 (1984–1986).
- Missa per cantare e sonare – Sacred music for choir (monophonic) and organ, op. 10b (1986).
- Suspirium ad amorem – Two cantatas for choir and strings, op. 38 (1986).
- Das Gedächtnis der Wörter – Two comments on Hölderlin for solo and string orchestra, text: Julian Schutting, op. 52 (1989).
- Im Osten – Motet for male choir, organ and percussion, text: Georg Trakl, op. 54 (1990).
- Resurrexit (The resurrection) – A musical play. Derived from The Chester Mystery Cycles of Mystery Plays, op.60 (1991/1992).

=== Opera/Theater music ===
- Faustus – Opera fragment, text: Hanns Eisler (1966/1967).
- Sintflut – Opera fragment (1972).
- Celestina – two-act opera after Fernando de Rojas by Herbert Lederer, op. 14 (1973–1975/1981).
