= Dieter Kaufmann =

Austrian composer (1941–2025)

- Kaufmann c. 2010
- Born: 22 April 1941; Vienna, Reichsgaue of the Ostmark
- Died: 23 September 2025 (aged 84)
- Occupations: Classical composer; Academic teacher
- Organizations: Vienna Music Academy; ISCM
- Awards: Ernst Krenek Prize

Dieter Kaufmann (22 April 1941 – 23 September 2025) was an Austrian composer, and a pioneer of electroacoustic music. He headed the new Institut für Komposition und Elektroakustik at the Vienna Music Academy from 1970, following models in Paris and Cologne. He held leading positions in Austrian and international organisations. He composed for voices, traditional instruments and electronics, often in combinations. Some were inspired by his socio-political interests.

== Life and career ==
Kaufmann was born in Vienna on 22 April 1941 and grew up in Carinthia. He studied music, German philology and art history at the University of Vienna, graduating in 1964. He then studied cello and composition with Karl Schiske and Gottfried von Einem, followed by further study of composition with Olivier Messiaen and René Leibowitz in Paris from 1967 to 1969. He came into contact with electroacoustic music with Pierre Schaeffer and François Bayle at the Groupe de Recherches Musicales, which was supported by Radio France.

Kaufmann worked as a chorus singer at the Vienna State Opera, the Volksoper Wien and Theater an der Wien from 1963 to 1967, and also for the ORF broadcaster from 1966. From 1970 he taught electro-acoustic music at the Vienna Music Academy. A course had been founded there in 1963, headed by Friedrich Cerha. Kaufmann installed the Institut für Komposition und Elektroakustik (ELAK). The new studio followed the models of Paris and Karlheinz Stockhausen at the WDR in Cologne. It was then the only institution of the kind at a music academy. For a while, the topic attracted only few students, and tapes were edited with scissors. He developed the institute over decades to an influential position in the field. He headed the class for composition at State Conservatory of Carinthia from 1983 to 1990. He was professor at the University of Music and Performing Arts Vienna in Vienna from 1991 to 2006.

In 1975 Kaufmann founded, together with his wife Gunda König, the K&K Experimentalstudio in Vienna, an ensemble for musical theatre that toured in Europe, North America, Latin America, Egypt and Taiwan. Kaufmann was president of the Austrian ISCM section from 1983 to 1988 and president of the Society for Electro-acoustic Music in Austria (GEM) from 1988 to 1990. From 2001 to 2003 he was president of the Austrian Composers Union and in 2001 he became president of "Austro Mechana", the Austrian Copyright Society administering the mechanical rights of authors.

Kaufmann composed works in several fields of music: chamber, symphonic, and vocal music, musical theatre (four operas and many multi-media works), piano and organ works, works for wind orchestra, electro-acoustic, live electronic and computer music, as well as works in applied art. He was awarded numerous national and international prizes, including the Förderungspreis der Stadt Wien (1967), Förderungspreis des Landes Kärnten (1974), Kompositionspreis des Musikprotokolls beim Steirischen Herbst (1975), Magisterium für elektroakustische Musik in Bourges, France (1988), Ernst Krenek Prize of the City of Vienna (1990), Prize of the City of Vienna for Music (1991), Würdigungspreis des Landes Kärnten (1992), Würdigungspreis des Bundes (1996). He was awarded the Landeskulturpreis of Carinthia on 2008.

Among his notable students is Lukas Ligeti.

=== Personal life ===
Kaufmann was married to Gunda König, a singer and actress. He died on 23 September 2025, at the age of 84.

== Work ==
Kaufmann composed works in several genres: chamber music, symphonic works and music for wind bands, vocal music, musical theatre including four operas and many multi-media works, audio plays, music for piano and organ, electro-acoustic, live electronic and computer music, as well as works in applied art. Pieces such as Paganihilismo question virtuosity. He pursued socio-political themes, and he composed "music about music", often seeking connections between material from music history in dialogue.

He wrote works with a socio-political background; Der Tod des Trompeters Kirilenko was written in memory of a composer murdered by the Nazis. His opera Requiem für Piccoletto written for the Mozart year 2006, was based on a libretto by the Austrian writer Josef Winkler. His monodrama fuge – unfug – e for a woman speaker, trombone and orchestra, premiered at the Neue Oper Wien, was based on Elfriede Jelinek's 1998 play er nicht als er, with word play in the title of "Fuge" (fugue) and "Unfug" (nonsense). He based music on texts by authors such as Robert Musil and Ingeborg Bachmann.

In 2007 Kaufmann composed a work lasting about one hour, Sympohonie Acousmatique, Op. 109, subtitled Brücken und Brüche 1969 bis 2007, documenting the development of his aesthetic development and also of the development in electroacoustic music over 40 years, in its "bridges and breaks".
