= Šimon Voseček =

Austrian-Czech composer

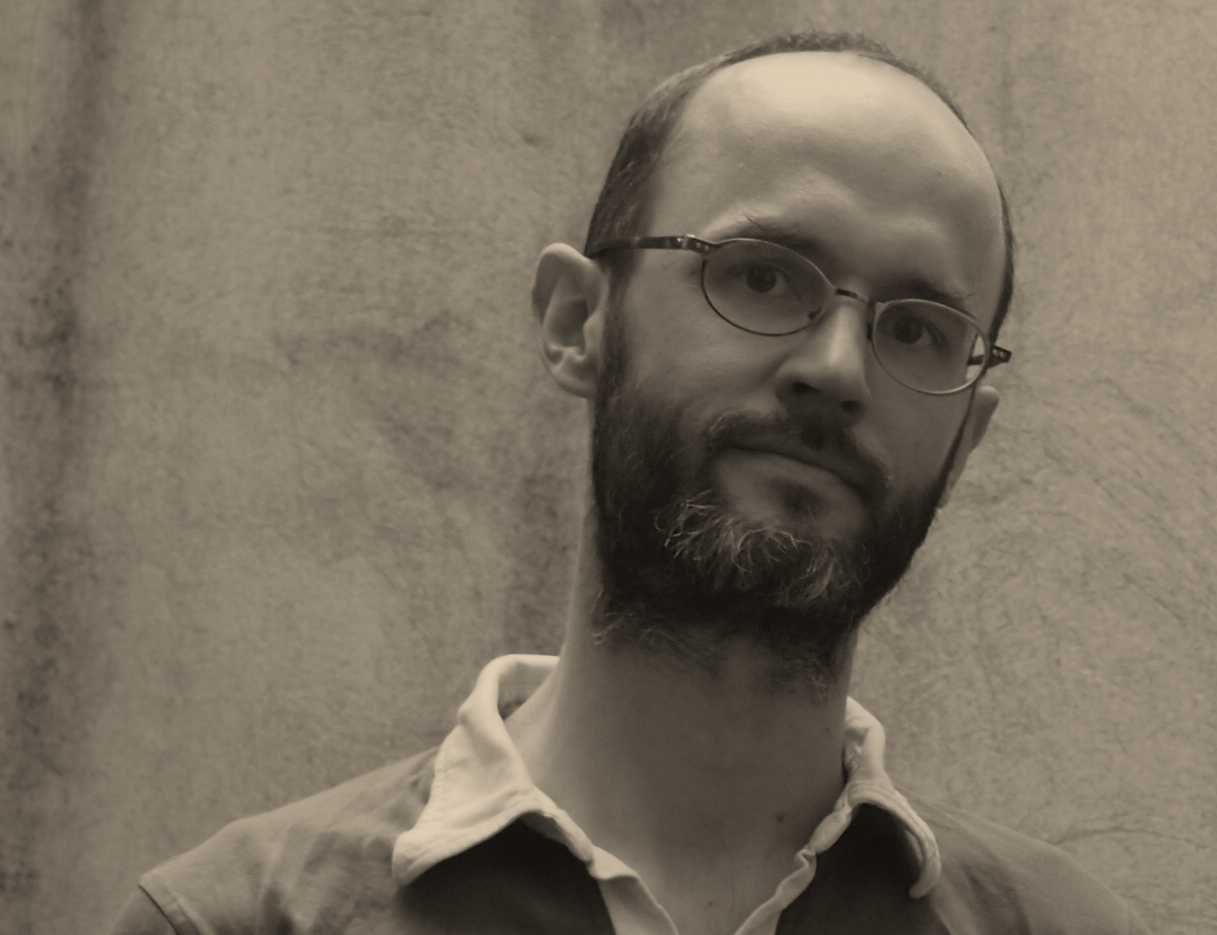
Šimon Voseček, composer

Šimon Voseček (born 13 April 1978) is an Austrian-Czech composer. He is known for his opera Biedermann und die Brandstifter (Biedermann and the Arsonists, (2005–2007; 2013; 2015), which was premiered in Vienna by Neue Oper Wien in 2013).

== Biography ==
Šimon Voseček was born in Prague, where he studied, dance, piano and organ. After finishing school, he studied composition at the Prague Conservatory with Otomar Kvěch. He later moved to Vienna to continue his studies at the University of Music and Performing Arts, Vienna with Dietmar Schermann, Erich Urbanner and Chaya Czernowin.

Since 2008 he lives as a freelance artist in Vienna, combining diverse activities such as writing music, acting in theatre, directing theatre productions, but also organizing events with contemporary music. His opera Biedermann and the Arsonists won the Outstanding Artist Award for Music of the Austrian Ministry of Culture in 2008.

== Selected works ==
- Soudničky (Cheerful district court), Opera in 3 Acts, Libretto: Jan Panenka (1999/2008)
- Biedermann und die Brandstifter (opera), Opera in 2 Acts after Max Frisch, Libretto: Šimon Voseček, for 8 voices and orchestra (2005–2007; 2013; 2015). World premiere 2013 Neue Oper Wien in Vienna, (director: Béatrice Lachaussée, conductor: Walter Kobéra) and Bozen, Italy. The English premiere of Biedermann and the Arsonists translated by David Pountney was performed 2015 by the Independent Opera at Sadler's Wells (director: Max Hoehn, conductor: Tim Redmond). The German premiere of the opera took place 2017 in Stadttheater Bremerhaven (director: Christian von Götz, conductor: Thomas Kalb).
- Hybris (Hubris), Opera in 2 Acts after a libretto by Kristine Tornquist, for 9 voices and orchestra (2015/16). World premiere 2016 in Vienna, (director: Kristine Tornquist, conductor: François-Pierre Descamps), sirene Operntheater
- Im Säurebad (In Acid Bath), String quartet (2008)
- Migraine, Orchestra (2011)
- Mice, Ensemble and Video (2012)
- Sperms, Sopranino recorder & Piccolo flute (2010)
- Hallutinations, Ensemble (2015); music for the experimental film Mechanical Principles by Ralph Steiner (1930)

== Membership ==
- International Society for Contemporary Music
