= Georg Hajdu =

German composer of Hungarian descent (born 1960)

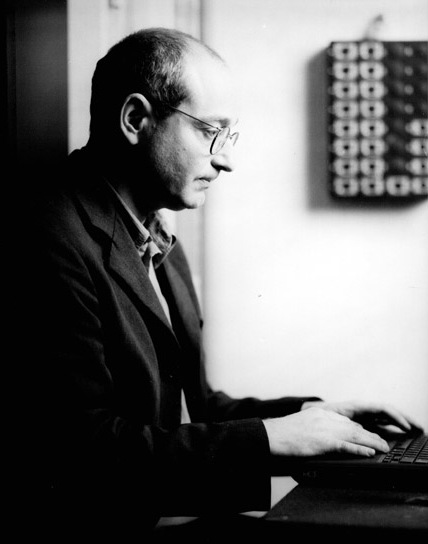
Georg Hajdu

Georg Hajdu (born 21 June 1960) is a German composer of Hungarian descent. His work is dedicated to the combination of music, science and computer technology. He is noted for his opera Der Sprung – Beschreibung einer Oper and the network music performance environment Quintet.net.

== Biography ==
Hajdu was born in Göttingen to Hungarian parents who had fled their country in 1956. He grew up in Cologne where he obtained diplomas in molecular biology and musical composition from the University of Cologne and the Cologne Musikhochschule, resp. A stipend by the German Academic Exchange Service enabled him to enter the graduate program in composition at the University of California, Berkeley in 1990, working closely with the Center for New Music and Audio Technologies (CNMAT) and eventually obtaining a Ph.D. in 1994. His teachers include Georg Kröll, Johannes Fritsch, Krzysztof Meyer, Clarence Barlow, Andrew Imbrie, Jorge Liderman and David Wessel. He also audited classes with György Ligeti in Hamburg.

In 1996, following residencies at IRCAM and the ZKM, Karlsruhe, he co-founded the Ensemble WireWorks with his wife, pianist Jennifer Hymer—a group specializing in the performance of mixed-media composition. In 1999, he produced his full-length opera Der Sprung – Beschreibung einer Oper, for which author and film director Thomas Brasch wrote the libretto. In May 2002, his interactive networked performance environment Quintet.net was employed in a Munich Biennale opera performance. In 2004, he instigated the development of the Bohlen–Pierce clarinet and in 2005 he co-founded the European Bridges Ensemble for networked music performance.

In addition to his compositions, which are characterized by a pluralistic attitude and have earned him several international prizes, the IBM-prize of the Ensemble Modern (1990) among them, Hajdu published articles on several topics on the borderline of music and science. His areas of interest include multimedia, microtonality, algorithmic, interactive and networked music performance. He has been directing a number of international projects with media centers and universities in Europe and the USA. In 2010, he was visiting professor at Northeastern University and artist in residence at the Goethe-Institut in Boston. Currently, Georg Hajdu is professor of multimedia composition and music theory at the Hamburg Hochschule of Music and Theater. He organized the Sound and Music Computing Conference and Summer School 2016.

== Works ==
=== Compositions (selection) ===
- Blueprint for soprano saxophone, electric guitar, double bass, piano, percussion, electronics and video (2009)
- Radio Music (adaptation of John Cage's Radio Music for network ensemble008)
- Beyond the Horizon for 2 Bohlen–Pierce clarinets and synthesizer (2008)
- Ivresse '84 for violin and laptop quartet (2007)
- Corpus Callosum for recorder, viola da gamba, bass clarinet and harpsichord (2006)
- Tsunami for recorder or toy piano and live electronics (2006–8)
- Light Blue for piano (2001–2004)
  - Dichrome Blue
  - Blue Marble
  - Kalim’balu
- Mindtrip for Quintet.net (2000–)
- StoryTeller for percussion and interactive media. Collaborative work with Stephan Froleyks (2001–2004)
- Exit for violin and live electronics (2001)
- Liebeserklärungen for one or two YAHAMA Disklaviers (2000/2004)
  - Herzstück
  - Blauer Engel
- Re: Guitar for microtonal guitar (1999)
- Der Sprung – Beschreibung einer Oper. Opera (1994–1998)
- Riots for saxophone, electric guitar and double bass (1993)
- Nacht for string quartet (1993)
- Spuren in der Kälte for accordion, plucked instruments and electronics (1991/95)
- Fingerprints for piano (1992–93)
- Klangmoraste for chamber orchestra (1990)
- Two Cartoons for Disklavier (1989/2006)
- Heptadecatonic Drops for MIDI instruments and computer in 17-tone equal temperament (1989/90)
- Xylis & Phloë, Leibeslied for double brass quintet (1989/2000)
- SLEEPLESSNESS for flute(s), narrator ad lib. and live electronics (1988/1997)
- Die Stimmen der Sirenen for saxophone quartet and tape (1986)
- Notorisch-Motorisch for string quartet (1985)
- LogaRhythmen für Klavier (1983)
- Drei frühe Lieder (1981–84)

=== Installations ===
- Drei Allegorien von C.D. Friedrich (2006)
- Flying Cities. Installation (2003)

=== Software ===
- Quintet.net
- Elektronische Studie II by Karlheinz Stockhausen
- Macaque – Audio to Music Notation software package
- DJster – MaxMSP implementation of Clarence Barlow's program AUTOBUSK

=== Publications ===
- Automatic Composition and Notation in Network Music Environments. SMC’06 Conference Proceedings. Marseille (2006)
- "Research and Technology in the Opera Der Sprung". Nova Acta Leopoldina, 92 Nr. 341. (2005)
- "Überlegungen zu einer neuen Theorie der Harmonie" in: Mikrotöne und mehr, edited by Manfred Stahnke, Schriftenreihe: Musik und. Volume 8. Edited by Hanns-Werner Heister and Wolfgang Hochstein. Weidler Verlag, Berlin (2005). pp. 165–187.
- "Der Computer als Inspirationsquelle für Komponisten" in: Mathematische Musik – musikalische Mathematik. Hrsg. Bernd Enders. PFAU-Verlag, Saarbrücken, 2005
- "Quintet.net: An Environment for Composing and Performing Music on the Internet", LEONARDO Vol. 38, No. 1 (2005)
- "Quintet.net". Neue Zeitschrift für Musik 5 (2004). p. 28.
- Composition and improvisation on the Net. SMC’04 Conference Proceedings. IRCAM, Paris (2004). pp. 5–8.
- "Quintet.net – A Quintet on the Internet". Proceedings of the International Computer Music Conference. (2003). pp. 315–318
- Georg Hajdu, "Quintet.net—Präliminarien zu einer vernetzten, interaktiven Echtzeitkompositionsumgebung," in Bernd Enders and Joachim Stange-Elbe, eds., Global Village—Global Brain—Global Music. Osnabrück: Universitätsverlag Rasch, 2003.
- "Klang im Internet. Potentiale und Grenzen". Positionen 56. (2003). pp. 22–23.
- "Vom Modell zum Kunstwerk. Klangart 1997 – Kongressbeitrag", in: Musik und Medientechnologie 3. Osnabrück, 2000.
- "Circularity in Neural Computation and Its Application to Musical Composition". Proceedings of the International Computer Music Conference, 1995.
- "Low Energy and Equal Spacing; the Multifactorial Evolution of Tuning Systems". Interface 22, 1993, 319–333.
- "Computermusik in der Bay Area. Das Center for New Music and Audio Technologies". Neue Zeitschrift für Musik 10, 1991.
- "Die Domestizierung des Zufalls in Klarenz Barlows Computerprogramm AUTOBUSK" (The Domestication of Chance in Clarence Barlow's Computer Program AUTOBUSK). Neue Zeitschrift für Musik 8–9, 1990.
