= Austrian State Prize =

Austrian award

The Austrian State Prize is an award given annually or biennially in various fields, including arts, environment, technology and innovation and economy for excellence achievements for the Austrian nation. The State Prize for artists is currently (2012) worth €8,000.

The categories are: in arts

Fine arts (first award in 1989)
Artistic Photography (first award in 1981)
Video and media art (first award in 2008)
Cartoon and Comics (biennial award, first award in 2008)
Experimental trends in architecture (biennial award, first award in 1988)
Adolf Loos Prize for Design (since 2001)
Arts and crafts (1989–1996)
Experimental Design (biennial award, first award in 1989)
Performing Arts (first award in 2010)
Music (first award in 1950)
Film (first award in 1979)
Literature (first award in 1950)
Children's Literature (biennial award, first award in 1996)
Current annual themes (first award in 2003)

in other fields

Environmental Engagement (since 1981)

== See also ==
- List of State Prizes of the Republic of Austria (in German)
