= Johannes Kretz =

Austrian composer

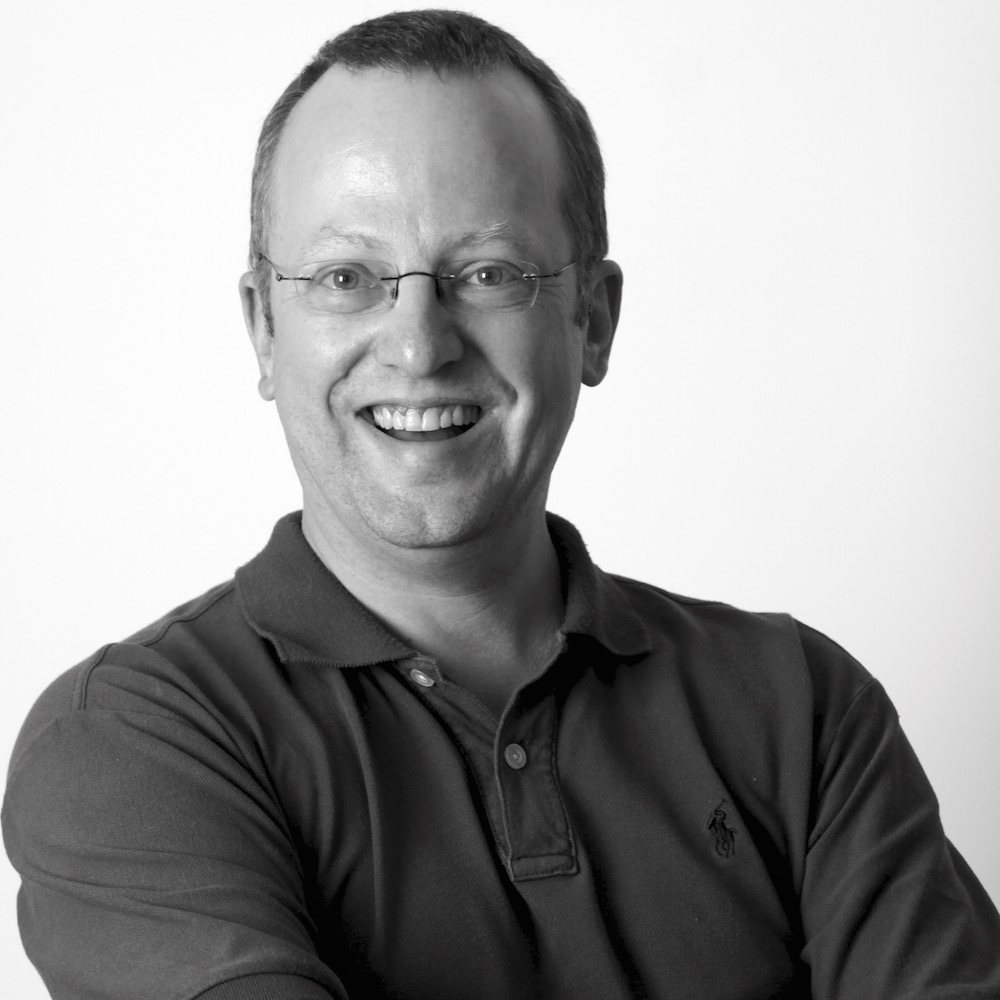
Johannes Kretz

Johannes Kretz (born 8 May 1968 in Vienna) is an Austrian composer and teacher for computer music and music theory. He lives and works in Vienna and created various compositions in the fields of new music, among those: music theatre, orchestra works, chamber music, sacred music and works with electronics. He won an Austrian State Prize for music in 2004.

== Prizes ==
- Prize of Delz foundation, Switzerland 2001
- Theodor Körner Prize 2003
- Austrian State Prize 2004
