= Jennifer Hymer =

American pianist

Jennifer Hymer is an American pianist, currently living in Hamburg, Germany.

== Education ==
Jennifer Hymer was trained as a pianist for classical and contemporary music at the University of California at Berkeley and Mills College studying with Bay Area pianist Julie Steinberg. She also studied privately with James Avery and Bernhard Wambach and participated in summer courses at Szombathely, Darmstadt and Avignon.

== Career ==
In 1996, she co-founded the ensemble WireWorks in the Münster, Germany, as well, in 2008, the Hymer-Fograscher piano duo, based in Hamburg, Germany. Hymer is noted for her projects expanding the possibilities of piano playing by focussing on extended techniques (inside piano), the use of electronics as well as performance on miniature pianos such as the toy piano or the African thumb piano also known as kalimba or m'bira. Her musical projects include the multimedia piano program Handscapes, Piano, Kalimba, Gadgets, Toy Piano, Karlheinz Stockhausen's Mantra for two pianos and electronics as well as Kalimba!Kontained for which she featured, for the first time in contemporary music, the kalimba as a solo instrument in a full evening program.

She has worked with numerous composers who have written pieces for her repertoire such as Alvin Curran, Roberto Morales, Helmut Oehring, Peter Michael Hamel, Silvia Matheus, Hanna Kulenty, Maria de Alvear, Matthias Kaul, Manfred Stahnke, Georg Hajdu, Dror Feiler, Annea Lockwood, Annie Gosfield, Karlheinz Essl, Reinhard Flender, Sascha Lino Lemke, Chris Brown, Oliver Schneller, Lukas Ligeti, Anthony De Ritis, among others. She performed at Musica Viva festival in Portugal, the Franz Liszt Academy in Budapest, the Ought-One Festival in Vermont, CCRMA (Stanford University), UC Santa Barbara, CNMAT (UC Berkeley), the Interpretation Series in Merkin Hall (New York), Laeiszhalle (Hamburg), Mills College (Oakland), Alte Feuerwache (Cologne), Schloss Moyland, Klangart Festival (Leipzig), Festival Neue Musik Lüneburg. Bang on a Can marathon (NY) as well as additional concerts in Mexico, Estonia, Tel Aviv and South America.

In 2010 she released her CD Ce n'est pas un piano with pieces by Tan Dun, Manfred Stahnke, Georg Hajdu, Cathy Milliken, Annie Gosfield, Annea Lockwood and Sascha Lemke produced by German label Ambitus.

She is a member and musical director of the Hamburg branch of GEDOK, a German/Austrian women's art organization.
