= Ulf-Diether Soyka =

Austrian composer, conductor and lecturer

Ulf-Diether Soyka (born 5 June 1954) is an Austrian composer, conductor and lecturer.

== Musical creation and compositional style ==
Soyka was born in Vienna, Austria. He prefers to write music for the concert hall, for orchestra, chamber music, choral works and operas. His compositional style was described by Dr. Werner Pelinka in 1987 in the cultural magazine morgen:

Soykas music is influenced by the twelve-tone system, but not by the dogmatic, serial kind. Rather it is an extended twelve-tone style, determined by melodic and rhythmic ideas, by emotions. It is just this emotional aspect which triggers an immediate response and understanding in the listener, even though one might not be able to follow every rational structure and detail. His tone language is varied, beautifully melodious as well as spirited and powerful in rhythm.

Soyka also investigated connections between chromatic and micro-interval music. Since 2007 he brought out his publication about micro interval composition theory. In 2012 he also brought out his (very melodic) opera Ninja, in which micro-tonality is assigned mainly to one of the principal characters, the Robot Androido, in order to underline the "emotions" of this character adequately.

== Selected compositions ==
- Operas, e.g. "Leyla" (premiered 2003 in the Künstlerhaus Wien), „Terpsichore“, „Ninja“ (premiered 2003 in Birmingham, England) among others
- Ballet music (e.g. "Das Idol", premiered 1990 in the Stadttheater Klagenfurt)
- three piano concertos (1st: CD with Alma Sauer and Oliver v. Dohnanyi 1987, 2nd: premiere in the Philharmonie Baku, Azerbaijan 1993, soloist: Rena Rzaeva, conductor: Rauf Abdullaev, 3rd:premiere 2012, Vienna, soloist: Hemma Tuppy, conductor: U.-D. Soyka)
- Cello concerto (premiered by Mark Varshavsky)
- Horn concerto (for James Lowe, Birmingham 2004)
- Symphonies (the first premiered 2006 in Bulgaria, conductor: Grigor Palikarov; the second premiered 2014 in Vienna, conductor: Thomas Payne)
- Masses, Oratories (e.g. Requiem with Consolation, Pfingst-Oratory and others)
- Choir works
- Song cycles
- Chamber music
- Micro-tonal chamber music (SIMC-Konzert with H.-A. Stamm's enharmonic micro-tonal Organ etc.)

== List of works ==
Soykas work list includes the following work groups:

- op. 1 Masses, oratorios, religious music;
- op. 2 Chamber music for smaller ensembles;
- op. 3 larger chamber ensembles;
- op. 4 String/Chamber orchestra;
- op. 5 Instrumental concertos;
- op. 6 Song;
- op. 7 Film, Dance, Entertainment music and Audio art;
- op. 8 School music;
- op. 9 Keyboard instruments solo;
- op. 10 Orchestra;
- op. 11 Choir;
- op. 12: Operas;

== Conductors activities ==
Ulf-Diether Soyka prefers conducting his own works. He has conducted at

- Konzerthaus Vienna (R.Strauss, Pro Arte-Orchester)
- ORF-Hall Vienna (J.N.David, Pro Arte-Orchester)
- Großer Musikvereinssaal Vienna (Goldener Saal) (U.-D.Soyka, 2. Saxophone Concerto Nr. 2, premiere with the NÖ.Tonkünstlerorchester)
- Austrian Music Days in Bulgaria 2001 - 2003 (Suite for String orchestra, premiere with the Opera Philharmonic Orchestra Plovdiv)
- Repertoire: W.A.Mozart, J.Haydn, L.van Beethoven, F.Schubert, J.Brahms …
- World premieres of works of composers who had to leave Germany in 1938.

== Education ==
Soyka completed his diploma studies with Friedrich Cerha (composition) and Otmar Suitner (orchestral conducting) as well as the teaching profession for musical education at the University for Music and Performing Arts in Vienna.

== Awards ==
- 1975 and 1977 scholar of the Alban Berg Foundation
- 1980 and 1987 Theodor-Körner-Composition award
- 1981 scholar of City of Vienna for composition
- 1983 Austrian State grant for composition
- 1983 Support prize for music in Lower Austria
- 1985 Culture prize in Klosterneuburg
- 1985 Composer's prize in Tolima/Columbia
- 2002 Composer's prize for choir music to texts from Wilhelm Busch
- 2008 AICE culture composer's prize for choir music

== Functions in the music life ==
1979–1981 teaching representatives at the University for Music and Dramatical Art in Vienna, 1982–1983 high school-teacher, 1983 Austrian state scholar for composition. He then worked as a freelance composer and occasional conductor. Soyka wrote numerous commissioned compositions within the next years, and since 2000 he has been working as an assistant professor of Music Theory and Composition at the Prayner Conservatory in Vienna.

Further long-term functions: High school teacher, leader of a church choir, member of the executive board in the Austrian composer federation, subject lectures at English and Australian Music-Universities, music journalism for many cultural journals (Ö.Musikzeitschrift u.a.), management of music symposia, functions in AKM, ÖGZM, music labour union etc., expert of the Viennese summer seminars for new music, founder and manager of an ensemble for new music, coordination of the "Pro-Arte-Orchestra", founder and concert organiser of "Project First Performances", lecturer at the intercultural Ekmelik Symposium Salzburg 1986, and much more.

== Family ==
Soyka has three grown sons.
