= Erik Freitag =

Austrian classical composer and violinist

- Born: February 1, 1940 (age 86); Vienna, Austria
- Education: University of Music and Performing Arts Vienna; Royal Swedish Academy of Music
- Occupation: Composer
- Years active: 1964–present

Erik Freitag (born 1 February 1940) is an Austrian composer and violinist.

== Life ==
Born in Vienna, Freitag studied violin at the University of Music and Performing Arts Vienna, with, among others, Eduard Melkus and composition with Karl-Birger Blomdahl at the Royal Swedish Academy of Music.

From 1964 to 1967, he was violinist in the Sveriges Radio Symfoniorchester and from 1967 to 1970 in the Stockholms Filharmoniska Orchester. He then directed the Vienna-Ottakring Music School until 2003. In 1987, together with Eugene Hartzell and René Staar, he founded the "Ensemble Wiener Collage", which is dedicated to the interpretation of contemporary works, especially by Austrian composers.

== Awards ==
- 1975: Förderungspreis des Bundesministeriums für Unterricht und Kunst
- 1979: Förderungspreis der Stadt Wien
- 1988: Theodor Körner Prize
- 1996: Composer in Residence der Northwestern University of Michigan

== Work ==
- Hymnus – cantata for speaker, tenor, mixed choir, alto flute, harp, vibraphone and violin, 1970
- Kleine Suite für Streicher und Klavier, 1972
- Moving Studies – Szenen für Tänzer, 1973
- Drei Stücke für Streichquartett, 1976
- Drei Miniaturen für Klavier zu vier Händen, 1977
- Divertimento für Bläserquintett, 1977
- Transformationen – für Violine und Klavier nach der lettischen Weise "Araji, ecetaji", 1978
- Suite für Orchester – aus ‘Moving Studies’, 1978
- Limericks – (5 songs for mezzo and 6 instruments), 1978
- Zwei Sätze für Streicher, 1980
- Sonate (Nachtstücke) für Violine und Viola, 1980
- Suite für die Jugend for Orchestra, 1981
- Elegie und Tanz für Oboe und Streichquartett, 1981
- Ouverture danoise for Orchestra, 1982
- El retablo de la catedral de Tarragona, 1982, 1992, 2000
- Quasi una marcia for chamber orchestra, 1983
- Strindberg – Licht und Schatten – (ljus och skugga), 1985, 2008
- Linee per violino solo, 1985
- Drei Stücke für Klavier, 1985
- Hommage à un grand artiste, 1986
- Triade, 1987
- Passages in the wind – (baritone and 7 instruments), 1987
- Konzert für Violine und Orchester, 1998
- Seis canciones castellanas, 1989
- Quintett 1989
- Zwölf Duos für zwei Violinen, 1990
- Sonate für Violoncello und Klavier, 1990
- Reflections in air für Streichtrio, 1990
- Helle Nacht für Streichorchester, 1990
- Augenblick eines Fauns für Altflöte, 1990
- Nocturne, 1992
- Idun, 1992
- Yotziguanazí – Tres leyendas centroamericanas, 1994
- Triaphonie I, 1995
- Soul-Sky – after the poem by John Gracen Brown, 1995
- Immagini, 1995
- Circuits Magiques – pour quatuor à cordes, 1996
- Triaphonie II, 1997
- Triaphonie III, 1998
- in der todesstunde von alfons alfred schmidt, Stage play for singers, speaker and 7 instrumentalists, 1998
- Quintett 2000
- 6 Lieder für mittlere Stimme und Schlagzeug, 2000
- Triaphonie IV, 2001
- Canciones Espanolas Antiguas, 2001
- Concerto da Camera for chamber orchestra, 2002
- Pablos Galerie, 2004
- Marsyas&Apollo, 2004
- En svensk jullegend (A Swedish Christmas legend), 2005
- Triaphonie V – Omar Khayyam, 2006
- Concertino für Marimba und Streicher, 2006
