= Franz Thürauer =

Austrian composer

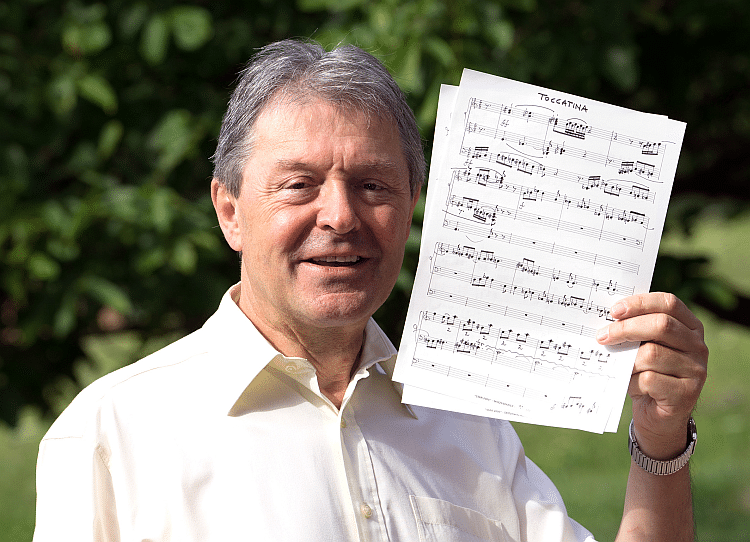
Franz Thürauer in 2018 holding the score of his Toccatina

Franz Thürauer (born 25 September 1953) is an Austrian composer, music educator and church musician.

== Life ==
Born in Wolfenreith Nr. 9, Bergern im Dunkelsteinerwald community, Thürauer grew up in a family where folk music was cultivated. He received early lessons in clarinet and piano. From 1969 to 1972, he was educated in organ and violin at the Tyrolean State Conservatory in Innsbruck. After passing the Matura at the grammar school in St. Karls/Volders in 1972, he went to the Academy of Music and Performing Arts in Vienna, where he studied church music with Anton Heiller and Hans Gillesberger, as well as composition with Francis Burt and Kurt Schwertsik.

With the 1978/79 school year, Thürauer began his career as a music teacher at the St. Pölten Music School, where he was employed as a piano teacher. From 1 September 1979, he was also appointed as a music teacher at the Stiftsgymnasium Melk, where he was the teacher of Otto Lechner, Thomas Foramitti and Manfred Regall, among others. As a composer, this gave him the opportunity to compose or create appropriate musical works for his students and their choice of musical instruments. In 1984, he was appointed "Regens Chori" of Melk Abbey and dedicated himself to church music as organist and choirmaster. Thürauer received commissions to compose for the "Melker Pfingstkonzerte", where, among others, the Concertino Kolomani was performed on 21 March 1983 in the Kolomani Hall of the monastery with Elisabeth Ullmann (organ), Bijan Khadem-Missagh (conductor and violin) and the "Tonkünstler Kammerorchester Wien". In 1991/92, he also received a teaching assignment for ear training and solfeggio at the Musikhochschule in Vienna. His works have been performed in Vienna (Musikverein, Konzerthaus, ORF-Sendesaal, Wiener Musiksommer), as well as at the Bregenz Festival, Lower Austria Donaufestival, Brucknerhaus Linz, in Japan and in America. Performers have included the Vienna Chamber Orchestra, the Vienna Saxophone Quartet, Ensemble Kontrapunkte, the Lower Austrian Tonkünstler Orchestra, the Vienna Virtuosi, the Vienna Youth Orchestra, the Stadttheater St. Pölten, the Vienna Symphony Orchestra and many others.

Thürauer lives in Kochholz/Lower Austria, is married and father of four children. On 31 August 2012, he ended his teaching activities at the Stiftsgymnasium Melk, but he continues to be active as a music school teacher at the Musikschule St. Pölten.

== Prizes and awards ==
- 1982: Theodor Körner Prize
- 1990: Österreichischer Förderungspreis für Musik.
- 2015: Niederösterreichischer Kulturpreis – Würdigungspreis.
