= Karl Etti =

Austrian composer

- Born: 26 October 1912; Vienna, Austria-Hungary
- Died: 15 April 1996 (aged 83); Mödling, Austria
- Occupation: Composer

Karl Etti (26 October 1912 – 15 April 1996) was an Austrian composer. His work was part of the music event in the art competition at the 1936 Summer Olympics.
