= Neue Oper Wien =

Austrian opera company

Neue Oper Wien is an Austrian opera company based in Vienna. Insight Guides cites them and the Wiener Taschenoper as "two of the independent groups which perform exclusively 20th and 21st-century opera".

== Operas performed, 1992–2014 ==
- 1992: Musiktheater-Keimzellen (World premiere)
- 1994: Axel Seidelmann: Hiob (World premiere)
- 1995: Reinhard Süss/Oskar Kokoschka: Sphinx und Strohmann (World premiere)
- 1995: Kurt Weill: Der Silbersee
- 1996: Benjamin Britten: Billy Budd and Mark-Anthony Turnage: Greek
- 1997: Max Brand: Maschinist Hopkins
- 1999: Tan Dun: Marco Polo
- 2000: Dirk D'Ase: Arrest (World premiere)
- 2000: Leonard Bernstein: Candide
- 2002: Kurt Weill: Johnny Johnson
- 2003: Helmut Lachenmann: Das Mädchen mit den Schwefelhölzern
- 2003: Wolfram Wagner/Peter Turrini: Endlich Schluss (World premiere)
- 2004: Christoph Coburger nach Daniil Charms: Zwischenfälle (World premiere)
- 2004: John Casken: God’s Liar
- 2005: Péter Eötvös: Le Balcon // Michael Tippett: The Knot Garden
- 2005: Christoph Cech – Claudio Monteverdi: Orfeo (World premiere)
- 2006: Richard Dünser/Thomas Höft: Radek (World premiere)
- 2006: Erik Hojsgaard nach Ödön von Horváth: Don Juan kommt aus dem Krieg (World premiere)
- 2006: Dieter Kaufmann nach Josef Winkler: Requiem für Piccoletto (World premiere)
- 2006: Thomas Pernes/Gloria G.: Zauberflöte06 (World premiere)
- 2007: Tan Dun: Tea
- 2008: Elliott Carter: What next? // Detlev Glanert: Scherz, Satire, Ironie und tiefere Bedeutung
- 2008: Isidora Zebeljan: Eine Marathon-Familie (World premiere)
- 2008: Dieter Kaufmann/Elfriede Jelinek: FUGE – UNFUG – E (World premiere)
- 2009: Harrison Birtwistle: The Last Supper
- 2010: Herwig Reiter/Peter Turrini: Campiello (World premiere)
- 2012: Markus Lehmann-Horn / Michael Schneider: Woyzeck 2.0 – Traumfalle (World premiere)
- 2013: Šimon Voseček: Biedermann und die Brandstifter (World premiere)
- 2013: Péter Eötvös: "Paradise reloaded (Lilith)" (World premiere)
- 2014: Harrison Birtwistle: Punch and Judy
- 2014: Manfred Trojahn: Orest
