= Praeludium (Waterhouse) =

Piece for piano by Graham Waterhouse

- Piano piece by Graham Waterhouse
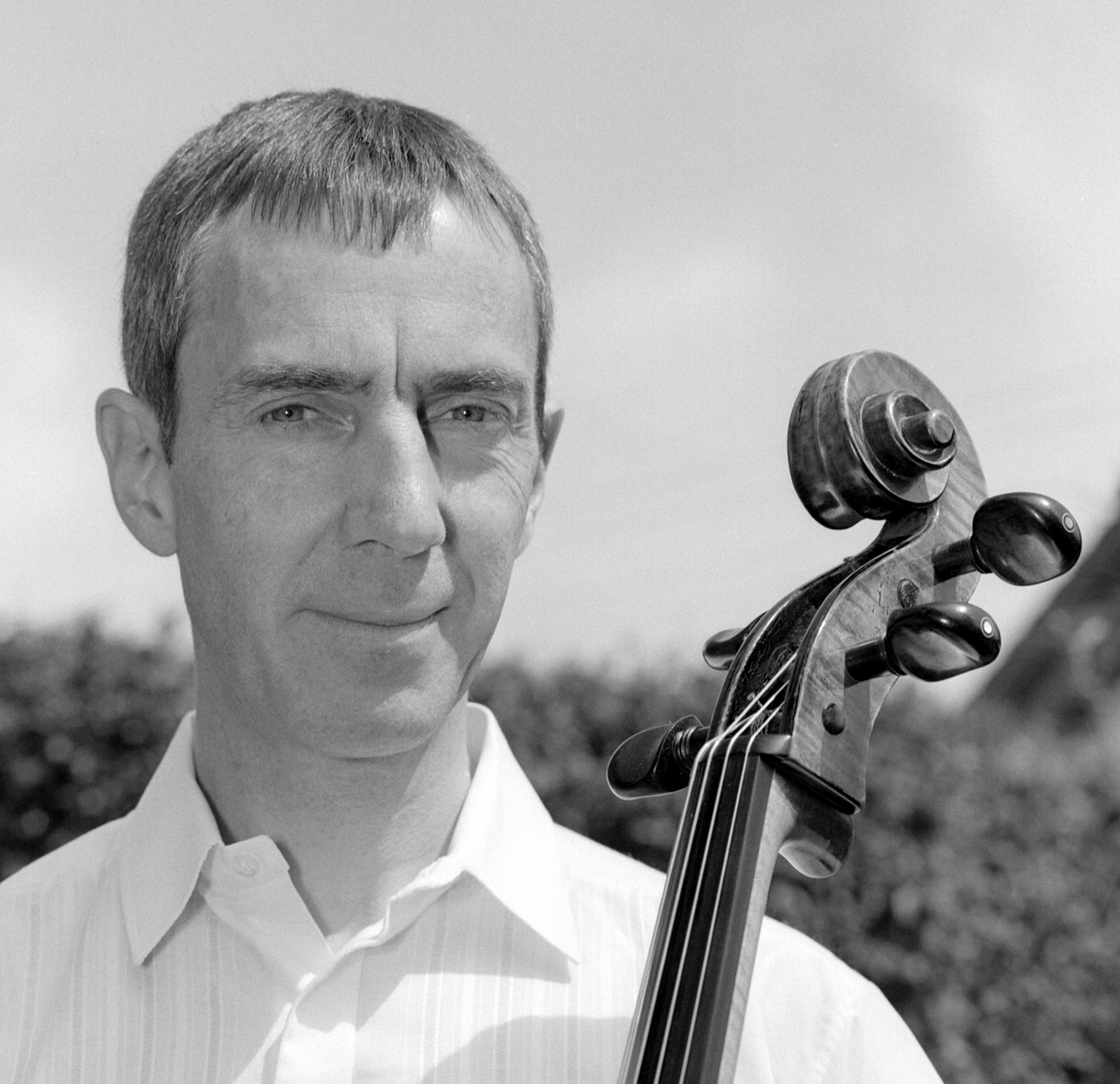
- The composer in 2011
- Opus: 32
- Composed: 1992
- Performed: 1993: London
- Published: 2002

Praeludium (Prelude), Op. 32, is a piece for piano by Graham Waterhouse, composed in 1992 and published by Lienau in 2002. The virtuoso composition has been played in concert internationally, and was recorded.

== History ==
Waterhouse composed the piano piece in 1992. It premiered in London in 1993. Praeludium was published by Lienau in 2002.

== Music ==
Praeludium is written in one movement, in common time, marked Allegro agitato. A rhythmic-chromatic theme is contrasted by a lyrical one, culminating in a virtuoso coda. The duration is given as six minutes. A 2005 review in Neue Musikzeitung, comparing newly published music for pianists, described the piece as "a dramatic concert piece with gushing figurations, lyrical insertions, polyphonic elements, harmonic refinement and a purposefully intensified enormous conclusion" ("... dramatisches Konzertstück mit sprudelnden Figurationen, lyrischen Einschüben, polyphonen Elementen, harmonischen Raffinessen und einem zielstrebig gesteigerten, enormen Schluss").

== Recording and performance ==
The cover of the published music of Praeludium shows the composer's signature. It was included in overviews of his work on CD and concert. It was recorded in 2001 as the first piece of Portrait, a selection of the composer's chamber music by Cybele Records, played by Michael Wendeberg. The CD also includes compositions such as Three Pieces for Solo Cello and the trio Gestural Variations. Reviewer Hubert Culot described it as brilliant and virtuoso.

Christopher White played the piece to open a composer portrait concert at the Gasteig in Munich on 11 April 2010. The program also featured vocal music including the premiere of Im Gebirg, a song setting a poem by Hans Krieger, and a selection from Piano Album. The piece was part of programs on the occasion of the composer's 50th birthday in London, Munich and Frankfurt, featuring performances of chamber music by members of the Munich Philharmonic. A review in the Süddeutsche Zeitung of the concert at the Gasteig on 4 November 2012 was titled "Hochexpressiv" (Highly expressive). Reinhard Palmer wrote in the magazine Neue Musikzeitung, that Valentina Babor played Praeludium with bracchial thunder. The piece notably opened GW60, a concert on 5 November 2022 at the Allerheiligen-Hofkirche in Munich to celebrate the composer's 60th birthday. it was performed by Nuron Mukumi.
