= String quartets (Waterhouse) =

- by Graham Waterhouse
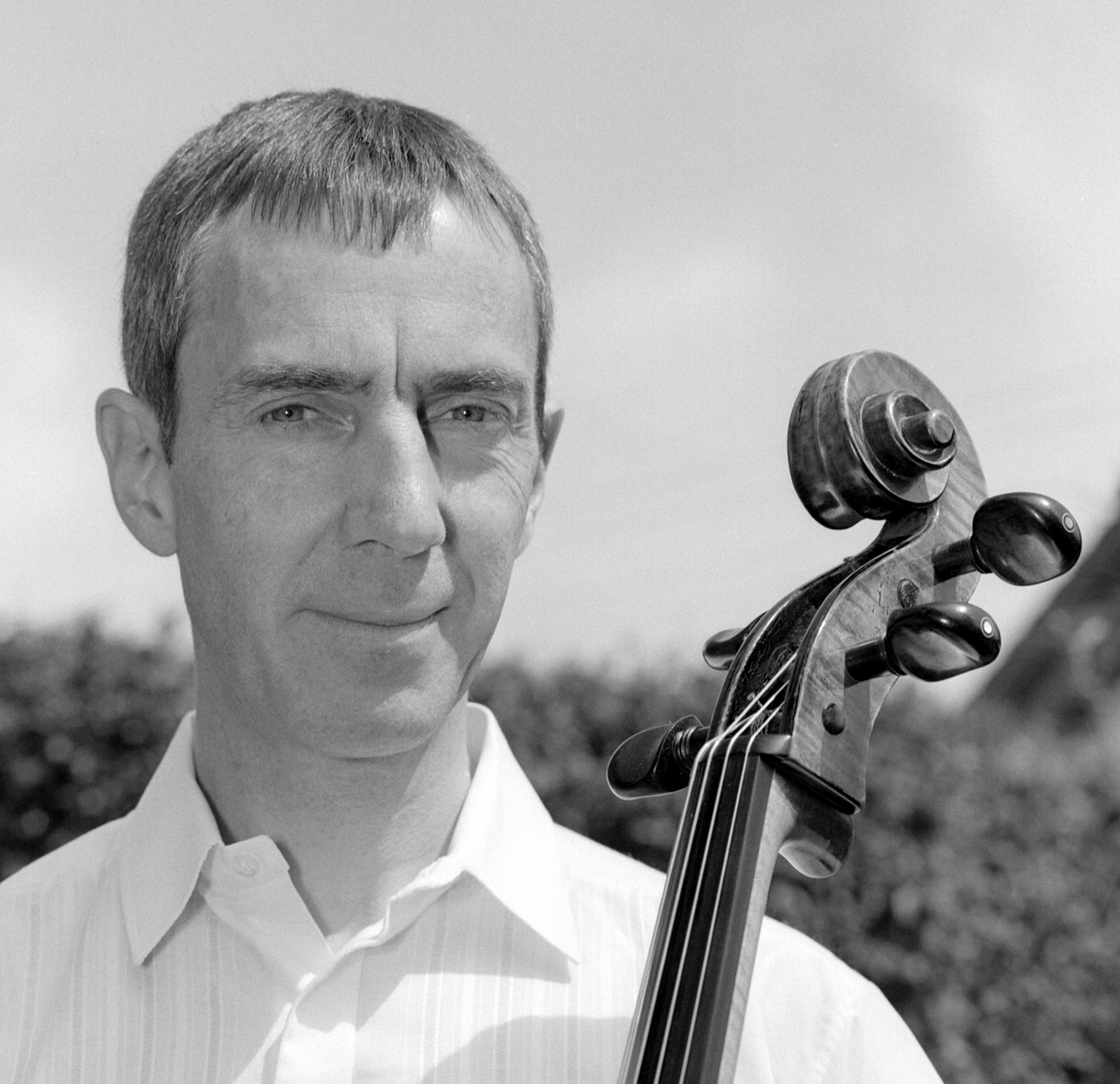
- Composer Graham Waterhouse, 2011
- Period: contemporary

Graham Waterhouse, cellist and composer especially of chamber music, has written a number of works for string quartet, three major works in several movements, several smaller works and compositions for a solo instrument (piccolo, oboe, bassoon, piano) and string quartet.

== Overview ==
As a cellist and composer, Waterhouse focuses on chamber music and has composed works for strings from solo cello to string sextet. Several works were written for string quartet, some using it juxtaposed to a solo instrument.

Works for string quartet

- String Quartet in G (1975)
- Hungarian Polyphony (1986)
- String Quartet (2002)
- Opus J (2005)
- Chinese Whispers, premiered in Preston 2010
- Prophetiae Sibyllarum, premiered in Munich in 2012
- Stone Circle (2013)
- Alcatraz, premiered in Berg in 2014
- Crystallogenesis, premiered in Berg in 2016

Works for solo instrument and string quartet

- Piccolo Quintet (1989)
- Intermezzo, for oboe and string quartet, premiered in Idstein in 2000
- Bassoon Quintet, premiered in Munich in 2003, revised 2011
- Rhapsodie Macabre for piano and string quartet, premiered in Munich in 2011
- Trilogy for piano and string quartet, premiered in 2013

Four of the works were performed in a concert at the Gasteig on 4 November 2012, celebrating the composer's 50th birthday, played by him with members of the Münchner Philharmoniker: Hungarian Polyphony, Bassoon Quintet, Piccolo Quintet and Rhapsodie Macabre.

== Works ==
=== Hungarian Polyphony ===
Hungarian Polyphony
- Opus: 25
- Performed: 1988
- Published: 1996
- Duration: 7 minutes
- Movements: 1
- Scoring: string quartet

Hungarian Polyphony, Op. 25, is a work in one movement, begun in 1984 as a trio for two violins and cello, revised in 1986 for string quartet. The Hungarian elements are Gypsy scales and Hungarian rhythms. Sergiu Celibidache suggested more revisions and arranged that it was to be performed at the 1988 Schleswig-Holstein Musik Festival by members of the festival orchestra. The work was published by Hofmeister in Leipzig in 1996. It takes about 7 minutes to perform.

=== Chinese Whispers ===
Chinese Whispers in three movements was composed in 2010, combining elements from the music of China with composition techniques of Western classical music. The work was awarded the "BCMS Composition Prize" of the Birmingham Chamber Music Society in 2011.

=== Prophetiae Sibyllarum ===
Prophetiae Sibyllarum
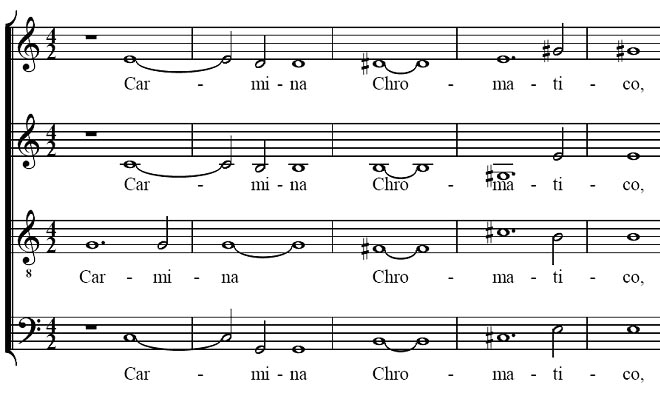
- Beginning of the motet by De Lassus which appears as movement three
- Based on: Motet by Orlande de Lassus
- Performed: 22 April 2012
- Movements: 4
- Scoring: string quartet

Prophetiae Sibyllarum (The Prophecies of the Sibyls) is a string quartet in four movements, first performed at the Gasteig in Munich on 22 April 2012. The title is taken from a cycle of motets by Orlande de Lassus. The first motet of the cycle of the same name appears as the third movement and is the basis for the music.

1. Moderato e risoluto
2. Scherzo e Trio – Presto con vehemenza – meno mosso
3. Motet (Lassus) – Adagio
4. Vivace

=== Alcatraz ===
Alcatraz
- Performed: 11 November 2014
- Movements: 4

Alcatraz is a string quartet, inspired by Alcatraz Island. It was first performed on 11 November 2014 at Schloss Kempfenhausen in Berg, in a program of contemporary string quartets played by the Pelaar Quartet with the composer as the cellist. It was published by Klangmueller Musikverlag.

1. The Rock - Adagio - Moderato e risoluto
2. Solitary - Scherzo, Agitato ma non troppo allegro
3. Sioux - Andante lamentoso
4. Testimony - Allegremente, precipitando

=== Crystallogenesis ===
Crystallogenesis
- Performed: 1 July 2016
- Movements: 2

Crystallogenesis is in two movements, a slow and a fast one. It was inspired by the proliferation of crystals. It was first performed on 1 July 2016 at Schloss Kempfenhausen in Berg, played by the Pelaar Quartet with the composer as the cellist.

=== Alchymic Quartet ===
Alchymic Quartet is a string quartet in four movements composed in 2022. It was inspired by chemical experiments that the composer remembered from being a student at Highgate School with teacher Andrew Szydlo. It was first performed at concerts celebrating the composer's 60th birthday in November 2022, with Szydlo present. In one concert he conducted experiments at the same time. The music was played by the Philharmonisches Quartett München.
