= Graham Waterhouse =

English composer (born 1962)

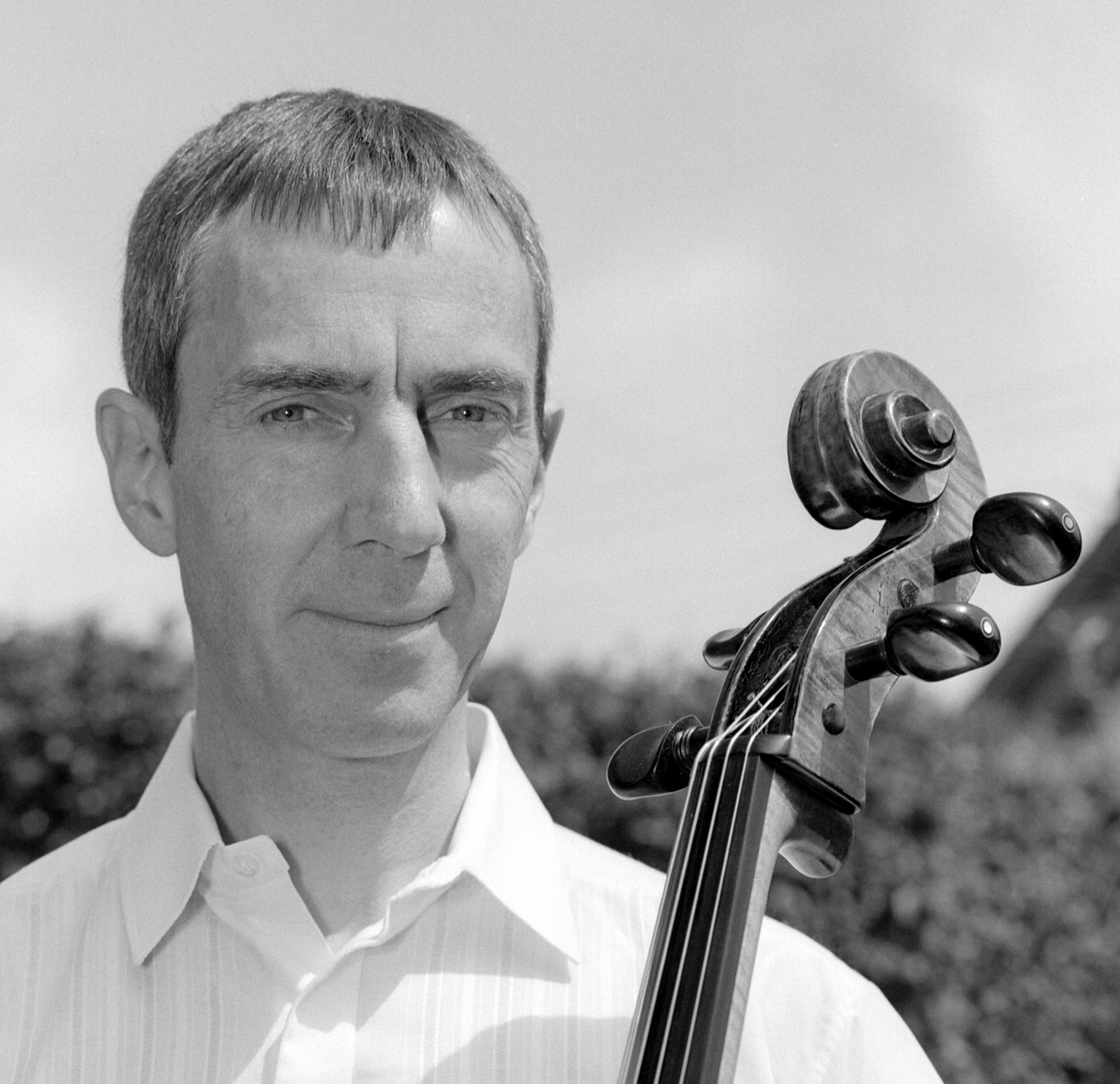
- Portrait, 2011
- Born: 2 November 1962 (age 63); London, England
- Education: Highgate School; Cambridge University; Folkwang Hochschule; Hochschule für Musik Köln; University of Birmingham
- Occupations: Composer of chamber music; Cellist
- Years active: 1978–present
- Works: List of compositions
- Parents: William Waterhouse (father); Elisabeth Waterhouse (mother)
- Waterhouse's voice recorded March 2015
- Website: Official website

Graham Waterhouse (born 2 November 1962) is an English composer and cellist who specializes in chamber music. He has composed a cello concerto, Three Pieces for Solo Cello and Variations for Cello Solo for his own instrument, and string quartets and compositions that juxtapose a quartet with a solo instrument, including Piccolo Quintet, Bassoon Quintet and the piano quintet Rhapsodie Macabre. He has set poetry for speaking voice and cello, such as Der Handschuh, and has written song cycles. His compositions reflect the individual capacity and character of players and instruments, from the piccolo to the contrabassoon.

Since 1998, Waterhouse has organised a concert series at the Gasteig in Munich, often playing with members of the Munich Philharmonic. His works have been performed internationally and several have been recorded. He has been awarded prizes for several of his compositions, and has been composer in residence at institutions in European countries. He achieved a PhD from the University of Birmingham in 2018. From 2020, his compositions have been published by Schott.

== Career ==
Graham Waterhouse was born in London, the son of the noted bassoonist and musicologist William Waterhouse and the pianist and music teacher Elisabeth Waterhouse. Graham attended Highgate School and studied music at the University of Cambridge (composition with Hugh Wood and Robin Holloway), and in Germany at the Folkwang Hochschule (cello with Young-Chang Cho) and Hochschule für Musik Köln (cello, with Maria Kliegel, conducting and piano). He has lived in Munich since 1992.

He has received commissions by the International Double Reed Society (IDRS), the Orchestre de Chambre de Lausanne, Munich Biennale, Schleswig-Holstein Musik Festival, Orquesta Sinfónica Nacional del Estado de Mexico, the Kaske Stiftung and the Park Lane Group (London), among others. His compositions have earned prizes at competitions of Münchener Tonkünstlerverband (1996) and of Via Nova in Weimar (2000). His string quartet Chinese Whispers was awarded the "BCMS Composition Prize" of the Birmingham Chamber Music Society in 2011.

He has performed as the soloist of his Cello Concerto in Mexico City (1995), Nizhny Novgorod, Weimar, Baden-Baden, St. Martin, Idstein (version for chamber orchestra, 2005), Cambridge (2008), and on 8 July 2016 once more in Nizhny Nowgorod, with the Academic Symphony Orchestra conducted by Alexander Skulsky.

In 2001, Waterhouse was the composer in residence of Solisten der Kammerphilharmonie Berlin, in 2006 artiste en residence in Albertville, France, and in 2008 Musician By-Fellow at Churchill College, University of Cambridge.

He has worked with Ensemble Modern and participated in the concert tour 2001 of the Ensemble Modern Orchestra under Pierre Boulez. He has also performed with the ensembles musikFabrik and Kammerensemble Neue Musik Berlin, among others.

As a composer and a performer, he is mostly dedicated to chamber music, and has co-founded several chamber ensembles, including the Vuillaume-Cello-Ensemble playing instruments built by Jean-Baptiste Vuillaume. He established in 1998 a regular chamber music concert series at Gasteig Munich, programming contemporary works alongside classical repertory. Players for his chamber music concerts have included members of the Munich Philharmonic, such as bassoonist Lyndon Watts. Waterhouse has collaborated with the composers Jens Josef (flute) and Rudi Spring (piano). They appeared together in a trio concert at the Gasteig, performing Martinů's trio, the premiere of the flute version of Gestural Variations, and a Christmas carol by each composer, In dulci jubilo set by Waterhouse. The song Im Gebirg (The Mountain) on a poem of Hans Krieger for mezzo-soprano, alto flute, cello and piano, was premiered at the Gasteig in 2010 by Martina Koppelstetter, Jens Josef, the composer and Christopher White. In a concert The Proud Bassoon in Wigmore Hall, celebrating his father on 16 April 2011, he performed as a cellist, and two works he had written in memory of his father, Epitaphium and Bright Angel, received their premiere in the UK. In a concert concluding the Gasteig's Liszt Festival to honour the 200th birthday of Franz Liszt, his chamber music scored for piano solo up to piano and string quartet appeared in the context of pieces in similar settings by Liszt. In 2011, he composed a Christmas cantata on a text by Krieger. In 2013 his piano trio Bells of Beyond was premiered at the Gasteig with Yury Revich and Valentina Babor. Incantations, a Concerto da camera for piano and ensemble, was premiered and recorded in Birmingham on 26 March 2015 at the CBSO Centre with Huw Watkins, piano, and the Birmingham Contemporary Music Group, conducted by Richard Baker.

Waterhouse's compositions reflect the individual capacity and character of players and instruments from piccolo to contrabassoon, even unusual ones such as the heckelphone or didgeridoo. He scored Chieftain's Salute for Great Highland Bagpipe and string orchestra, Hale Bopp, inspired by comet Hale–Bopp, for string orchestra with boy soprano. He also wrote several compositions for cello and speaking voice, based on literature as diverse as limerick (Vezza), ballad (Der Handschuh) and drama (Das Hexen-Einmaleins), which he plays and recites himself. He has lectured on contemporary music at the yearly Komponisten-Colloquium of the University of Oldenburg, initiated by Violeta Dinescu. Several of his pieces have been composed for the competition Jugend musiziert and performed at the prize winners' concerts.

The first publisher of his works was the Friedrich Hofmeister Musikverlag, beginning with Aztec Ceremonies and Three Pieces for Solo Cello in 1996. His music appeared also with Zimmermann and Robert Lienau in Frankfurt, Heinrichshofen Verlag in Wilhelmshaven. His set of pedagogical pieces for cello, Thomas Tunes, was published in 2017 by Breitkopf & Haertel. From 2020, his works have been published by Schott, beginning with Concentricities for ensemble and Variations for Cello Solo.

His music has been recorded, notably on Portrait (2001) with works for piano, clarinet and cello, and Portrait 2 (2004) with music for string orchestra, played by the English Chamber Orchestra, and for wind ensemble, played by Endymion.

In 2018, he achieved a Ph.D. from the University of Birmingham, with a thesis Incantations / Concerto da Camera for Piano and Ensemble (2015) / The balance of traditional and progressive musical parameters through the concertante treatment of the piano.

== Performances and reviews ==
Waterhouse's 50th birthday was celebrated with concerts dedicated to his works in London, Munich and Frankfurt, featuring performances of chamber music by members of the Munich Philharmonic. Peter Grahame Woolf wrote about the Graham Waterhouse Portrait Concert at Highgate School on 9 October 2012, focussing on the string quartet Prophetiae Sibyllarum and Rhapsodie Macabre. A review in the Süddeutsche Zeitung of the concert at the Gasteig on 4 November 2012 was titled "Hochexpressiv" (Highly expressive) and covered additionally Praeludium, Bassoon Quintet and Piccolo Quintet. Reinhard Palmer wrote in the magazine Neue Musikzeitung about the concert in Munich, under the title "Beliebter Außenseiter" (Popular outsider), comparing the quintets to concertos, noting the influence of Karol Szymanowski and Witold Lutoslawski and the qualities of musical story-telling. The broadcaster Hessischer Rundfunk aired an interview on his birthday.

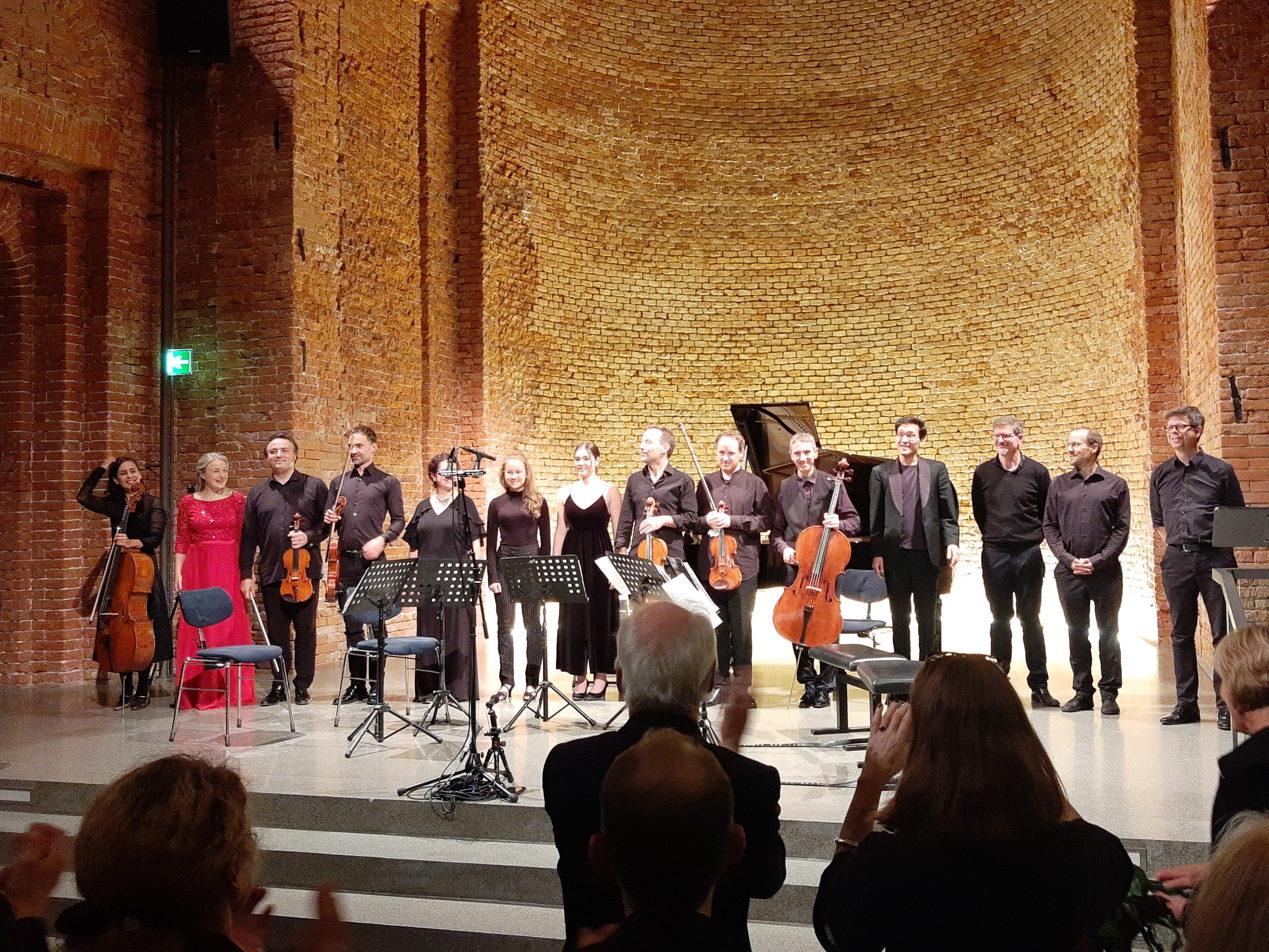
Final bow by all players after GW60 concert, Szydlo standing in the audience

On the occasion of his 60th birthday, a concert GW60 was given with colleagues and friends at the Allerheiligen-Hofkirche of the Munich Residence on 5 November 2022. His school chemistry teacher, Andrew Z. Szydlo, with whom he had played chamber music, held a laudation, and his chemical experiments inspired a new string quartet, Alchymic Quartet. The program of chamber music from five decades of composing included the piano quartet Skylla und Charybdis (2011), the new quartet, the clarinet-cello-piano trio Concentricities (2019), and the String Sextet op. 1, spanning composition time from 1979 to 2013. Among the 14 musicians were violinist David Frühwirth, violist Konstantin Sellheim, and pianist Katharina Sellheim.

== Compositions ==
- Variations on a Theme of Pachelbel for organ (1981)
- Scherzino for piano, published 2006 in Piano Album (1984)
- Hungarian Polyphony for string quartet (1986)
- Piccolo Quintet (1989)
- Cello Concerto (1990)
- Mouvements d'Harmonie for wind ensemble (1991), dedicated to William Waterhouse
- Nonet for wind quintet, string trio and double bass (1991)
- Praeludium for piano (1992)
- Four Epigraphs after Escher for heckelphone, viola and piano – after drawings by M. C. Escher (1993)
- Celtic Voices and Hale Bopp for string orchestra with obbligato treble voice (1993)
- Vezza, Limerick for cello and speaking voice (1993), Whether the weather be hot – as a German would pronounce it
- Aztec Ceremonies for contrabassoon and piano, premiered IDRS 1995, Rotterdam
- Three Pieces for Solo Cello (1996), dedicated to Siegfried Palm
- Ode to an Australian Forebear for flute, marimba, cello and didgeridoo (1997)
- Gestural Variations for oboe, bassoon and piano (1997), prize-winner at Via Nova in Weimar (2000)
- Kreuzverhör for flute, oboe and string trio, premiered at the Munich Biennale 1998
- Diplo-Diversions for bassoon and piano, premiered at the IDRS Congress 1998
- Hexenreigen for bassoon quartet (1998)
- Hymnus for wind ensemble (1998)
- Bei Nacht (At Night) for piano trio (1999), inspired by a painting of Kandinsky, Nacht
- Chieftain's Salute for Great Highland Bagpipe and string orchestra (2001)
- Sinfonietta for string orchestra (2002)
- Threnody for cello solo (2002), published as Music against Terrorism and Violence
- Bassoon Quintet, premiered in Munich 2003, revised 2011
- Sicilian Air for flute and piano (2003)
- Sechs späteste Lieder after Hölderlin for mezzo-soprano and cello (2003)
- Der Handschuh (The Glove), the ballad by Friedrich Schiller, for cello and speaking voice (2005)
- Das Hexen-Einmaleins (The Witches' One-Times-One), after Goethe (Faust Part One, Witch's Kitchen), for cello and speaking voice (2007)
- Bright Angel for three bassoons and contrabassoon, premiered IDRS 2008, Provo, Utah, referring to the Bright Angel Trail
- Phoenix Arising / Tribute to William Waterhouse, for bassoon and piano, premiered in London 2009
- Epitaphium In Memoriam W.R.W. for string trio, premiered in Munich 2009
- Chinese Whispers for string quartet, premiered in Preston 2010
- Der Werwolf and The Banshee on a poem of Christian Morgenstern for speaking voice and cello (2010)
- Zeichenstaub for string trio, premiered in Arnstadt 2010
- Rhapsodie Macabre for piano and string quartet, premiered in Munich 2011
- Der Anfang einer neuen Zeit (The Beginning of a New Time), Christmas cantata on a text by Hans Krieger, premiered in Essen 2011
- Prophetiae Sibyllarum for string quartet, premiered in Munich 2012
- Sonata ebraica for viola and piano (2012–2013), premiered in Munich 2013
- Bells of Beyond, piano trio, premiered in Munich 2013
- Alcatraz, string quartet, premiered in Munich 2014
- String Sextet, Op. 1, premiered in Munich 2014
- Carpe diem, cantata for soloists, choir and orchestra, premiered in Munich 2014
- Skylla and Charybdis, piano quartet, premiered in Munich 2014
- Incantations, Concerto da camera for piano and ensemble, premiered in Birmingham 2015
- Music of Sighs, song cycle after James Joyce for mezzo-soprano and ensemble, premiered in Munich 2016
- Crystallogenesis for string quartet, premiered in Berg 2016
- Concentricities for clarinet, cello and piano, premiered in Munich in 2019, published by Schott
- Variations for Cello Solo, premiered in Vienna 2020, published by Schott
- Eleven Smithereens (2021), premiered in Munich 2021
- Fantasia Ucraina for two violins, premiered in 2022, published by Schott
- Alchymic Quartet, string quartet, premiered in 2022 in Munich
- Birkenlicht, cello sonata, premiered in 2023 in Munich
- Perplexities after Escher, heckelphon and string quartete, premiered in 2024 in Garmisch-Partenkirchen

== Publications ==
- Incantations / Concerto da Camera for Piano and Ensemble / The balance of traditional and progressive musical parameters through the concertante treatment of the piano (2015) (dissertation) Birmingham City University, March 2018

== Discography ==
- 2001 Graham Waterhouse Portrait, chamber music, Cybele
- 2004 Graham Waterhouse Portrait 2, music for string orchestra and wind ensemble, Meridian Records
- 2020 Skylla und Charybdis, music for piano and strings, Farao Classics

Single works

- 2000 Bassoon With a View, Innova Recordings (Aztec Ceremonies)
- 2001 Benchmarks Vol. 6 – Folkestone and Hythe, Kent (Variations on a Theme by Pachelbel)
- 2007 concerto piccolo, Archiv Music (Piccolo Quintet)
