= Birkenlicht =

- Cello sonata by Graham Waterhouse
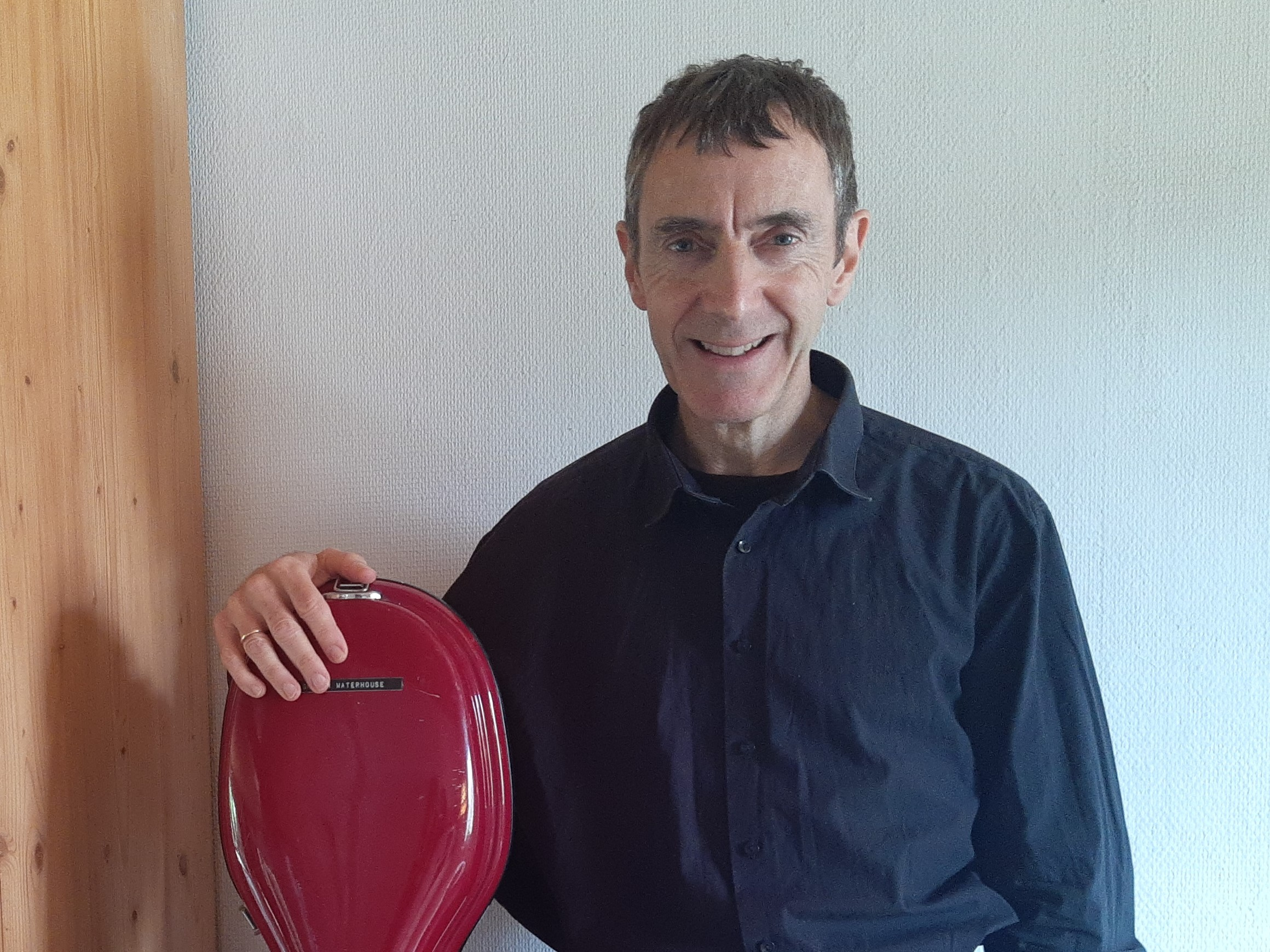
- Waterhouse in 2024
- Period: contemporary
- Dedication: In memoriam Hans Krieger
- Performed: 29 September 2023: Gasteig Munich

Birkenlicht (lit.: Birches' Light) is a cello sonata by Graham Waterhouse, composed in 2023 in memory of the poet Hans Krieger. It was premiered in Munich that year.

== History ==
Waterhouse had set several poems by Hans Krieger to music, such as "Im Gebirg" for mezzo-soprano, alto flute, cello and piano in 2010, and Krieger had written the text of Christmas cantata for him, Der Anfang einer neuen Zeit (The beginning of a new time). He composed the cello sonata in 2023, on a request from Krieger's family after the poet had died on 9 January 2023. The title of the sonata is also the title of a poetry collection by Krieger. His ninth poetry book, it was published in 2016 and illustrated by Christine Rieck-Sonntag. He introduced it in a public reading on 1 February 2016, where the original artwork was also shown. The music is inspired by four of his poems, which were recited at the first performance.

The sonata was premiered at the Gasteig in Munich on 29 September 2023, at Saal X of the HP8 location. The program was dedicated to works by Robert Schumann and Waterhouse and played by the composer and pianist Miku Nishimoto-Neubert in their series Entdeckungen (Discoveries).
