= Eleven Smithereens =

Composition for cello by Graham Waterhouse

- by Graham Waterhouse
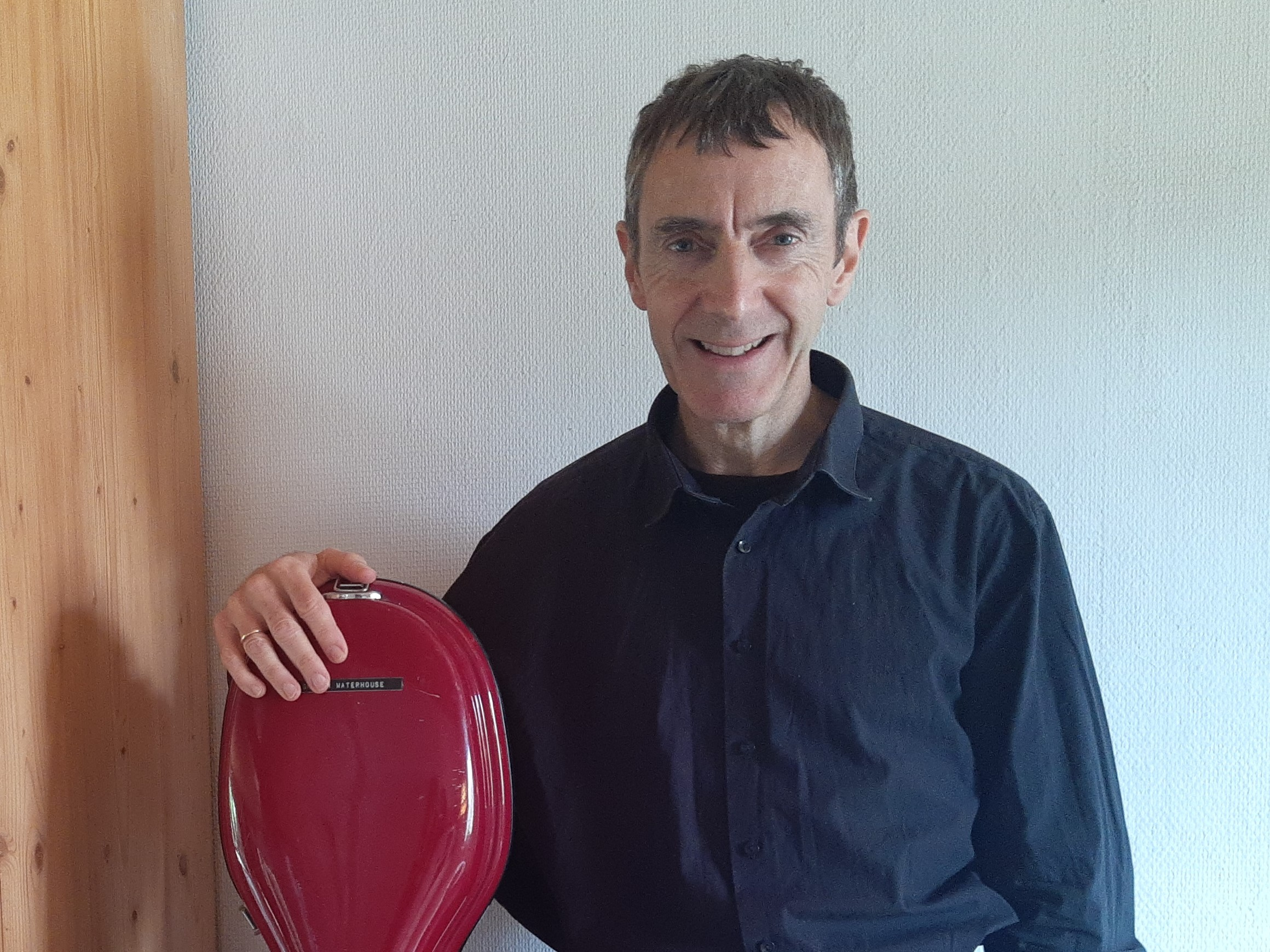
- Waterhouse in 2024
- Year: 2021
- Period: contemporary
- Movements: 11
- Scoring: cello

Eleven Smithereens is a composition for cello solo in eleven movements by Graham Waterhouse, completed in 2021. The composer wrote it during the COVID-19 lockdown to explore the possibilities of his instrument. He premiered the work, then just named Smithereens, at the Gasteig HP8 in Munich in 2021.

== History ==
Waterhouse, a cellist and composer, wrote Eleven Smithereens in early 2021 under the impression of the COVID-19 lockdown that gave him time to explore the sound qualities and techniques of his instrument. He premiered the work at the Gasteig HP8 in Munich, on 14 November 2021. He played it there again on 29 September 2023, together with the premiere of his Cello Sonata "Birkenlicht".

== Movements ==
The titles of the eleven movements were built by using the word Smithereens as a acrostic, providing the first letters of the movement titles forward and the last letters backward, and the rule that each title is one character longer than the previous one:

1. S
2. MN
3. IcE
4. TreE
5. HypeR
6. EveriE
7. RoguiH
8. ElephanT
9. EucalyptI
10. NightdreaM
11. SmithereenS

The duration is given as 25 minutes.
