= Chieftain's Salute =

Concerto by Graham Waterhouse

- Bagpipe concerto by Graham Waterhouse
- Opus: 34a
- Year: 2001; 2015
- Scoring: Bagpipe
- Instrumental: String orchestra (2001); Orchestra (2015)

Jacobean Salute
- by Graham Waterhouse
- Opus: 34
- Year: 1994
- Performed: 1995
- Scoring: Wind quintet (flute, oboe, clarinet, horn, bassoon); String quintet (2 violins, viola, cello, bass)

Chieftain's Salute is a concerto in one movement for Great Highland Bagpipe and orchestra by Graham Waterhouse. The work is one of few to use the bagpipe with a classical orchestra. A version for bagpipe and string orchestra, Op. 34a, was composed in 2001. It is based on an earlier work for bagpipe and string quartet. Jacobean Salute was also derived from the early work, with a wind quintet replacing the bagpipe, published in 2003. A version for bagpipe and orchestra was composed and first performed in 2015.

== Background and history ==
At Scottish Highland gatherings, a "Salute" is played to honour a person, here the "Chieftain" (the Head of a Clan). Waterhouse composed the first version of Chieftain's Salute in 1994 for bagpipe and string quartet, for a fund-raising event. He wrote a version for bagpipe and string orchestra, Op. 34a, in 2001. It was premiered and first recorded with soloist Graham Waller. In 2015 Waterhouse wrote a version for bagpipe and symphony orchestra. It was first performed on 8 November 2015 at the Capitol Theater in Offenbach am Main, again with Graham Waller as the soloist and the Neue Philharmonie Frankfurt conducted by Steven Lloyd González.

Waterhouse derived from the first work in 1994 also Jacobean Salute, a version without bagpipe, but scored for wind quintet (flute, oboe, clarinet, horn, bassoon), and string quintet (two violins, viola, cello and double bass), with the winds mainly playing the role of the bagpipe. Glissandi of the strings imitate the blowing of the pipes (Durchpusten der Pfeifen). It was premiered in 1995 and published in 2003 by Lienau in Frankfurt.

== Music ==
The opening theme is based on "Lady Doyle's Salute", a lament from the 17th century. The strings play alone for a while, the bagpipe enters, also first playing first, then both interact, with the strings at times imitating the drones of the bagpipe. Later passages are reminiscent of the old Scottish dances jig and reel, in variations with "increasing complex figurations".

== Performances and recording ==
Jacobean Salute was first performed in 1995, and notably played in a composer portrait concert at the Gasteig in Munich on 5 October 2003, along with the Piccolo Quintet, the premiere of the Bassoon Quintet, the Nonet and other chamber music, played by Burkhard Jäckle, Lisa Outred, Albert Osterhammer, Ulrich Haider, Lyndon Watts, Odette Couch, Kirsty Hilton, Isabel Charisius, the composer and Matthias Weber (including several members of the Munich Philharmonic), conducted by Yaron Traub.

The version for bagpipe and string orchestra was recorded in 2002 (released in 2004) by Graham Waller and the English Chamber Orchestra, conducted by Traub. A reviewer noted that it is "a deeply serious work", with the Highland Bagpipe "a real partner in this virile, rousing piece of music".
