= Incantations (Waterhouse) =

Composition for piano and ensemble by Graham Waterhouse

- Concerto da camera
- Chamber concerto by Graham Waterhouse
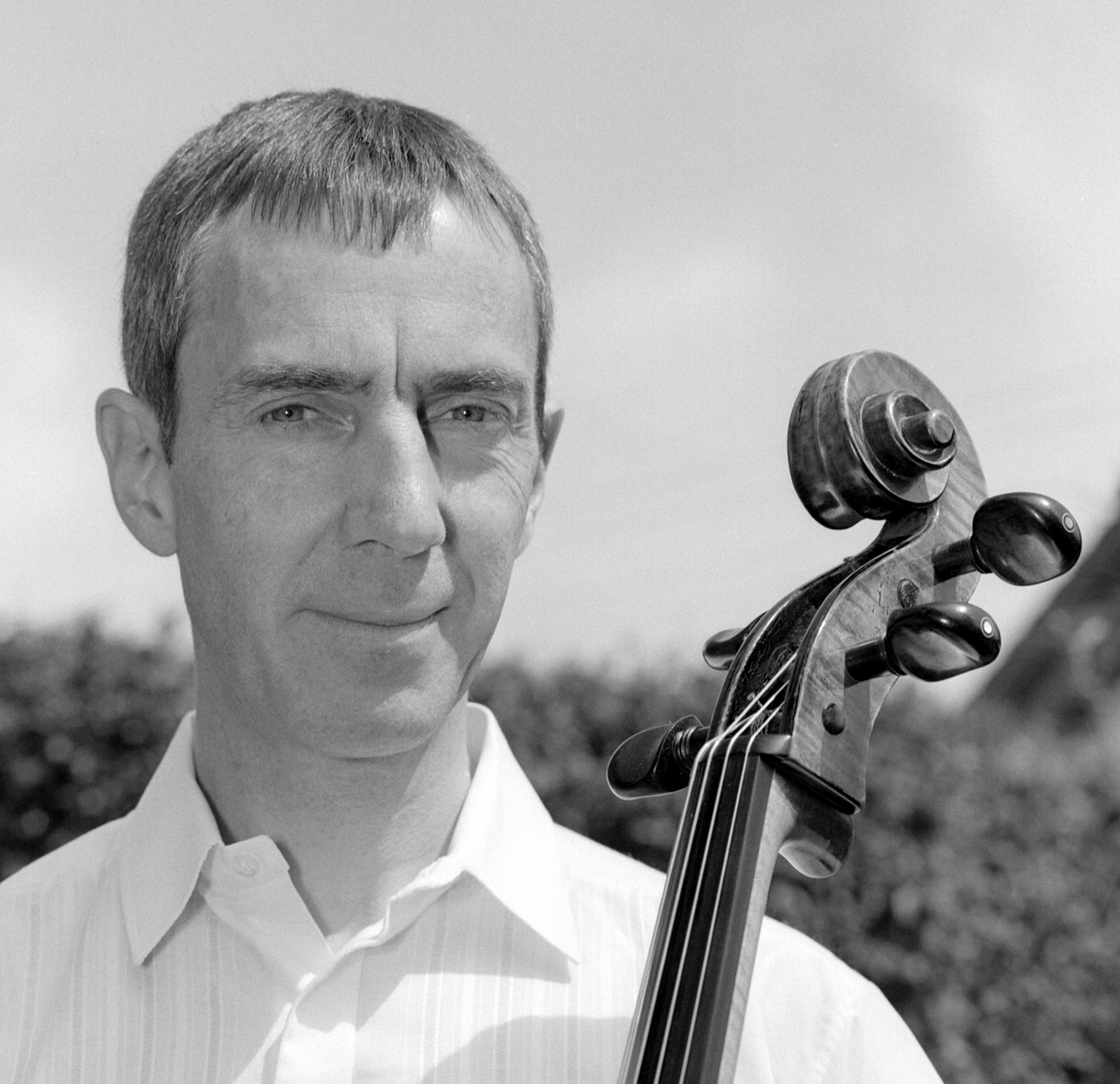
- Composer Graham Waterhouse, 2011
- Year: 2015
- Period: contemporary
- Performed: 26 March 2015
- Movements: five

Incantations, subtitled Concerto da camera (chamber concerto), is a composition for piano and ensemble by Graham Waterhouse, composed in 2015 and first performed in Birmingham.

== History ==
Graham Waterhouse wrote the composition as part of studies at the Birmingham University. The work was premiered at the CBSO Centre, Birmingham, on 26 March 2015, played by pianist Huw Watkins and the Birmingham Contemporary Music Group, conducted by Richard Baker. The first performance in Germany was played at the Allerheiligen-Hofkirche in Munich on 4 October 2015 by pianist Michael Schöch and the ensemble Blauer Reiter with the composer playing the cello part, conducted by Armando Merino. The concert was dedicated to Pierre Boulez for his 90th birthday, and featured works by him and by Isabel Mundry, Peter Maxwell Davies and Arnold Schönberg's Pierrot Lunaire.

== Music ==
The chamber concerto is structured in five movements named Canto (chant):

1. Canto 1 – Moderato e Maestoso
2. Canto 2 – Allegro mosso
3. Canto 3 – Adagio
4. Canto 4 – Vivace assai subito
5. Canto 5 – Poco più mosso

The instruments in the ensemble are flute, clarinet, violin, cello and percussion.
