= Piano Album (Waterhouse) =

Collection of eight pieces for piano by Graham Waterhouse

- Piano pieces by Graham Waterhouse
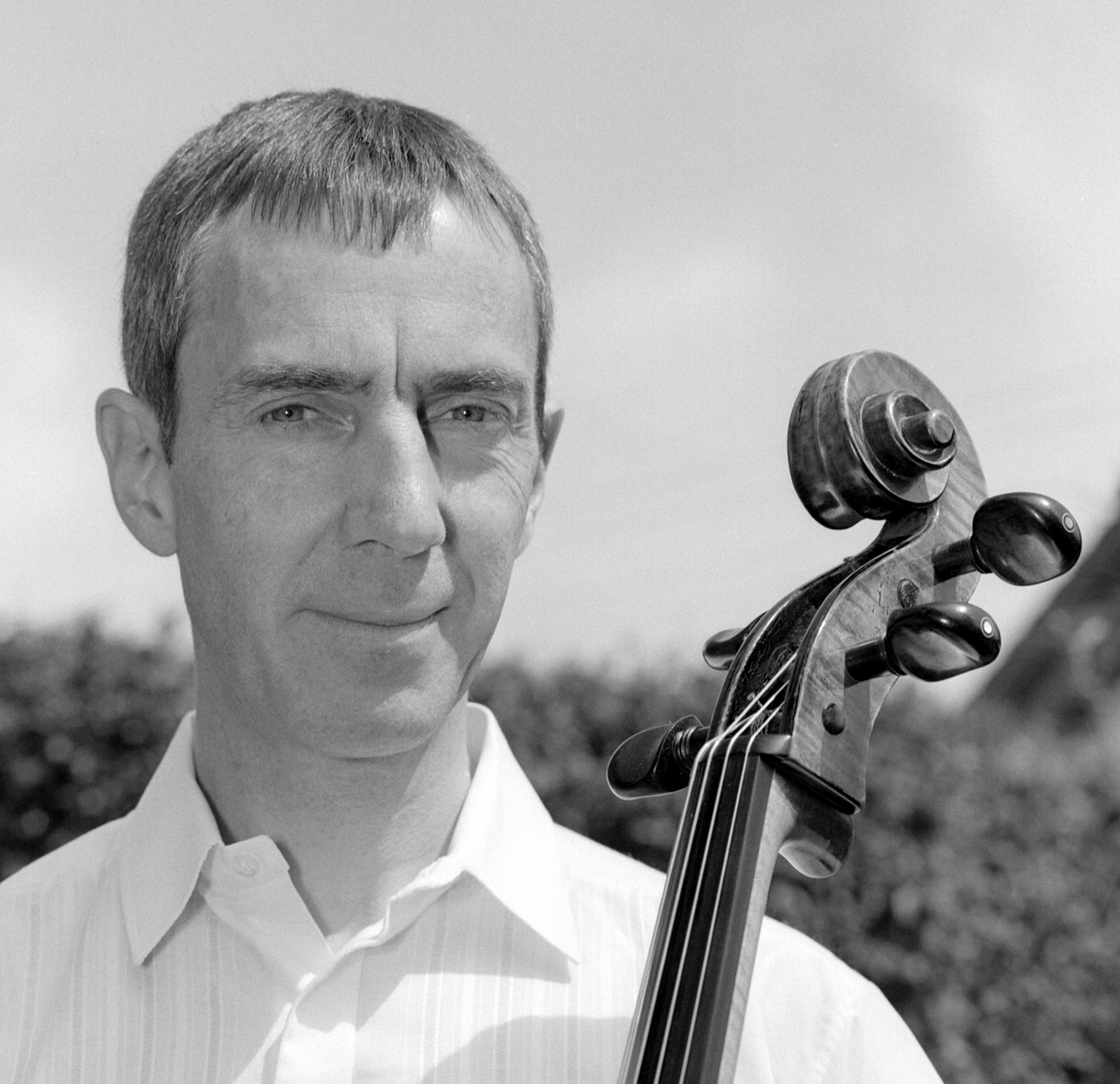
- The composer in 2011
- Period: contemporary
- Published: 2006
- Movements: 8

Piano Album is a collection of eight pieces for piano by Graham Waterhouse, published in 2006 by Lienau. The pieces were composed as dedications to family or friends.

== History ==
Waterhouse composed eight short piano pieces of two pages each over a longer period, beginning with Scherzino in 1984. Seven of them bear a dedication, by initials, to a family member or friend. Christopher White played a selection in a composer portrait at the Gasteig in Munich on 11 April 2011. The program featured also vocal music including the premiere of Im Gebirg, a song setting a poem by Hans Krieger.

Piano Album was published by Lienau in 2006. The pieces form a cycle, but a performer can make a selection and change the order. Each piece is focused on specific intervals.

The titles are:

1. Scherzino
2. Bagatelle
3. Barcarolle
4. Holstein Scherzo
5. Consternation
6. Hornpipe
7. Interlude
8. Monty's Waltz
