= Variations for Cello Solo =

Musical composition

Variations
- for Cello Solo
- by Graham Waterhouse
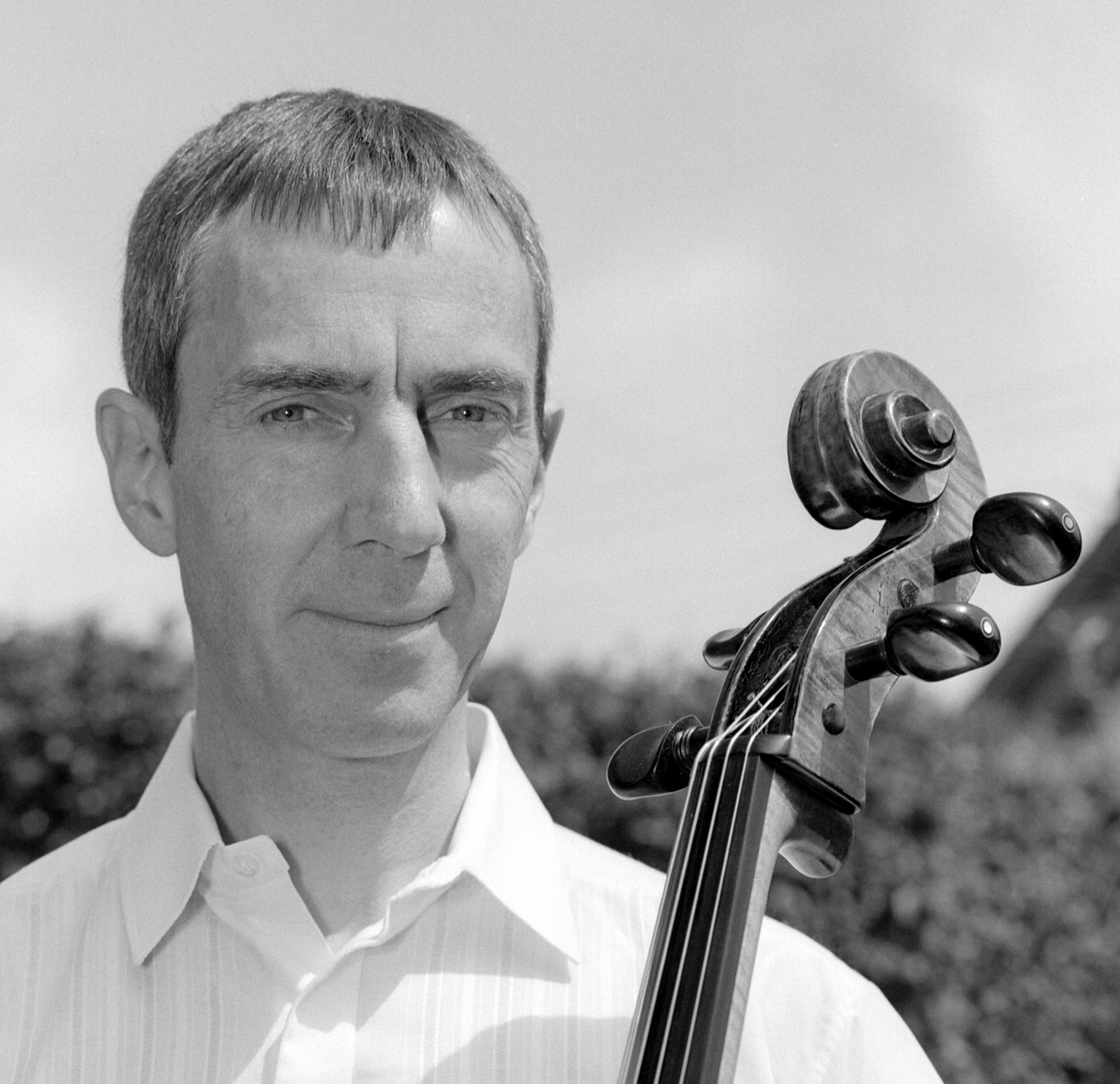
- Graham Waterhouse in 2011
- Composed: 2019
- Performed: 2020: Vienna
- Published: 2020: Mainz, Schott

Variations for Cello Solo (Variationen für Violoncello solo) is a composition written by Graham Waterhouse in 2019. The variations depict characters of personalities. The cellist and composer performed the world premiere in Vienna in 2020. The composition was published by Schott the same year.

== History ==
The cellist and composer Graham Waterhouse has written many works of chamber music including cello, but few works for solo cello, besides the Three Pieces for Solo Cello in 1996. He composed a set of variations for cello solo in December 2019 for a family gathering. Similar to Elgar's Enigma Variations, the character variations depict family members in characteristic moods, movements and manners. The early variations stay closely to the theme; later variations are more loosely connected to it. The last variation is expanded to a coda, which returns to a repetition of the theme, as a symbol for the family's continuity.

The composer played the public premiere at the Alte Schmiede in Vienna on 14 February 2020, as part of a chamber music program with soprano Beata Beck and pianist Nino Gurevich, including works by Leonard Bernstein, Friedrich Cerha, Richard Dünser, Arnold Schönberg and Kurt Weill. The composition was published by Schott in Mainz the same year, dedicated to Young-Chang Cho, the composer's former teacher at the Folkwang Hochschule. The duration is given as 8 minutes. The composition is part of a concert on 6 March 2021 at the Gasteig in Munich, with music by Beethoven and Waterhouse for one to five players, with Katharina Sellheim, David Frühwirth, Namiko Fuse and Konstantin Sellheim.
