= Chinese Whispers (Waterhouse) =

String quartet composition by Graham Waterhouse

- String quartet by Graham Waterhouse
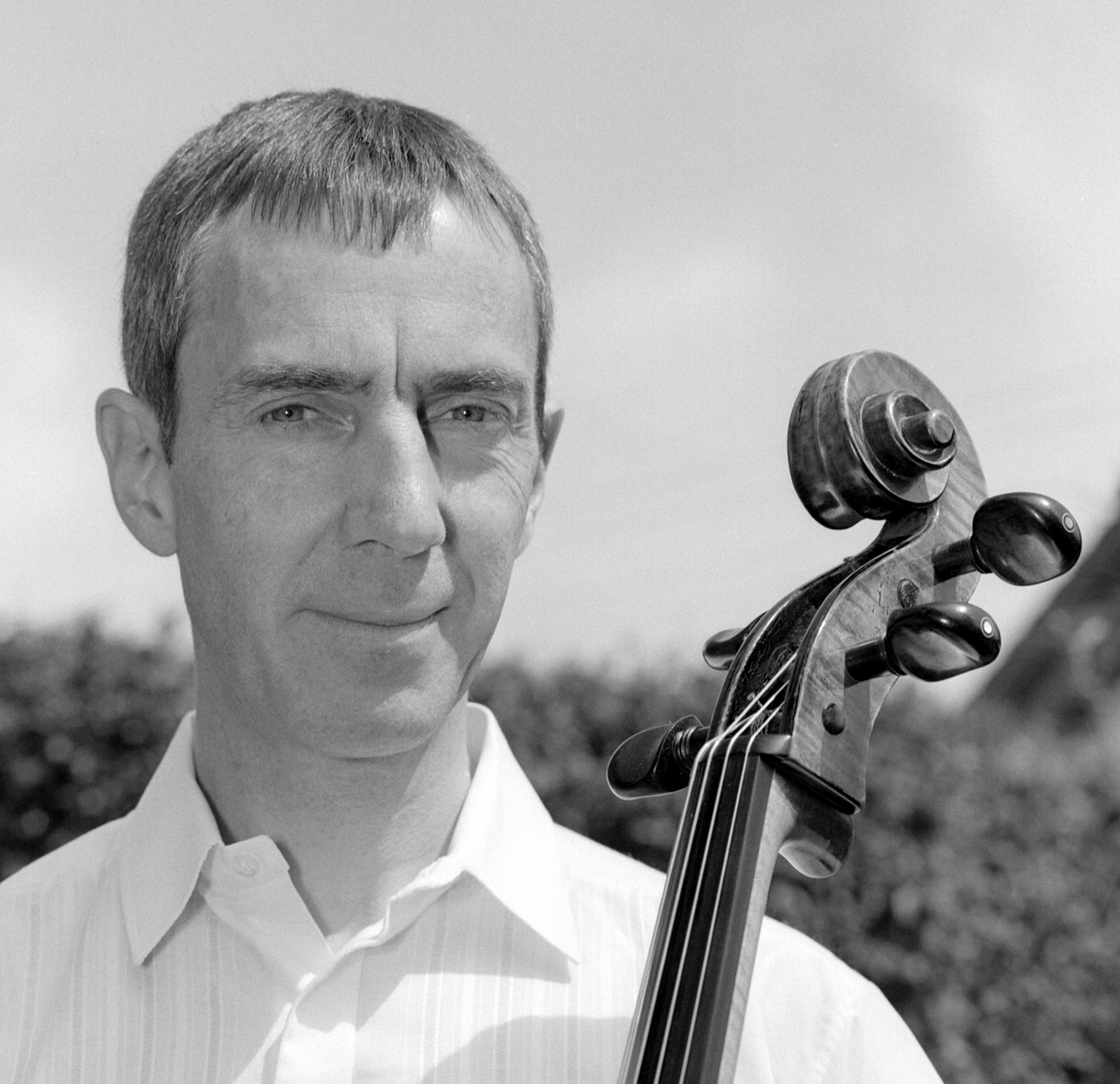
- The composer in 2011
- Year: 2010
- Period: contemporary
- Movements: 3
- Scoring: two violins, viola, cello

Chinese Whispers is a composition for string quartet in three movements by Graham Waterhouse. Premiered in 2010, it combines elements from the music of China with composition techniques of Western classical music. Similar to the children's game, phrases change as they pass from part to part. The work was awarded the "BCMS Composition Prize" of the Birmingham Chamber Music Society in 2011.

== History ==
The impetus for the composition came from a European family living in Shanghai. They wanted music combining aspects of Eastern and Western culture for their two eldest children to play with two Chinese musicians.

== Movements ==
There are three movements:

1. Lento – Adagio e maestoso – Moderato
2. Allegro (pizzicato)
3. Vivace

== Music ==
The work uses Chinese elements such as the pentatonic scale, seen from the perspective of a classically trained European composer. The title refers to the children's game in which a message is whispered from one child to the next and slowly changes. This process, a phrase changing almost imperceptibly as it passes from part to part, is a compositional procedure of the piece.

The composer describes the work: "The first movement opens with the stylized chiming of a great imaginary temple bell, as if calling to attention." The themes in the following "Moderato" occasionally use pentatonic scale in modes shown to the composer by the Chinese Jinghu player. Different from Chinese music, the thematic material is developed.

The second movement is like a Scherzo and Trio in ambiguous triple/duple time. Played almost entirely pizzicato with the exception of ten bars in the centre of the movement, it is "a study in texture and voice-leading, combining the brittle pizzicato of the E-string of the violin with the resonant lower strings of the cello".

The last movement recalls the Rondo-form, but "the main theme is forever changing and re-inventing itself. A short violin cadenza "seems to caricature the perpetual forward momentum of the work, deceiving the listener with speed changes and abrupt changes of rhythmic direction".

== Selected performances ==
The work was first tried in the opening concert of the National Chamber Music Course, a summer course in Preston, UK, where the composer has worked as an instructor. The first professional performance was played at the Gasteig in Munich on 14 November 2011, combined with the composer's Piccolo Quintet. It appeared in a concert in Gilching of chamber music by Beethoven and Waterhouse, together with Rhapsodie Macabre for piano and string quartet, played by Valentina Babor. A review in the Süddeutsche Zeitung noted its diverse colours, from delicate translucency to dashing folklore.

== Award ==
The work received the chamber music prize of the Birmingham Chamber Music Society (BCMS), the "BCMS Composition Prize", in the society's 60th anniversary season. It was performed on 18 February 2012 by the Poggi String Quartet in the Adrian Boult Hall of the Birmingham Conservatoire, together with works of Schubert (Trout Quintet), Britten (Lachrymae) and the premiere of Berceuse by John McCabe, a commission of the BCMS. The review noted: "A totally accessible work depicting the mysterious East, very oriental – smiling music".
