= Perplexities after Escher =

2024 music composition

- Chamber music by Graham Waterhouse
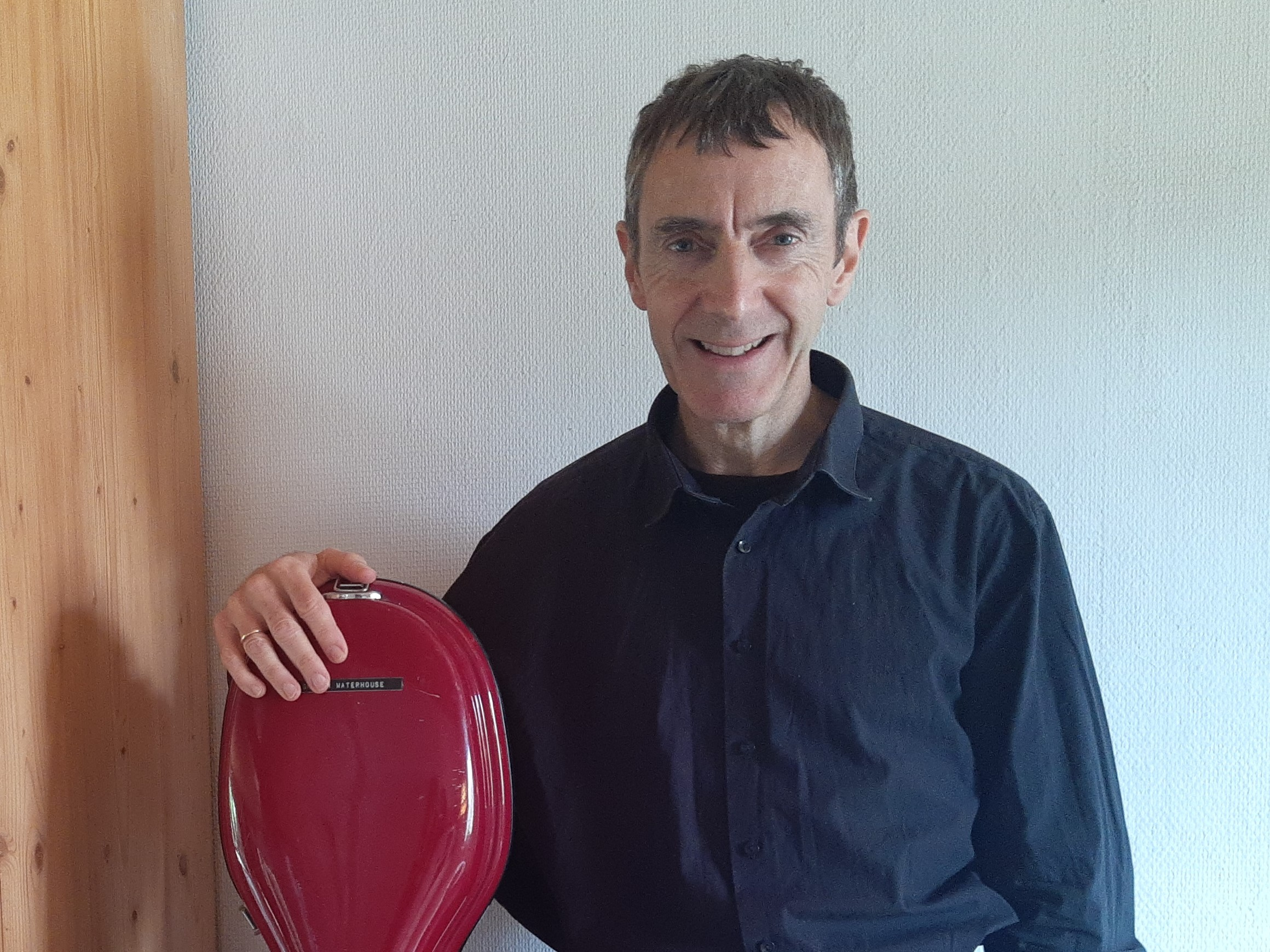
- Waterhouse in 2024
- Based on: artworks by M. C. Escher
- Performed: 7 June 2024: Garmisch-Partenkirchen
- Movements: 5
- Scoring: heckelphone; string quartet; double bass

Perplexities after Escher is a chamber music composition by Graham Waterhouse for heckelphone, string quartet and double bass. Its five movements refer to graphic artworks by M. C. Escher. It was composed between 2022 and 2024 for the 120th anniversary of the introduction of the heckelphone, and premiered in Garmisch-Partenkirchen. The piece will be published by Schott.

== History ==
The heckelphone is a rare member of the oboe family prominently used by Richard Strauss, Frederick Delius and Paul Hindemith. It was introduced by Wilhelm Heckel and sons in 1904. In 1993, Waterhouse composed a work inspired by graphic artworks by M. C. Escher which used the heckelphone: Four Epigraphs after Escher, a piano trio for viola and heckelphone in four movements.

Waterhouse composed Perplexities after Escher between 2022 and 2024 for the 120th anniversary of the introduction of the instrument. Heckelphone player Holger Hoos had commissioned a work for heckelphone and strings, and Waterhouse decided to use string quartet and double bass, the latter to correspond with the low register and wide range of the wind instrument. Hoos initiated the idea to base the composition again on works by Escher, and Waterhouse chose five early graphics, created before Escher went into three-dimensional illusions.

Perplexities after Escher was premiered in Garmisch-Partenkirchen, where Strauss lived, on 7 June 2024 within a symposium, the 2024 Richard Strauss Festival, around the instrument, with expositions and lectures. It was performed by Hoos, the Graffe Quartet (Štěpán Graffe, Lukáš Bednařík, Luboš Melničák and Michal Hreňo) and Miloslav Jelínek (double bass). The work was played again in two portrait concerts with an identical program in Munich and Münsing around the composer's birthday in November 2024, together with arrangements of solo compositions by Beethoven and Bach, and String Sextet op. 1. It was performed by Hoos (heckelphone), David Frühwirth and Anna Kakutia (violin), Chialong Tsai (viola), Waterhouse (cello) and Thomas Herbst (double bass). The composition is in preparation to be published by Schott in 2024. The duration is given as 17 minutes.

== Images and music ==
The composition is structured in five movements:

1. Levenkracht (Life force) – Allegramente
2. Atrani – Adagio piangendo
3. Draak (Dragon) – Presto scurrile
4. Castrovalva – Moderato
5. Kringloop – Con moto energico

The first movement was inspired by a 1919 graphic entitled Levenkracht (Life force). The image inspiring the second movement is Atrani, Coast of Amalfi, printed in 1931, the third Dragon (1951), the fourth Castrovalva (1930), and the fifth Kringloop (1938).
