= Young-Chang Cho =

- Born: 1958; Seoul, South Korea
- Education: Curtis Institute of Music; New England Conservatory of Music
- Occupations: Classical cellist; Academic teacher
- Organizations: Folkwang University of the Arts; Yonsei University

Young-Chang Cho (born 1958) is a South Korean classical cellist teaching at the Folkwang University of the Arts in Germany's Ruhr Area.

== Career ==
Young-Chang Cho was born in Seoul, South Korea in 1958. He began cello lessons at the age of eight. From 1971, he studied in the United States with David Soyer at the Curtis Institute of Music of Philadelphia, and later with Laurence Lesser at the New England Conservatory of Music in Boston. In 1980, he continued his studies in Europe with Siegfried Palm and Mstislav Rostropovich.

In 1981 he won a prize at the Concours de violoncelle Rostropovitch in Paris and was repeatedly invited to serve in its jury. He also received prizes at the International Cello Competition Pablo Casals in Budapest and at the ARD International Music Competition in Munich.

As a chamber musician he formed the Cho Piano Trio with his sisters Young-Mi Cho (violin) and Young-Bang Cho (piano), receiving prizes at the Geneva International Music Competition in 1977 and at the ARD competition in 1980.

As a soloist, he performed with the Washington National Symphony Orchestra conducted by Rostropovitch and in Tokyo, Sofia and Bologna, among others. He was invited for solo recitals and master classes to international music festivals such as Academie Internationale de Musique de Montpellier and the Kronberg Academy (1993 in memory of Pablo Casals, 1995 in memory of Emanuel Feuermann and Jacqueline du Pré, 1997 celebrating the 70th birthday of Rostropovitch). He was a juror there for the first International Pablo Casals Cello Competition in 2000 and the second in 2004.

Since 1987 he has been teaching violoncello at the Folkwang Hochschule, now Folkwang University of the Arts. His students have included Saerom Park and Graham Waterhouse who dedicated the 2019 composition Variations for Cello Solo to him. He has taught at the Yonsei University College of Music in Seoul from 2011.
