= Der Handschuh (Waterhouse) =

Composition by Graham Waterhouse

- by Graham Waterhouse
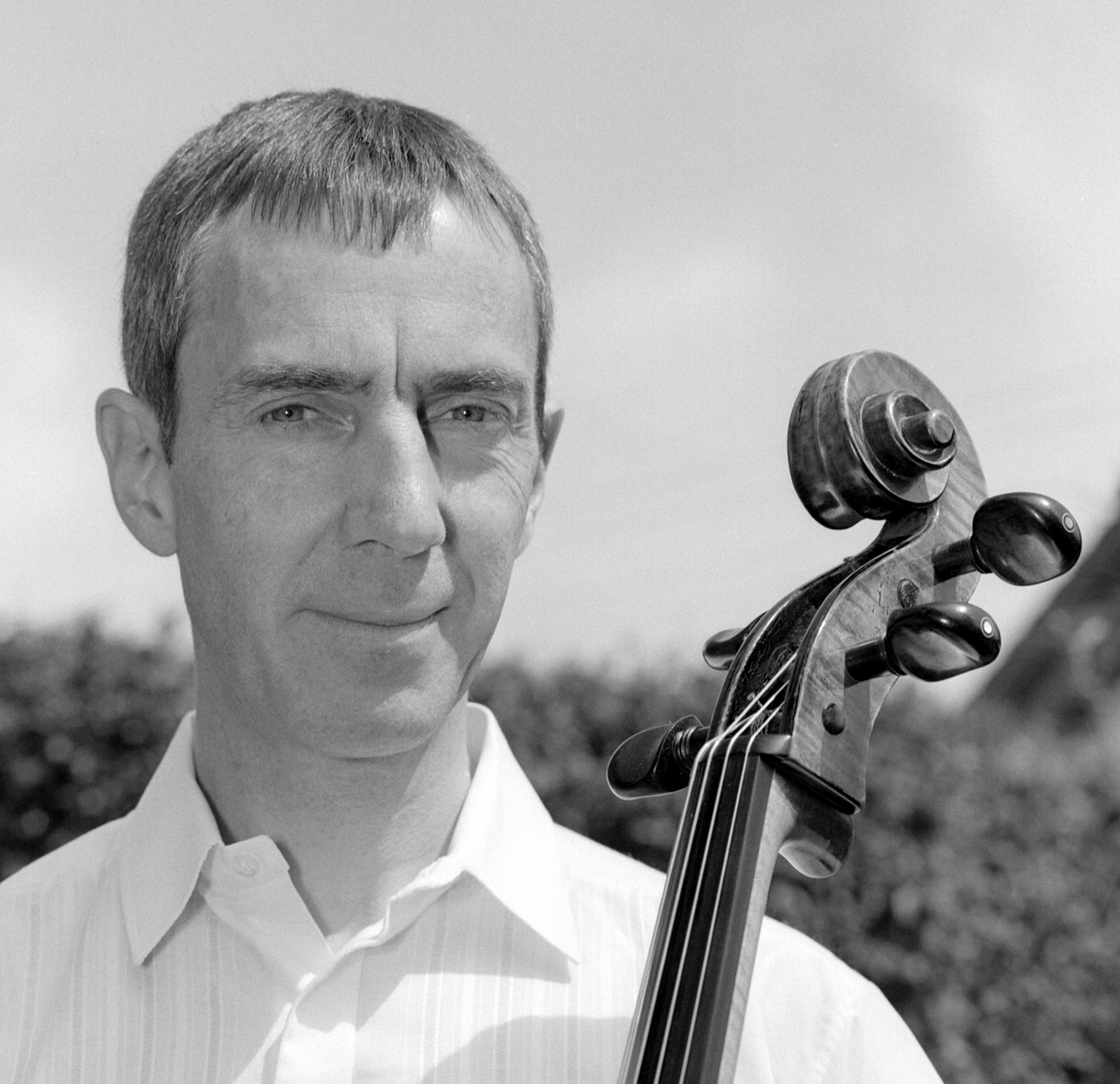
- Composer Graham Waterhouse, 2011
- English: The Glove
- Year: 2005
- Period: contemporary
- Text: Friedrich Schiller: Der Handschuh
- Published: 2007: Wilhelmshaven Heinrichshofen's Verlag
- Movements: 1
- Scoring: cello, speaking voice

Der Handschuh (The Glove) is a composition by Graham Waterhouse. He wrote the setting of Friedrich Schiller's ballad for cello and speaking voice in 2005. It was published in 2007 in Heinrichshofen's Verlag.

== History of cello and speaking voice ==
Graham Waterhouse composed Der Handschuh in 2005, as a kind of melodrama in the tradition of spoken narrative to instrumental accompaniment, such as ballads by Robert Schumann and Richard Strauss, a crucial scene of Weber's opera Der Freischütz and 20th century settings by Schoenberg, William Walton, Henze and Poulenc's L'Histoire de Babar, le petit éléphant. It is the composer's first major work for the combination of Sprechstimme (speaking voice) and his instrument, the cello. Until then he had occasionally set texts to music for the unusual scoring. In 1995 he wrote Vezza, a limerick on whether/weather as a German might pronounce it, recorded in 2002 with the composer speaking and playing. In 2001 he set Flohlied (Song of the Flea), the satirical song from Goethe's Faust I, to music, published by Heinrichshofen's Verlag. The final poem of his song cycle Sechs späteste Lieder (six latest songs, 2003) after Friedrich Hölderlin for mezzo-soprano and cello is spoken.

He composed Der Handschuh in 2005 for the 200th anniversary of Schiller's death. Following its success, he wrote more frequently for the combination of cello and speaking voice. In 2006 he set to music Animalia, three funny poems on animals by Hans Krieger. In 2007 he wrote Das Hexen-Einmaleins (The Witches One-Times-One), again from Goethe's Faust and published by Heinrichshofen's Verlag in 2009., the dramatic monologue Aases Himmelfahrt from Henrik Ibsen's Peer Gynt, Gruselett after Christian Morgenstern's nonsense poem for three speaking voices and string trio, and Belsatzar on Heinrich Heine's Romanze. In 2010 he composed Der Werwolf after a poem by Morgenstern, and a different setting The Banshee on its English version by Max Knight.

== Plot and composition ==
The composer summarises the ballad Der Handschuh, which Schiller wrote in 1797 in a friendly ballad competition with Goethe: "The story is set in the reign of the French King François I. In it the king stages a fight between a variety of wild animals for the entertainment of his guests (we read in the "Essais historiques sur Paris" of Monsieur de Saint-Foix that an arena existed in what is now known as the "Rue des Lions" in Paris). The animals, however, prove to be placid creatures: the real contest plays itself out among the spectators, when a certain Dame Cunigund challenges her lover to demonstrate his affection for her by retrieving a glove she had affected to let fall accidentally into the arena. This he does, to the amazement of the crowd; at the end, however, events take an unexpected turn."

The different actors, including the animals, are portrayed musically in leitmotifs. The piece is intended to be performed by one person reciting and playing, but can also be performed by a cellist and a speaker.

== Performances ==
The composer has frequently performed the work speaking and playing simultaneously. He showed it in 2005 in a portrait concert in St. Martin, Idstein, and in a Gesprächskonzert (lecture concert) in Würzburg. In 2008 he performed it in Cambridge in a program "Melodrama revisited – new compositions for cello and speaking voice", while he was a "Musician By-Fellow" at Churchill College. The program was repeated for a composer's colloquium at the University of Oldenburg, conducted by Violeta Dinescu. Waterhouse also performed the work with a speaker, such as Gerd Udo Feller (in German) at the Gasteig Munich on 14 December 2008, in a program with works by Bach, Pablo Neruda, Benjamin Britten, Paul Hindemith, and with other settings for cello and speaking voice by Waterhouse. On 12 December 2011 he performed it with speaker Peter Weiß (in German) in a family concert in Gilching, together with Flohlied and Der Werwolf.

== Publication ==
Der Handschuh was published in 2007 in both German and English by Heinrichshofen's Verlag, Wilhelmshaven, which also published Flohlied, Das Hexen-Einmaleins and Gruselett.
