= Bells of Beyond =

Piano trio by Graham Waterhouse

- Piano trio by Graham Waterhouse
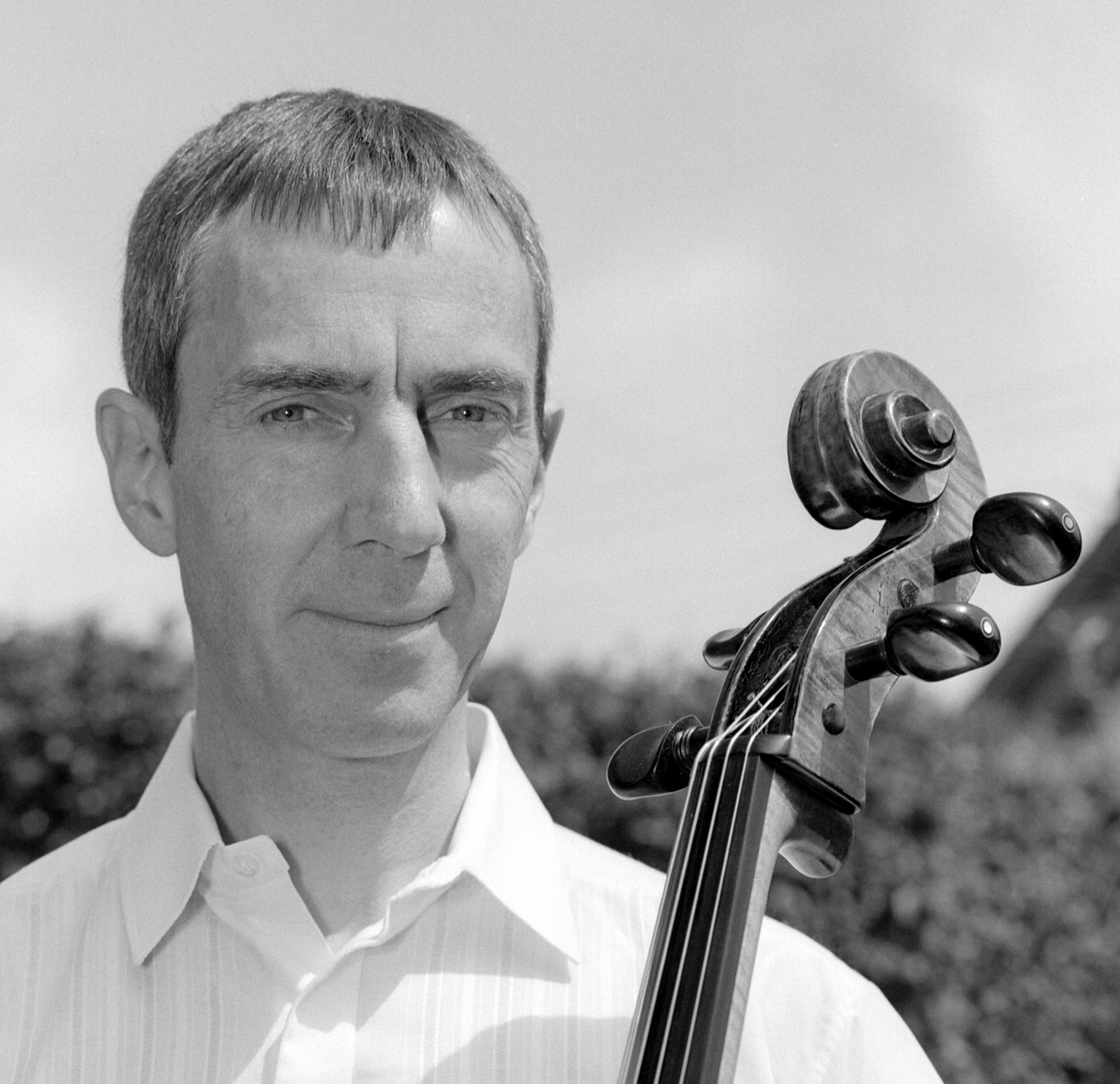
- The composer in 2011
- Year: 2013
- Period: contemporary
- Scoring: piano; violin; cello
- Official website

Bells of Beyond is a piano trio, composed in 2013 by Graham Waterhouse.

The work was composed in 2013. It is dedicated to the memory of the Welsh pianist and composer Dafydd Llywelyn who was a teacher of the composer and died in the spring of 2013 in Munich.

The composition was inspired by bells. It is in three sections: slow – fast – slow. It opens with chords in the piano reminiscent of bells, a motif repeated throughout the piece. The first part is dominated by a chaconne on a theme of eight measures. The middle section is a virtuoso "argument" between the piano and the strings. The third section is introduced by a recalling the initial bells. It features a series of parallel chords, and ends with the bells.

The trio was first performed at the Gasteig in Munich on 27 October 2013, played by the violinist Yury Revich, the pianist Valentina Babor, and the composer. The work was played at the festival Beethovenfest in Bonn on 2 October 2016, along with Beethoven's Piano Trio, Op. 1/3 in C minor and Mendelssohn's Piano Trio No. 2 in the same key, music by three composers who venerate Shakespeare.

Bells of Beyond is part of a CD Skylla und Charybdis of the composer's works for piano and strings. It was released in 2020 by Farao Classics, and introduced by a concert at the Munich Gasteig on 6 March 2021. A reviewer of Das Orchester noted that the work is derived from bell-like piano sounds, developing to soft and quiet pulses of the strings, and arriving in different music situations. A reviewer from the Süddeutsche Zeitung described the music as "almost magical" and "a hauntingly beautiful breeze from a Beyond".
