= String Sextet (Waterhouse) =

String sextet in four movements by Graham Waterhouse

String Sextet op. 1
- by Graham Waterhouse
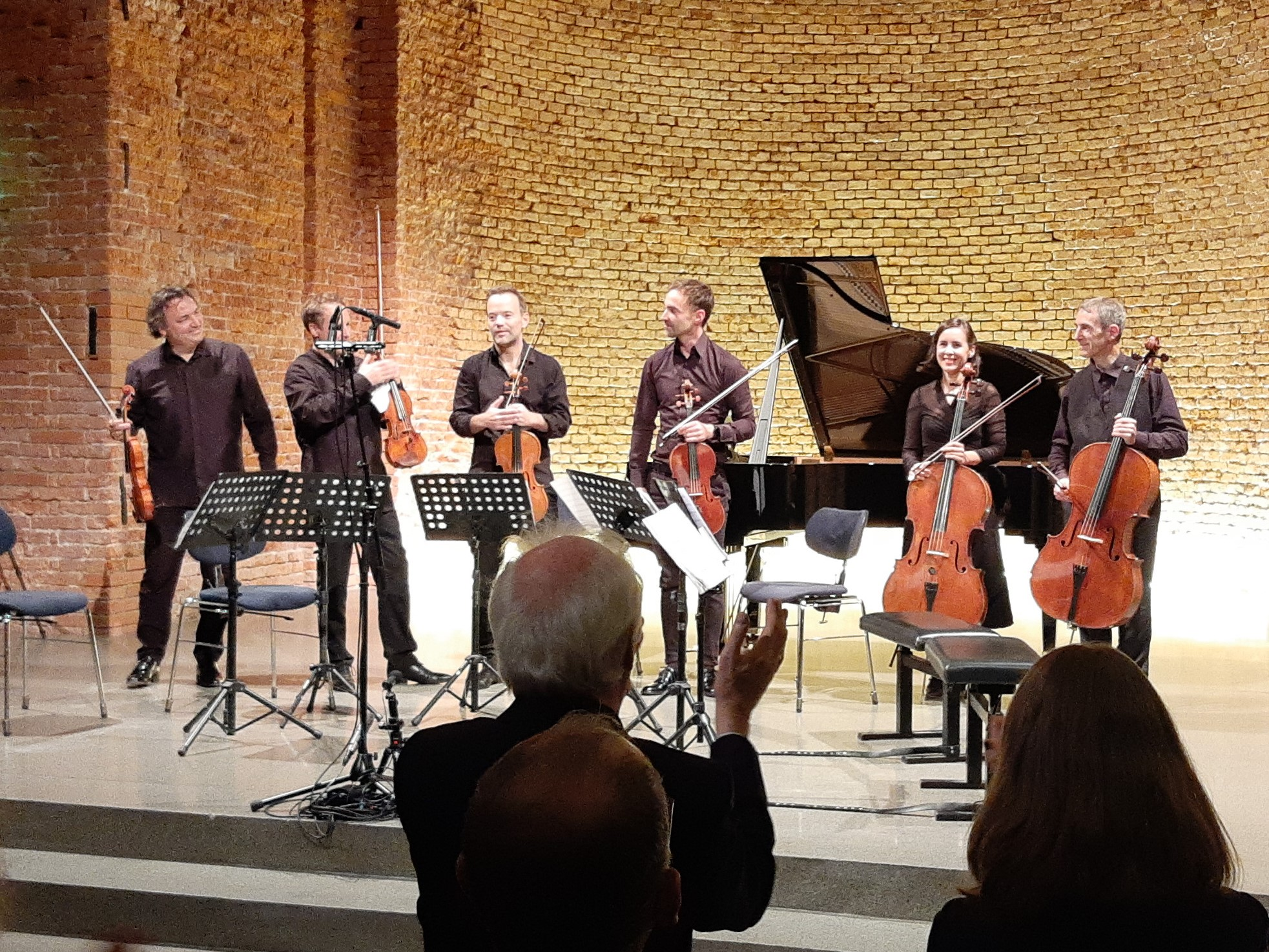
- Waterhouse (r.) and colleagues after a performance at the Allerheiligen-Hofkirche on 5 November 2022
- Opus: 1
- Period: contemporary
- Composed: 1979, 2013
- Movements: 4

Premiere
- Date: February 9, 2014
- Location: Gasteig, Munich

The String Sextet, Op. 1, is a string sextet in four movements by Graham Waterhouse. While the composer began the work as one movement in 1979, he completed it in four movements in 2013. The completed version was first performed at the Gasteig in Munich on 9 February 2014.

== History ==
While still at Highgate School, Waterhouse intended to compose a string sextet, following models such as the first String Sextet by Brahms. He composed one movement which was performed for a school music competition. It was the first work he found worthy of an opus number. The Boulez pupil and scholar Susan Bradshaw commented: "while searching for an independent voice, it still didn't sound like anyone else".

A second movement was begun in 1983 as part of university studies in fugue. The third movement was conceived on a trip to Czechoslovakia and Poland in the mid-1980s. The fourth movement was begun at the same time and is based on a theme from Macedonia. Both the third and the fourth movement were completed in 2013, 34 years after the beginning of the work.

== Structure and music ==
The work for two violins, two violas and two cellos is in four movements:

1. Allegro con anima
2. Fugue – Adagio fanatico
3. Scherzo – Allegro vivace
4. Moderato (basato su ricordi di un tema macedone)

The first movement is tonal music in sonata form, reminiscent of the sextets by Johannes Brahms. The second movement, marked "Adagio fanatico", is a fugue which follows Baroque forms but uses a "slightly abrasive, modal harmonic language". It features a rhythmic ostinato. In the Scherzo, the strings play layered ("geschichtet"). The fial movement is domiated by a Macedonian folksong with characteristic rhythms. From the beginning, the work has clear contours and skilful sextet sound.

== Performances ==
After the first performance at Highgate school, the first movement was performed again at chamber concert at Cambridge University in 1982. The completed version was first performed at the Gasteig in Munich on 9 February 2014 in a program of chamber music by Mozart and Waterhouse, with members of the Munich Philharmonic and the composer as the cellist. The UK premiere was played on 1 May 2016 as part of the Whittall Barn Concert Series by the Anern Trio and the Waterhouse Trio, along with the string trios Zeichenstaub and Epitaphium. The sextet was notably played as part of GW60, a concert on 5 November 2022 at the Allerheiligen-Hofkirche in Munich to celebrate the composer's 60th birthday. The performers were David Frühwirth, Clément Courtin, Konstantin Sellheim, Valentin Eichler, Katerina Giannitsioti and the composer.

In preparation for publication by Schott Music, Waterhouse then dedicated the composition to his mother, Elisabeth Waterhouse, saying that her lifelong dedication to chamber music, especially her pioneering work at the National Chamber Music Course summer schools from the mid-1970s, was a major inspiration for the work.
