= Concentricities =

Piano trio by Graham Waterhouse

- Piano trio by Graham Waterhouse
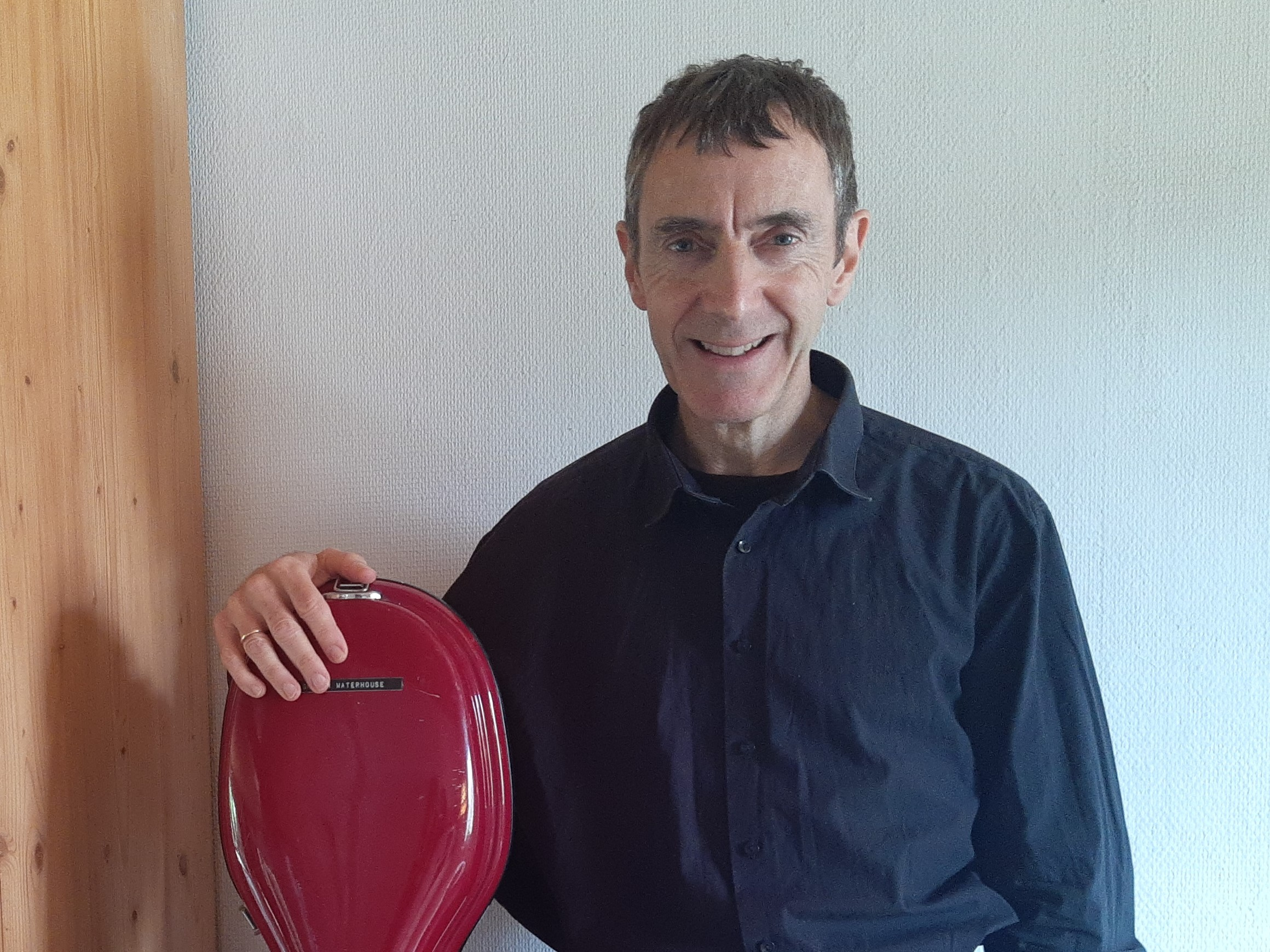
- Waterhouse in 2024
- Year: 2019
- Published: Schott Music
- Movements: 5
- Scoring: clarinet; cello; piano

Concentricities is a piano trio by Graham Waterhouse composed in 2019 for clarinet, cello and piano. It was premiered, with the composer as the cellist, at the Gasteig in Munich the same year. It was published by Schott Music in 2022.

== History ==
In 2019, Waterhouse was inspired by concentric phenomena in nature and culture, and allusions to "cities", to write Concentricities in five movements for a clarinet–cello–piano trio. The work was published by Schott Music in 2022.

The composition is structured in five movements, with a total duration given as 13 minutes:

1. "Birds of Prey"
2. "Cityscapes"
3. "Pagoda"
4. "Oscillations"
5. "Ring of Stone"

== Performances ==
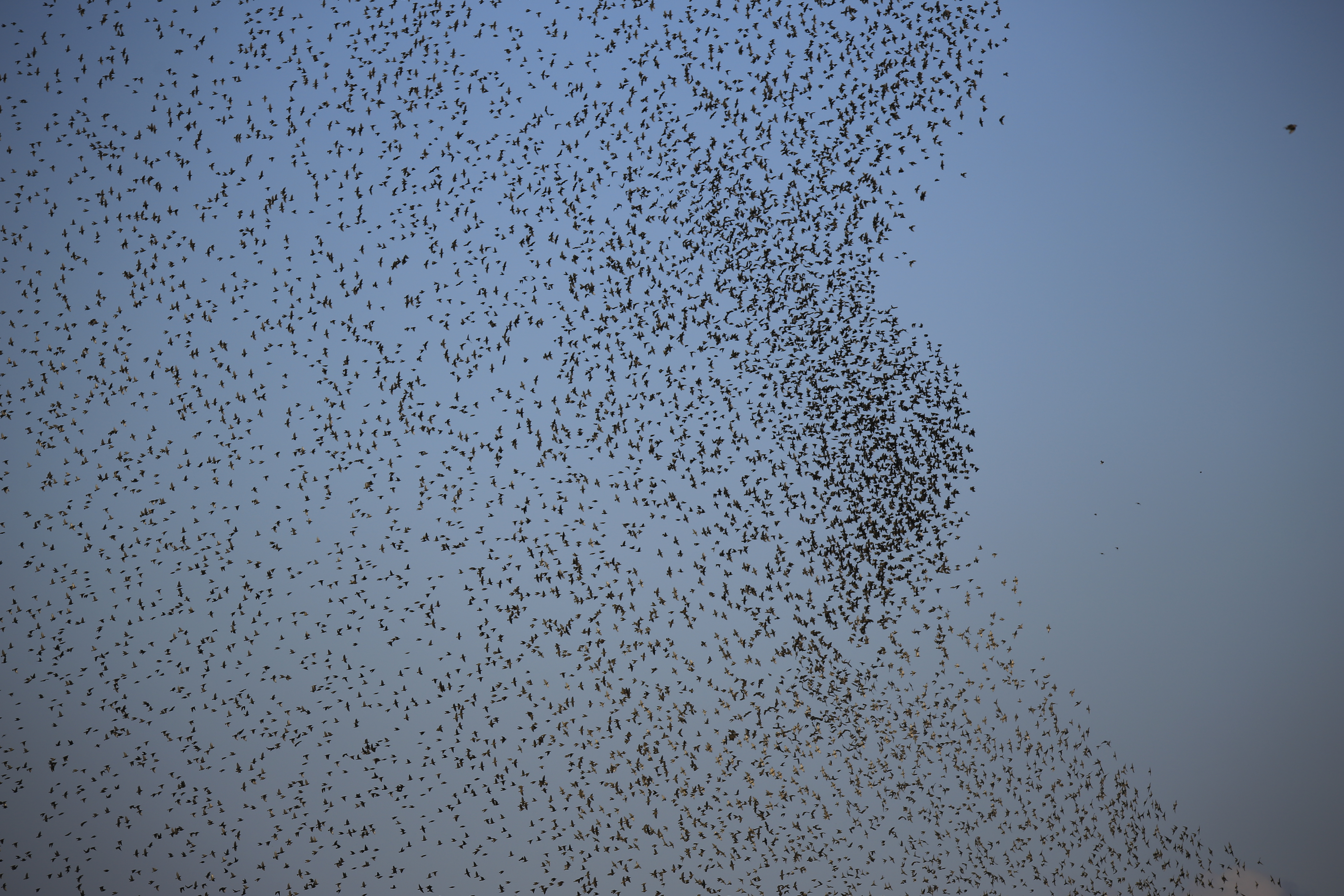
A flock of spiralling birds

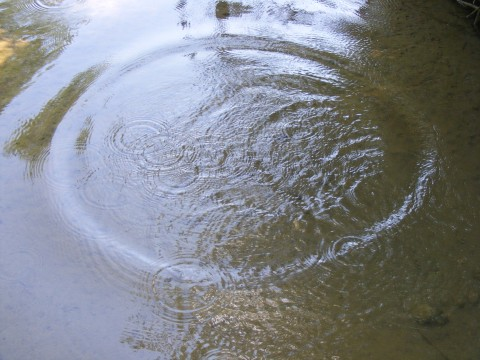
Circular ripples in water

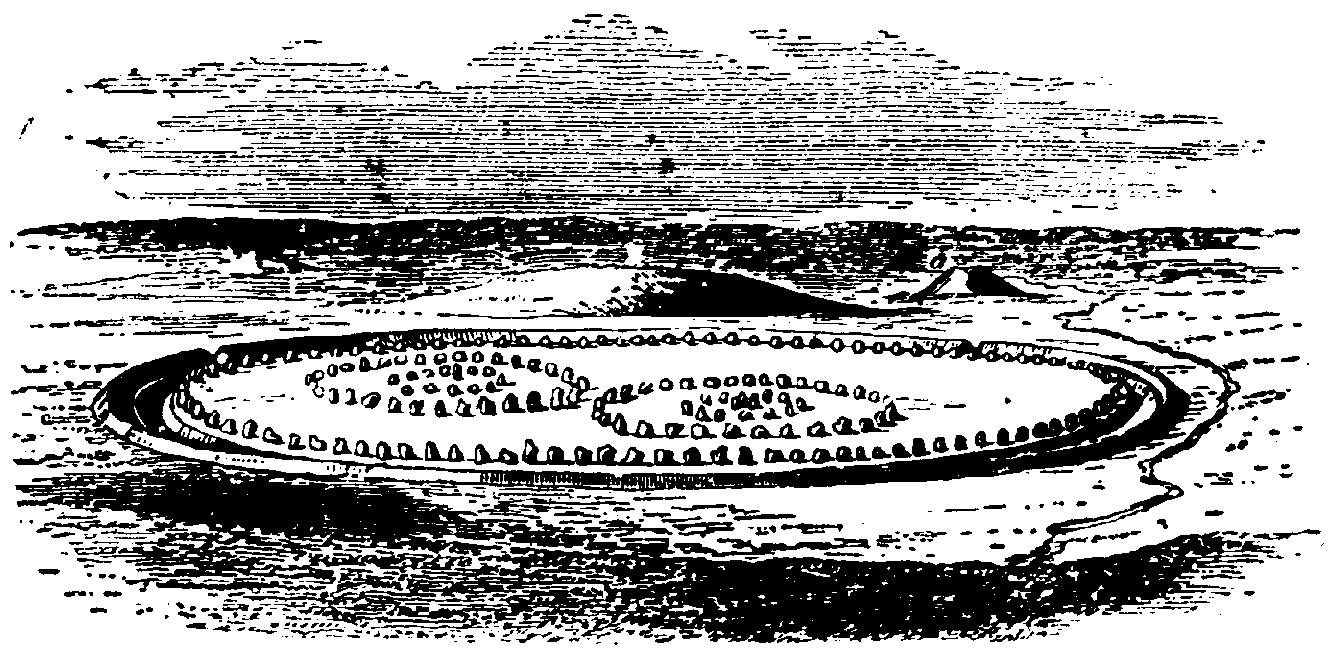
Avebury stone circle

Concentricities was first performed at the Gasteig in Munich on 10 November 2019 by Hans-Joachim Büsching, the solo clarinettist of the Beethoven Orchester Bonn, with Waterhouse as the cellist and Nino Gurevich as the pianist. The score was published by Schott Music.

A Süddeutsche Zeitung reviewer of a subsequent performance described the imagery of each movement as illustrating concentric, oscillating, circular, or spiralling movements or structures creating the common theme: in "Birds of Prey", a whirring start and then soaring circles; in "Cityscapes", the circular growth in the development of a city; in "Pagoda", a slightly grotesque approach; in "Oscillation", a picturesque way to illustrate when a stone falls into the water; and finally, in "Stone Circle", making prehistoric monumental stones audible.

A performance in the town hall of Gilching combined Concentricities with music by Gustav Mahler, Mark-Anthony Turnage, and the world premiere of Waterhouse's string quartet Alchymic Quartet. A day later, the piece was featured in a concert on the occasion of his 60th birthday at the Allerheiligen-Hofkirche in Munich, with Hans-Joachim Mohrmann, (Note: Hans-Joachim Büsching adopted the surname Mohrmann upon marriage.) and pianist Anna Karapetyan.
