= Zeichenstaub =

2010 string trio composition by Graham Waterhouse

- String trio by Graham Waterhouse
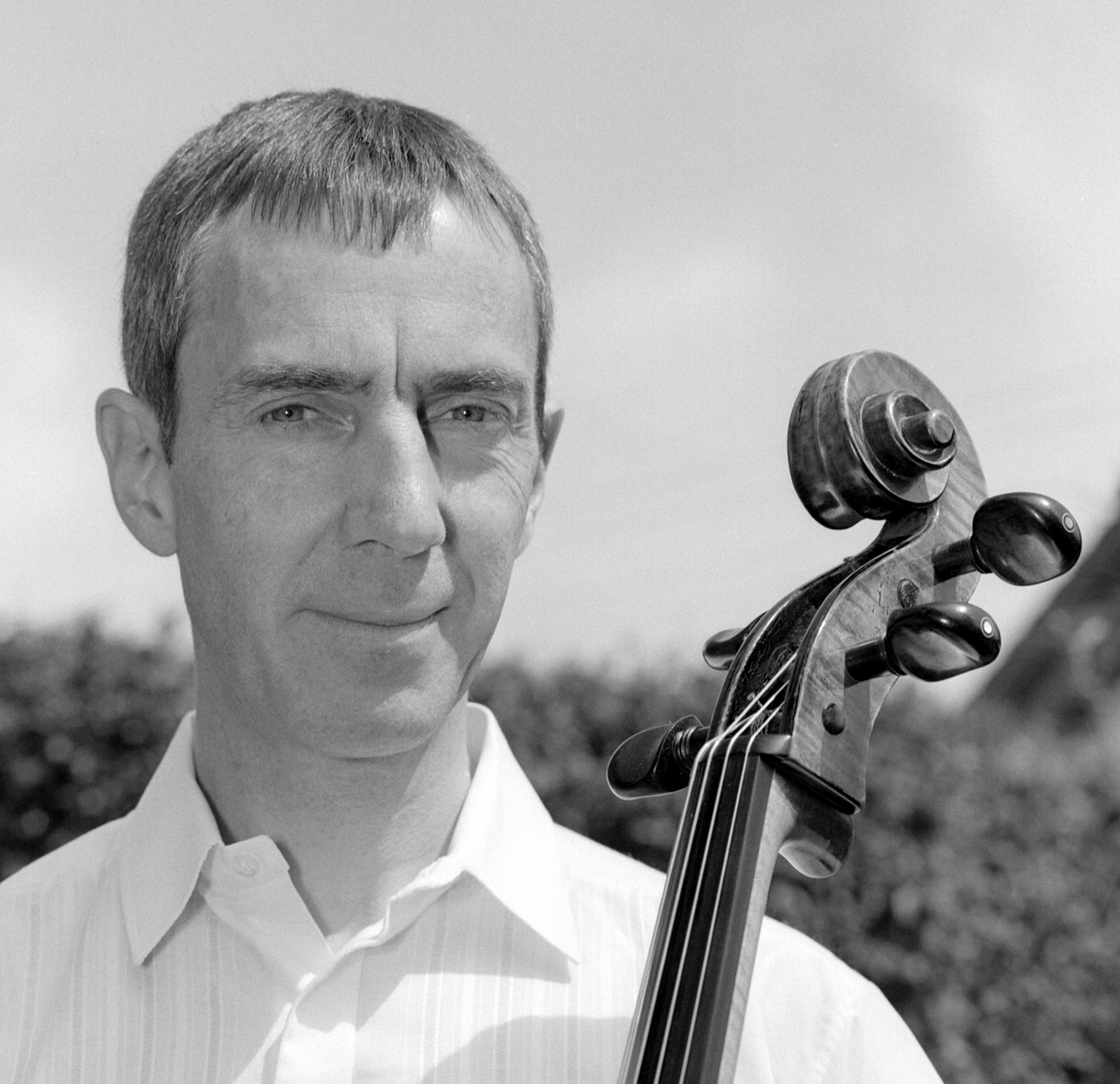
- Graham Waterhouse, composer and cellist in the premiere, 2011
- English: Symbol dust
- Year: 2010
- Period: contemporary
- Published: 2013: Frankfurt, Robert Lienau Musikverlag
- Movements: 4
- Scoring: violin; viola; cello

Zeichenstaub (Symbol dust) is a composition for string trio in four movements by Graham Waterhouse, written in 2010. It was first performed in Arnstadt, Germany, on 18 September 2010, with the composer playing the cello part.

== History, structure and music ==
The work was commissioned by the Hepp family. Damian Hosp (pen name of Kaspar Hepp) wrote a poem which reflects a black and white photograph of a skier. The poem describes the tracks left in the snow and the powdery snow thrown up in the air, described as "Zeichenstaub". The composer writes: "The idea of clear lines set against blurred textures as suggested by this intriguing word was a starting point in the composition of the piece." The work for violin, viola and cello is in four movements, with the dedication to the family reflected in their initials:

1. Halcyon – Allegro energico
2. Ethereal – Adagio tranquillo
3. Pointilliste – Moderato
4. Perpetuum – Allegro con moto

Each movement is dedicated to "its own sound-world". The first movement in Doric mode, opens with rising fifths, set against syncopated open fifths. The second movement is in harmonics, pizzicato and glissandi in a dialogue. The third movement reflects the painting technique of Pointillism in pizzicato. The final movement is a moto perpetuo, "the material continually transforms and re-invents itself with an urgency and rhythmic drive that finally leads the work to an energetic close".

== Performances and publishing ==
The premiere was played in Arnstadt on 18 September 2010, with the composer as the cellist. The UK premiere was performed and first recorded on 9 October 2012 at Highgate School by members of the Münchner Philharmoniker Clément Courtin and Konstantin Sellheim, with the composer, celebrating his 50th birthday.

Zeichenstaub was published by Robert Lienau Musikverlag, Frankfurt, in 2013. The trade journal ensemble reviewed the work as "Das neue Werk" (The new work).
