= Cello Concerto (Waterhouse) =

- by Graham Waterhouse
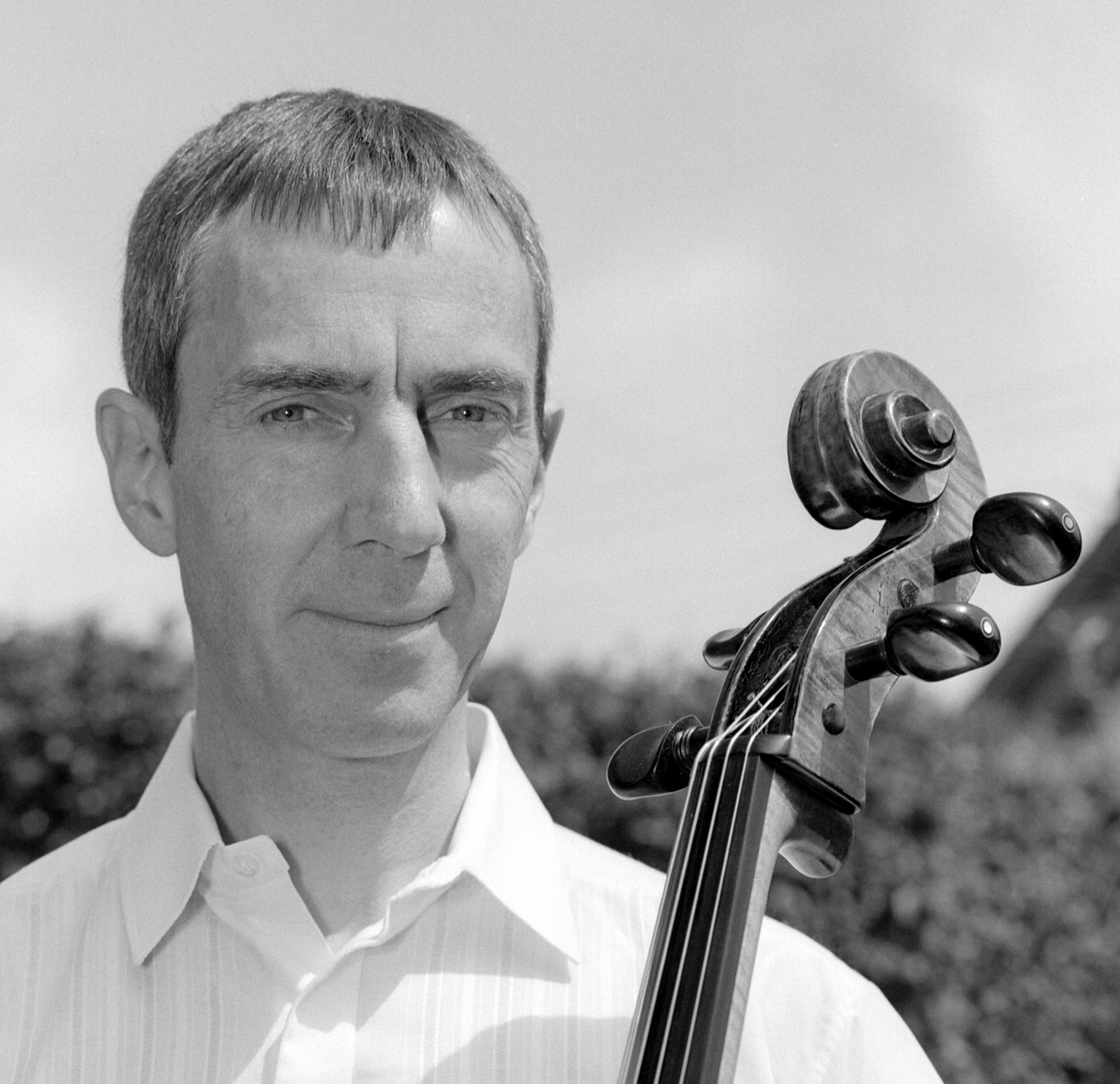
- Composer Graham Waterhouse, 2011
- Opus: 27, 27a
- Year: 1990; 1995 revised version; 2005 version with chamber orchestra
- Period: contemporary
- Performed: 1995
- Published: 2000 in Leipzig by Friedrich Hofmeister Musikverlag
- Movements: 3

The Cello Concerto, Op. 27, is a concerto for cello and orchestra by Graham Waterhouse, composed in 1990. It was first performed in 1995 in Toluca and Mexico City with the composer as the soloist, and published by Friedrich Hofmeister Musikverlag in Leipzig in 2000.

== History ==
The composer wrote a cello concerto in 1990 and played the solo part in the premiere in Yverdon, Switzerland, in June that year. He revised the work considerably, mentored by Siegfried Palm. He first performed the revised version in Toluca and Mexico City in June 1995 with the Orquesta Sinfónica del Estado de Mexico, conducted by Peter Robinson, along with Mozart's Symphony No. 38 and Stravinsky's Firebird Suite. The concerto was published by Friedrich Hofmeister Musikverlag in Leipzig in 2000. Waterhouse played the concerto also in Nizhny Novgorod, Weimar and Baden-Baden.

Hofmeister published a version for cello and piano, which has been performed also with cello and organ. A version for cello and chamber orchestra, Op. 27a, was first performed in Idstein on 5 August 2005 by the Rumänische Nationalphilharmonie Oltenia, conducted by Angela Gehann-Dernbach.

Waterhouse was the soloist of the first performance in the UK on 9 February 2008 at The Dome in Cambridge, played by The Orchestra on the Hill, the combined orchestra of colleges including Churchill where the composer studied Conductor Dominic Wyse also directed Bernstein's Chichester Psalms in that concert. He played the first performance in London, where he grew up, on 29 November 2015, with the North London Sinfonia.

== Music ==
The concerto is structured in three movements, after the model of solo concertos of the classical period:

1. Adagio – Allegro moderato
2. Andante tranquillo
3. Allegro con brio

The first movement has a slow introduction, with the soloist entering freely like in a cadenza over long chords of the winds. A dotted motif is first played by cellos and basses, connects introduction and the Allegro in sonata form, is part of the main theme and dominates as an ostinato part of the development. The second movement is in song form. A motif of a downward tritone appears in a theme played first by the oboe, also in the first entrance of the cello which resembles improvisation, and in the cello's following cantilena. The movement is subdued and shaped by solo wind lines. The last movement plays with the rondo form. An energetic first theme contrasts to a lyrical episode.

According to the publisher, the composer shared the musical material between the soloist and the orchestra as equal partners, with concertante parts especially for the winds. The duration is given as 30 minutes.
