= Rhapsodie Macabre =

Piano quintet by Graham Waterhouse

- Piano quintet by Graham Waterhouse
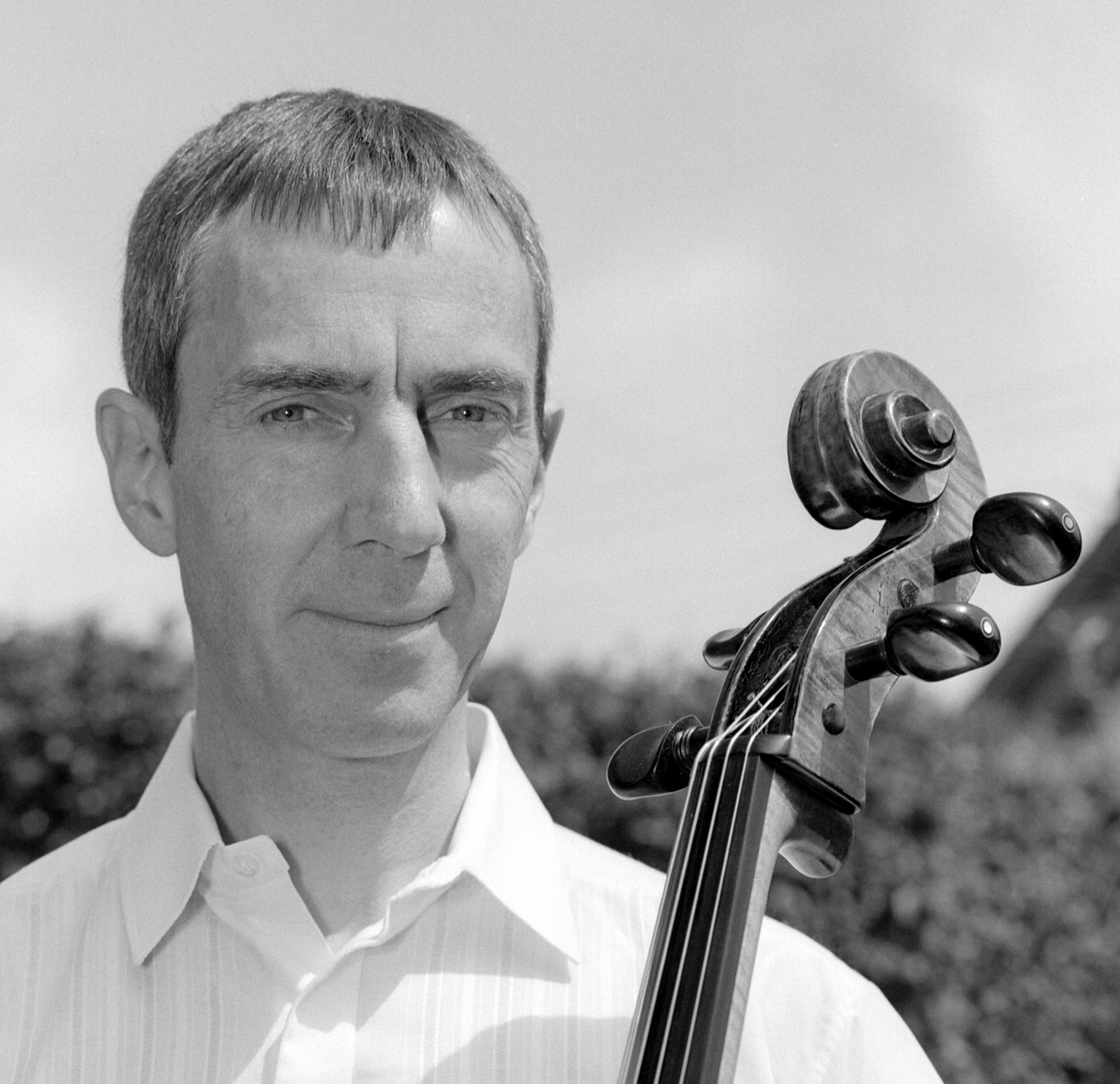
- The composer in 2011
- Year: 2011
- Period: contemporary
- Occasion: centenary of Franz Liszt
- Movements: 1 in 5 sections
- Scoring: piano, two violins, viola, cello

Rhapsodie Macabre is a composition for piano and string quartet in one movement by Graham Waterhouse, written in 2011 as a homage to Franz Liszt. It was first performed at a Liszt festival of the Gasteig, Munich, with the composer playing the cello part.

== History, structure and music ==
Waterhouse composed the work as the closing work of the 2011 Liszt Festival at the Gasteig, Munich, played in a concert of works by Liszt and Waterhouse. He combined elements of Liszt's music such as "virtuosic piano writing", "characteristic harmonic colour through the piling up of similar intervals", "timbre as a structural device, delineating form by extremes of high and low texture, as well as by the return of percussive elements" and "recurrence and transformation of idees fixes" themes, notably the Dies irae theme. The work developed to a "scaled down piano concerto", combining concertante elements for the piano with chamber music writing for the strings.

The work is in one movement, structured in five sections:

- Allegro alla toccata
- Presto precipitando
- Adagio lusingando
- Vivace
- Con moto giusto

The first section, like a toccata, is based on two themes, one of them the "Dies irae". In the second section, this theme "appears both in lyrical as well as in satirical guise". The third section introduces a cantabile line in the strings and leads to a dialogue of piano and first violin. The fourth section is a "demonic scherzo in 6/8 time". The finale combines the material of all previous sections and ends with a fast coda.

A review in the Süddeutsche Zeitung compares the music to a dreamlike ride through surreal territory, full of surprising events and turns. A reviewer in Das Orchester noted that the work has gestural moments ("gestische Momente)" and that it refers to music from the past, including the "Dies irae", discreetly woven in the texture. He described a theatrical danse macabre led by the first violin, using the tritone.

== Performances and recording ==
The premiere was played at the Liszt Festival 2011 of the Gasteig by pianist Valentina Babor, string players of the Münchner Philharmoniker Clément Courtin, Namiko Fuse and Konstantin Sellheim, and the composer as the cellist. The same ensemble played several concerts in the Munich area, for example on 20 March 2012 at the Hochschule für Musik München, combining works of Waterhouse, including Three Pieces for Solo Cello, with piano quartets of Beethoven. They performed the premiere in the UK on 9 October 2012 at Highgate School, London, the composer's former school, in a concert dedicated to works by Waterhouse. The reviewer termed the work a mini-piano concerto.

Rhapsodie Macabre is part of a CD Skylla und Charybdis of the composer's works for piano and strings. It was released in 2020 by Farao Classics, and introduced by a concert at the Munich Gasteig on 6 March 2021.
