= Richard Baker (composer) =

British composer and conductor

Baker's voice
recorded March 2015

Richard Baker (born 1972) is a British composer and conductor.

== Life ==
Richard Baker was a chorister in Lichfield Cathedral choir as a child. He read music at Exeter College, Oxford, and spent a year at the Royal Conservatory of The Hague studying under Louis Andriessen, before attending Royal Holloway, University of London, where he received his doctorate. In 2001 he was appointed New Music Fellow at Kettle's Yard, and became fellow-commoner at Trinity Hall, Cambridge, where he was Director of Music from 2005 to 2007. He is also Professor of Composition at the Guildhall School of Music and Drama.

== Work ==
Baker's notable compositions include 'Los Rábanos' (1998), 'Learning to Fly' (1999) and 'The Tyranny of Fun' (2012). As a conductor he works regularly with leading composers and ensembles such as BBC Scottish Symphony Orchestra, BBC National Orchestra of Wales, London Sinfonietta, BCMG, Britten Sinfonia, Composers Ensemble.
