= Gasteig HP8 =

German culture centre

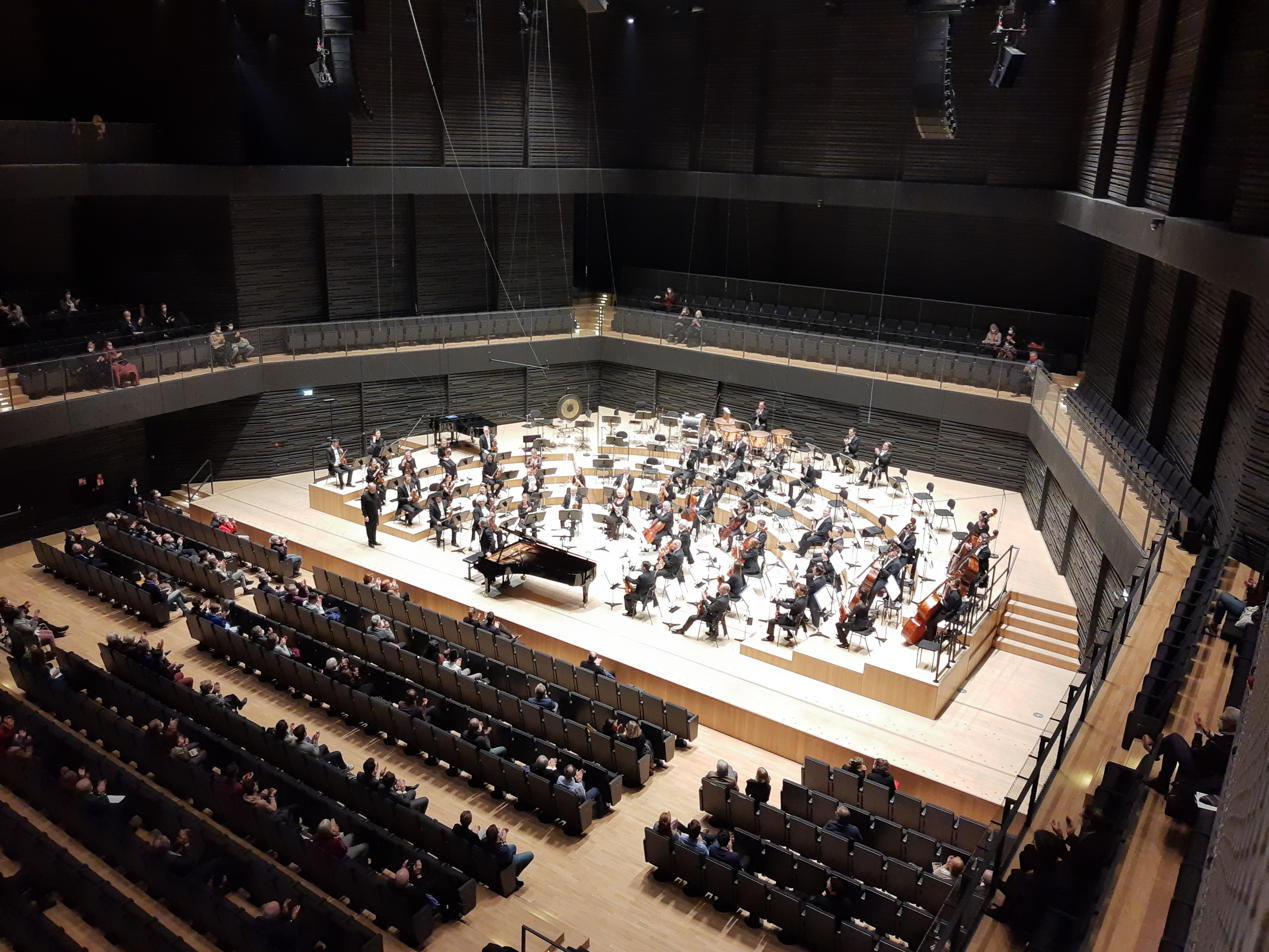
- Isarphilharmonie
- Interactive map of the Gasteig HP8 area

General information
- Type: Cultural centre
- Location: Munich-Sendling, Hans-Preißinger-Straße 8, Germany
- Coordinates: 48°6′41″N 11°33′13″E
- Completed: 2021
- Opened: 8 October 2021

Design and construction
- Architecture firm: Gerkan, Marg und Partner

Other information
- Seating capacity: 1,800 (Isarphilharmonie)

Website
- gasteig.de

Gasteig HP8 is a culture centre in Munich, Bavaria, Germany, in the Sendling district. It is a provisional location, replacing the functions of the Gasteig in Haidhausen while it is under reconstruction planned to be completed in 2034. Gasteig HP8 opened on 8 October 2021. It houses the Isarphilharmonie concert hall and the Münchner Stadtbibliothek library in Hall E, a listed historic monument.

== History ==
Gasteig HP8 was built as a provisional home for the institutions housed at the Gasteig in Haidhausen while it undergoes major reconstruction. Gasteig HP8 was opened on 8 October 2021. It houses the Isarphilharmonie concert hall and the Münchner Stadtbibliothek in Hall E, a listed historic monument. Other institutions planned to move temporarily are the Münchner Philharmoniker, the Münchner Volkshochschule, and the Hochschule für Musik und Theater München. The name was found by a competition, and is short for the address Hans-Preißinger-Straße 8.

== Venues ==
=== Isarphilharmonie ===
The concert hall Isarphilharmonie was designed by architects Gerkan, Marg und Partner. It was realised by the Swiss Nussli Group. The acoustic was designed by Yasuhisa Toyota and his office Nagata Acoustics. The large hall seats around 1800 people. It serves the Münchner Philharmoniker, the Symphonieorchester des Bayerischen Rundfunks and other orchestras. It is a steel construction of a volume of almost 60.000 Kubikmeter. The walls are made from prefabricated dark wood elements. The seats are also dark, in wood and textiles, and contrast to the stage floor in light-coloured wood. The stage is c. 272 m^{2}. The new building includes the former Trafohalle.

=== Hall E ===
The hall, a protected historic monument, serves as a foyer for the Isarphilharmonie, with gastronomy, and houses Münchner Stadtbibliothek, focused on music, languages and life-long learning. The hall is open daily from 7am to 11pm.
