= Christopher White (pianist) =

English pianist, musicologist and repetiteur

- Born: 1984 (age 41–42)
- Occupations: Classical pianist; Repetiteur; Musicologist

Christopher White (born 1984) is an English classical pianist, musicologist and repetiteur. He plays internationally, not only the standard classical and romantic repertory, but also premieres of new music. He made a transcription of four movements of Mahler's unfinished Tenth Symphony for piano, playing and recording the work.

== Career ==
White studied at the Royal Academy of Music, graduating in 2007. He studied piano with Hamish Milne and Nicholas Walker, and piano accompaniment with Michael Dussek.

White played piano concertos by Beethoven, Brahms, and Rachmaninow with the Orchestra of the City in London. He played the Piano Concerto No. 2 in G minor by Camille Saint-Saëns at the Philharmonie Berlin in 2016.

White premiered new music. On 17 July 2003, he played the first performance of Blue Medusa by John Casken, a piece for bassoon and piano commissioned by Rosemary Burton's parents for her birthday. With the same bassoonist, he played in 2009 Phoenix Arising, written by Graham Waterhouse in memory of his father, the bassoonist William Waterhouse.

In opera, White worked as repetiteur and conductor, including at the Frankfurt Opera and the English National Opera. He was a Piano Fellow at the Tanglewood Music Centre in Massachusetts, assisting James Levine for Kurt Weill's Mahagonny, also appearing onstage as the pianist. He was solo repetiteur at the Deutsche Oper Berlin in 2014 and has since been promoted to Stellvertretender Studienleiter (Deputy Director of Musical Studies).

He arranged movements two to five of Gustav Mahler's unfinished Tenth Symphony for piano, based on Deryck Cooke's performing version. In 2008, he made a recording, using the arrangement of the first movement by Ronald Stevenson which is also based on Cooke. The recording was taken at Rosslyn Hill Unitarian Chapel, Hampstead, and released in 2010. Christopher Abbot summarized in The Fanfare in a detailed review: "His transcription is not merely evidence of a familiarity with the Mahlerian idiom; it is infused with a profound understanding of the importance of this work in the larger context of Mahler's symphonic journey." White played the transcription for the Gustav Mahler Society UK in London on 17 January 2010.
