= Three Pieces for Solo Cello =

Composition for cello by Graham Waterhouse

- by Graham Waterhouse
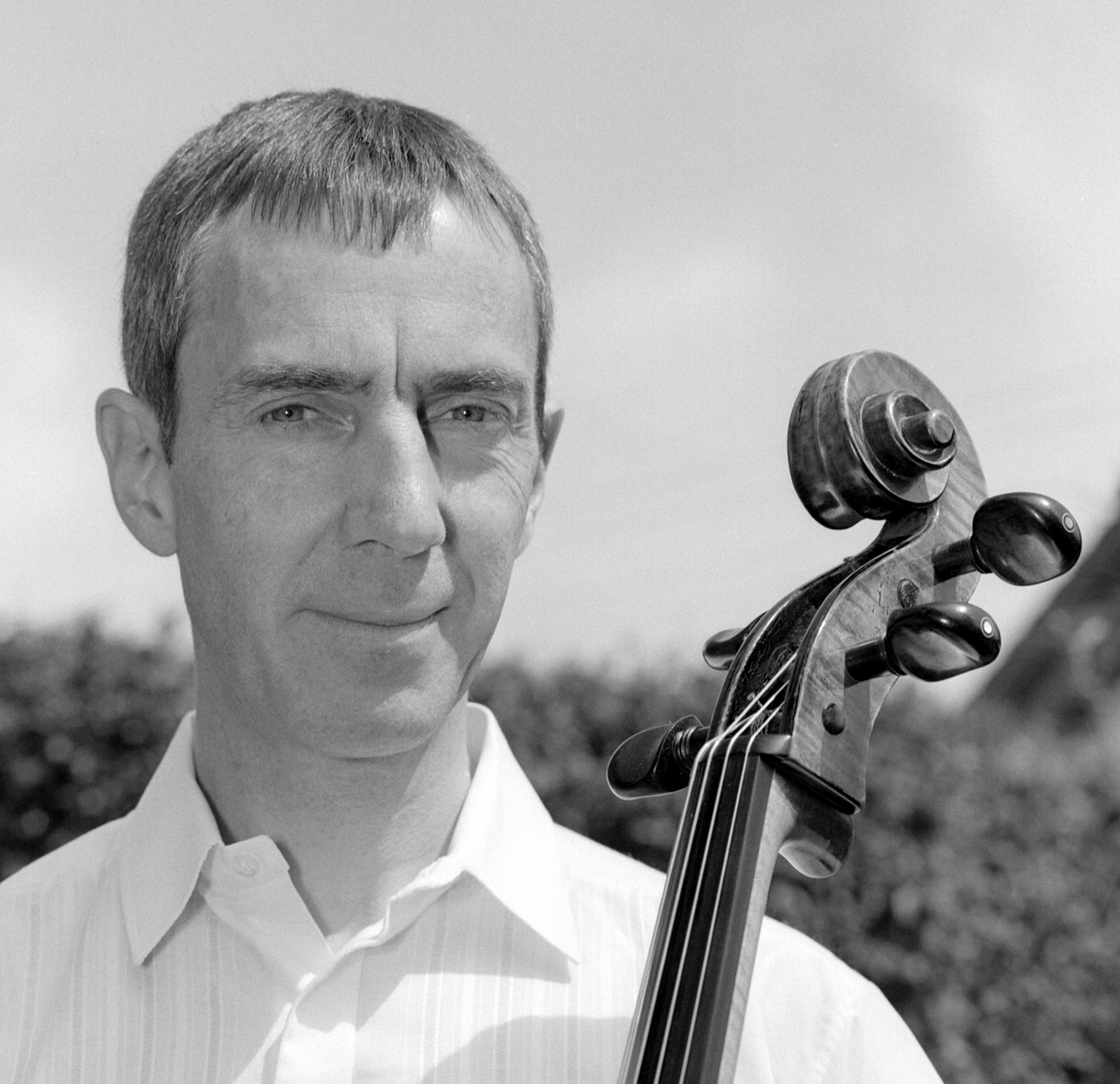
- Composer Graham Waterhouse, 2011
- Opus: 28
- Year: 1992
- Period: contemporary
- Published: 1996: Leipzig Hofmeister
- Movements: 3
- Scoring: cello

Three Pieces for Solo Cello op. 28, is a composition for cello in three movements by Graham Waterhouse, dedicated to cellist Siegfried Palm in 1992. The composer, a cellist himself, wrote it to "exploit the characteristics" of his instrument. In 1996, a revised version won a composition prize and was performed at the Hochschule für Musik München. The work was published by the Friedrich Hofmeister Musikverlag in 1996 and recorded on a Portrait CD of chamber music in 2001.

== History ==
Waterhouse composed the work after his Cello Concerto op. 27. Inspired by Siegfried Palm, he explores the possibilities of the instrument on a more intimate scale. In 1992, the composer performed a first version as part of a master class by Palm at the Haus Marteau in Lichtenberg. In 1996, a revised version won third prize at a composers' competition of the Münchener Tonkünstlerverband (Munich Association of Sound Artists). It was performed by the composer in a ceremony at the Hochschule für Musik und Theater München on 29 September 1996. It was published the same year by the Friedrich Hofmeister Musikverlag, who gave the duration as 10 minutes.

== Movements and music ==
1. Monologue (Moderato assai e risoluto)
2. Chase (Maestoso-Vivace)
3. Recitative (Adagio e rubato e molto espressivo)

The publisher summarized: "The pieces attempt to exploit the main characteristics of the instrument – its wide spectrum of expression, its extensive range and its variety of timbres. In the second movement sul ponticello plays a structural role and in the third the bell-like left-hand pizzicati." The composer points out: "Writing for and performing on one's own instrument reminds one of an actor on stage delivering a soliloquy. One is alone with the instrument and with the musical material – entirely without the support of harmonic or textural backgrounds of piano or orchestra." Hans Krieger mentions in his liner notes for the recording the pieces' "depth of expression", "rhapsodic gestures" and "a world of meditation".

== Recording ==
The work was recorded on a Portrait CD by Cybele in 2001, played by the composer, along with chamber music for recorder, clarinet and piano, including Gestural Variations. Hubert Culot wrote in his review: "one of the most substantial pieces in this selection is the Three Pieces for Solo Cello Op.28 completed in 1996 and dedicated to Siegfried Palm. A short, vivacious and often whimsical Scherzo of considerable virtuosity is framed by two weightier, mostly slow and rhapsodic movements of great expressive strength exploiting the full expressive range of the cello."
