= Robert Lienau =

German music publisher (1838–1920)

- Born: Robert Emil Lienau; 28 December 1838; Neustadt in Holstein, Germany
- Died: 22 July 1920 (aged 81)
- Occupation: Music publisher

Robert Emil Lienau (28 December 1838 – 22 July 1920) was a prolific German music publisher.

Lienau was born in Neustadt in Holstein and entered the publishing firm of Adolf Martin Schlesinger in Berlin in 1863. In the following year he acquired the firm, initially merely adding his own name to Schlesinger's.

The firm Robert Lienau issued the works of leading composers such as Anton Bruckner, Jean Sibelius, Leopold Godowsky and Alban Berg. In 1875 he also acquired the Vienna-based publishing company Haslinger, originally founded by Tobias Haslinger, which also brought many works by Beethoven, Liszt, Spohr, Hummel, and Johann Strauss senior and junior into the business.

Robert Lienau withdrew from the management of the company in 1898 (he died in 1920 in Neustadt in Holstein) and inherited it to his son Robert Heinrich Lienau (1866–1949), whose lobbying on the issue of musical copyright influenced the new copyright laws of the German Reich of 1901. From 1910 the company was managed by Robert Heinrich and his brother Friedrich Wilhelm Lienau (1876–1973), but they separated in 1938, with the younger brother taking over responsibility for the Haslinger business in Vienna and the elder remaining in Berlin.

Following the death of Hugo Bock in 1932, Lienau also took over Bote & Bock in 1935. Following Robert Heinrich Lienau's death in 1949 the company was managed by his children. It was sold in 1990 to the publisher Zimmermann in Frankfurt am Main.
