= Piccolo Quintet =

Quintet op. 26 of Graham Waterhouse

- by Graham Waterhouse
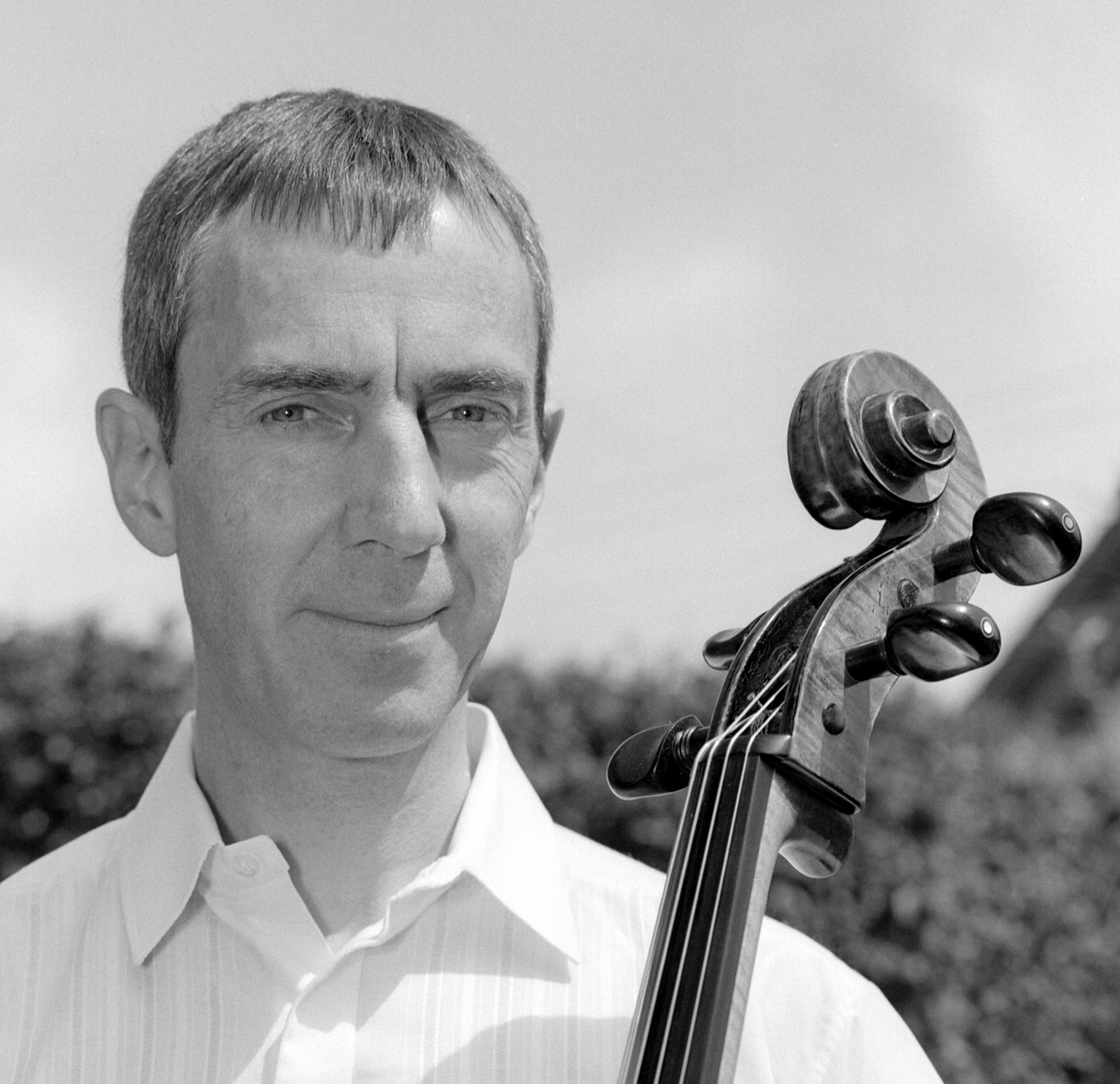
- Composer Graham Waterhouse, 2011
- Year: 1989
- Period: contemporary
- Form: quintet
- Published: 2002: Frankfurt Zimmermann
- Movements: 1
- Scoring: piccolo, two violins, viola, cello

Piccolo Quintet is short for the Quintet op. 26 of Graham Waterhouse, composed in 1989 for piccolo and string quartet and published by Zimmermann in 2002 as Quintet for piccolo, 2 violins, viola and violoncello.

== History ==
In 1989 the composer Graham Waterhouse was a cellist of the orchestra of the Schleswig-Holstein Musik Festival, conducted by Sergiu Celibidache. The piccolo player of the orchestra suggested a quintet composition, Celibidache influenced the work. The quintet in one movement of about 16 minutes is in sonata form, framed by a slow introduction which reappears toward the end. A virtuoso coda concludes the work. The sound of the piccolo is combined with the strings similar to wind instrument and strings in clarinet quintets. The Quintet was first performed on 1 January 1990 in a private concert in London.

In 2002 the Quintet was published by Zimmermann. It was performed in Munich at the 1. Sergiu Celibidache Festival on 13 October 2002 in a lecture concert, showing the influence of Celibidache on the composition. The performers were Katharina Kutnewsky, Daniel Nodel, Anja Traub, Gunter Pretzel and Graham Waterhouse. The first performance in the UK was on 5 November 2002 in a composer portrait concert in St. Cyprian's Church, London, marking the 40th birthday of the composer. Monica McCarron played the piccolo with the Tippett String Quartet. The concert was also the premiere in the UK of the trio Gestural Variations.

On 5 October 2003 the Quintet was performed in a composer portrait concert in the Kleiner Konzertsaal of the Gasteig, Munich. Yaron Traub conducted music for one to ten players. The concert was the premiere of the composer's Bassoon Quintet. Ulrich Biersack played piccolo, Lyndon Watts bassoon, the string quartet for both works was formed by Odette Couch, Kirsty Hilton, Isabel Charisius and the composer.

Piccolo Quintet was recorded in 2007 by Gudrun Hinze and other members of the Gewandhausorchester Leipzig on a CD piccolo concert, together with Allan Stephenson's Concertino for piccolo, strings and harpsichord, Mike Mower's Sonata for piccolo and piano, Vivaldi's Concerto for flautino in C major, RV 443, and Erwin Schulhoff's Concertino for flute, viola and double Bass.
