= List of minor planets: 434001–435000 =

The following is a partial list of minor planets, running from minor-planet number 434001 through 435000, inclusive. The primary data for this and other partial lists is based on JPL's "Small-Body Orbital Elements" and data available from the Minor Planet Center. Critical list information is also provided by the MPC, unless otherwise specified from Lowell Observatory. A detailed description of the table's columns and additional sources are given on the main page including a complete list of every page in this series, and a statistical break-up on the dynamical classification of minor planets.

Also see the summary list of all named bodies in numerical and alphabetical order, and the corresponding naming citations for the number range of this particular list. New namings may only be added to this list after official publication, as the preannouncement of names is condemned by the Working Group for Small Bodies Nomenclature of the International Astronomical Union.

Near-Earth obj.	MBA (inner)	MBA (outer)	Centaur
Mars-crosser	MBA (middle)	Jupiter trojan	Trans-Neptunian obj.
Unclassified

== 434001–434100 ==
Designation			Discovery			Properties		Ref
Permanent	Provisional	Named after	Date	Site	Discoverer(s)	Category	Diam.	Ref
434001	2000 SQ_{296}	—	September 28, 2000	Socorro	LINEAR	·	3.9 km	MPC · JPL
434002	2000 SM_{320}	—	September 29, 2000	Kitt Peak	Spacewatch	·	1.9 km	MPC · JPL
434003	2000 SP_{372}	—	September 26, 2000	Apache Point	SDSS	·	720 m	MPC · JPL
434004	2000 SM_{374}	—	September 26, 2000	Apache Point	SDSS	EOS	2.0 km	MPC · JPL
434005	2000 TD_{33}	—	October 4, 2000	Socorro	LINEAR	·	4.7 km	MPC · JPL
434006	2000 UJ_{51}	—	October 24, 2000	Socorro	LINEAR	·	1.6 km	MPC · JPL
434007	2000 VH_{61}	—	November 1, 2000	Kitt Peak	Spacewatch	AMO	690 m	MPC · JPL
434008	2000 WY_{2}	—	November 19, 2000	Socorro	LINEAR	H	790 m	MPC · JPL
434009	2000 WB_{132}	—	November 17, 2000	Kitt Peak	Spacewatch	T_{j} (2.98) · 3:2	7.5 km	MPC · JPL
434010	2000 XB_{14}	—	December 4, 2000	Bohyunsan	Jeon, Y.-B., Lee, B.-C.	·	1.0 km	MPC · JPL
434011	2000 YU_{140}	—	December 19, 2000	Kitt Peak	Deep Lens Survey	·	2.0 km	MPC · JPL
434012	2001 FE_{120}	—	March 28, 2001	Kitt Peak	Spacewatch	·	930 m	MPC · JPL
434013	2001 PF_{20}	—	August 10, 2001	Palomar	NEAT	·	900 m	MPC · JPL
434014	2001 QV_{105}	—	August 18, 2001	Anderson Mesa	LONEOS	(194)	1.3 km	MPC · JPL
434015	2001 QK_{167}	—	August 24, 2001	Haleakala	NEAT	V	760 m	MPC · JPL
434016	2001 QC_{262}	—	August 25, 2001	Socorro	LINEAR	·	1.3 km	MPC · JPL
434017	2001 QP_{329}	—	August 23, 2001	Anderson Mesa	LONEOS	NYS	1.2 km	MPC · JPL
434018	2001 QP_{330}	—	August 27, 2001	Anderson Mesa	LONEOS	NYS	1.0 km	MPC · JPL
434019	2001 RG_{9}	—	September 8, 2001	Socorro	LINEAR	·	1.2 km	MPC · JPL
434020	2001 RG_{142}	—	September 10, 2001	Socorro	LINEAR	H	530 m	MPC · JPL
434021	2001 SY_{3}	—	September 16, 2001	Socorro	LINEAR	·	1.7 km	MPC · JPL
434022	2001 SK_{8}	—	September 12, 2001	Kitt Peak	Spacewatch	·	1.2 km	MPC · JPL
434023	2001 ST_{53}	—	September 16, 2001	Socorro	LINEAR	·	3.1 km	MPC · JPL
434024	2001 SL_{76}	—	September 16, 2001	Socorro	LINEAR	·	1.2 km	MPC · JPL
434025	2001 SQ_{142}	—	September 16, 2001	Socorro	LINEAR	·	1.4 km	MPC · JPL
434026	2001 SJ_{143}	—	September 16, 2001	Socorro	LINEAR	·	1.2 km	MPC · JPL
434027	2001 SB_{144}	—	September 16, 2001	Socorro	LINEAR	·	2.0 km	MPC · JPL
434028	2001 SG_{182}	—	August 28, 2001	Palomar	NEAT	·	1.2 km	MPC · JPL
434029	2001 SN_{182}	—	September 19, 2001	Socorro	LINEAR	·	1.0 km	MPC · JPL
434030	2001 SF_{183}	—	September 19, 2001	Socorro	LINEAR	·	930 m	MPC · JPL
434031	2001 SW_{197}	—	August 25, 2001	Kitt Peak	Spacewatch	·	950 m	MPC · JPL
434032	2001 SS_{208}	—	September 19, 2001	Socorro	LINEAR	·	2.5 km	MPC · JPL
434033	2001 SD_{222}	—	September 19, 2001	Socorro	LINEAR	·	2.1 km	MPC · JPL
434034	2001 SS_{222}	—	September 19, 2001	Socorro	LINEAR	·	2.0 km	MPC · JPL
434035	2001 SE_{228}	—	September 19, 2001	Socorro	LINEAR	·	1.3 km	MPC · JPL
434036	2001 SM_{236}	—	September 19, 2001	Socorro	LINEAR	(5)	950 m	MPC · JPL
434037	2001 SL_{248}	—	September 19, 2001	Socorro	LINEAR	·	2.7 km	MPC · JPL
434038	2001 SG_{249}	—	September 19, 2001	Socorro	LINEAR	·	2.1 km	MPC · JPL
434039	2001 SO_{284}	—	September 12, 2001	Kitt Peak	Spacewatch	·	2.5 km	MPC · JPL
434040	2001 SL_{309}	—	September 19, 2001	Kitt Peak	Spacewatch	MAS	630 m	MPC · JPL
434041	2001 SB_{329}	—	September 19, 2001	Socorro	LINEAR	NYS	1.1 km	MPC · JPL
434042	2001 TL_{25}	—	October 14, 2001	Socorro	LINEAR	·	3.3 km	MPC · JPL
434043	2001 TC_{57}	—	October 13, 2001	Socorro	LINEAR	NYS	1.3 km	MPC · JPL
434044	2001 TC_{93}	—	October 14, 2001	Socorro	LINEAR	·	1.5 km	MPC · JPL
434045	2001 TV_{158}	—	September 20, 2001	Socorro	LINEAR	·	1.2 km	MPC · JPL
434046	2001 TJ_{183}	—	October 14, 2001	Socorro	LINEAR	·	1.5 km	MPC · JPL
434047	2001 TT_{212}	—	October 13, 2001	Palomar	NEAT	·	1.3 km	MPC · JPL
434048	2001 TV_{234}	—	October 15, 2001	Kitt Peak	Spacewatch	·	2.6 km	MPC · JPL
434049	2001 TK_{241}	—	October 9, 2001	Kitt Peak	Spacewatch	·	3.2 km	MPC · JPL
434050 Törökfece	2001 TU_{257}	Törökfece	October 10, 2001	Palomar	NEAT	·	1.2 km	MPC · JPL
434051	2001 UW_{16}	—	October 24, 2001	Palomar	NEAT	AMO	390 m	MPC · JPL
434052	2001 UP_{17}	—	October 24, 2001	Socorro	LINEAR	·	1.4 km	MPC · JPL
434053	2001 UP_{27}	—	October 28, 2001	Palomar	NEAT	AMO	250 m	MPC · JPL
434054	2001 UR_{43}	—	October 17, 2001	Socorro	LINEAR	·	1.6 km	MPC · JPL
434055	2001 UY_{52}	—	October 17, 2001	Socorro	LINEAR	·	3.3 km	MPC · JPL
434056	2001 UK_{67}	—	October 20, 2001	Socorro	LINEAR	·	1.7 km	MPC · JPL
434057	2001 UN_{144}	—	October 23, 2001	Socorro	LINEAR	PHO	1.1 km	MPC · JPL
434058	2001 UE_{156}	—	October 23, 2001	Socorro	LINEAR	·	3.1 km	MPC · JPL
434059	2001 UA_{221}	—	October 21, 2001	Socorro	LINEAR	EOS	2.0 km	MPC · JPL
434060	2001 UB_{224}	—	October 18, 2001	Palomar	NEAT	MAS	670 m	MPC · JPL
434061	2001 UY_{224}	—	October 23, 2001	Socorro	LINEAR	·	1.5 km	MPC · JPL
434062	2001 VR_{2}	—	November 9, 2001	Socorro	LINEAR	H	460 m	MPC · JPL
434063	2001 VC_{65}	—	November 10, 2001	Socorro	LINEAR	·	1.4 km	MPC · JPL
434064	2001 VX_{71}	—	November 12, 2001	Emerald Lane	L. Ball	·	2.3 km	MPC · JPL
434065	2001 WJ_{30}	—	November 17, 2001	Socorro	LINEAR	·	3.4 km	MPC · JPL
434066	2001 WO_{51}	—	November 19, 2001	Socorro	LINEAR	MAS	800 m	MPC · JPL
434067	2001 WV_{52}	—	November 19, 2001	Socorro	LINEAR	EOS	1.9 km	MPC · JPL
434068	2001 WF_{69}	—	November 9, 2001	Socorro	LINEAR	·	3.8 km	MPC · JPL
434069	2001 WF_{78}	—	November 20, 2001	Socorro	LINEAR	·	2.4 km	MPC · JPL
434070	2001 XM_{5}	—	December 5, 2001	Haleakala	NEAT	·	3.6 km	MPC · JPL
434071	2001 XO_{133}	—	December 14, 2001	Socorro	LINEAR	·	3.3 km	MPC · JPL
434072	2001 XE_{138}	—	December 14, 2001	Socorro	LINEAR	·	1.1 km	MPC · JPL
434073	2001 XB_{202}	—	December 14, 2001	Kitt Peak	Spacewatch	·	1.4 km	MPC · JPL
434074	2001 XK_{206}	—	November 17, 2001	Socorro	LINEAR	·	3.3 km	MPC · JPL
434075	2001 XY_{223}	—	November 19, 2001	Socorro	LINEAR	·	3.3 km	MPC · JPL
434076	2001 XU_{252}	—	December 14, 2001	Socorro	LINEAR	·	1.4 km	MPC · JPL
434077	2001 YN_{1}	—	December 18, 2001	Socorro	LINEAR	·	1.5 km	MPC · JPL
434078	2001 YB_{15}	—	December 17, 2001	Socorro	LINEAR	·	3.5 km	MPC · JPL
434079	2001 YK_{153}	—	December 19, 2001	Anderson Mesa	LONEOS	·	1.9 km	MPC · JPL
434080	2002 AE_{2}	—	January 7, 2002	Haleakala	NEAT	·	2.2 km	MPC · JPL
434081	2002 AQ_{158}	—	January 13, 2002	Socorro	LINEAR	(5)	1.4 km	MPC · JPL
434082	2002 BP_{20}	—	January 19, 2002	Anderson Mesa	LONEOS	H	620 m	MPC · JPL
434083	2002 CK	—	February 6, 2002	Socorro	LINEAR	·	1.8 km	MPC · JPL
434084	2002 CA_{19}	—	February 6, 2002	Siding Spring	R. H. McNaught	·	1.4 km	MPC · JPL
434085	2002 CD_{29}	—	February 6, 2002	Socorro	LINEAR	·	1.3 km	MPC · JPL
434086	2002 CC_{59}	—	February 13, 2002	Socorro	LINEAR	·	2.8 km	MPC · JPL
434087	2002 CV_{69}	—	February 7, 2002	Socorro	LINEAR	·	1.1 km	MPC · JPL
434088	2002 CV_{72}	—	February 7, 2002	Socorro	LINEAR	·	2.1 km	MPC · JPL
434089	2002 CO_{162}	—	February 8, 2002	Socorro	LINEAR	·	1.7 km	MPC · JPL
434090	2002 CF_{217}	—	February 10, 2002	Socorro	LINEAR	·	1.7 km	MPC · JPL
434091	2002 CJ_{258}	—	February 6, 2002	Kitt Peak	M. W. Buie	·	910 m	MPC · JPL
434092	2002 EE_{9}	—	March 13, 2002	Palomar	NEAT	·	1.7 km	MPC · JPL
434093	2002 EP_{37}	—	March 9, 2002	Kitt Peak	Spacewatch	·	1.1 km	MPC · JPL
434094	2002 EP_{57}	—	March 13, 2002	Socorro	LINEAR	·	1.5 km	MPC · JPL
434095	2002 FB_{25}	—	March 19, 2002	Palomar	NEAT	·	1.5 km	MPC · JPL
434096	2002 GO_{5}	—	April 11, 2002	Socorro	LINEAR	APO +1km · PHA	530 m	MPC · JPL
434097	2002 GT_{33}	—	April 1, 2002	Palomar	NEAT	·	2.1 km	MPC · JPL
434098	2002 GC_{71}	—	April 9, 2002	Kitt Peak	Spacewatch	·	1.6 km	MPC · JPL
434099	2002 GK_{89}	—	April 8, 2002	Palomar	NEAT	H	420 m	MPC · JPL
434100	2002 GQ_{119}	—	April 12, 2002	Palomar	NEAT	·	1.4 km	MPC · JPL

== 434101–434200 ==
back to top

Designation			Discovery			Properties		Ref
Permanent	Provisional	Named after	Date	Site	Discoverer(s)	Category	Diam.	Ref
434101	2002 JB_{14}	—	May 7, 2002	Palomar	NEAT	·	840 m	MPC · JPL
434102	2002 JY_{100}	—	May 15, 2002	Palomar	NEAT	H	580 m	MPC · JPL
434103	2002 JP_{117}	—	May 4, 2002	Anderson Mesa	LONEOS	·	1.8 km	MPC · JPL
434104	2002 LM_{5}	—	June 5, 2002	Palomar	NEAT	·	2.0 km	MPC · JPL
434105	2002 NZ_{1}	—	July 5, 2002	Kitt Peak	Spacewatch	H	620 m	MPC · JPL
434106	2002 NU_{57}	—	July 12, 2002	Palomar	NEAT	·	1.4 km	MPC · JPL
434107	2002 NK_{63}	—	July 9, 2002	Palomar	NEAT	·	1.6 km	MPC · JPL
434108	2002 NN_{65}	—	July 15, 2002	Palomar	NEAT	·	650 m	MPC · JPL
434109	2002 OW_{13}	—	July 18, 2002	Socorro	LINEAR	JUN	950 m	MPC · JPL
434110	2002 OX_{22}	—	July 31, 2002	Socorro	LINEAR	·	2.8 km	MPC · JPL
434111	2002 OJ_{33}	—	July 18, 2002	Palomar	NEAT	·	450 m	MPC · JPL
434112	2002 PQ_{5}	—	August 4, 2002	Palomar	NEAT	DOR	2.4 km	MPC · JPL
434113	2002 PV_{68}	—	August 11, 2002	Socorro	LINEAR	·	1.0 km	MPC · JPL
434114	2002 PA_{103}	—	August 12, 2002	Socorro	LINEAR	·	3.4 km	MPC · JPL
434115	2002 PW_{104}	—	August 12, 2002	Socorro	LINEAR	·	1.8 km	MPC · JPL
434116	2002 PZ_{138}	—	August 12, 2002	Socorro	LINEAR	·	1.8 km	MPC · JPL
434117	2002 PL_{140}	—	August 14, 2002	Socorro	LINEAR	·	2.0 km	MPC · JPL
434118	2002 PD_{166}	—	August 8, 2002	Palomar	Lowe, A.	·	480 m	MPC · JPL
434119	2002 PA_{173}	—	October 15, 1995	Kitt Peak	Spacewatch	3:2	5.0 km	MPC · JPL
434120	2002 PS_{181}	—	August 15, 2002	Palomar	NEAT	·	1.7 km	MPC · JPL
434121	2002 PK_{190}	—	August 8, 2002	Palomar	NEAT	·	1.6 km	MPC · JPL
434122	2002 QT_{6}	—	August 20, 2002	Kvistaberg	Uppsala-DLR Asteroid Survey	PHO	1.2 km	MPC · JPL
434123	2002 QB_{39}	—	August 30, 2002	Kitt Peak	Spacewatch	·	690 m	MPC · JPL
434124	2002 QD_{52}	—	August 29, 2002	Palomar	S. F. Hönig	·	1.7 km	MPC · JPL
434125	2002 QA_{53}	—	August 29, 2002	Palomar	S. F. Hönig	·	690 m	MPC · JPL
434126	2002 QP_{56}	—	August 16, 2002	Palomar	Lowe, A.	H	570 m	MPC · JPL
434127	2002 QF_{57}	—	August 29, 2002	Palomar	S. F. Hönig	·	870 m	MPC · JPL
434128	2002 QR_{60}	—	August 19, 2002	Palomar	NEAT	·	800 m	MPC · JPL
434129	2002 QX_{62}	—	August 17, 2002	Palomar	NEAT	·	2.1 km	MPC · JPL
434130	2002 QS_{81}	—	August 30, 2002	Palomar	NEAT	·	1.7 km	MPC · JPL
434131	2002 QK_{90}	—	August 30, 2002	Palomar	NEAT	·	2.2 km	MPC · JPL
434132	2002 QH_{95}	—	August 18, 2002	Palomar	NEAT	·	1.8 km	MPC · JPL
434133	2002 QV_{102}	—	August 28, 2002	Palomar	Palomar	·	2.0 km	MPC · JPL
434134	2002 QJ_{111}	—	August 17, 2002	Palomar	NEAT	DOR	2.3 km	MPC · JPL
434135	2002 QN_{124}	—	August 16, 2002	Palomar	NEAT	·	1.6 km	MPC · JPL
434136	2002 QO_{131}	—	August 30, 2002	Palomar	NEAT	·	640 m	MPC · JPL
434137	2002 QL_{132}	—	August 17, 2002	Palomar	NEAT	BAP	790 m	MPC · JPL
434138	2002 RW_{1}	—	August 12, 2002	Socorro	LINEAR	·	1.6 km	MPC · JPL
434139	2002 RK_{7}	—	September 3, 2002	Needville	J. Dellinger	·	690 m	MPC · JPL
434140	2002 RJ_{37}	—	September 5, 2002	Socorro	LINEAR	·	770 m	MPC · JPL
434141	2002 RX_{54}	—	September 5, 2002	Anderson Mesa	LONEOS	·	1.4 km	MPC · JPL
434142	2002 RA_{76}	—	September 5, 2002	Socorro	LINEAR	·	630 m	MPC · JPL
434143	2002 RO_{83}	—	September 5, 2002	Socorro	LINEAR	·	720 m	MPC · JPL
434144	2002 RL_{98}	—	September 5, 2002	Socorro	LINEAR	·	2.4 km	MPC · JPL
434145	2002 RG_{151}	—	September 12, 2002	Palomar	NEAT	·	950 m	MPC · JPL
434146	2002 RH_{153}	—	September 12, 2002	Palomar	NEAT	·	2.6 km	MPC · JPL
434147	2002 RH_{156}	—	September 11, 2002	Palomar	NEAT	·	610 m	MPC · JPL
434148	2002 RK_{176}	—	September 13, 2002	Palomar	NEAT	·	2.2 km	MPC · JPL
434149	2002 RA_{180}	—	September 14, 2002	Kitt Peak	Spacewatch	·	1.7 km	MPC · JPL
434150	2002 RU_{198}	—	September 13, 2002	Palomar	NEAT	·	650 m	MPC · JPL
434151	2002 RA_{203}	—	September 13, 2002	Palomar	NEAT	V	680 m	MPC · JPL
434152	2002 RN_{280}	—	September 14, 2002	Palomar	NEAT	(2076)	970 m	MPC · JPL
434153	2002 RF_{281}	—	September 14, 2002	Palomar	NEAT	AEO	1.2 km	MPC · JPL
434154	2002 SL	—	September 16, 2002	Haleakala	NEAT	AMO	390 m	MPC · JPL
434155	2002 SN_{7}	—	September 27, 2002	Palomar	NEAT	·	1.8 km	MPC · JPL
434156	2002 SX_{14}	—	September 27, 2002	Palomar	NEAT	·	2.4 km	MPC · JPL
434157	2002 SR_{17}	—	September 26, 2002	Palomar	NEAT	·	680 m	MPC · JPL
434158	2002 SP_{64}	—	September 16, 2002	Palomar	NEAT	·	830 m	MPC · JPL
434159	2002 SZ_{68}	—	September 26, 2002	Palomar	NEAT	·	580 m	MPC · JPL
434160	2002 TM_{9}	—	October 1, 2002	Anderson Mesa	LONEOS	(2076)	720 m	MPC · JPL
434161	2002 TU_{9}	—	October 1, 2002	Anderson Mesa	LONEOS	·	2.1 km	MPC · JPL
434162	2002 TW_{37}	—	October 2, 2002	Socorro	LINEAR	·	2.2 km	MPC · JPL
434163	2002 TZ_{38}	—	October 2, 2002	Socorro	LINEAR	·	810 m	MPC · JPL
434164	2002 TS_{42}	—	October 2, 2002	Socorro	LINEAR	·	1.1 km	MPC · JPL
434165	2002 TP_{51}	—	October 2, 2002	Socorro	LINEAR	·	790 m	MPC · JPL
434166	2002 TT_{63}	—	October 4, 2002	Campo Imperatore	CINEOS	·	790 m	MPC · JPL
434167	2002 TQ_{65}	—	October 5, 2002	Socorro	LINEAR	T_{j} (2.87)	4.3 km	MPC · JPL
434168	2002 TM_{80}	—	October 1, 2002	Anderson Mesa	LONEOS	·	1.1 km	MPC · JPL
434169	2002 TQ_{93}	—	October 3, 2002	Socorro	LINEAR	·	640 m	MPC · JPL
434170	2002 TN_{99}	—	October 4, 2002	Palomar	NEAT	·	2.3 km	MPC · JPL
434171	2002 TN_{128}	—	October 4, 2002	Palomar	NEAT	·	1.2 km	MPC · JPL
434172	2002 TR_{155}	—	October 5, 2002	Palomar	NEAT	·	1.1 km	MPC · JPL
434173	2002 TP_{170}	—	October 3, 2002	Palomar	NEAT	·	2.6 km	MPC · JPL
434174	2002 TQ_{339}	—	October 5, 2002	Apache Point	SDSS	·	1.9 km	MPC · JPL
434175	2002 TF_{363}	—	October 10, 2002	Apache Point	SDSS	V	520 m	MPC · JPL
434176	2002 UA	—	October 5, 2002	Socorro	LINEAR	·	1.8 km	MPC · JPL
434177	2002 UP_{21}	—	October 30, 2002	Palomar	NEAT	·	970 m	MPC · JPL
434178	2002 US_{27}	—	October 31, 2002	Palomar	NEAT	fast	750 m	MPC · JPL
434179	2002 UB_{74}	—	October 31, 2002	Palomar	NEAT	·	730 m	MPC · JPL
434180 Brosens	2002 UB_{77}	Brosens	October 31, 2002	Palomar	NEAT	·	800 m	MPC · JPL
434181	2002 VY_{104}	—	November 12, 2002	Socorro	LINEAR	H	650 m	MPC · JPL
434182	2002 WU_{26}	—	October 4, 2002	Campo Imperatore	CINEOS	3:2 · SHU	5.8 km	MPC · JPL
434183	2002 XL_{9}	—	November 28, 2002	Anderson Mesa	LONEOS	·	1.4 km	MPC · JPL
434184	2002 XX_{9}	—	December 2, 2002	Socorro	LINEAR	·	1.5 km	MPC · JPL
434185	2002 XE_{61}	—	December 10, 2002	Socorro	LINEAR	·	2.6 km	MPC · JPL
434186	2002 XH_{83}	—	December 13, 2002	Palomar	NEAT	·	2.8 km	MPC · JPL
434187	2003 AN_{2}	—	January 1, 2003	Socorro	LINEAR	·	780 m	MPC · JPL
434188	2003 AD_{23}	—	January 7, 2003	Socorro	LINEAR	APO · PHA	540 m	MPC · JPL
434189	2003 AT_{25}	—	January 4, 2003	Socorro	LINEAR	·	2.7 km	MPC · JPL
434190	2003 AN_{87}	—	January 1, 2003	Socorro	LINEAR	·	3.9 km	MPC · JPL
434191	2003 BT_{46}	—	January 8, 2003	Socorro	LINEAR	·	2.9 km	MPC · JPL
434192	2003 CQ_{1}	—	February 2, 2003	Palomar	NEAT	T_{j} (2.98)	4.9 km	MPC · JPL
434193	2003 DY_{8}	—	December 28, 2002	Kitt Peak	Spacewatch	·	3.1 km	MPC · JPL
434194	2003 FK_{127}	—	March 30, 2003	Kitt Peak	M. W. Buie	cubewano (cold)	127 km	MPC · JPL
434195	2003 GV_{24}	—	April 7, 2003	Kitt Peak	Spacewatch	·	850 m	MPC · JPL
434196	2003 HG_{2}	—	April 24, 2003	Desert Eagle	W. K. Y. Yeung	APO · PHA	170 m	MPC · JPL
434197	2003 HH_{49}	—	April 30, 2003	Kitt Peak	Spacewatch	·	1.1 km	MPC · JPL
434198	2003 NN_{5}	—	July 3, 2003	Kitt Peak	Spacewatch	·	930 m	MPC · JPL
434199	2003 OW	—	July 20, 2003	Palomar	NEAT	·	4.6 km	MPC · JPL
434200	2003 PR	—	August 1, 2003	Socorro	LINEAR	(5)	1.3 km	MPC · JPL

== 434201–434300 ==
back to top

Designation			Discovery			Properties		Ref
Permanent	Provisional	Named after	Date	Site	Discoverer(s)	Category	Diam.	Ref
434201	2003 QH_{10}	—	August 4, 2003	Socorro	LINEAR	·	1.4 km	MPC · JPL
434202	2003 QO_{56}	—	August 23, 2003	Socorro	LINEAR	(5)	1.0 km	MPC · JPL
434203	2003 QA_{59}	—	August 23, 2003	Socorro	LINEAR	·	1.6 km	MPC · JPL
434204	2003 QO_{99}	—	July 29, 2003	Socorro	LINEAR	·	2.1 km	MPC · JPL
434205	2003 QK_{104}	—	August 30, 2003	Reedy Creek	J. Broughton	·	1.6 km	MPC · JPL
434206	2003 QZ_{114}	—	August 23, 2003	Campo Imperatore	CINEOS	·	1.5 km	MPC · JPL
434207	2003 SP_{1}	—	September 16, 2003	Kitt Peak	Spacewatch	·	2.0 km	MPC · JPL
434208	2003 SW_{13}	—	September 16, 2003	Kitt Peak	Spacewatch	·	970 m	MPC · JPL
434209	2003 SH_{17}	—	September 2, 2003	Socorro	LINEAR	·	1.4 km	MPC · JPL
434210	2003 SD_{18}	—	September 16, 2003	Kitt Peak	Spacewatch	·	670 m	MPC · JPL
434211	2003 SN_{37}	—	September 4, 2003	Socorro	LINEAR	·	2.4 km	MPC · JPL
434212	2003 SK_{41}	—	September 17, 2003	Palomar	NEAT	·	780 m	MPC · JPL
434213	2003 SR_{50}	—	September 18, 2003	Palomar	NEAT	·	1.3 km	MPC · JPL
434214	2003 SQ_{55}	—	September 16, 2003	Anderson Mesa	LONEOS	EUN	1.5 km	MPC · JPL
434215	2003 SO_{56}	—	September 16, 2003	Socorro	LINEAR	·	1.7 km	MPC · JPL
434216	2003 SJ_{63}	—	September 17, 2003	Kitt Peak	Spacewatch	·	1.3 km	MPC · JPL
434217	2003 SV_{70}	—	September 18, 2003	Kitt Peak	Spacewatch	·	1.6 km	MPC · JPL
434218	2003 SA_{75}	—	September 18, 2003	Kitt Peak	Spacewatch	·	1.5 km	MPC · JPL
434219	2003 SG_{93}	—	September 18, 2003	Kitt Peak	Spacewatch	·	1.5 km	MPC · JPL
434220	2003 SP_{95}	—	September 19, 2003	Palomar	NEAT	·	2.2 km	MPC · JPL
434221	2003 SZ_{147}	—	September 16, 2003	Socorro	LINEAR	RAF	1.2 km	MPC · JPL
434222	2003 SB_{167}	—	September 22, 2003	Socorro	LINEAR	·	1.6 km	MPC · JPL
434223	2003 ST_{171}	—	September 18, 2003	Kitt Peak	Spacewatch	·	2.9 km	MPC · JPL
434224	2003 SA_{191}	—	September 4, 2003	Socorro	LINEAR	EUN	1.2 km	MPC · JPL
434225	2003 SQ_{201}	—	September 26, 2003	Desert Eagle	W. K. Y. Yeung	·	1.6 km	MPC · JPL
434226	2003 SB_{226}	—	September 26, 2003	Socorro	LINEAR	·	1.7 km	MPC · JPL
434227	2003 SM_{235}	—	September 28, 2003	Socorro	LINEAR	·	1.7 km	MPC · JPL
434228	2003 SO_{272}	—	September 27, 2003	Socorro	LINEAR	·	1.7 km	MPC · JPL
434229	2003 SG_{273}	—	September 27, 2003	Socorro	LINEAR	·	1.6 km	MPC · JPL
434230	2003 SD_{278}	—	September 30, 2003	Socorro	LINEAR	·	2.0 km	MPC · JPL
434231	2003 SR_{280}	—	September 18, 2003	Kitt Peak	Spacewatch	·	840 m	MPC · JPL
434232	2003 SO_{295}	—	September 29, 2003	Anderson Mesa	LONEOS	·	1.3 km	MPC · JPL
434233	2003 ST_{296}	—	September 29, 2003	Anderson Mesa	LONEOS	H	620 m	MPC · JPL
434234	2003 SA_{304}	—	September 17, 2003	Palomar	NEAT	·	660 m	MPC · JPL
434235	2003 SE_{317}	—	September 18, 2003	Kitt Peak	Spacewatch	·	630 m	MPC · JPL
434236	2003 SH_{330}	—	September 26, 2003	Apache Point	SDSS	·	1.5 km	MPC · JPL
434237	2003 SJ_{333}	—	September 21, 2003	Campo Imperatore	CINEOS	·	590 m	MPC · JPL
434238	2003 SK_{335}	—	September 26, 2003	Apache Point	SDSS	·	1.6 km	MPC · JPL
434239	2003 SW_{339}	—	September 26, 2003	Apache Point	SDSS	·	1.5 km	MPC · JPL
434240	2003 SZ_{394}	—	September 26, 2003	Apache Point	SDSS	·	2.1 km	MPC · JPL
434241	2003 UN_{6}	—	October 18, 2003	Palomar	NEAT	H	550 m	MPC · JPL
434242	2003 UA_{20}	—	October 22, 2003	Socorro	LINEAR	·	540 m	MPC · JPL
434243	2003 UH_{20}	—	October 22, 2003	Socorro	LINEAR	PHO	890 m	MPC · JPL
434244	2003 UK_{22}	—	September 20, 2003	Anderson Mesa	LONEOS	·	1.9 km	MPC · JPL
434245	2003 UB_{38}	—	October 17, 2003	Kitt Peak	Spacewatch	·	1.9 km	MPC · JPL
434246	2003 UK_{38}	—	October 17, 2003	Kitt Peak	Spacewatch	·	2.6 km	MPC · JPL
434247	2003 UR_{44}	—	October 18, 2003	Kitt Peak	Spacewatch	·	2.4 km	MPC · JPL
434248	2003 UP_{47}	—	October 24, 2003	Socorro	LINEAR	·	720 m	MPC · JPL
434249	2003 UT_{53}	—	September 30, 2003	Socorro	LINEAR	·	2.3 km	MPC · JPL
434250	2003 US_{56}	—	October 23, 2003	Anderson Mesa	LONEOS	EUN	1.5 km	MPC · JPL
434251	2003 UW_{69}	—	October 18, 2003	Kitt Peak	Spacewatch	·	610 m	MPC · JPL
434252	2003 UT_{73}	—	October 23, 2003	Anderson Mesa	LONEOS	H	570 m	MPC · JPL
434253	2003 UZ_{76}	—	October 17, 2003	Kitt Peak	Spacewatch	·	2.2 km	MPC · JPL
434254	2003 UJ_{143}	—	October 22, 2003	Socorro	LINEAR	·	2.5 km	MPC · JPL
434255	2003 UZ_{154}	—	October 5, 2003	Kitt Peak	Spacewatch	·	570 m	MPC · JPL
434256	2003 UH_{156}	—	September 16, 2003	Kitt Peak	Spacewatch	·	1.7 km	MPC · JPL
434257	2003 UC_{166}	—	October 21, 2003	Kitt Peak	Spacewatch	·	1.9 km	MPC · JPL
434258	2003 UV_{175}	—	September 22, 2003	Kitt Peak	Spacewatch	·	1.8 km	MPC · JPL
434259	2003 UX_{198}	—	September 22, 2003	Kitt Peak	Spacewatch	·	2.2 km	MPC · JPL
434260	2003 UZ_{201}	—	October 21, 2003	Socorro	LINEAR	·	2.3 km	MPC · JPL
434261	2003 UD_{212}	—	October 23, 2003	Kitt Peak	Spacewatch	·	1.8 km	MPC · JPL
434262	2003 UV_{230}	—	October 23, 2003	Kitt Peak	Spacewatch	·	630 m	MPC · JPL
434263	2003 UL_{250}	—	October 25, 2003	Socorro	LINEAR	·	2.3 km	MPC · JPL
434264	2003 UA_{301}	—	October 17, 2003	Anderson Mesa	LONEOS	·	2.5 km	MPC · JPL
434265	2003 UV_{350}	—	October 19, 2003	Apache Point	SDSS	·	1.8 km	MPC · JPL
434266	2003 UF_{400}	—	October 22, 2003	Kitt Peak	Spacewatch	GEF	1.2 km	MPC · JPL
434267	2003 WM_{5}	—	November 18, 2003	Palomar	NEAT	·	2.4 km	MPC · JPL
434268	2003 WZ_{13}	—	October 19, 2003	Kitt Peak	Spacewatch	·	2.0 km	MPC · JPL
434269	2003 WU_{23}	—	November 18, 2003	Kitt Peak	Spacewatch	·	2.8 km	MPC · JPL
434270	2003 WQ_{24}	—	November 20, 2003	Socorro	LINEAR	H	640 m	MPC · JPL
434271	2003 WT_{26}	—	November 19, 2003	Anderson Mesa	LONEOS	·	710 m	MPC · JPL
434272	2003 WA_{33}	—	November 18, 2003	Palomar	NEAT	·	1.8 km	MPC · JPL
434273	2003 WR_{46}	—	October 24, 2003	Kitt Peak	Spacewatch	·	680 m	MPC · JPL
434274	2003 WY_{78}	—	November 20, 2003	Socorro	LINEAR	·	1.4 km	MPC · JPL
434275	2003 WR_{80}	—	November 20, 2003	Catalina	CSS	H	540 m	MPC · JPL
434276	2003 WA_{92}	—	November 18, 2003	Kitt Peak	Spacewatch	·	760 m	MPC · JPL
434277	2003 WK_{115}	—	November 20, 2003	Socorro	LINEAR	·	2.7 km	MPC · JPL
434278	2003 WN_{144}	—	November 16, 2003	Catalina	CSS	·	630 m	MPC · JPL
434279	2003 XO_{15}	—	December 1, 2003	Socorro	LINEAR	fast	2.7 km	MPC · JPL
434280	2003 XB_{32}	—	December 1, 2003	Kitt Peak	Spacewatch	·	1.6 km	MPC · JPL
434281	2003 XE_{35}	—	December 3, 2003	Socorro	LINEAR	·	2.6 km	MPC · JPL
434282	2003 YJ_{8}	—	October 20, 2003	Socorro	LINEAR	·	1.2 km	MPC · JPL
434283	2003 YD_{35}	—	December 18, 2003	Palomar	NEAT	H	710 m	MPC · JPL
434284	2003 YB_{49}	—	December 4, 2003	Socorro	LINEAR	·	2.6 km	MPC · JPL
434285	2003 YV_{126}	—	December 27, 2003	Socorro	LINEAR	·	1.5 km	MPC · JPL
434286	2003 YR_{159}	—	November 19, 2003	Socorro	LINEAR	·	2.3 km	MPC · JPL
434287	2003 YX_{171}	—	December 18, 2003	Kitt Peak	Spacewatch	·	2.1 km	MPC · JPL
434288	2004 BP_{6}	—	January 17, 2004	Palomar	NEAT	·	2.5 km	MPC · JPL
434289	2004 BQ_{12}	—	January 17, 2004	Palomar	NEAT	·	650 m	MPC · JPL
434290	2004 BO_{68}	—	January 23, 2004	Socorro	LINEAR	H	680 m	MPC · JPL
434291	2004 BN_{78}	—	January 22, 2004	Socorro	LINEAR	·	920 m	MPC · JPL
434292	2004 BK_{85}	—	January 22, 2004	Socorro	LINEAR	H	640 m	MPC · JPL
434293	2004 BM_{154}	—	January 28, 2004	Kitt Peak	Spacewatch	·	1.4 km	MPC · JPL
434294	2004 CT_{21}	—	January 30, 2004	Kitt Peak	Spacewatch	·	760 m	MPC · JPL
434295	2004 CK_{83}	—	February 12, 2004	Kitt Peak	Spacewatch	·	690 m	MPC · JPL
434296	2004 DD_{30}	—	February 17, 2004	Socorro	LINEAR	·	1.0 km	MPC · JPL
434297	2004 DK_{46}	—	February 19, 2004	Socorro	LINEAR	·	2.3 km	MPC · JPL
434298	2004 EW_{17}	—	March 12, 2004	Palomar	NEAT	·	1.4 km	MPC · JPL
434299	2004 EP_{29}	—	March 15, 2004	Kitt Peak	Spacewatch	·	1.8 km	MPC · JPL
434300	2004 EV_{43}	—	March 11, 2004	Palomar	NEAT	·	1.0 km	MPC · JPL

== 434301–434400 ==
back to top

Designation			Discovery			Properties		Ref
Permanent	Provisional	Named after	Date	Site	Discoverer(s)	Category	Diam.	Ref
434301	2004 EP_{53}	—	March 15, 2004	Socorro	LINEAR	·	2.0 km	MPC · JPL
434302	2004 EQ_{93}	—	March 15, 2004	Kitt Peak	Spacewatch	·	1.0 km	MPC · JPL
434303	2004 EU_{100}	—	March 15, 2004	Kitt Peak	Spacewatch	EOS	1.6 km	MPC · JPL
434304	2004 FC_{21}	—	February 23, 2004	Socorro	LINEAR	·	3.4 km	MPC · JPL
434305	2004 FM_{25}	—	March 17, 2004	Socorro	LINEAR	·	2.4 km	MPC · JPL
434306	2004 FO_{29}	—	March 19, 2004	Socorro	LINEAR	·	1.2 km	MPC · JPL
434307	2004 FT_{41}	—	March 30, 2004	Catalina	CSS	·	1.5 km	MPC · JPL
434308	2004 FW_{80}	—	March 16, 2004	Socorro	LINEAR	·	1.2 km	MPC · JPL
434309	2004 FO_{111}	—	March 26, 2004	Socorro	LINEAR	·	1.2 km	MPC · JPL
434310	2004 FP_{127}	—	March 18, 2004	Socorro	LINEAR	·	920 m	MPC · JPL
434311	2004 FV_{141}	—	March 27, 2004	Catalina	CSS	·	3.0 km	MPC · JPL
434312	2004 FR_{159}	—	March 18, 2004	Kitt Peak	Spacewatch	·	850 m	MPC · JPL
434313	2004 GP	—	April 9, 2004	Socorro	LINEAR	ATE	470 m	MPC · JPL
434314	2004 GU_{22}	—	April 12, 2004	Anderson Mesa	LONEOS	·	1.0 km	MPC · JPL
434315	2004 GN_{28}	—	April 14, 2004	Socorro	LINEAR	H	620 m	MPC · JPL
434316	2004 GY_{44}	—	March 31, 2004	Kitt Peak	Spacewatch	MAS	610 m	MPC · JPL
434317	2004 GP_{49}	—	April 12, 2004	Kitt Peak	Spacewatch	V	590 m	MPC · JPL
434318	2004 GT_{63}	—	March 16, 2004	Kitt Peak	Spacewatch	NYS	890 m	MPC · JPL
434319	2004 GZ_{69}	—	April 13, 2004	Kitt Peak	Spacewatch	EOS	1.8 km	MPC · JPL
434320	2004 GT_{73}	—	April 15, 2004	Bergisch Gladbach	W. Bickel	·	2.0 km	MPC · JPL
434321	2004 GO_{77}	—	April 14, 2004	Catalina	CSS	·	3.8 km	MPC · JPL
434322	2004 GT_{80}	—	March 15, 2004	Kitt Peak	Spacewatch	·	890 m	MPC · JPL
434323	2004 HD_{10}	—	April 17, 2004	Socorro	LINEAR	·	5.0 km	MPC · JPL
434324	2004 HN_{59}	—	April 25, 2004	Kitt Peak	Spacewatch	MAS	580 m	MPC · JPL
434325 Lautréamont	2004 JD_{2}	Lautréamont	May 11, 2004	Catalina	CSS	T_{j} (2.86)	3.1 km	MPC · JPL
434326	2004 JG_{6}	—	May 11, 2004	Anderson Mesa	LONEOS	IEO · PHA	720 m	MPC · JPL
434327	2004 JA_{10}	—	May 9, 2004	Kitt Peak	Spacewatch	·	4.0 km	MPC · JPL
434328	2004 JD_{11}	—	May 12, 2004	Catalina	CSS	·	4.4 km	MPC · JPL
434329	2004 JM_{13}	—	May 14, 2004	Palomar	NEAT	·	3.3 km	MPC · JPL
434330	2004 JM_{23}	—	May 13, 2004	Palomar	NEAT	·	4.4 km	MPC · JPL
434331	2004 JY_{39}	—	May 14, 2004	Kitt Peak	Spacewatch	·	3.9 km	MPC · JPL
434332	2004 JJ_{56}	—	May 12, 2004	Apache Point	SDSS	·	2.8 km	MPC · JPL
434333	2004 KS_{5}	—	May 17, 2004	Socorro	LINEAR	T_{j} (2.97)	3.5 km	MPC · JPL
434334	2004 KU_{18}	—	May 19, 2004	Kitt Peak	Spacewatch	·	4.8 km	MPC · JPL
434335	2004 LF_{9}	—	June 13, 2004	Kitt Peak	Spacewatch	THB	3.2 km	MPC · JPL
434336	2004 LU_{21}	—	April 25, 2003	Kitt Peak	Spacewatch	EUN	2.1 km	MPC · JPL
434337	2004 LN_{26}	—	June 12, 2004	Kitt Peak	Spacewatch	·	3.2 km	MPC · JPL
434338	2004 LJ_{30}	—	June 13, 2004	Socorro	LINEAR	·	5.8 km	MPC · JPL
434339	2004 MQ_{8}	—	June 27, 2004	Siding Spring	SSS	·	1.3 km	MPC · JPL
434340	2004 PE_{23}	—	August 8, 2004	Socorro	LINEAR	NYS	1.3 km	MPC · JPL
434341	2004 PU_{80}	—	August 10, 2004	Socorro	LINEAR	·	1.4 km	MPC · JPL
434342	2004 QH_{17}	—	August 25, 2004	Socorro	LINEAR	·	4.6 km	MPC · JPL
434343	2004 RG	—	September 2, 2004	Kleť	Kleť	EUN	1.1 km	MPC · JPL
434344	2004 RV_{10}	—	September 8, 2004	Socorro	LINEAR	APO	380 m	MPC · JPL
434345	2004 RD_{17}	—	September 7, 2004	Kitt Peak	Spacewatch	NYS	980 m	MPC · JPL
434346	2004 RU_{70}	—	September 8, 2004	Socorro	LINEAR	·	1.1 km	MPC · JPL
434347	2004 RV_{86}	—	September 7, 2004	Kitt Peak	Spacewatch	·	960 m	MPC · JPL
434348	2004 RE_{102}	—	September 8, 2004	Socorro	LINEAR	·	1.0 km	MPC · JPL
434349	2004 RG_{138}	—	September 8, 2004	Palomar	NEAT	·	1.5 km	MPC · JPL
434350	2004 RD_{144}	—	September 8, 2004	Socorro	LINEAR	·	1.9 km	MPC · JPL
434351	2004 RC_{147}	—	September 9, 2004	Socorro	LINEAR	·	970 m	MPC · JPL
434352	2004 RD_{193}	—	September 10, 2004	Socorro	LINEAR	·	1.6 km	MPC · JPL
434353	2004 RY_{204}	—	September 7, 2004	Palomar	NEAT	PHO	1.2 km	MPC · JPL
434354	2004 RR_{214}	—	September 11, 2004	Socorro	LINEAR	·	1.6 km	MPC · JPL
434355	2004 RN_{216}	—	September 11, 2004	Socorro	LINEAR	·	1.4 km	MPC · JPL
434356	2004 RK_{245}	—	September 10, 2004	Kitt Peak	Spacewatch	·	1.1 km	MPC · JPL
434357	2004 RC_{350}	—	September 12, 2004	Mauna Kea	P. A. Wiegert	·	1.0 km	MPC · JPL
434358	2004 RS_{356}	—	September 7, 2004	Kitt Peak	Spacewatch	·	1.4 km	MPC · JPL
434359	2004 SU_{42}	—	September 18, 2004	Socorro	LINEAR	·	1.0 km	MPC · JPL
434360	2004 SK_{59}	—	September 22, 2004	Socorro	LINEAR	·	2.5 km	MPC · JPL
434361	2004 TL_{3}	—	October 4, 2004	Kitt Peak	Spacewatch	·	1.1 km	MPC · JPL
434362	2004 TG_{25}	—	October 4, 2004	Kitt Peak	Spacewatch	·	1.4 km	MPC · JPL
434363	2004 TL_{39}	—	October 4, 2004	Kitt Peak	Spacewatch	·	2.0 km	MPC · JPL
434364	2004 TD_{57}	—	October 5, 2004	Kitt Peak	Spacewatch	·	1.1 km	MPC · JPL
434365	2004 TG_{77}	—	October 7, 2004	Kitt Peak	Spacewatch	·	1.0 km	MPC · JPL
434366	2004 TJ_{92}	—	October 5, 2004	Kitt Peak	Spacewatch	·	1.4 km	MPC · JPL
434367	2004 TT_{93}	—	September 7, 2004	Kitt Peak	Spacewatch	·	1.9 km	MPC · JPL
434368	2004 TK_{111}	—	October 7, 2004	Kitt Peak	Spacewatch	·	1.7 km	MPC · JPL
434369	2004 TE_{141}	—	October 4, 2004	Kitt Peak	Spacewatch	·	1.3 km	MPC · JPL
434370	2004 TA_{214}	—	October 9, 2004	Kitt Peak	Spacewatch	·	1.8 km	MPC · JPL
434371	2004 TY_{237}	—	October 9, 2004	Kitt Peak	Spacewatch	·	1.5 km	MPC · JPL
434372	2004 TO_{259}	—	October 9, 2004	Kitt Peak	Spacewatch	MAR	1.1 km	MPC · JPL
434373	2004 TU_{315}	—	October 11, 2004	Kitt Peak	Spacewatch	·	1.2 km	MPC · JPL
434374	2004 TW_{321}	—	October 11, 2004	Kitt Peak	Spacewatch	EUN	1.0 km	MPC · JPL
434375	2004 TM_{324}	—	October 12, 2004	Socorro	LINEAR	MAR	1.2 km	MPC · JPL
434376	2004 TN_{326}	—	September 14, 2004	Socorro	LINEAR	·	1.5 km	MPC · JPL
434377	2004 TD_{342}	—	October 13, 2004	Kitt Peak	Spacewatch	·	2.3 km	MPC · JPL
434378	2004 TE_{351}	—	October 10, 2004	Kitt Peak	Spacewatch	·	1.8 km	MPC · JPL
434379	2004 TP_{369}	—	October 10, 2004	Kitt Peak	Spacewatch	·	2.4 km	MPC · JPL
434380	2004 UX_{5}	—	October 20, 2004	Socorro	LINEAR	·	1.3 km	MPC · JPL
434381	2004 VN_{19}	—	October 15, 2004	Mount Lemmon	Mount Lemmon Survey	·	2.4 km	MPC · JPL
434382	2004 VJ_{37}	—	November 4, 2004	Kitt Peak	Spacewatch	·	1.6 km	MPC · JPL
434383	2004 VF_{77}	—	November 12, 2004	Catalina	CSS	·	2.1 km	MPC · JPL
434384	2004 VE_{82}	—	November 10, 2004	Kitt Peak	Spacewatch	JUN	1.3 km	MPC · JPL
434385	2004 XK_{83}	—	November 20, 2004	Kitt Peak	Spacewatch	·	1.8 km	MPC · JPL
434386	2004 XX_{156}	—	December 2, 2004	Kitt Peak	Spacewatch	AEO	1.0 km	MPC · JPL
434387	2005 AY_{75}	—	February 20, 2002	Kitt Peak	Spacewatch	·	790 m	MPC · JPL
434388	2005 BH_{49}	—	January 17, 2005	Kitt Peak	Spacewatch	·	1.9 km	MPC · JPL
434389	2005 CN_{43}	—	February 2, 2005	Catalina	CSS	·	2.0 km	MPC · JPL
434390	2005 CH_{81}	—	February 10, 2005	Mauna Kea	Canada-France Ecliptic Plane Survey	SDO	90 km	MPC · JPL
434391	2005 EY_{91}	—	March 8, 2005	Anderson Mesa	LONEOS	·	3.2 km	MPC · JPL
434392	2005 EM_{185}	—	March 10, 2005	Mount Lemmon	Mount Lemmon Survey	·	2.8 km	MPC · JPL
434393	2005 EB_{200}	—	March 12, 2005	Mount Lemmon	Mount Lemmon Survey	·	1.7 km	MPC · JPL
434394	2005 EL_{245}	—	March 12, 2005	Kitt Peak	Spacewatch	·	600 m	MPC · JPL
434395	2005 ED_{264}	—	March 13, 2005	Kitt Peak	Spacewatch	AGN	1.1 km	MPC · JPL
434396	2005 EO_{278}	—	March 9, 2005	Mount Lemmon	Mount Lemmon Survey	·	2.0 km	MPC · JPL
434397	2005 EK_{312}	—	March 10, 2005	Kitt Peak	M. W. Buie	·	1.7 km	MPC · JPL
434398	2005 EH_{325}	—	March 8, 2005	Mount Lemmon	Mount Lemmon Survey	·	670 m	MPC · JPL
434399	2005 GC_{15}	—	April 2, 2005	Mount Lemmon	Mount Lemmon Survey	·	1.5 km	MPC · JPL
434400	2005 GF_{18}	—	March 16, 2005	Kitt Peak	Spacewatch	·	1.3 km	MPC · JPL

== 434401–434500 ==
back to top

Designation			Discovery			Properties		Ref
Permanent	Provisional	Named after	Date	Site	Discoverer(s)	Category	Diam.	Ref
434401	2005 GM_{93}	—	April 6, 2005	Kitt Peak	Spacewatch	·	690 m	MPC · JPL
434402	2005 GH_{129}	—	April 7, 2005	Kitt Peak	Spacewatch	·	1.6 km	MPC · JPL
434403	2005 GG_{131}	—	April 10, 2005	Kitt Peak	Spacewatch	·	650 m	MPC · JPL
434404	2005 GX_{179}	—	April 6, 2005	Catalina	CSS	H	570 m	MPC · JPL
434405	2005 JT_{27}	—	May 3, 2005	Catalina	CSS	·	2.2 km	MPC · JPL
434406	2005 JM_{34}	—	May 4, 2005	Kitt Peak	Spacewatch	·	580 m	MPC · JPL
434407	2005 JF_{39}	—	May 7, 2005	Kitt Peak	Spacewatch	·	640 m	MPC · JPL
434408	2005 JH_{54}	—	May 4, 2005	Kitt Peak	Spacewatch	·	610 m	MPC · JPL
434409	2005 JS_{69}	—	May 7, 2005	Kitt Peak	Spacewatch	·	530 m	MPC · JPL
434410	2005 JJ_{80}	—	May 10, 2005	Catalina	CSS	·	1.4 km	MPC · JPL
434411	2005 JK_{103}	—	May 9, 2005	Kitt Peak	Spacewatch	·	1.7 km	MPC · JPL
434412	2005 JT_{132}	—	May 14, 2005	Kitt Peak	Spacewatch	·	530 m	MPC · JPL
434413	2005 JB_{148}	—	May 15, 2005	Palomar	NEAT	·	4.2 km	MPC · JPL
434414	2005 JT_{161}	—	April 11, 2005	Mount Lemmon	Mount Lemmon Survey	·	2.9 km	MPC · JPL
434415	2005 JM_{170}	—	May 10, 2005	Cerro Tololo	M. W. Buie	·	1.9 km	MPC · JPL
434416	2005 LS_{6}	—	June 1, 2005	Kitt Peak	Spacewatch	·	590 m	MPC · JPL
434417	2005 LJ_{14}	—	May 15, 2005	Mount Lemmon	Mount Lemmon Survey	EOS	2.3 km	MPC · JPL
434418	2005 LE_{52}	—	June 15, 2005	Mount Lemmon	Mount Lemmon Survey	·	720 m	MPC · JPL
434419	2005 MH_{4}	—	June 16, 2005	Mount Lemmon	Mount Lemmon Survey	·	610 m	MPC · JPL
434420	2005 MC_{13}	—	June 29, 2005	Palomar	NEAT	·	670 m	MPC · JPL
434421	2005 MO_{18}	—	June 28, 2005	Palomar	NEAT	·	840 m	MPC · JPL
434422	2005 MG_{25}	—	June 27, 2005	Kitt Peak	Spacewatch	·	2.0 km	MPC · JPL
434423	2005 MM_{25}	—	June 27, 2005	Kitt Peak	Spacewatch	·	880 m	MPC · JPL
434424	2005 MZ_{26}	—	June 29, 2005	Kitt Peak	Spacewatch	·	690 m	MPC · JPL
434425	2005 ML_{29}	—	June 29, 2005	Kitt Peak	Spacewatch	·	2.6 km	MPC · JPL
434426	2005 MA_{39}	—	June 30, 2005	Kitt Peak	Spacewatch	·	770 m	MPC · JPL
434427	2005 MC_{45}	—	June 15, 2005	Kitt Peak	Spacewatch	·	860 m	MPC · JPL
434428	2005 NQ_{3}	—	July 1, 2005	Kitt Peak	Spacewatch	·	3.0 km	MPC · JPL
434429	2005 NF_{4}	—	July 2, 2005	Kitt Peak	Spacewatch	·	780 m	MPC · JPL
434430	2005 NQ_{6}	—	July 4, 2005	Mount Lemmon	Mount Lemmon Survey	·	3.6 km	MPC · JPL
434431	2005 NC_{7}	—	July 5, 2005	Kitt Peak	Spacewatch	·	2.2 km	MPC · JPL
434432	2005 NG_{7}	—	July 4, 2005	Kitt Peak	Spacewatch	·	500 m	MPC · JPL
434433	2005 NO_{8}	—	July 1, 2005	Kitt Peak	Spacewatch	T_{j} (2.95)	3.3 km	MPC · JPL
434434	2005 NK_{15}	—	July 2, 2005	Kitt Peak	Spacewatch	·	540 m	MPC · JPL
434435	2005 NF_{17}	—	July 3, 2005	Mount Lemmon	Mount Lemmon Survey	·	890 m	MPC · JPL
434436	2005 NX_{23}	—	July 4, 2005	Kitt Peak	Spacewatch	·	2.5 km	MPC · JPL
434437	2005 NV_{33}	—	July 5, 2005	Kitt Peak	Spacewatch	·	4.2 km	MPC · JPL
434438	2005 NJ_{35}	—	July 5, 2005	Kitt Peak	Spacewatch	·	2.6 km	MPC · JPL
434439	2005 NX_{37}	—	July 6, 2005	Kitt Peak	Spacewatch	·	2.6 km	MPC · JPL
434440	2005 NB_{39}	—	June 18, 2005	Mount Lemmon	Mount Lemmon Survey	·	750 m	MPC · JPL
434441	2005 NS_{47}	—	July 7, 2005	Kitt Peak	Spacewatch	·	3.1 km	MPC · JPL
434442	2005 NE_{49}	—	July 10, 2005	Siding Spring	SSS	·	880 m	MPC · JPL
434443	2005 NQ_{69}	—	June 13, 2005	Mount Lemmon	Mount Lemmon Survey	·	3.3 km	MPC · JPL
434444	2005 NM_{71}	—	July 5, 2005	Mount Lemmon	Mount Lemmon Survey	·	2.8 km	MPC · JPL
434445	2005 NN_{77}	—	July 11, 2005	Kitt Peak	Spacewatch	·	610 m	MPC · JPL
434446	2005 NC_{84}	—	July 1, 2005	Kitt Peak	Spacewatch	·	3.0 km	MPC · JPL
434447	2005 NA_{123}	—	July 5, 2005	Kitt Peak	Spacewatch	·	3.0 km	MPC · JPL
434448	2005 ON_{24}	—	July 30, 2005	Campo Imperatore	CINEOS	·	790 m	MPC · JPL
434449	2005 OD_{29}	—	July 30, 2005	Palomar	NEAT	·	2.4 km	MPC · JPL
434450	2005 OM_{31}	—	July 27, 2005	Palomar	NEAT	·	3.4 km	MPC · JPL
434451	2005 PV_{6}	—	August 4, 2005	Palomar	NEAT	·	670 m	MPC · JPL
434452	2005 PQ_{8}	—	August 4, 2005	Palomar	NEAT	·	770 m	MPC · JPL
434453 Ayerdhal	2005 PE_{17}	Ayerdhal	August 9, 2005	Saint-Sulpice	B. Christophe	EOS	2.3 km	MPC · JPL
434454	2005 QU	—	August 22, 2005	Palomar	NEAT	·	820 m	MPC · JPL
434455	2005 QY_{4}	—	August 22, 2005	Palomar	NEAT	H	530 m	MPC · JPL
434456	2005 QW_{13}	—	August 24, 2005	Palomar	NEAT	·	2.2 km	MPC · JPL
434457	2005 QQ_{17}	—	August 25, 2005	Palomar	NEAT	·	950 m	MPC · JPL
434458	2005 QP_{25}	—	August 27, 2005	Kitt Peak	Spacewatch	·	4.2 km	MPC · JPL
434459	2005 QC_{26}	—	August 27, 2005	Kitt Peak	Spacewatch	·	2.1 km	MPC · JPL
434460	2005 QT_{33}	—	August 25, 2005	Palomar	NEAT	·	1.3 km	MPC · JPL
434461	2005 QF_{34}	—	August 25, 2005	Palomar	NEAT	·	910 m	MPC · JPL
434462	2005 QN_{40}	—	August 26, 2005	Palomar	NEAT	·	2.7 km	MPC · JPL
434463	2005 QO_{40}	—	August 26, 2005	Palomar	NEAT	fast	2.2 km	MPC · JPL
434464	2005 QR_{45}	—	August 26, 2005	Palomar	NEAT	·	690 m	MPC · JPL
434465	2005 QW_{55}	—	August 28, 2005	Kitt Peak	Spacewatch	·	2.7 km	MPC · JPL
434466	2005 QO_{57}	—	August 24, 2005	Palomar	NEAT	·	2.3 km	MPC · JPL
434467	2005 QO_{67}	—	August 28, 2005	Kitt Peak	Spacewatch	·	590 m	MPC · JPL
434468	2005 QV_{77}	—	August 25, 2005	Palomar	NEAT	·	920 m	MPC · JPL
434469	2005 QY_{77}	—	August 25, 2005	Palomar	NEAT	THB	3.0 km	MPC · JPL
434470	2005 QF_{92}	—	August 26, 2005	Anderson Mesa	LONEOS	·	3.2 km	MPC · JPL
434471	2005 QW_{92}	—	July 9, 2005	Catalina	CSS	·	2.7 km	MPC · JPL
434472	2005 QA_{100}	—	August 27, 2005	Palomar	NEAT	·	800 m	MPC · JPL
434473	2005 QQ_{104}	—	August 27, 2005	Palomar	NEAT	·	2.9 km	MPC · JPL
434474	2005 QD_{117}	—	August 28, 2005	Kitt Peak	Spacewatch	THM	2.2 km	MPC · JPL
434475	2005 QP_{117}	—	August 28, 2005	Kitt Peak	Spacewatch	THM	2.3 km	MPC · JPL
434476	2005 QP_{136}	—	August 28, 2005	Kitt Peak	Spacewatch	·	2.9 km	MPC · JPL
434477	2005 QX_{145}	—	August 27, 2005	Palomar	NEAT	·	1.4 km	MPC · JPL
434478	2005 QF_{159}	—	August 27, 2005	Palomar	NEAT	·	1.2 km	MPC · JPL
434479	2005 QG_{166}	—	August 27, 2005	Palomar	NEAT	H	440 m	MPC · JPL
434480	2005 QO_{175}	—	August 31, 2005	Kitt Peak	Spacewatch	MAS	710 m	MPC · JPL
434481	2005 QL_{181}	—	August 30, 2005	Kitt Peak	Spacewatch	·	940 m	MPC · JPL
434482	2005 RT_{1}	—	September 1, 2005	Palomar	NEAT	·	5.8 km	MPC · JPL
434483	2005 RS_{6}	—	September 3, 2005	Palomar	NEAT	·	3.4 km	MPC · JPL
434484	2005 RA_{11}	—	September 10, 2005	Anderson Mesa	LONEOS	·	1.5 km	MPC · JPL
434485	2005 RK_{19}	—	September 1, 2005	Kitt Peak	Spacewatch	·	830 m	MPC · JPL
434486	2005 RA_{32}	—	August 5, 2005	Siding Spring	SSS	·	2.9 km	MPC · JPL
434487	2005 RK_{38}	—	September 3, 2005	Mauna Kea	Veillet, C.	·	2.8 km	MPC · JPL
434488	2005 SX_{14}	—	September 26, 2005	Kitt Peak	Spacewatch	·	800 m	MPC · JPL
434489	2005 SW_{16}	—	September 26, 2005	Kitt Peak	Spacewatch	·	830 m	MPC · JPL
434490	2005 SP_{23}	—	September 14, 2005	Kitt Peak	Spacewatch	·	3.1 km	MPC · JPL
434491	2005 SZ_{25}	—	September 29, 2005	Wrightwood	J. W. Young	·	3.6 km	MPC · JPL
434492	2005 SD_{29}	—	September 23, 2005	Kitt Peak	Spacewatch	·	990 m	MPC · JPL
434493	2005 SO_{34}	—	September 23, 2005	Kitt Peak	Spacewatch	·	1.4 km	MPC · JPL
434494	2005 ST_{35}	—	September 23, 2005	Kitt Peak	Spacewatch	NYS	860 m	MPC · JPL
434495	2005 SV_{35}	—	September 23, 2005	Kitt Peak	Spacewatch	·	1.3 km	MPC · JPL
434496	2005 SU_{40}	—	September 13, 2005	Socorro	LINEAR	NYS	990 m	MPC · JPL
434497	2005 ST_{45}	—	September 24, 2005	Kitt Peak	Spacewatch	V	720 m	MPC · JPL
434498	2005 SE_{56}	—	September 25, 2005	Kitt Peak	Spacewatch	MAS	830 m	MPC · JPL
434499	2005 SZ_{68}	—	September 27, 2005	Kitt Peak	Spacewatch	V	590 m	MPC · JPL
434500	2005 SB_{71}	—	September 30, 2005	Catalina	CSS	APO	200 m	MPC · JPL

== 434501–434600 ==
back to top

Designation			Discovery			Properties		Ref
Permanent	Provisional	Named after	Date	Site	Discoverer(s)	Category	Diam.	Ref
434501	2005 SG_{75}	—	September 24, 2005	Kitt Peak	Spacewatch	V	620 m	MPC · JPL
434502	2005 SR_{77}	—	September 24, 2005	Kitt Peak	Spacewatch	·	3.1 km	MPC · JPL
434503	2005 SF_{78}	—	September 24, 2005	Kitt Peak	Spacewatch	·	770 m	MPC · JPL
434504	2005 SX_{82}	—	September 24, 2005	Kitt Peak	Spacewatch	·	880 m	MPC · JPL
434505	2005 SM_{84}	—	September 24, 2005	Kitt Peak	Spacewatch	·	1.0 km	MPC · JPL
434506	2005 SL_{87}	—	September 24, 2005	Kitt Peak	Spacewatch	·	1.0 km	MPC · JPL
434507	2005 SF_{93}	—	September 24, 2005	Kitt Peak	Spacewatch	NYS	1.0 km	MPC · JPL
434508	2005 SS_{102}	—	September 25, 2005	Kitt Peak	Spacewatch	·	970 m	MPC · JPL
434509	2005 SK_{116}	—	September 27, 2005	Kitt Peak	Spacewatch	·	710 m	MPC · JPL
434510	2005 SQ_{120}	—	September 29, 2005	Kitt Peak	Spacewatch	·	2.6 km	MPC · JPL
434511	2005 SW_{126}	—	September 29, 2005	Mount Lemmon	Mount Lemmon Survey	THM	3.5 km	MPC · JPL
434512	2005 SM_{132}	—	September 29, 2005	Kitt Peak	Spacewatch	·	890 m	MPC · JPL
434513	2005 SX_{134}	—	August 30, 2005	Kitt Peak	Spacewatch	·	1.7 km	MPC · JPL
434514	2005 SM_{151}	—	September 25, 2005	Kitt Peak	Spacewatch	·	1.1 km	MPC · JPL
434515	2005 SY_{152}	—	September 25, 2005	Kitt Peak	Spacewatch	PHO	920 m	MPC · JPL
434516	2005 SA_{154}	—	September 26, 2005	Kitt Peak	Spacewatch	·	4.3 km	MPC · JPL
434517	2005 SM_{163}	—	September 23, 2005	Kitt Peak	Spacewatch	·	750 m	MPC · JPL
434518	2005 SD_{164}	—	August 31, 2005	Anderson Mesa	LONEOS	·	1.1 km	MPC · JPL
434519	2005 SF_{167}	—	September 13, 2005	Catalina	CSS	·	1.5 km	MPC · JPL
434520	2005 SJ_{174}	—	September 29, 2005	Kitt Peak	Spacewatch	·	3.5 km	MPC · JPL
434521	2005 SY_{199}	—	September 1, 2005	Anderson Mesa	LONEOS	TIR	3.3 km	MPC · JPL
434522	2005 SM_{200}	—	September 30, 2005	Kitt Peak	Spacewatch	·	1.0 km	MPC · JPL
434523	2005 SU_{212}	—	September 30, 2005	Mount Lemmon	Mount Lemmon Survey	·	2.4 km	MPC · JPL
434524	2005 SZ_{215}	—	September 30, 2005	Anderson Mesa	LONEOS	V	690 m	MPC · JPL
434525	2005 SJ_{219}	—	September 30, 2005	Palomar	NEAT	T_{j} (2.98)	6.0 km	MPC · JPL
434526	2005 SZ_{219}	—	September 29, 2005	Catalina	CSS	·	3.4 km	MPC · JPL
434527	2005 SB_{235}	—	September 23, 2005	Kitt Peak	Spacewatch	·	3.4 km	MPC · JPL
434528	2005 SK_{246}	—	September 30, 2005	Kitt Peak	Spacewatch	·	1.1 km	MPC · JPL
434529	2005 SA_{250}	—	September 23, 2005	Catalina	CSS	MAS	690 m	MPC · JPL
434530	2005 SM_{250}	—	August 29, 2005	Kitt Peak	Spacewatch	·	3.0 km	MPC · JPL
434531	2005 SA_{252}	—	August 27, 2005	Anderson Mesa	LONEOS	·	960 m	MPC · JPL
434532	2005 SB_{255}	—	August 26, 2005	Anderson Mesa	LONEOS	·	950 m	MPC · JPL
434533	2005 SH_{264}	—	September 24, 2005	Palomar	NEAT	·	710 m	MPC · JPL
434534	2005 SS_{268}	—	September 24, 2005	Palomar	NEAT	NYS	1.0 km	MPC · JPL
434535	2005 SV_{268}	—	September 25, 2005	Catalina	CSS	·	1.1 km	MPC · JPL
434536	2005 SJ_{270}	—	September 29, 2005	Kitt Peak	Spacewatch	·	1.2 km	MPC · JPL
434537	2005 ST_{280}	—	September 29, 2005	Catalina	CSS	H	540 m	MPC · JPL
434538	2005 SG_{291}	—	September 26, 2005	Catalina	CSS	H	560 m	MPC · JPL
434539	2005 TM_{2}	—	October 1, 2005	Catalina	CSS	H	500 m	MPC · JPL
434540	2005 TB_{7}	—	October 1, 2005	Catalina	CSS	·	4.6 km	MPC · JPL
434541	2005 TA_{9}	—	October 1, 2005	Kitt Peak	Spacewatch	·	3.0 km	MPC · JPL
434542	2005 TG_{18}	—	October 1, 2005	Socorro	LINEAR	·	830 m	MPC · JPL
434543	2005 TM_{19}	—	October 1, 2005	Mount Lemmon	Mount Lemmon Survey	·	1.1 km	MPC · JPL
434544	2005 TF_{22}	—	October 1, 2005	Mount Lemmon	Mount Lemmon Survey	V	610 m	MPC · JPL
434545	2005 TH_{59}	—	October 1, 2005	Mount Lemmon	Mount Lemmon Survey	·	770 m	MPC · JPL
434546	2005 TF_{63}	—	October 4, 2005	Mount Lemmon	Mount Lemmon Survey	·	850 m	MPC · JPL
434547	2005 TL_{65}	—	October 1, 2005	Kitt Peak	Spacewatch	·	710 m	MPC · JPL
434548	2005 TA_{85}	—	September 24, 2005	Kitt Peak	Spacewatch	·	810 m	MPC · JPL
434549	2005 TS_{89}	—	October 5, 2005	Mount Lemmon	Mount Lemmon Survey	·	700 m	MPC · JPL
434550	2005 TY_{94}	—	September 25, 2005	Kitt Peak	Spacewatch	·	1.5 km	MPC · JPL
434551	2005 TC_{97}	—	October 6, 2005	Mount Lemmon	Mount Lemmon Survey	·	890 m	MPC · JPL
434552	2005 TU_{98}	—	October 7, 2005	Socorro	LINEAR	fast	1.4 km	MPC · JPL
434553	2005 TC_{100}	—	October 7, 2005	Mount Lemmon	Mount Lemmon Survey	·	760 m	MPC · JPL
434554	2005 TH_{116}	—	October 7, 2005	Kitt Peak	Spacewatch	·	1.2 km	MPC · JPL
434555	2005 TK_{116}	—	October 7, 2005	Kitt Peak	Spacewatch	NYS	910 m	MPC · JPL
434556	2005 TV_{120}	—	September 29, 2005	Mount Lemmon	Mount Lemmon Survey	MAS	760 m	MPC · JPL
434557	2005 TV_{124}	—	October 7, 2005	Kitt Peak	Spacewatch	·	2.2 km	MPC · JPL
434558	2005 TV_{130}	—	September 29, 2005	Mount Lemmon	Mount Lemmon Survey	H	510 m	MPC · JPL
434559	2005 TR_{139}	—	October 8, 2005	Kitt Peak	Spacewatch	THM	2.7 km	MPC · JPL
434560	2005 TH_{144}	—	September 29, 2005	Kitt Peak	Spacewatch	·	1.0 km	MPC · JPL
434561	2005 TH_{147}	—	September 29, 2005	Kitt Peak	Spacewatch	·	1.1 km	MPC · JPL
434562	2005 TL_{154}	—	October 9, 2005	Kitt Peak	Spacewatch	·	3.1 km	MPC · JPL
434563	2005 TN_{154}	—	October 9, 2005	Kitt Peak	Spacewatch	·	1.2 km	MPC · JPL
434564	2005 TJ_{157}	—	October 9, 2005	Kitt Peak	Spacewatch	·	1.1 km	MPC · JPL
434565	2005 TZ_{177}	—	October 1, 2005	Catalina	CSS	·	4.0 km	MPC · JPL
434566	2005 TU_{188}	—	October 12, 2005	Kitt Peak	Spacewatch	THM	2.6 km	MPC · JPL
434567	2005 TZ_{191}	—	October 5, 2005	Catalina	CSS	H	500 m	MPC · JPL
434568	2005 TC_{195}	—	October 1, 2005	Kitt Peak	Spacewatch	·	1.2 km	MPC · JPL
434569	2005 UU_{2}	—	October 22, 2005	Palomar	NEAT	T_{j} (2.95)	4.1 km	MPC · JPL
434570	2005 UC_{5}	—	October 27, 2005	Kitt Peak	Spacewatch	H	490 m	MPC · JPL
434571	2005 UM_{19}	—	October 22, 2005	Catalina	CSS	·	3.5 km	MPC · JPL
434572	2005 UF_{20}	—	October 22, 2005	Catalina	CSS	·	1.0 km	MPC · JPL
434573	2005 UK_{33}	—	October 7, 2005	Catalina	CSS	·	830 m	MPC · JPL
434574	2005 UE_{36}	—	October 24, 2005	Kitt Peak	Spacewatch	NYS	990 m	MPC · JPL
434575	2005 UW_{36}	—	October 24, 2005	Kitt Peak	Spacewatch	NYS	1.2 km	MPC · JPL
434576	2005 UX_{49}	—	October 23, 2005	Catalina	CSS	·	1.4 km	MPC · JPL
434577	2005 UB_{62}	—	October 25, 2005	Mount Lemmon	Mount Lemmon Survey	MAR	830 m	MPC · JPL
434578	2005 UR_{75}	—	October 24, 2005	Palomar	NEAT	T_{j} (2.96)	5.3 km	MPC · JPL
434579	2005 UM_{84}	—	October 22, 2005	Kitt Peak	Spacewatch	MAS	630 m	MPC · JPL
434580	2005 UT_{93}	—	October 22, 2005	Kitt Peak	Spacewatch	·	1.2 km	MPC · JPL
434581	2005 UO_{106}	—	October 22, 2005	Kitt Peak	Spacewatch	·	1.3 km	MPC · JPL
434582	2005 UW_{120}	—	October 24, 2005	Kitt Peak	Spacewatch	V	510 m	MPC · JPL
434583	2005 UQ_{130}	—	October 24, 2005	Kitt Peak	Spacewatch	·	910 m	MPC · JPL
434584	2005 UH_{146}	—	October 26, 2005	Kitt Peak	Spacewatch	·	1.4 km	MPC · JPL
434585	2005 UE_{159}	—	October 26, 2005	Kitt Peak	Spacewatch	H	620 m	MPC · JPL
434586	2005 UA_{163}	—	October 23, 2005	Kitt Peak	Spacewatch	V	670 m	MPC · JPL
434587	2005 UL_{174}	—	October 24, 2005	Kitt Peak	Spacewatch	·	970 m	MPC · JPL
434588	2005 UK_{183}	—	October 25, 2005	Kitt Peak	Spacewatch	CLA	1.4 km	MPC · JPL
434589	2005 UG_{199}	—	September 26, 2005	Kitt Peak	Spacewatch	·	2.7 km	MPC · JPL
434590	2005 UO_{215}	—	October 22, 2005	Palomar	NEAT	·	1.2 km	MPC · JPL
434591	2005 UH_{221}	—	October 25, 2005	Kitt Peak	Spacewatch	·	1.3 km	MPC · JPL
434592	2005 UU_{222}	—	October 25, 2005	Kitt Peak	Spacewatch	·	1.3 km	MPC · JPL
434593	2005 UL_{224}	—	October 25, 2005	Kitt Peak	Spacewatch	·	1.4 km	MPC · JPL
434594	2005 UT_{225}	—	October 25, 2005	Kitt Peak	Spacewatch	CLA	1.5 km	MPC · JPL
434595	2005 UJ_{228}	—	October 25, 2005	Kitt Peak	Spacewatch	·	990 m	MPC · JPL
434596	2005 UN_{242}	—	October 25, 2005	Kitt Peak	Spacewatch	·	940 m	MPC · JPL
434597	2005 UR_{249}	—	October 28, 2005	Mount Lemmon	Mount Lemmon Survey	·	1.3 km	MPC · JPL
434598	2005 US_{272}	—	October 28, 2005	Kitt Peak	Spacewatch	·	1.4 km	MPC · JPL
434599	2005 UG_{277}	—	October 24, 2005	Kitt Peak	Spacewatch	MAS	690 m	MPC · JPL
434600	2005 UX_{282}	—	October 26, 2005	Kitt Peak	Spacewatch	·	1.1 km	MPC · JPL

== 434601–434700 ==
back to top

Designation			Discovery			Properties		Ref
Permanent	Provisional	Named after	Date	Site	Discoverer(s)	Category	Diam.	Ref
434601	2005 UL_{285}	—	October 26, 2005	Kitt Peak	Spacewatch	·	720 m	MPC · JPL
434602	2005 UT_{293}	—	October 26, 2005	Kitt Peak	Spacewatch	·	1.1 km	MPC · JPL
434603	2005 UR_{305}	—	October 27, 2005	Mount Lemmon	Mount Lemmon Survey	·	1.2 km	MPC · JPL
434604	2005 UM_{313}	—	October 27, 2005	Catalina	CSS	H	590 m	MPC · JPL
434605	2005 UH_{314}	—	September 23, 2005	Kitt Peak	Spacewatch	·	980 m	MPC · JPL
434606	2005 UK_{328}	—	September 23, 2005	Kitt Peak	Spacewatch	·	1.0 km	MPC · JPL
434607	2005 UU_{362}	—	September 24, 2005	Kitt Peak	Spacewatch	·	2.9 km	MPC · JPL
434608	2005 UJ_{363}	—	October 27, 2005	Kitt Peak	Spacewatch	·	980 m	MPC · JPL
434609	2005 UV_{363}	—	October 27, 2005	Kitt Peak	Spacewatch	·	1.1 km	MPC · JPL
434610	2005 UL_{383}	—	October 22, 2005	Kitt Peak	Spacewatch	·	930 m	MPC · JPL
434611	2005 UU_{391}	—	October 30, 2005	Kitt Peak	Spacewatch	CYB	3.6 km	MPC · JPL
434612	2005 UF_{398}	—	October 8, 2005	Catalina	CSS	·	3.5 km	MPC · JPL
434613	2005 UW_{399}	—	October 25, 2005	Mount Lemmon	Mount Lemmon Survey	·	1.5 km	MPC · JPL
434614	2005 UV_{416}	—	October 25, 2005	Kitt Peak	Spacewatch	MAS	660 m	MPC · JPL
434615	2005 UC_{462}	—	October 30, 2005	Kitt Peak	Spacewatch	·	3.0 km	MPC · JPL
434616	2005 UM_{472}	—	October 30, 2005	Kitt Peak	Spacewatch	·	1.4 km	MPC · JPL
434617	2005 UG_{484}	—	October 22, 2005	Catalina	CSS	·	1.5 km	MPC · JPL
434618	2005 UB_{519}	—	October 26, 2005	Apache Point	A. C. Becker	·	1.5 km	MPC · JPL
434619	2005 UT_{528}	—	October 27, 2005	Anderson Mesa	LONEOS	·	1.3 km	MPC · JPL
434620	2005 VD	—	November 1, 2005	Mount Lemmon	Mount Lemmon Survey	damocloid · unusual	9.0 km	MPC · JPL
434621	2005 VB_{5}	—	November 4, 2005	Piszkéstető	K. Sárneczky	·	1.3 km	MPC · JPL
434622	2005 VM_{5}	—	November 8, 2005	Socorro	LINEAR	PHO	1.3 km	MPC · JPL
434623	2005 VU_{13}	—	November 3, 2005	Catalina	CSS	·	3.6 km	MPC · JPL
434624	2005 VA_{18}	—	October 24, 2005	Kitt Peak	Spacewatch	NYS	980 m	MPC · JPL
434625	2005 VA_{31}	—	October 25, 2005	Mount Lemmon	Mount Lemmon Survey	·	1.0 km	MPC · JPL
434626	2005 VT_{31}	—	November 4, 2005	Kitt Peak	Spacewatch	NYS	1.4 km	MPC · JPL
434627	2005 VF_{33}	—	November 1, 2005	Socorro	LINEAR	H	590 m	MPC · JPL
434628	2005 VF_{68}	—	November 1, 2005	Mount Lemmon	Mount Lemmon Survey	·	870 m	MPC · JPL
434629	2005 VX_{107}	—	November 5, 2005	Kitt Peak	Spacewatch	T_{j} (2.92)	4.0 km	MPC · JPL
434630	2005 VE_{111}	—	October 29, 2005	Kitt Peak	Spacewatch	NYS	760 m	MPC · JPL
434631	2005 VB_{114}	—	November 10, 2005	Mount Lemmon	Mount Lemmon Survey	CYB	4.0 km	MPC · JPL
434632	2005 WE	—	November 20, 2005	Socorro	LINEAR	APO +1km	1.2 km	MPC · JPL
434633	2005 WB_{1}	—	November 21, 2005	Kitt Peak	Spacewatch	APO · PHA	310 m	MPC · JPL
434634	2005 WE_{54}	—	November 25, 2005	Mount Lemmon	Mount Lemmon Survey	EUN	1.2 km	MPC · JPL
434635	2005 WJ_{54}	—	November 21, 2005	Catalina	CSS	·	1.9 km	MPC · JPL
434636	2005 WA_{57}	—	November 29, 2005	Junk Bond	D. Healy	·	1.2 km	MPC · JPL
434637	2005 WU_{70}	—	November 26, 2005	Mount Lemmon	Mount Lemmon Survey	·	1.6 km	MPC · JPL
434638	2005 WB_{79}	—	November 25, 2005	Kitt Peak	Spacewatch	·	890 m	MPC · JPL
434639	2005 WO_{100}	—	September 30, 2005	Mount Lemmon	Mount Lemmon Survey	NYS	810 m	MPC · JPL
434640	2005 WE_{144}	—	November 30, 2005	Palomar	NEAT	·	1.0 km	MPC · JPL
434641	2005 WG_{151}	—	November 28, 2005	Kitt Peak	Spacewatch	H	670 m	MPC · JPL
434642	2005 WJ_{186}	—	November 29, 2005	Mount Lemmon	Mount Lemmon Survey	·	1.4 km	MPC · JPL
434643	2005 XC_{3}	—	December 1, 2005	Socorro	LINEAR	V	760 m	MPC · JPL
434644	2005 XZ_{17}	—	December 1, 2005	Kitt Peak	Spacewatch	EUN	1.1 km	MPC · JPL
434645	2005 XZ_{40}	—	December 5, 2005	Kitt Peak	Spacewatch	·	1.1 km	MPC · JPL
434646	2005 XM_{61}	—	November 26, 2005	Kitt Peak	Spacewatch	·	1.1 km	MPC · JPL
434647	2005 XW_{97}	—	December 1, 2005	Kitt Peak	M. W. Buie	CYB	3.2 km	MPC · JPL
434648	2005 YL_{7}	—	December 22, 2005	Kitt Peak	Spacewatch	·	1.6 km	MPC · JPL
434649	2005 YE_{14}	—	December 22, 2005	Kitt Peak	Spacewatch	·	1.1 km	MPC · JPL
434650	2005 YA_{27}	—	December 22, 2005	Kitt Peak	Spacewatch	·	1.3 km	MPC · JPL
434651	2005 YJ_{27}	—	December 22, 2005	Kitt Peak	Spacewatch	CYB	3.6 km	MPC · JPL
434652	2005 YO_{30}	—	December 22, 2005	Catalina	CSS	V	750 m	MPC · JPL
434653	2005 YZ_{57}	—	December 24, 2005	Kitt Peak	Spacewatch	·	1.2 km	MPC · JPL
434654	2005 YM_{65}	—	December 25, 2005	Kitt Peak	Spacewatch	·	1.0 km	MPC · JPL
434655	2005 YT_{66}	—	December 25, 2005	Mount Lemmon	Mount Lemmon Survey	·	1.2 km	MPC · JPL
434656	2005 YR_{90}	—	December 26, 2005	Mount Lemmon	Mount Lemmon Survey	·	1.4 km	MPC · JPL
434657	2005 YU_{91}	—	December 26, 2005	Kitt Peak	Spacewatch	·	1.1 km	MPC · JPL
434658	2005 YF_{98}	—	December 25, 2005	Kitt Peak	Spacewatch	·	940 m	MPC · JPL
434659	2005 YB_{108}	—	December 25, 2005	Kitt Peak	Spacewatch	NYS	1.3 km	MPC · JPL
434660	2005 YU_{115}	—	December 25, 2005	Kitt Peak	Spacewatch	(5)	1.1 km	MPC · JPL
434661	2005 YW_{115}	—	December 25, 2005	Kitt Peak	Spacewatch	·	1.2 km	MPC · JPL
434662	2005 YO_{118}	—	December 25, 2005	Kitt Peak	Spacewatch	·	1.7 km	MPC · JPL
434663	2005 YJ_{125}	—	December 26, 2005	Kitt Peak	Spacewatch	·	1.7 km	MPC · JPL
434664	2005 YM_{125}	—	December 1, 2005	Mount Lemmon	Mount Lemmon Survey	·	1.0 km	MPC · JPL
434665	2005 YC_{134}	—	December 26, 2005	Kitt Peak	Spacewatch	(5)	1.1 km	MPC · JPL
434666	2005 YN_{173}	—	December 24, 2005	Socorro	LINEAR	·	2.6 km	MPC · JPL
434667	2005 YU_{248}	—	December 10, 2005	Kitt Peak	Spacewatch	·	1.4 km	MPC · JPL
434668	2005 YL_{275}	—	December 30, 2005	Catalina	CSS	·	2.1 km	MPC · JPL
434669	2005 YG_{291}	—	December 28, 2005	Mount Lemmon	Mount Lemmon Survey	·	1.5 km	MPC · JPL
434670	2006 AN_{1}	—	January 2, 2006	Socorro	LINEAR	·	1.4 km	MPC · JPL
434671	2006 AP_{8}	—	January 2, 2006	Socorro	LINEAR	·	1.1 km	MPC · JPL
434672	2006 AD_{37}	—	January 4, 2006	Kitt Peak	Spacewatch	(5)	1 km	MPC · JPL
434673	2006 AD_{46}	—	January 5, 2006	Kitt Peak	Spacewatch	·	1.0 km	MPC · JPL
434674	2006 AR_{52}	—	December 28, 2005	Kitt Peak	Spacewatch	(5)	1.2 km	MPC · JPL
434675	2006 AP_{75}	—	January 4, 2006	Kitt Peak	Spacewatch	·	870 m	MPC · JPL
434676	2006 AV_{90}	—	January 6, 2006	Kitt Peak	Spacewatch	MAR	1.1 km	MPC · JPL
434677	2006 BZ_{7}	—	January 23, 2006	Catalina	CSS	APO +1km · PHA	1.1 km	MPC · JPL
434678 Curlin	2006 BE_{8}	Curlin	January 22, 2006	Nogales	J.-C. Merlin	(5)	2.2 km	MPC · JPL
434679	2006 BF_{20}	—	January 22, 2006	Mount Lemmon	Mount Lemmon Survey	·	820 m	MPC · JPL
434680	2006 BR_{20}	—	January 22, 2006	Mount Lemmon	Mount Lemmon Survey	·	1.1 km	MPC · JPL
434681	2006 BO_{21}	—	January 22, 2006	Mount Lemmon	Mount Lemmon Survey	·	1.7 km	MPC · JPL
434682	2006 BN_{22}	—	January 22, 2006	Mount Lemmon	Mount Lemmon Survey	·	1.1 km	MPC · JPL
434683	2006 BY_{25}	—	January 20, 2006	Catalina	CSS	·	1.8 km	MPC · JPL
434684	2006 BQ_{29}	—	January 23, 2006	Mount Nyukasa	Japan Aerospace Exploration Agency	·	1.4 km	MPC · JPL
434685	2006 BP_{39}	—	January 19, 2006	Catalina	CSS	·	1.5 km	MPC · JPL
434686	2006 BE_{40}	—	January 20, 2006	Kitt Peak	Spacewatch	·	1.4 km	MPC · JPL
434687	2006 BY_{53}	—	January 25, 2006	Kitt Peak	Spacewatch	·	1.6 km	MPC · JPL
434688	2006 BH_{54}	—	January 25, 2006	Kitt Peak	Spacewatch	·	1.4 km	MPC · JPL
434689	2006 BC_{70}	—	January 23, 2006	Kitt Peak	Spacewatch	·	1.4 km	MPC · JPL
434690	2006 BA_{71}	—	January 23, 2006	Kitt Peak	Spacewatch	·	1.2 km	MPC · JPL
434691	2006 BK_{90}	—	January 25, 2006	Kitt Peak	Spacewatch	·	2.2 km	MPC · JPL
434692	2006 BR_{97}	—	January 5, 2006	Catalina	CSS	RAF	1.1 km	MPC · JPL
434693	2006 BT_{116}	—	January 26, 2006	Kitt Peak	Spacewatch	·	1.2 km	MPC · JPL
434694	2006 BR_{136}	—	January 25, 2006	Kitt Peak	Spacewatch	·	1.3 km	MPC · JPL
434695	2006 BN_{190}	—	January 28, 2006	Kitt Peak	Spacewatch	EUN	1.3 km	MPC · JPL
434696	2006 BY_{196}	—	January 9, 2006	Mount Lemmon	Mount Lemmon Survey	·	1.8 km	MPC · JPL
434697	2006 BS_{207}	—	January 31, 2006	Goodricke-Pigott	R. A. Tucker	(5)	1.5 km	MPC · JPL
434698	2006 BS_{211}	—	January 31, 2006	Kitt Peak	Spacewatch	·	1.8 km	MPC · JPL
434699	2006 BT_{243}	—	January 31, 2006	Kitt Peak	Spacewatch	·	2.4 km	MPC · JPL
434700	2006 BR_{258}	—	January 31, 2006	Mount Lemmon	Mount Lemmon Survey	·	2.6 km	MPC · JPL

== 434701–434800 ==
back to top

Designation			Discovery			Properties		Ref
Permanent	Provisional	Named after	Date	Site	Discoverer(s)	Category	Diam.	Ref
434701	2006 BD_{268}	—	January 26, 2006	Catalina	CSS	·	1.8 km	MPC · JPL
434702	2006 BN_{280}	—	January 30, 2006	Kitt Peak	Spacewatch	·	1.4 km	MPC · JPL
434703	2006 BG_{283}	—	January 26, 2006	Catalina	CSS	·	2.1 km	MPC · JPL
434704	2006 CD_{28}	—	February 2, 2006	Kitt Peak	Spacewatch	·	1.7 km	MPC · JPL
434705	2006 CU_{34}	—	February 2, 2006	Mount Lemmon	Mount Lemmon Survey	·	1.1 km	MPC · JPL
434706	2006 CG_{41}	—	February 2, 2006	Kitt Peak	Spacewatch	·	2.1 km	MPC · JPL
434707 Oyfnpripetshik	2006 CH_{49}	Oyfnpripetshik	November 29, 2005	Mount Lemmon	Mount Lemmon Survey	T_{j} (2.94)	5.6 km	MPC · JPL
434708	2006 CQ_{52}	—	January 8, 2006	Mount Lemmon	Mount Lemmon Survey	·	1.2 km	MPC · JPL
434709	2006 CJ_{69}	—	February 3, 2006	Mauna Kea	P. A. Wiegert, Papadimos, A.	res · 3:5	125 km	MPC · JPL
434710	2006 DT_{10}	—	February 4, 2006	Socorro	LINEAR	·	2.1 km	MPC · JPL
434711	2006 DO_{12}	—	February 3, 2006	Mount Lemmon	Mount Lemmon Survey	·	1.6 km	MPC · JPL
434712	2006 DN_{17}	—	February 20, 2006	Kitt Peak	Spacewatch	·	1.3 km	MPC · JPL
434713	2006 DS_{24}	—	February 1, 2006	Mount Lemmon	Mount Lemmon Survey	·	1.4 km	MPC · JPL
434714	2006 DD_{25}	—	February 20, 2006	Kitt Peak	Spacewatch	·	1.6 km	MPC · JPL
434715	2006 DE_{36}	—	February 20, 2006	Mount Lemmon	Mount Lemmon Survey	·	1.8 km	MPC · JPL
434716	2006 DA_{58}	—	February 24, 2006	Mount Lemmon	Mount Lemmon Survey	·	1.7 km	MPC · JPL
434717	2006 DT_{58}	—	February 24, 2006	Kitt Peak	Spacewatch	·	1.5 km	MPC · JPL
434718	2006 DS_{61}	—	February 24, 2006	Mount Lemmon	Mount Lemmon Survey	·	2.5 km	MPC · JPL
434719	2006 DZ_{61}	—	February 24, 2006	Socorro	LINEAR	·	1.7 km	MPC · JPL
434720	2006 DN_{85}	—	January 30, 2006	Kitt Peak	Spacewatch	·	1.1 km	MPC · JPL
434721	2006 DU_{137}	—	February 25, 2006	Kitt Peak	Spacewatch	·	1.3 km	MPC · JPL
434722	2006 DB_{145}	—	February 25, 2006	Mount Lemmon	Mount Lemmon Survey	·	1.4 km	MPC · JPL
434723	2006 DZ_{165}	—	February 27, 2006	Kitt Peak	Spacewatch	·	1.5 km	MPC · JPL
434724	2006 DK_{179}	—	January 10, 2006	Mount Lemmon	Mount Lemmon Survey	·	1.3 km	MPC · JPL
434725	2006 DO_{182}	—	February 27, 2006	Mount Lemmon	Mount Lemmon Survey	·	1.3 km	MPC · JPL
434726	2006 DX_{186}	—	February 27, 2006	Kitt Peak	Spacewatch	JUN	1.0 km	MPC · JPL
434727	2006 DA_{190}	—	February 27, 2006	Kitt Peak	Spacewatch	·	1.3 km	MPC · JPL
434728	2006 DP_{201}	—	February 28, 2006	Socorro	LINEAR	·	1.9 km	MPC · JPL
434729	2006 ED_{13}	—	March 2, 2006	Kitt Peak	Spacewatch	·	1.4 km	MPC · JPL
434730	2006 EA_{34}	—	March 3, 2006	Kitt Peak	Spacewatch	·	1.4 km	MPC · JPL
434731	2006 EX_{36}	—	March 3, 2006	Mount Lemmon	Mount Lemmon Survey	·	1.5 km	MPC · JPL
434732	2006 EP_{48}	—	February 25, 2006	Kitt Peak	Spacewatch	(5)	1.1 km	MPC · JPL
434733	2006 EP_{73}	—	March 3, 2006	Kitt Peak	Spacewatch	·	2.0 km	MPC · JPL
434734	2006 FX	—	March 24, 2006	Catalina	CSS	APO · PHA	350 m	MPC · JPL
434735	2006 FT_{11}	—	March 23, 2006	Kitt Peak	Spacewatch	EUN	1.1 km	MPC · JPL
434736	2006 FP_{16}	—	March 23, 2006	Mount Lemmon	Mount Lemmon Survey	·	2.0 km	MPC · JPL
434737	2006 FK_{21}	—	March 24, 2006	Mount Lemmon	Mount Lemmon Survey	·	1.2 km	MPC · JPL
434738	2006 FZ_{33}	—	March 25, 2006	Kitt Peak	Spacewatch	·	3.1 km	MPC · JPL
434739	2006 FW_{37}	—	March 3, 2006	Kitt Peak	Spacewatch	·	1.3 km	MPC · JPL
434740	2006 GZ	—	April 2, 2006	Kitt Peak	Spacewatch	APO	1 km	MPC · JPL
434741	2006 GQ_{23}	—	April 2, 2006	Kitt Peak	Spacewatch	EUN	1.1 km	MPC · JPL
434742	2006 GB_{42}	—	April 8, 2006	Catalina	CSS	·	1.6 km	MPC · JPL
434743	2006 GV_{43}	—	March 4, 2006	Kitt Peak	Spacewatch	·	1.3 km	MPC · JPL
434744	2006 GW_{52}	—	April 8, 2006	Catalina	CSS	·	1.9 km	MPC · JPL
434745	2006 GF_{54}	—	April 8, 2006	Kitt Peak	Spacewatch	·	2.0 km	MPC · JPL
434746	2006 GN_{54}	—	April 2, 2006	Kitt Peak	Spacewatch	·	1.8 km	MPC · JPL
434747	2006 GG_{55}	—	April 2, 2006	Kitt Peak	Spacewatch	·	2.2 km	MPC · JPL
434748	2006 HU_{11}	—	April 19, 2006	Kitt Peak	Spacewatch	WIT	1.4 km	MPC · JPL
434749	2006 HQ_{22}	—	April 20, 2006	Kitt Peak	Spacewatch	·	1.9 km	MPC · JPL
434750	2006 HD_{42}	—	April 21, 2006	Kitt Peak	Spacewatch	JUN	1.2 km	MPC · JPL
434751	2006 HV_{57}	—	April 29, 2006	Siding Spring	SSS	AMO	680 m	MPC · JPL
434752	2006 HH_{71}	—	April 25, 2006	Kitt Peak	Spacewatch	·	1.6 km	MPC · JPL
434753	2006 HY_{75}	—	April 25, 2006	Kitt Peak	Spacewatch	JUN	920 m	MPC · JPL
434754	2006 HF_{77}	—	January 14, 1996	Kitt Peak	Spacewatch	·	1.8 km	MPC · JPL
434755	2006 HA_{80}	—	April 26, 2006	Kitt Peak	Spacewatch	·	2.3 km	MPC · JPL
434756	2006 HA_{84}	—	April 26, 2006	Kitt Peak	Spacewatch	·	2.3 km	MPC · JPL
434757	2006 HN_{91}	—	April 29, 2006	Kitt Peak	Spacewatch	DOR	2.2 km	MPC · JPL
434758	2006 HP_{95}	—	April 30, 2006	Kitt Peak	Spacewatch	·	1.4 km	MPC · JPL
434759	2006 HG_{104}	—	April 30, 2006	Kitt Peak	Spacewatch	·	1.8 km	MPC · JPL
434760	2006 HO_{115}	—	March 25, 2006	Kitt Peak	Spacewatch	·	1.5 km	MPC · JPL
434761	2006 HL_{116}	—	April 26, 2006	Kitt Peak	Spacewatch	·	1.4 km	MPC · JPL
434762	2006 HA_{153}	—	April 20, 2006	Kitt Peak	Spacewatch	T_{j} (2.92)	6.7 km	MPC · JPL
434763	2006 HV_{153}	—	April 30, 2006	Catalina	CSS	·	3.0 km	MPC · JPL
434764	2006 JF_{6}	—	May 2, 2006	Mount Nyukasa	Japan Aerospace Exploration Agency	·	1.9 km	MPC · JPL
434765	2006 JZ_{8}	—	May 1, 2006	Kitt Peak	Spacewatch	·	2.0 km	MPC · JPL
434766	2006 JV_{13}	—	May 3, 2006	Kitt Peak	Spacewatch	·	1.7 km	MPC · JPL
434767	2006 JR_{33}	—	May 4, 2006	Mount Lemmon	Mount Lemmon Survey	AGN	1.1 km	MPC · JPL
434768	2006 JJ_{36}	—	May 4, 2006	Kitt Peak	Spacewatch	·	1.8 km	MPC · JPL
434769	2006 KC_{26}	—	February 2, 2006	Kitt Peak	Spacewatch	·	2.2 km	MPC · JPL
434770	2006 KU_{26}	—	May 20, 2006	Kitt Peak	Spacewatch	·	1.4 km	MPC · JPL
434771	2006 KN_{41}	—	May 19, 2006	Palomar	NEAT	·	2.0 km	MPC · JPL
434772	2006 KT_{44}	—	May 21, 2006	Kitt Peak	Spacewatch	·	1.7 km	MPC · JPL
434773	2006 KC_{58}	—	May 22, 2006	Kitt Peak	Spacewatch	·	2.3 km	MPC · JPL
434774	2006 KU_{62}	—	May 22, 2006	Kitt Peak	Spacewatch	MRX	950 m	MPC · JPL
434775	2006 KU_{68}	—	May 20, 2006	Kitt Peak	Spacewatch	·	2.9 km	MPC · JPL
434776	2006 KD_{69}	—	May 21, 2006	Catalina	CSS	·	3.7 km	MPC · JPL
434777	2006 KQ_{72}	—	May 23, 2006	Kitt Peak	Spacewatch	·	2.1 km	MPC · JPL
434778	2006 KK_{87}	—	October 21, 2003	Kitt Peak	Spacewatch	·	2.0 km	MPC · JPL
434779	2006 KR_{100}	—	May 24, 2006	Kitt Peak	Spacewatch	·	2.1 km	MPC · JPL
434780	2006 KK_{108}	—	May 31, 2006	Mount Lemmon	Mount Lemmon Survey	·	1.9 km	MPC · JPL
434781	2006 KP_{116}	—	May 29, 2006	Socorro	LINEAR	·	1.9 km	MPC · JPL
434782	2006 MR_{11}	—	June 18, 2006	Kitt Peak	Spacewatch	·	1.8 km	MPC · JPL
434783	2006 MT_{14}	—	June 21, 2006	Catalina	CSS	·	1.6 km	MPC · JPL
434784	2006 OL_{1}	—	May 30, 2006	Mount Lemmon	Mount Lemmon Survey	·	540 m	MPC · JPL
434785	2006 OJ_{21}	—	July 21, 2006	Mount Lemmon	Mount Lemmon Survey	·	2.1 km	MPC · JPL
434786	2006 PW	—	August 12, 2006	Palomar	NEAT	APO +1km	840 m	MPC · JPL
434787	2006 QW_{19}	—	August 18, 2006	Socorro	LINEAR	·	2.3 km	MPC · JPL
434788	2006 QS_{38}	—	August 18, 2006	Anderson Mesa	LONEOS	·	730 m	MPC · JPL
434789	2006 QT_{68}	—	August 21, 2006	Kitt Peak	Spacewatch	KOR	1.5 km	MPC · JPL
434790	2006 QQ_{73}	—	August 21, 2006	Kitt Peak	Spacewatch	·	2.7 km	MPC · JPL
434791	2006 QO_{109}	—	August 19, 2006	Kitt Peak	Spacewatch	·	570 m	MPC · JPL
434792	2006 QA_{122}	—	August 29, 2006	Catalina	CSS	·	710 m	MPC · JPL
434793	2006 QG_{166}	—	August 29, 2006	Catalina	CSS	·	3.5 km	MPC · JPL
434794	2006 RC_{17}	—	July 25, 2006	Mount Lemmon	Mount Lemmon Survey	·	670 m	MPC · JPL
434795	2006 RL_{17}	—	September 14, 2006	Palomar	NEAT	·	670 m	MPC · JPL
434796	2006 RL_{27}	—	July 21, 2006	Mount Lemmon	Mount Lemmon Survey	·	2.8 km	MPC · JPL
434797	2006 RO_{38}	—	September 14, 2006	Catalina	CSS	·	650 m	MPC · JPL
434798	2006 RC_{42}	—	September 14, 2006	Kitt Peak	Spacewatch	·	2.1 km	MPC · JPL
434799	2006 RR_{43}	—	September 14, 2006	Kitt Peak	Spacewatch	·	2.6 km	MPC · JPL
434800	2006 RR_{48}	—	September 14, 2006	Kitt Peak	Spacewatch	·	770 m	MPC · JPL

== 434801–434900 ==
back to top

Designation			Discovery			Properties		Ref
Permanent	Provisional	Named after	Date	Site	Discoverer(s)	Category	Diam.	Ref
434801	2006 RJ_{52}	—	September 14, 2006	Kitt Peak	Spacewatch	·	2.4 km	MPC · JPL
434802	2006 RL_{53}	—	September 14, 2006	Kitt Peak	Spacewatch	EOS	1.7 km	MPC · JPL
434803	2006 RY_{58}	—	September 15, 2006	Kitt Peak	Spacewatch	EOS	1.9 km	MPC · JPL
434804	2006 RX_{59}	—	September 15, 2006	Kitt Peak	Spacewatch	EOS	2.3 km	MPC · JPL
434805	2006 RO_{75}	—	September 15, 2006	Kitt Peak	Spacewatch	·	590 m	MPC · JPL
434806	2006 RP_{78}	—	September 15, 2006	Kitt Peak	Spacewatch	EOS	1.7 km	MPC · JPL
434807	2006 RX_{78}	—	September 15, 2006	Kitt Peak	Spacewatch	·	520 m	MPC · JPL
434808	2006 RP_{81}	—	September 15, 2006	Kitt Peak	Spacewatch	·	3.0 km	MPC · JPL
434809	2006 RO_{82}	—	September 15, 2006	Kitt Peak	Spacewatch	·	2.4 km	MPC · JPL
434810	2006 RX_{84}	—	September 15, 2006	Kitt Peak	Spacewatch	·	2.6 km	MPC · JPL
434811	2006 RF_{86}	—	September 15, 2006	Kitt Peak	Spacewatch	·	2.6 km	MPC · JPL
434812	2006 RV_{88}	—	September 15, 2006	Kitt Peak	Spacewatch	EOS	2.0 km	MPC · JPL
434813	2006 RT_{89}	—	September 15, 2006	Kitt Peak	Spacewatch	·	2.4 km	MPC · JPL
434814	2006 RT_{91}	—	September 15, 2006	Kitt Peak	Spacewatch	·	2.8 km	MPC · JPL
434815	2006 RZ_{91}	—	September 15, 2006	Kitt Peak	Spacewatch	·	1.9 km	MPC · JPL
434816	2006 RH_{92}	—	September 15, 2006	Kitt Peak	Spacewatch	·	3.6 km	MPC · JPL
434817	2006 RM_{94}	—	September 15, 2006	Kitt Peak	Spacewatch	·	700 m	MPC · JPL
434818	2006 RO_{94}	—	September 15, 2006	Kitt Peak	Spacewatch	·	2.0 km	MPC · JPL
434819	2006 RT_{96}	—	September 15, 2006	Kitt Peak	Spacewatch	·	1.7 km	MPC · JPL
434820	2006 RV_{97}	—	September 15, 2006	Kitt Peak	Spacewatch	NYS	740 m	MPC · JPL
434821	2006 RB_{99}	—	September 14, 2006	Kitt Peak	Spacewatch	·	2.1 km	MPC · JPL
434822	2006 RK_{101}	—	September 14, 2006	Catalina	CSS	·	3.2 km	MPC · JPL
434823	2006 RR_{105}	—	September 14, 2006	Mauna Kea	Masiero, J.	·	530 m	MPC · JPL
434824	2006 RA_{122}	—	September 15, 2006	Kitt Peak	Spacewatch	·	660 m	MPC · JPL
434825	2006 SG_{16}	—	September 17, 2006	Catalina	CSS	·	2.7 km	MPC · JPL
434826	2006 SX_{22}	—	September 17, 2006	Anderson Mesa	LONEOS	·	3.5 km	MPC · JPL
434827	2006 SP_{25}	—	September 16, 2006	Anderson Mesa	LONEOS	EOS	2.1 km	MPC · JPL
434828	2006 SX_{30}	—	September 17, 2006	Kitt Peak	Spacewatch	·	650 m	MPC · JPL
434829	2006 SH_{35}	—	September 17, 2006	Kitt Peak	Spacewatch	·	2.1 km	MPC · JPL
434830	2006 SR_{35}	—	September 17, 2006	Kitt Peak	Spacewatch	EOS	1.6 km	MPC · JPL
434831	2006 SF_{39}	—	September 18, 2006	Socorro	LINEAR	·	3.5 km	MPC · JPL
434832	2006 SL_{48}	—	September 19, 2006	Kitt Peak	Spacewatch	·	3.0 km	MPC · JPL
434833	2006 SW_{56}	—	September 20, 2006	Catalina	CSS	·	880 m	MPC · JPL
434834	2006 SX_{56}	—	September 20, 2006	Catalina	CSS	·	580 m	MPC · JPL
434835	2006 SG_{70}	—	September 19, 2006	Kitt Peak	Spacewatch	·	2.8 km	MPC · JPL
434836	2006 SR_{72}	—	September 19, 2006	Kitt Peak	Spacewatch	VER	2.5 km	MPC · JPL
434837	2006 SG_{83}	—	September 18, 2006	Kitt Peak	Spacewatch	THM	2.3 km	MPC · JPL
434838	2006 SE_{93}	—	September 18, 2006	Kitt Peak	Spacewatch	·	580 m	MPC · JPL
434839	2006 SS_{95}	—	September 18, 2006	Kitt Peak	Spacewatch	·	2.9 km	MPC · JPL
434840	2006 ST_{97}	—	September 18, 2006	Kitt Peak	Spacewatch	·	1.8 km	MPC · JPL
434841	2006 SN_{104}	—	September 19, 2006	Kitt Peak	Spacewatch	·	2.3 km	MPC · JPL
434842	2006 SO_{121}	—	July 22, 2006	Mount Lemmon	Mount Lemmon Survey	·	2.3 km	MPC · JPL
434843	2006 SW_{123}	—	September 19, 2006	Catalina	CSS	·	4.7 km	MPC · JPL
434844	2006 SZ_{124}	—	September 16, 2006	Anderson Mesa	LONEOS	·	610 m	MPC · JPL
434845	2006 SN_{126}	—	September 21, 2006	Anderson Mesa	LONEOS	·	900 m	MPC · JPL
434846	2006 SE_{141}	—	September 25, 2006	Anderson Mesa	LONEOS	·	800 m	MPC · JPL
434847	2006 SJ_{143}	—	September 19, 2006	Kitt Peak	Spacewatch	·	890 m	MPC · JPL
434848	2006 SX_{150}	—	September 19, 2006	Kitt Peak	Spacewatch	·	2.5 km	MPC · JPL
434849	2006 SG_{152}	—	September 19, 2006	Kitt Peak	Spacewatch	·	1.6 km	MPC · JPL
434850	2006 SV_{157}	—	September 23, 2006	Kitt Peak	Spacewatch	·	2.2 km	MPC · JPL
434851	2006 SX_{158}	—	July 22, 2006	Mount Lemmon	Mount Lemmon Survey	·	3.1 km	MPC · JPL
434852	2006 SN_{164}	—	September 25, 2006	Kitt Peak	Spacewatch	·	1.8 km	MPC · JPL
434853	2006 SO_{165}	—	September 25, 2006	Kitt Peak	Spacewatch	EOS	1.6 km	MPC · JPL
434854	2006 SQ_{191}	—	September 15, 2006	Kitt Peak	Spacewatch	·	2.9 km	MPC · JPL
434855	2006 SM_{203}	—	September 16, 2006	Kitt Peak	Spacewatch	EOS	1.8 km	MPC · JPL
434856	2006 ST_{204}	—	September 25, 2006	Mount Lemmon	Mount Lemmon Survey	·	2.1 km	MPC · JPL
434857	2006 SC_{214}	—	September 19, 2006	Anderson Mesa	LONEOS	·	1.9 km	MPC · JPL
434858	2006 ST_{214}	—	September 27, 2006	Mount Lemmon	Mount Lemmon Survey	·	3.9 km	MPC · JPL
434859	2006 SF_{221}	—	September 25, 2006	Mount Lemmon	Mount Lemmon Survey	·	1.9 km	MPC · JPL
434860	2006 SH_{231}	—	September 26, 2006	Kitt Peak	Spacewatch	EOS	2.2 km	MPC · JPL
434861	2006 SD_{260}	—	September 26, 2006	Kitt Peak	Spacewatch	·	2.2 km	MPC · JPL
434862	2006 SL_{263}	—	September 26, 2006	Kitt Peak	Spacewatch	·	2.3 km	MPC · JPL
434863	2006 SX_{265}	—	April 6, 2005	Kitt Peak	Spacewatch	·	880 m	MPC · JPL
434864	2006 SH_{266}	—	September 26, 2006	Kitt Peak	Spacewatch	EOS	1.9 km	MPC · JPL
434865	2006 SO_{269}	—	September 26, 2006	Mount Lemmon	Mount Lemmon Survey	·	3.6 km	MPC · JPL
434866	2006 SW_{271}	—	September 27, 2006	Mount Lemmon	Mount Lemmon Survey	·	3.5 km	MPC · JPL
434867	2006 SA_{285}	—	September 29, 2006	Anderson Mesa	LONEOS	·	750 m	MPC · JPL
434868	2006 SR_{287}	—	September 14, 2006	Catalina	CSS	EOS	2.4 km	MPC · JPL
434869	2006 SH_{297}	—	September 25, 2006	Kitt Peak	Spacewatch	EOS	1.8 km	MPC · JPL
434870	2006 SJ_{312}	—	September 27, 2006	Mount Lemmon	Mount Lemmon Survey	EOS	1.9 km	MPC · JPL
434871	2006 SK_{316}	—	September 27, 2006	Kitt Peak	Spacewatch	·	1.5 km	MPC · JPL
434872	2006 SM_{319}	—	September 27, 2006	Kitt Peak	Spacewatch	·	3.1 km	MPC · JPL
434873	2006 SR_{323}	—	October 20, 1995	Kitt Peak	Spacewatch	EOS	1.8 km	MPC · JPL
434874	2006 SZ_{325}	—	September 19, 2006	Kitt Peak	Spacewatch	·	690 m	MPC · JPL
434875	2006 SA_{328}	—	September 27, 2006	Kitt Peak	Spacewatch	·	670 m	MPC · JPL
434876	2006 SD_{334}	—	September 28, 2006	Kitt Peak	Spacewatch	EOS	1.6 km	MPC · JPL
434877	2006 SY_{335}	—	September 28, 2006	Kitt Peak	Spacewatch	·	1.7 km	MPC · JPL
434878	2006 SS_{343}	—	September 28, 2006	Kitt Peak	Spacewatch	·	2.9 km	MPC · JPL
434879	2006 SR_{345}	—	September 28, 2006	Kitt Peak	Spacewatch	·	730 m	MPC · JPL
434880	2006 SF_{350}	—	September 30, 2006	Kitt Peak	Spacewatch	·	810 m	MPC · JPL
434881	2006 SR_{350}	—	August 29, 2006	Kitt Peak	Spacewatch	·	740 m	MPC · JPL
434882	2006 SM_{356}	—	September 30, 2006	Catalina	CSS	·	640 m	MPC · JPL
434883	2006 SZ_{357}	—	September 30, 2006	Mount Lemmon	Mount Lemmon Survey	EOS	2.3 km	MPC · JPL
434884	2006 SG_{360}	—	September 30, 2006	Mount Lemmon	Mount Lemmon Survey	VER	2.9 km	MPC · JPL
434885	2006 SY_{360}	—	September 30, 2006	Mount Lemmon	Mount Lemmon Survey	·	3.8 km	MPC · JPL
434886	2006 SS_{378}	—	September 18, 2006	Apache Point	A. C. Becker	·	2.5 km	MPC · JPL
434887	2006 SU_{378}	—	September 18, 2006	Apache Point	A. C. Becker	·	2.7 km	MPC · JPL
434888	2006 SF_{379}	—	September 19, 2006	Apache Point	SDSS Collaboration	(31811)	2.2 km	MPC · JPL
434889	2006 SZ_{396}	—	September 18, 2006	Kitt Peak	Spacewatch	·	580 m	MPC · JPL
434890	2006 SQ_{397}	—	September 25, 2006	Mount Lemmon	Mount Lemmon Survey	VER	2.4 km	MPC · JPL
434891	2006 SN_{398}	—	September 16, 2006	Catalina	CSS	·	1.1 km	MPC · JPL
434892	2006 SR_{400}	—	September 25, 2006	Kitt Peak	Spacewatch	·	2.8 km	MPC · JPL
434893	2006 SG_{402}	—	September 19, 2006	Kitt Peak	Spacewatch	·	2.8 km	MPC · JPL
434894	2006 SV_{404}	—	September 30, 2006	Mount Lemmon	Mount Lemmon Survey	·	3.0 km	MPC · JPL
434895	2006 SJ_{407}	—	September 19, 2006	Kitt Peak	Spacewatch	·	660 m	MPC · JPL
434896	2006 SC_{409}	—	September 28, 2006	Catalina	CSS	·	3.6 km	MPC · JPL
434897	2006 SV_{410}	—	September 19, 2006	Kitt Peak	Spacewatch	·	2.7 km	MPC · JPL
434898	2006 SG_{411}	—	September 28, 2006	Kitt Peak	Spacewatch	V	540 m	MPC · JPL
434899	2006 SZ_{411}	—	September 28, 2006	Catalina	CSS	PHO	720 m	MPC · JPL
434900	2006 TU	—	October 1, 2006	Piszkéstető	K. Sárneczky	·	2.2 km	MPC · JPL

== 434901–435000 ==
back to top

Designation			Discovery			Properties		Ref
Permanent	Provisional	Named after	Date	Site	Discoverer(s)	Category	Diam.	Ref
434901	2006 TK_{2}	—	October 2, 2006	Mount Lemmon	Mount Lemmon Survey	EOS	1.9 km	MPC · JPL
434902	2006 TF_{8}	—	October 4, 2006	Mount Lemmon	Mount Lemmon Survey	·	3.2 km	MPC · JPL
434903	2006 TP_{25}	—	October 12, 2006	Kitt Peak	Spacewatch	·	890 m	MPC · JPL
434904	2006 TA_{27}	—	October 12, 2006	Kitt Peak	Spacewatch	VER	2.4 km	MPC · JPL
434905	2006 TR_{37}	—	October 12, 2006	Kitt Peak	Spacewatch	·	2.4 km	MPC · JPL
434906	2006 TF_{42}	—	September 25, 2006	Mount Lemmon	Mount Lemmon Survey	·	730 m	MPC · JPL
434907	2006 TS_{45}	—	October 12, 2006	Kitt Peak	Spacewatch	·	2.8 km	MPC · JPL
434908	2006 TK_{51}	—	October 12, 2006	Kitt Peak	Spacewatch	·	3.8 km	MPC · JPL
434909	2006 TT_{51}	—	October 12, 2006	Kitt Peak	Spacewatch	·	3.2 km	MPC · JPL
434910	2006 TG_{54}	—	October 12, 2006	Kitt Peak	Spacewatch	·	920 m	MPC · JPL
434911	2006 TD_{63}	—	October 10, 2006	Palomar	NEAT	·	1.0 km	MPC · JPL
434912	2006 TW_{65}	—	September 18, 2006	Kitt Peak	Spacewatch	·	3.1 km	MPC · JPL
434913	2006 TE_{84}	—	October 13, 2006	Kitt Peak	Spacewatch	·	4.2 km	MPC · JPL
434914	2006 TX_{85}	—	October 13, 2006	Kitt Peak	Spacewatch	·	770 m	MPC · JPL
434915	2006 TE_{86}	—	October 13, 2006	Kitt Peak	Spacewatch	TIR	3.0 km	MPC · JPL
434916	2006 TS_{86}	—	October 13, 2006	Kitt Peak	Spacewatch	·	760 m	MPC · JPL
434917	2006 TE_{87}	—	October 13, 2006	Kitt Peak	Spacewatch	·	3.5 km	MPC · JPL
434918	2006 TG_{88}	—	October 2, 2006	Mount Lemmon	Mount Lemmon Survey	·	2.3 km	MPC · JPL
434919	2006 TT_{88}	—	October 13, 2006	Kitt Peak	Spacewatch	·	3.0 km	MPC · JPL
434920	2006 TS_{89}	—	October 13, 2006	Kitt Peak	Spacewatch	·	760 m	MPC · JPL
434921	2006 TS_{94}	—	October 15, 2006	Lulin	Lin, C.-S., Q. Ye	·	4.3 km	MPC · JPL
434922	2006 TE_{98}	—	October 15, 2006	Kitt Peak	Spacewatch	·	4.3 km	MPC · JPL
434923	2006 TN_{99}	—	October 15, 2006	Kitt Peak	Spacewatch	·	4.7 km	MPC · JPL
434924	2006 TP_{100}	—	October 2, 2006	Mount Lemmon	Mount Lemmon Survey	·	3.0 km	MPC · JPL
434925	2006 TG_{102}	—	October 15, 2006	Kitt Peak	Spacewatch	H	370 m	MPC · JPL
434926	2006 TJ_{104}	—	October 15, 2006	Kitt Peak	Spacewatch	·	2.1 km	MPC · JPL
434927	2006 TB_{107}	—	October 2, 2006	Mount Lemmon	Mount Lemmon Survey	·	3.2 km	MPC · JPL
434928	2006 TE_{111}	—	October 1, 2006	Apache Point	A. C. Becker	·	2.1 km	MPC · JPL
434929	2006 TO_{116}	—	October 2, 2006	Apache Point	A. C. Becker	·	2.3 km	MPC · JPL
434930	2006 TV_{117}	—	October 3, 2006	Apache Point	A. C. Becker	·	2.6 km	MPC · JPL
434931	2006 TL_{119}	—	October 11, 2006	Apache Point	A. C. Becker	EOS	1.9 km	MPC · JPL
434932	2006 TS_{119}	—	October 11, 2006	Apache Point	A. C. Becker	·	2.6 km	MPC · JPL
434933	2006 TB_{121}	—	October 12, 2006	Apache Point	A. C. Becker	EOS	2.2 km	MPC · JPL
434934	2006 TF_{121}	—	October 12, 2006	Apache Point	A. C. Becker	·	2.9 km	MPC · JPL
434935	2006 TO_{124}	—	October 3, 2006	Mount Lemmon	Mount Lemmon Survey	·	800 m	MPC · JPL
434936	2006 TW_{124}	—	October 4, 2006	Mount Lemmon	Mount Lemmon Survey	·	860 m	MPC · JPL
434937	2006 TA_{125}	—	October 4, 2006	Mount Lemmon	Mount Lemmon Survey	·	4.3 km	MPC · JPL
434938	2006 TV_{126}	—	October 2, 2006	Mount Lemmon	Mount Lemmon Survey	·	2.3 km	MPC · JPL
434939	2006 TF_{129}	—	October 4, 2006	Mount Lemmon	Mount Lemmon Survey	·	2.6 km	MPC · JPL
434940	2006 TA_{130}	—	October 4, 2006	Mount Lemmon	Mount Lemmon Survey	·	3.0 km	MPC · JPL
434941	2006 UU_{8}	—	October 16, 2006	Catalina	CSS	·	700 m	MPC · JPL
434942	2006 UM_{9}	—	October 16, 2006	Kitt Peak	Spacewatch	THM	2.6 km	MPC · JPL
434943	2006 UD_{11}	—	October 17, 2006	Mount Lemmon	Mount Lemmon Survey	·	2.7 km	MPC · JPL
434944	2006 UT_{11}	—	October 17, 2006	Mount Lemmon	Mount Lemmon Survey	·	700 m	MPC · JPL
434945	2006 UN_{15}	—	September 30, 2006	Mount Lemmon	Mount Lemmon Survey	·	3.9 km	MPC · JPL
434946	2006 UA_{20}	—	October 16, 2006	Kitt Peak	Spacewatch	·	3.2 km	MPC · JPL
434947	2006 UB_{21}	—	October 16, 2006	Kitt Peak	Spacewatch	·	560 m	MPC · JPL
434948	2006 UK_{24}	—	October 16, 2006	Kitt Peak	Spacewatch	·	700 m	MPC · JPL
434949	2006 UN_{25}	—	September 27, 2006	Mount Lemmon	Mount Lemmon Survey	·	740 m	MPC · JPL
434950	2006 UU_{27}	—	September 25, 2006	Mount Lemmon	Mount Lemmon Survey	·	680 m	MPC · JPL
434951	2006 UX_{31}	—	September 25, 2006	Mount Lemmon	Mount Lemmon Survey	·	2.9 km	MPC · JPL
434952	2006 UC_{38}	—	October 16, 2006	Kitt Peak	Spacewatch	EOS	2.5 km	MPC · JPL
434953	2006 UK_{39}	—	September 28, 2006	Mount Lemmon	Mount Lemmon Survey	·	2.4 km	MPC · JPL
434954	2006 UF_{46}	—	September 28, 2006	Mount Lemmon	Mount Lemmon Survey	URS	3.7 km	MPC · JPL
434955	2006 US_{47}	—	October 17, 2006	Kitt Peak	Spacewatch	·	4.1 km	MPC · JPL
434956	2006 UW_{49}	—	October 17, 2006	Kitt Peak	Spacewatch	EOS	1.8 km	MPC · JPL
434957	2006 UC_{52}	—	October 17, 2006	Mount Lemmon	Mount Lemmon Survey	·	3.1 km	MPC · JPL
434958	2006 UY_{57}	—	October 18, 2006	Kitt Peak	Spacewatch	·	580 m	MPC · JPL
434959	2006 UZ_{70}	—	October 16, 2006	Catalina	CSS	·	850 m	MPC · JPL
434960	2006 UU_{82}	—	October 17, 2006	Kitt Peak	Spacewatch	·	3.1 km	MPC · JPL
434961	2006 UO_{86}	—	October 17, 2006	Mount Lemmon	Mount Lemmon Survey	·	3.3 km	MPC · JPL
434962	2006 UO_{91}	—	October 18, 2006	Kitt Peak	Spacewatch	EOS	2.1 km	MPC · JPL
434963	2006 UP_{92}	—	October 18, 2006	Kitt Peak	Spacewatch	·	620 m	MPC · JPL
434964	2006 UP_{93}	—	October 18, 2006	Kitt Peak	Spacewatch	·	620 m	MPC · JPL
434965	2006 UN_{95}	—	September 30, 2006	Mount Lemmon	Mount Lemmon Survey	·	620 m	MPC · JPL
434966	2006 UJ_{100}	—	October 18, 2006	Kitt Peak	Spacewatch	·	620 m	MPC · JPL
434967	2006 UL_{101}	—	October 3, 2006	Mount Lemmon	Mount Lemmon Survey	·	590 m	MPC · JPL
434968	2006 UW_{104}	—	October 18, 2006	Kitt Peak	Spacewatch	·	590 m	MPC · JPL
434969	2006 UE_{109}	—	October 18, 2006	Kitt Peak	Spacewatch	·	680 m	MPC · JPL
434970	2006 UZ_{109}	—	September 27, 2006	Catalina	CSS	·	2.0 km	MPC · JPL
434971	2006 UQ_{116}	—	September 25, 2006	Kitt Peak	Spacewatch	·	3.8 km	MPC · JPL
434972	2006 UW_{118}	—	September 26, 2006	Mount Lemmon	Mount Lemmon Survey	·	1.7 km	MPC · JPL
434973	2006 UZ_{120}	—	October 19, 2006	Kitt Peak	Spacewatch	·	2.1 km	MPC · JPL
434974	2006 UH_{122}	—	October 19, 2006	Kitt Peak	Spacewatch	·	1.7 km	MPC · JPL
434975	2006 UO_{122}	—	October 19, 2006	Kitt Peak	Spacewatch	·	3.0 km	MPC · JPL
434976	2006 UP_{122}	—	September 30, 2006	Mount Lemmon	Mount Lemmon Survey	·	530 m	MPC · JPL
434977	2006 UT_{123}	—	October 19, 2006	Kitt Peak	Spacewatch	·	2.2 km	MPC · JPL
434978	2006 UA_{126}	—	October 2, 2006	Mount Lemmon	Mount Lemmon Survey	·	590 m	MPC · JPL
434979	2006 UN_{131}	—	October 19, 2006	Kitt Peak	Spacewatch	·	4.0 km	MPC · JPL
434980	2006 UD_{135}	—	October 19, 2006	Kitt Peak	Spacewatch	·	810 m	MPC · JPL
434981	2006 UZ_{135}	—	October 19, 2006	Kitt Peak	Spacewatch	·	3.6 km	MPC · JPL
434982	2006 UT_{136}	—	October 19, 2006	Mount Lemmon	Mount Lemmon Survey	·	2.9 km	MPC · JPL
434983	2006 UL_{139}	—	October 19, 2006	Mount Lemmon	Mount Lemmon Survey	·	840 m	MPC · JPL
434984	2006 UN_{140}	—	October 19, 2006	Kitt Peak	Spacewatch	·	3.2 km	MPC · JPL
434985	2006 UN_{143}	—	October 19, 2006	Mount Lemmon	Mount Lemmon Survey	·	3.5 km	MPC · JPL
434986	2006 UY_{143}	—	October 19, 2006	Kitt Peak	Spacewatch	·	800 m	MPC · JPL
434987	2006 UM_{145}	—	September 14, 2006	Catalina	CSS	EOS	2.2 km	MPC · JPL
434988	2006 UV_{155}	—	October 21, 2006	Mount Lemmon	Mount Lemmon Survey	·	4.1 km	MPC · JPL
434989	2006 UO_{185}	—	October 16, 2006	Catalina	CSS	·	4.8 km	MPC · JPL
434990	2006 UW_{198}	—	September 27, 2006	Mount Lemmon	Mount Lemmon Survey	·	730 m	MPC · JPL
434991	2006 UM_{208}	—	October 23, 2006	Kitt Peak	Spacewatch	ANF	1.5 km	MPC · JPL
434992	2006 UB_{209}	—	October 23, 2006	Kitt Peak	Spacewatch	·	2.5 km	MPC · JPL
434993	2006 UZ_{210}	—	October 23, 2006	Kitt Peak	Spacewatch	·	3.3 km	MPC · JPL
434994	2006 UD_{216}	—	September 26, 2006	Mount Lemmon	Mount Lemmon Survey	·	2.7 km	MPC · JPL
434995	2006 US_{225}	—	July 21, 2006	Mount Lemmon	Mount Lemmon Survey	·	660 m	MPC · JPL
434996	2006 UC_{242}	—	October 27, 2006	Kitt Peak	Spacewatch	·	3.8 km	MPC · JPL
434997	2006 UG_{247}	—	September 25, 2006	Kitt Peak	Spacewatch	EOS	1.8 km	MPC · JPL
434998	2006 UJ_{252}	—	October 27, 2006	Mount Lemmon	Mount Lemmon Survey	·	3.2 km	MPC · JPL
434999	2006 UD_{256}	—	October 27, 2006	Kitt Peak	Spacewatch	·	2.9 km	MPC · JPL
435000	2006 UP_{256}	—	September 19, 2006	Kitt Peak	Spacewatch	·	2.0 km	MPC · JPL

back to top

== Meaning of names ==
As minor planet discoveries are confirmed, they are given a permanent number by the IAU's Minor Planet Center (MPC), and the discoverers can then submit names for them, following the IAU's naming conventions. The list below concerns those minor planets in the specified number-range that have received names, and explains the meanings of those names.

Official naming citations of newly named small Solar System bodies are approved and published in a bulletin by IAU's Working Group for Small Bodies Nomenclature (WGSBN). Before May 2021, citations were published in MPC's Minor Planet Circulars for many decades. Recent citations can also be found on the JPL Small-Body Database (SBDB). Until his death in 2016, German astronomer Lutz D. Schmadel compiled these citations into the Dictionary of Minor Planet Names (DMP) and regularly updated the collection.

Based on Paul Herget's The Names of the Minor Planets, Schmadel also researched the unclear origin of numerous asteroids, most of which had been named prior to World War II. This article incorporates text from this source, which is in the public domain: SBDB New namings may only be added to this list below after official publication as the preannouncement of names is condemned. The WGSBN publishes a comprehensive guideline for the naming rules of non-cometary small Solar System bodies.

Named minor planet	Provisional	This minor planet was named for...	Ref · Catalog
434050 Törökfece	2001 TU_{257}	Ferenc “Fece” Török (b. 1963) ), a Slovak amateur astronomer	IAU · 434050
434180 Brosens	2002 UB_{77}	Jac Brosens (1941–2024), a Dutch amateur astronomer.	IAU · 434180
434325 Lautréamont	2004 JD_{2}	Isidore Lucien Ducasse, known as the Comte de Lautréamont, French poet born in Uruguay.	IAU · 434325
434453 Ayerdhal	2005 PE_{17}	Yal Ayerdhal (1959–2015), a French novelist specializing in politically engaged science fiction. He authored over 20 novels and won several prestigious literary prizes.	JPL · 434453
434678 Curlin	2006 BE_{8}	Jim and Maria Curlin. James (Jim) Stevens Curlin (b. 1963) is an American administrator managing the UN Environmental Program related to ozone action. He wrote a comprehensive biography of Ferdinand Quénisset. Jim’s wife Maria (b. 1967) was born in Greece. She manages the web pages of the Société astronomique de France related to observers activities.	IAU · 434678
434707 Oyfnpripetshik	2006 CH_{49}	Oyfn Pripetshik (“On the Hearth”) is a song written by the Yiddish-language folk poet Mark Warshawsky in the late 19th century.	IAU · 434707
