= Viola Sonata (Waterhouse) =

Sonata by Graham Waterhouse

Sonata ebraica
- Viola sonata by Graham Waterhouse
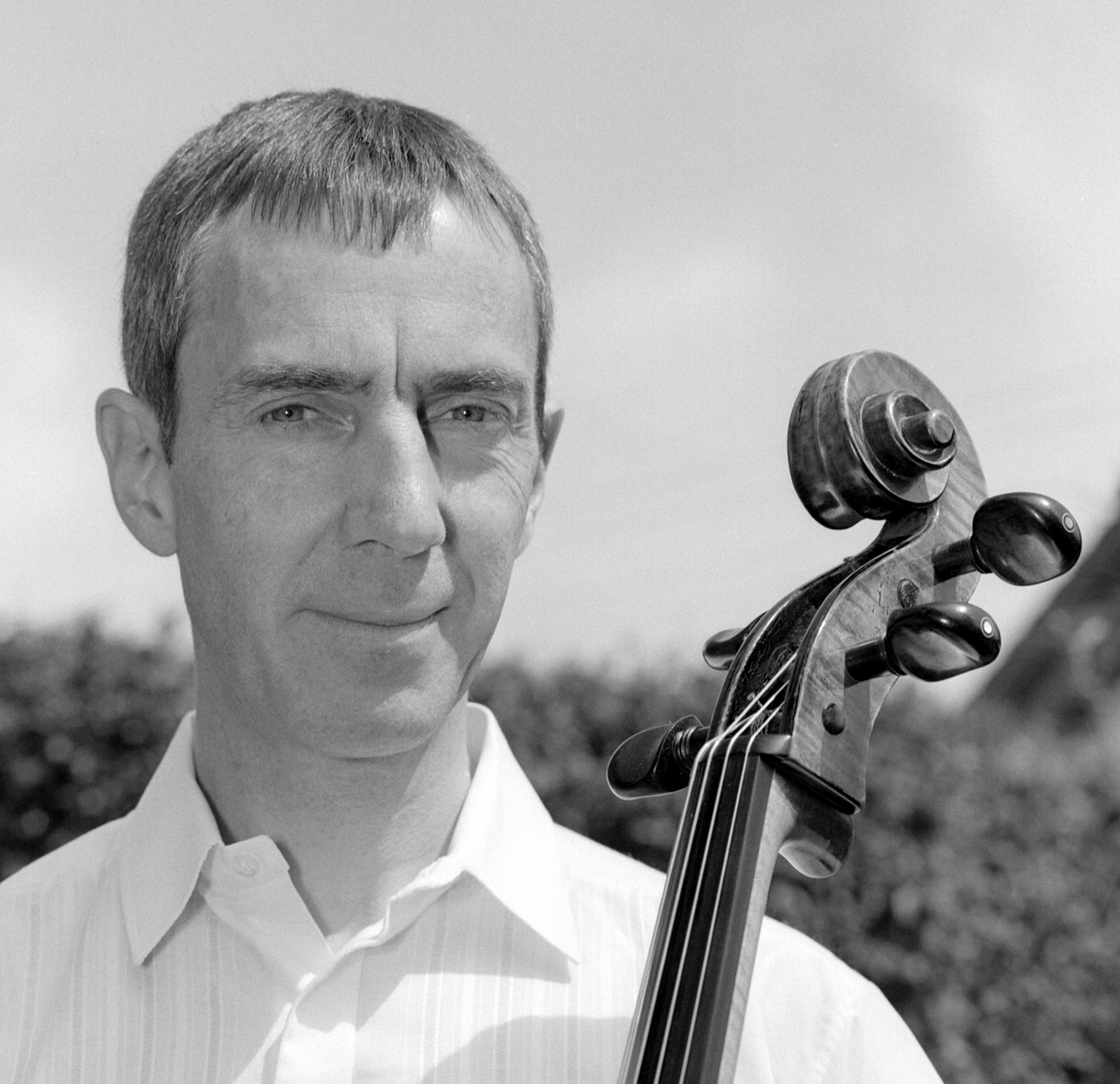
- The composer in 2011
- Period: contemporary
- Performed: 3 February 2013: Gasteig Munich
- Movements: 3

The Viola Sonata by Graham Waterhouse, entitled Sonata ebraica (Hebrew Sonata), was written in 2012 and 2013, and premiered in Munich in 2013. It was recorded in 2015 by Hana Gubenko and Timon Altwegg who commissioned and premiered it.

== History ==
Waterhouse composed the viola sonata in the winter 2012/13 on a commission of violist Hana Gubenko and her husband, pianist Timon Altwegg, who premiered it at the Gasteig in Munich on 3 February 2013, along with the piano quartets No. 1 and No. 2 by Mozart and Bei Nacht by Waterhouse. They played it several times, and recorded it in 2015, along with other music for viola and piano by Aaron Yalom (1918–2002), Ernst Levy and his son Frank Ezra Lévy (born 1930). A reviewer titled "Die Bratsche in jüdischer Klage" (The viola in Jewish lament) and noted the works' melancholy and intense warm sound, a broad range of tone colours, and virtuoso passages.

The sonata was played also by the violist Konstantin Sellheim and his sister Katharina Sellheim, members of the Münchner Philharmoniker. They performed it in 2014 at the Gasteig, along with Zeichenstaub and chamber music by Mozart and Beethoven, and at a composer portrait concert in Gilching in 2016, along with Epitaphium, among others. A review of the Süddeutsche Zeitung notes the work's "urgency and emotional tension" ("Eindringlichkeit und emotionale Spannung").

== Music ==
The work is in three movements:

1. Grave, pesante – Allegro
2. Adagio piangendo, serioso
3. Allegro vivo

The first movement opens with a slow solemn introduction, with bell-like sounds reminiscent of a Jewish religious gathering. The motif is repeated throughout the composition. In the second movement, the viola plays recitative-like passages to chords in the piano. Towards the end, the well-known Jewish song "Oyfn Pripetshik" is quoted in the piano. The third movement is based on a complex motif from an anthology of Jewish-American violin pieces of the early 20th century.
