= Oyfn Pripetshik =

Yiddish song by M.M. Warshawsky

"Oyfn Pripetshik" (Yiddish: אויפן פריפעטשיק, also spelled "Oyfn Pripetchik", "Oyfn Pripetchek", etc.; (Note: The word pripetshik is borrowed from East Slavic; e.g., Russian: pripechek, a place by the mouth of the Russian stove) English: "On the Hearth") is a Yiddish song by M.M. Warshawsky (1848–1907). The song is about a melamed teaching his young students the Hebrew alphabet. By the end of the 19th century it was one of the most popular songs of the Jews of Central and Eastern Europe, and as such it is a major musical memory of pre-Holocaust Europe.

The fourth stanza introduces tragic pathos into the song: "When, children, you will grow older / You will understand / How many tears lie in these letters / And how much crying." The lyrics hint at the traditional Yiddish saying that "The history of the Jews is written in tears".

== Lyrics ==
Original Yiddish

אויפן פריפעטשיק ברענט א פייערל
און אין שטוב איז הייס,
און דער רבי לערנט קליינע קינדערלעך
דעם אלף־בית.

רעפריין:
זעט זשע, קינדערלעך, געדענקט זשע טייערע,
וואס איר לערנט דא;
זאגט זשע נאך א מאל, און טאקע נאך א מאל:
קמץ־אלף: אָ!

לערנט, קינדער, מיט גרויס חשק,
אזוי זאג איך אייך אן;
ווער ס'וועט גיכער פון אייך קענען עברי,
דער באקומט א פאן.

לערנט, קינדער, האט נישט מורא,
יעדער אנהייב איז שווער;
גליקלעך איז דער ייד לערנט תורה,
וואס דארפן מיר נאך מער?

ווען איר וועט, קינדער, עלטער ווערן,
וועט איר אליין פארשטיין,
וויפל אין די אותיות ליגן טרערן
און וויפל געוויין...

אז איר וועט, קינדער, דעם גלות שלעפן,
אויסגעמוטשעט זיין,
זאלט איר פון די אותיות כוח שעפן,
קוקט אין זיי אריין.

Romanized Yiddish

Oyfn pripetchik brent a fayerl,
Un in shtub iz heys,
Un der rebe lernt kleyne kinderlekh,
Dem alefbeys.

Refrain:
Zet zhe kinderlekh, gedenkt zhe, tayere,
Vos ir lernt do;
Zogt zhe nokh a mol un take nokh a mol:
Komets-alef: o!

Lernt, kinder, mit groys kheyshek,
Azoy zog ikh aykh on;
Ver s'vet gikher fun aykh kenen ivre –
Der bakumt a fon.

Lernt, kinder, hot nit moyre,
Yeder onheyb iz shver;
Gliklekh der vos hot gelernt toyre,
Tsi darf der mentsh nokh mer?

Ir vet, kinder, elter vern,
Vet ir aleyn farshteyn,
Vifl in di oysyes lign trern,
Un vi fil geveyn.

Az ir vet, kinder, dem goles shlepn,
Oysgemutshet zayn,
Zolt ir fun di oysyes koyekh shepn,
Kukt in zey arayn!

English translation

On the hearth, a fire burns,
And in the house it is warm.
And the rabbi is teaching little children,
The alphabet.

Refrain:
See, children, remember, dear ones,
What you learn here;
Repeat and repeat yet again,
"Komets-alef: o!" (Note: "Komets-alef: o!" is a reading instruction: the letter aleph with the komets diacritic (אָ) is to be read as "o".)

Learn, children, with great enthusiasm.
So I instruct you;
He among you who learns Hebrew pronunciation faster –
He will receive a flag.

Learn children, don't be afraid,
Every beginning is hard;
Lucky is the one has learned Torah,
What more does a person need?

When you grow older, children,
You will understand by yourselves,
How many tears lie in these letters,
And how much lament.

When you, children, will bear the Exile,
And will be exhausted,
May you derive strength from these letters,
Look in at them!

== The Holocaust ==
At the Kovno Ghetto, poet Avrom Akselrod wrote the song with the melody of "Oyf'n Pripetshik" known under the titles "Baym geto toyerl" ("At the ghetto gate", the first line) and "Fun der arbet" ("Back from work"). The song is about smuggling (food, firewood, money) into the ghetto. Ghetto survival depended on this smuggling. It was published in Lider fun di Getos un Lagern by Shmerke Kaczerginski, 1948. The United States Holocaust Memorial Museum and Yad Vashem collections have a 1946 recording of the song by an unknown person at the Bavarian displaced persons camp.

The first 3 lines in Yiddish:

בײַם געטאָ טױרערל ברענט אַ פֿײַערל, די קאָנטראָל איז גרױס

The first stanza:

Baym geto toyerl
Brent a fayerl,
Un di shrek [variant: kontrol] iz groys.
Es geyen yidelekh
Fun di brigadelekh,
Fun yedn gist zikh shveys.

Near the ghetto gate
A fire burns
And the dread [variant: control] is fierce.
Jews are coming
From the work brigades,
From each face sweat is pouring.
(Note: In the original the words 'gate', 'fire', 'Jews', 'brigades' are in diminutive)

It is also available on the audio CD Ghetto Tango: Wartime Yiddish Theater, track 10, "Fun Der Arbet", sung by Adrienne Cooper, with piano and arrangement by Zalmen Mlotek.

== Recorded versions and soundtracks ==
- Among the earliest recorded versions of the song, by Nahum Koster (1918) – listen at Jewish Music Archive
- Esther Ofarim version on YouTube
- Version with all stanzas by Suzi Stern on Youtube
- Hebrew version sung by Yael Eilit (2010)
- Folk-metal version by Gevolt (2011)
- Einat Betzalel and L' Orchestre Festival version
- Cantors – A Faith In Song (Benzion Miller, Alberto Mizrahi & Naftali Herstik) (2003)
- The song is quoted in the Viola Sonata by Graham Waterhouse, entitled Sonata ebraica (Hebrew Sonata), written in 2012 and 2013, and recorded in 2015 by Hana Gubenko and Timon Altwegg who commissioned and premiered it.

The song has been featured on soundtracks including:

- Rhapsody in Blue (1945)
- Next Stop, Greenwich Village (1976)
- Billy Bathgate (1991)
- Schindler's List (1993)
- Brothers & Sisters, season 1, episode 10, "Light the Lights" (2006)
- Little House on the Prairie (1979) in season 5, episode 15, "The Craftsman", in multiple scenes with Isaac Singerman, a Jewish master woodworker who befriends Albert, and (1981) in season 7, episode 13, "Come Let us reason", in the scene where Percival's parents first come to Walnut Grove to meet Nellie and her parents. It is played in the background.
- Car 54, Where Are You? (1962) in season 2, episode 6, "Occupancy August 1st", Molly Picon, reprising her role as Mrs. Bronson, leads other cast members in singing the song.
