= Timon Altwegg =

Swiss classical pianist

- Born: 18 May 1967 (age 58); Münsterlingen, Switzerland
- Education: Royal College of Music
- Occupation: Classical pianist

Timon Altwegg (born 18 May 1967) is a Swiss classical pianist who is known for playing chamber music in Europe and the Americas. Contemporary composers wrote music for him. He made recordings with a focus on neglected Jewish composers, often with his wife, violist Hana Gubenko.

== Career ==
Born in Münsterlingen, Altwegg began his career studying with Hubert Mahler. He received a teaching diploma of the Schweizerischer Musikpädagogischer Verband (SMPV) in Zurich in 1989. He then studied for two years in London with Alan Rowlands at the Royal College of Music. He completed his studies in 1992 with a Piano Performing Diploma (Konzertdiplom) and the title "Associate of the Royal College of Music".

Altwegg has been invited to play concerts in Europe and the United States, often of chamber music. In May 2004, Altwegg played as the first foreign soloist with Iraqi National Symphony Orchestra in Bagdad, and teaching a master class at the music academy in Bagdad. The event was supported by the Embassy of Switzerland, The Swiss Foreign Office and the Ministry of Culture of Iraque. It was covered in the book Shrapnels. En marge de Bagdad by Élisabeth Horem in 2005. In 2005 and 2007, Altwegg toured in South America, playing in Columbia, Ecuador, El Salvador and Guatemala.

Contemporary composers have written music for Altwegg, such as Frank Lévy a piano sonata. Altwegg forms a viola duo with his wife, Hana Gubenko. They recorded in 2015 works for viola and piano in a collection entitled Sonata ebraica (Hebrew Sonata), after the Viola Sonata by Graham Waterhouse.

As musical advisor of the Swain-Alexander Trust in London, he administers the surviving manuscripts of the British composer Freda Swain, and has begun recordings of her piano works on Toccata Classics.

Altwegg is a piano instructor at the Musikschule Kreuzlingen.

=== Personal life ===
Altwegg is married to the Russian violist Hana Gubenko; they have two children, residing in Kreuzlingen from 1992.
