= Mark Warshawsky =

Poet and composer

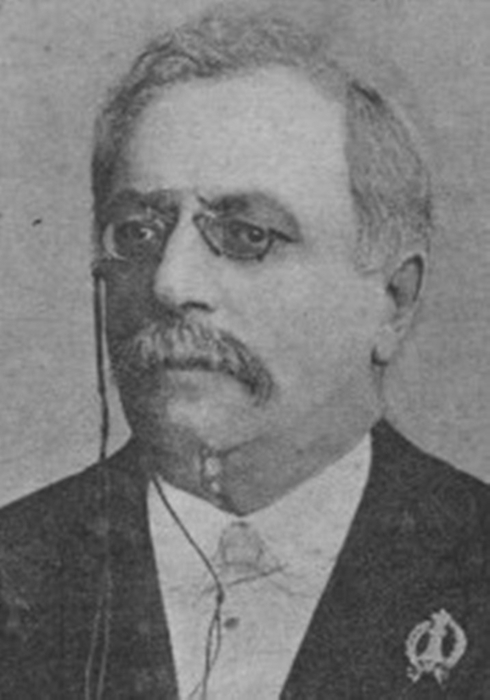
Mark Warshawsky

Mark Markovich Warshawsky (Varshavsky) (Russian: Марк Маркович Варшавский, Yiddish: מאַרק וואַרשאַווסקי; 26 November 1848 – 1907) was a Yiddish-language folk poet and composer.

== Biography ==
Mark Warshawsky was born in Odessa into an Ashkenazi Jewish family. He moved with his family as a child to Zhitomir, where he later attended the four-year state rabbinical high school. He then went on to study law at Odessa University for one year, and completed his studies at Kiev University and upon completion of his studies, began to practice law in Kiev. He practiced law throughout his life, barely managing to make a living. In 1903 he moved to Belgium to work as a legal adviser for a firm there; upon falling ill in 1905, he returned to Kiev, where he died two years later.

According to Prilutsky, Warshawsky spoke in the Yiddish dialect of the Volyn region.

Under the influence of Abraham Goldfaden, Warshawsky started to write songs and sing them in his circle of friends accompanied by a fortepiano. He did not take his musical work seriously and never recorded those songs, relying only on his memory. Many of his works spread throughout the Jewish community of the Ukrainian region of the Russian Empire simply through repeated performance and most were adopted as folk songs.

In 1890 Warshawsky met with Sholem Aleichem. After listening to his songs, Sholem Aleichem wrote "I simply hugged him and kissed him!" And then,

Villain! Why do not you print such songs? If I would not know that those are your own songs, I would swear that I heard them sometime performed by my mother!

Later, with Aleichem's full cooperation, Warshawsky published his first collection, Yiddishe Volkslider (Jewish People's songs, Kiev, 1900) with a hearty foreword from the great writer, Aleichem. The book was republished not only in Russia, but abroad as well. The collection included such songs as Der Alef-Beis (commonly known as Oyfn Pripetshik), A Brif fun Amerike, and Der Zeide mit der Babe. The songs described the everyday life of Jews in the Russian Empire.

Together Sholem Aleichem and Warshawsky started to tour Russia performing their own repertoires. They also planned to travel to the United States; however, those plans were unfulfilled when Warshawsky suddenly became ill and died on November 26, 1907.

The second edition of the Warshawsky's songs was published in Odessa in 1914, and then in New York (1948) and Buenos-Aires (1958).

== See also ==
- Oyfn Pripetshik

== Bibliography ==
- Lewinsky, Tamar; Shulman, Elias (2007). "Mark Warshawski". In Berenbaum, Michael; Skolnik, Fred (eds.). Encyclopaedia Judaica (2nd ed.). Detroit: Macmillan Reference. ISBN 978-0-02-866097-4 – via Jewish Virtual Library.
- Mlotek, Chana (February 18, 2011). "Varshavski, Mark." YIVO Encyclopedia of Jews in Eastern Europe. yivoencyclopedia.org.
- Prilutski, Noach, entry on Mark Warshawsky in Jewish Encyclopedia (online) (in Russian). Saint Petersburg: Obshchestvo Dlia Nauchnykh Evreiskikh Izdanii, Brockhaus-Efron, 1906-13.
