= List of compositions by Graham Waterhouse =

Compositions by Graham Waterhouse
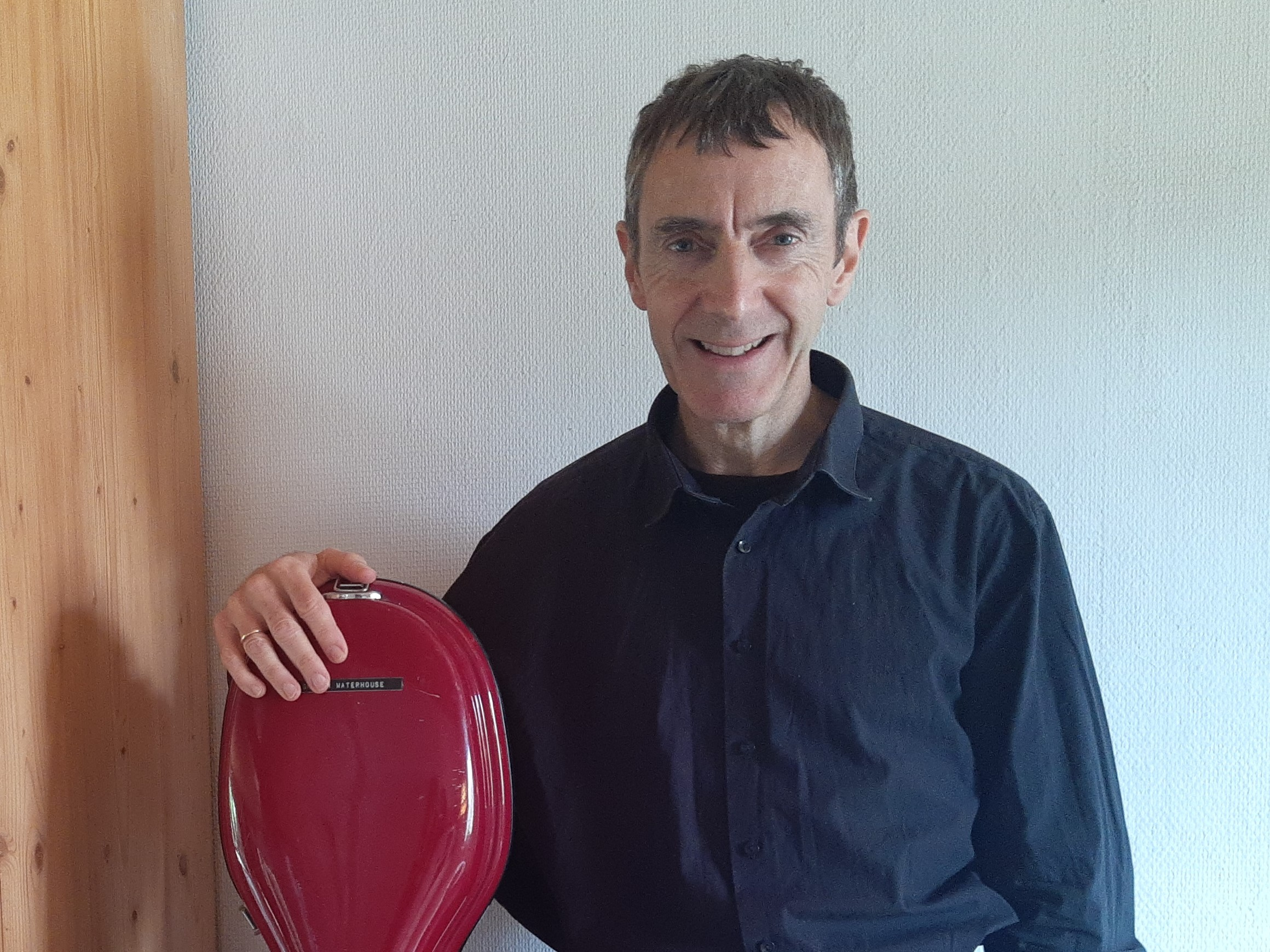
- Active 1979–2025
- vocal music; orchestral music; speaking voice and cello; chamber music; concertante music; piano music; organ music

Graham Waterhouse is a cellist and contemporary composer who was born in London and resides in Germany. His compositions focus on chamber music. They have been performed and recorded internationally. As a cellist, he has written for his own instruments and other string instruments, but being the son of bassoonist William Waterhouse, he has also been familiar with double reed instruments, and several works were commissioned by the International Double Reed Society (IDRS), usually first performed at their annual conventions. He has run a series of chamber music concerts at the Gasteig in Munich, where several works received their premiere. His first notable composition, the first movement of his String Sextet, Op. 1, was begun in 1979, and a duo for two violins, Fantasia Ucraina, in 2022.

== Table of compositions ==
His essential works, predominantly the published and recorded ones, are listed in the following table, initially by the year of composition. Other features listed are titles, Opus number, genre, publisher, year of publication, year of premiere, premiere location, recordings, and finally notes and a link to further information.

The years of composition follow those given on the composer's website. Works of the chamber music genre are further distinguished as solo, duo, trio, quartet, quintet, sextet, nonet and ensemble. The recordings list three portrait CDs, CD1 in 2001, CD2 in 2004, and CD3 in 2021. Additionally, some works have been recorded individually.

Waterhouse has had his works published by various publishing houses. Several of them are now represented by Schott Music (Schott), his principal publisher from 2019, including Accolade Musikverlag (Accolade), Robert Lienau Musikverlag (Lienau) and Zimmermann Musikverlag (Zimmermann). Works listed by Schott are marked by an S for further information. His first publisher was Friedrich Hofmeister Musikverlag, Leipzig (Hofmeister), marked by an H. Several works for speaking voice and cello were published by Heinrichshofen Verlag (Heinrichshofen), marked H. Breitkopf & Härtel (Breitkopf) have published pedagogic works, marked B.

Year	Title	Scoring	Op.	Genre	Publisher	Year	Premiere	Location	Rec	Notes and references
1979 to 2013	String Sextet	2 violins, 2 violas, 2 cellos	1	sextet	Schott	2022	2014	Gasteig		S
1979	Polish Suite	piano trio	3	trio	Hofmeister	1998			CD3	H
1979	Apple Picking	voice and piano	5	vocal	Hofmeister	1998				H
1981	Variations on a Theme of Pachelbel	organ	6	solo	Hofmeister	1998				H
1985	Jig, Air and Ree	string orchestra	9	ensemble	Hofmeister	2001			CD2	H
1984	Chrzaszcz	flute, oboe, cello	23	trio	Zimmermann	1996				S
1985	Toccatina precipitando	piano	24a	piano	Hofmeister	1997				H
1986	Hungarian Polyphony	string quartet	25	quartet	Hofmeister	1996	1988			H
1989	Piccolo Quintet	piccolo flute, string quartet	26	quintet	Zimmermann	2002			CD	S
1990	Cello Concerto	cello, orchestra	27	concertante	Hofmeister	2000	1995	Toluca, Mexico City		H
1991	Mouvements d'Harmonie	2 oboes, 2 clarinets, 2 bassoons, 2 horns, double bass (contrabassoon)	29	nonet	Accolade	2000	1991	Purcell Room, London	CD2	
1991	Nonet	flute, oboe, clarinet, horn, bassoon, violin, viola, cello and double bass	30	nonet	Lienau	2003				S
1992	Praeludium	piano	32	solo piano	Lienau	2002	1993	London	CD1	S
1992 rev. 1996	Three Pieces for Solo Cello	cello	28	cello	Hofmeister	1996	1992	Lichtenberg	CD1	H
1993	Four Epigraphs after Escher	viola, heckelphone, piano	35	trio	Hofmeister	1998	1995	Munich		H
1994	Jacobean Salute	flute, oboe, clarinet, horn, bassoon, 2 violins, viola, cello, double bass	34	ensemble	Lienau	2003	1995	Munich		S
1995	Celtic Voices and Hale Bopp	strings and treble	36	ensemble	Hofmeister	1998	1995	Preston	CD2	H
1995	Aztek Ceremonies	contrabassoon, piano	37	duo	Hofmeister	1996	1995	Rotterdam IDRS	CD	H
1995	Vezza	speaking voice, cello			Hofmeister	1997			CD1	H
1996	Le Charmeur de Serpents	recorder	39	solo	Hofmeister	1997			CD1	H
1997	Gestural Variations	oboe, bassoon, piano	43	trio	Hofmeister	1998				H
1997	Gestural Variations	clarinet, cello, piano	43a	trio	Hofmeister	1999			CD1	H 2000 prize
1998	bow’n blow	clarinet, cello	20	duo	Hofmeister	2000			CD1	H
1998	Diplo-Diversions	bassoon, piano	44	duo	Hofmeister	2008	1998	IDRS		H
1998	Hexenreigen	4 bassoons	45	quartet	Accolade	1998	1998	Tempe, Arizona		
1998	Contraventings	contrabassoon or clarinet	48	solo	Hofmeister	1999			CD1	H
1998	Hymnus	wind ensemble	49	ensemble	Hofmeister	2000			CD2	H
1998	Toccatina precipitando	clarinet, cello, piano	24/3	trio					CD1	H
1999	Bei Nacht	violin, cello, piano	50	trio	Hofmeister	2001	2000	University of Illinois	CD3	H
2001	Chieftain's Salute	Great Highland bagpipe, orchestra	34a	concertante	Lienau				CD2	S
2001	Les Tantrums d'Arlequin	cello, piano		duo	Zimmermann	2001				S
2001	Flohlied	speaking voice, cello			Heinrichshofen	2001				H
2002	Phantom Castle	2 recorders		duo	Zimmermann	2006				S
2001	Sinfonietta	string orchestra	41	ensemble					CD2	
2003	Threnody	cello		solo cello	Zimmermann	2002	2002	Munich		S
2003	Bassoon Quintet	bassoon, string quartet		quintet	Lienau	2015	2003	Gasteig		S
2003	Sicilian Air	flute, piano	56	duo	Zimmermann	2004				S
2004	Contradanza dei lupi	4 bassoons or contrabassoons		quartet	Accolade	2005	2004	Melbourne, IDRS		S
2005	Der Handschuh	speaking voice, cello			Heinrichshofen	2007	2005	St. Martin, Idstein		H
2006	Piano Album	piano		solo piano	Lienau	2006	2009			S
2007	Epitaphium	string trio		trio	Lienau	2013	2009	Gasteig	CD	S
2007	Das Hexen-Einmaleins	speaking voice, cello			Heinrichshofen	2009				H
2008	Bright Angel	3 bassoons, contrabassoon		quartet	Accolade	2009	2008	Provo, Utah, IDRS		
2008	Phoenix Arising	bassoon, piano		duo	Accolade	2009	2008	Wigmore Hall, London		S
2010	Chinese Whispers	string quartet		quartet	Lienau		2010	Gasteig		S 2011 prize
2010	Zeichenstaub	string trio		trio	Lienau	2013	2010	Arnstadt	CD	S
2010	Thomas Tunes	cello, piano		duo	Breitkopf	2017				B
2011	Rhapsodie Macabre	piano quintet		quintet			2011	Gasteig	CD3	
2012	Der Werwolf	speaking voice, cellos					2012	Essen		
2012	Fälle	8 speaking voices, 8 cellos			Heinrichshofen	2020	2012	Gasteig		H
2013	Trilogy	piano quintet		quintet			2013	Gasteig	CD3	
2013	Bells of Beyond	piano trio		trio			2013	Gasteig	CD3	
2013	Sonata ebraica	viola, piano		duo			2013	Gasteig	CD 2015	
2014	Skylla and Charybdis	piano quartet		quartet			2014	Gasteig	CD3	
2015	Incantations	piano, ensemble		concertante	Lienau	2015	2015	Birmingham		S
2019	Concentricities	clarinet, cello, piano		trio	Schott	2020	2019	Gasteig		S
2019	Variations	cello		solo cello	Schott	2020	2020	Vienna		S
2021	Eleven Smithereens	cello		solo	Schott	2026	2026	Gasteig HP8		S
2022	Fantasia Ucraina	2 violins		duo	Schott	2022	2022	Herzfelde		S
2022	Alchymic Quartet	string quartet		quartet			2022	Munich		

== Recording details ==
Compositions by Waterhouse have been recorded on three portrait CDs and several other collections.

The first portrait CD, Graham Waterhouse, of chamber music for recorder, clarinet, cello and piano, was released by Cybele Records in 2001, containing:

- Praeludium
- Three Pieces for Solo Cello
- Contraventings
- Le Charmeur de Serpents
- Scherzino
- bow'n blow
- Vezza
- Gestural Variations
- Toccatina Precipitando

A second CD, Graham Waterhouse Portrait 2, was released by Meridian Records in 2004, dedicated to music for string orchestra and works for wind ensemble. It contains:

- Chieftain's Salute
- Sinfonietta
- Mouvements d'Harmonie
- Celtic Voices
- Hymnus
- Hale Bopp
- Jig, Air and Reel

A third portrait CD, Graham Waterhouse Skylla und Charybdis, was released by Farao in 2021. The collection of chamber music for strings and piano includes:

- Rhapsodie Macabre
- Bei Nacht
- Trilogy
- Bells of Beyond
- Kolomyjka
- Skylla and Charybdis
