= Elisabeth Waterhouse =

English pianist and music pedagogue (born 1933)

- Born: Elisabeth Ritchie; 28 February 1933 (age 93)
- Education: Royal College of Music
- Occupations: Pianist; Music pedagogue; Summer school director
- Organization: National Chamber Music Course
- Spouse: William Waterhouse

Elisabeth Waterhouse (née Ritchie on 28 February 1933) is an English pianist and music pedagogue. She founded the National Chamber Music Course, a summer school for young string players, in 1974, and has managed it since. She is the widow of the bassoonist and musicologist William Waterhouse.

== Early life and education ==
Ritchie studied piano at the Royal College of Music with Frank Merrick. She also studied with Friedrich Wührer and Hugo Steurer in Munich. She met her future husband, William Waterhouse, at the Royal College of Music, and again later at a competition in Munich. They married two years later.

== Career ==
In the 1960s, Waterhouse was an early supporter of what became the London Suzuki Group, transferring the Suzuki method of violin teaching from the U.S. to England. She taught Alexander Technique at the Guildhall School of Music and Drama.

In 1974, Waterhouse and her husband founded two summer camps for music which she directed, the National Chamber Music Course, a summer school for young string players, held for a week in August with international instructors, and for smaller children who come with their parents the Temple Dinsley Summer School, based on the Suzuki method. In 1985, both schools moved to Princess Helena College. When it was closed in 2021, they moved to the Oratory School near Reading in Chilterns. She has managed the schools from the beginning.

Elisabeth and William Waterhouse performed together extensively on tour. In 1992, she was the pianist in the world premiere of the Chamber Concerto V by Elliott Schwartz in Amsterdam, with her husband as the bassoonist and the Utrecht String Quartet. In 1996, they went on a five-and-a-half week tour of Canada and the United States.

She taught violin and Alexander Technique at the 1997 Pan-Pacific Suzuki Conference in Australia.

== Advocacy ==
After her husband died unexpectedly in 2007, Elisabeth Waterhouse encouraged James B. Kopp to proceed with writing a book which William had asked him to co-author for Yale University Press. The book, titled The Bassoon, made extensive use of source material which William had gathered in the Waterhouse Music Barn, and is dedicated "To Elisabeth Waterhouse, a pianist who has long championed the bassoon."

=== The Proud Bassoon ===
Waterhouse initiated a memorial concert for her husband close to what would have been his 80th birthday, held on 16 April 2011 at Wigmore Hall and titled The Proud Bassoon. Among the players were their children, Gervase de Peyer and Timothy Brown as former members of the Melos Ensemble, players who succeeded him such as Roger Birnstingl (Orchestre de la Suisse Romande) and Julie Price (BBC Symphony Orchestra), bassoonists from around the world, such as Jim Kopp, Lyndon Watts and Takashi Yamakami, his students and a bassoon quartet from the RNCM, led by Stefano Canuti. All the music played related to him.

She is an honoured member of the British Double Reed Society (BDRS). In 2011, she donated the papers of her husband, including his correspondence and a collection of program books, to the collections of the Royal Northern College of Music, where they were titled The Proud Bassoon.

== Personal life ==
Elisabeth and William Waterhouse had three children. Their daughter Celia Milner became a violinist with the BBC Symphony Orchestra, their daughter Lucy Waterhouse became a freelance violinist and teacher, and their son Graham Waterhouse is a cellist and composer, who dedicated his String Sextet op. 1 to her in 2022, saying that her lifelong dedication to chamber music, especially her pioneering work at the Summer Schools from the mid-1970s, was a major inspiration for the work. She is an outdoor swimmer.
