= Epitaphium (Waterhouse) =

Composition for string trio by Graham Waterhouse

- String trio by Graham Waterhouse
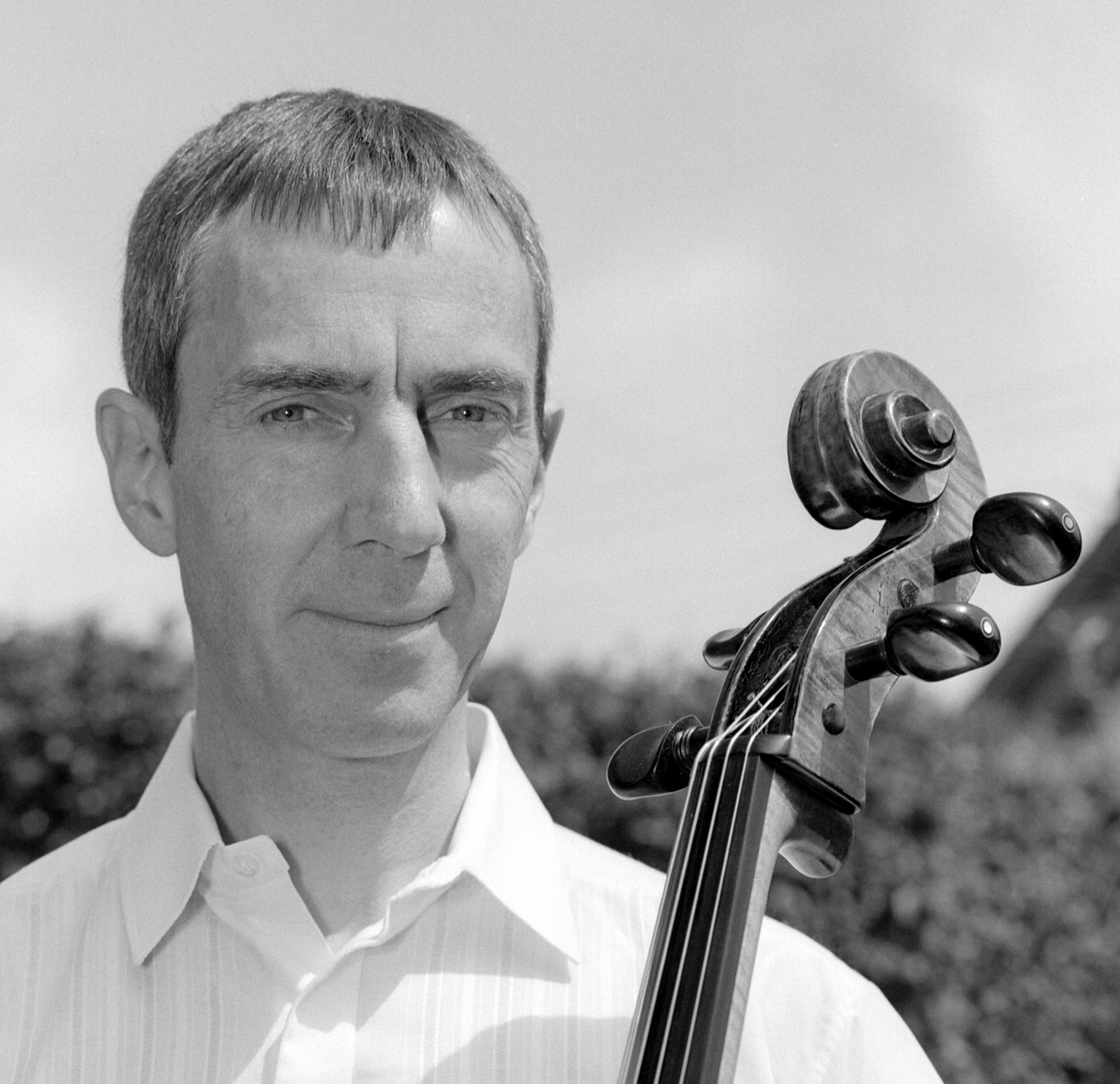
- The composer in 2011
- Full title: Epitaphium in Memoriam W.R.W.
- Year: 2007
- Period: contemporary
- Dedication: William Waterhouse
- Performed: 19 July 2009: Gasteig Munich
- Movements: 1
- Scoring: violin, viola, cello

Epitaphium is a composition for string trio by Graham Waterhouse. In 2007, after the death of his father William Waterhouse, he composed Epitaphium in Memoriam W.R.W. as a tribute to his memory.

== History ==
William Waterhouse died suddenly in Florence on 5 November 2007, age 76. His son composed Epitaphium as an Epitaph to be performed at a memorial service in London, "In Memoriam W.R.W.". Instead, the trio was premiered on 19 July 2009 in the Kleiner Konzertsaal of the Gasteig, performed by the players of the Münchner Philharmoniker Clément Courtin (violin) and Gunter Pretzel (viola), and the composer (cello). The program included Wilhelm Killmayer's Trio (1984), Arnold Schoenberg's string trio and Mozart's Divertimento K. 563.

Epitaphium was performed several times, including a concert on 14 March 2011 in Munich presenting mostly contemporary Bavarian composers, along with the composer's Bassoon Quintet and music of Franz Lachner, Jörg Duda, Bernd Redmann and Dieter Acker, with violist Konstantin Sellheim.

Epitaphium was the penultimate work in the concert The Proud Bassoon, celebrating William Waterhouse on 16 April 2011 in Wigmore Hall. It was the first performance of the work in the UK. The players were the children of William Waterhouse, as had been planned originally for the Memorial Service: Celia Waterhouse, violinist with the BBC Symphony Orchestra, Lucy Waterhouse, viola, and the composer, cello. On the program was also the composer's quartet for three bassoons and contrabassoon Bright Angel.

== Music ==
The 76-bar work is marked Adagio ma con moto. The opening theme is reminiscent of plainsong. The harmony relies on the pure intervals – perfect fourths, perfect fifths and octaves, often together with open strings and natural harmonics. Cadenza-like episodes and pizzicato add colour. A motif quotes the "Requiescant in pace" from Britten's War Requiem, referring both to the words "may they rest in peace" as to the premiere of the work, which William Waterhouse had played as the bassoonist of the Melos Ensemble, conducted by the composer. An augmented version of the opening theme in the violin, accompanied by fifths on natural harmonics and bell-like pizzicato, ends the music.

Peter Grahame Woolf summarised after the UK premiere: "Epitaphium for W.R.W. packs a memorable punch and intensity into 76 bars".
