= Julie Price (bassoonist) =

English bassoonist

- Born: 4 December 1963 (age 62); Bakewell
- Education: Royal Northern College of Music; Manchester University
- Occupations: Bassoonist; Academic teacher.
- Organizations: BBC Scottish Symphony Orchestra; Royal Opera House, Covent Garden; BBC Symphony Orchestra; English Chamber Orchestra; Razumovsky Ensemble; Royal College of Music
- Awards: BBC Young Musician of the Year

Julie Price is an English bassoonist. She is principal bassoonist of the BBC Symphony Orchestra.

== Early life ==
Price studied the bassoon at the Royal Northern College of Music and Manchester University with Edward Warren and William Waterhouse. She continued her studies with Roger Birnstingl in Geneva.

In 1980 she was in the woodwind final BBC Young Musician of the Year.

== Career ==
Price was principal bassoonist with the BBC Scottish Symphony Orchestra, then first bassoonist at the Royal Opera House, Covent Garden. She is principal bassoonist of the English Chamber Orchestra (ECO) and principal bassoonist with the BBC Symphony Orchestra.

As a chamber musician, Price is a member of the Razumovsky Ensemble and has played with the Lindsay String Quartet, the Nash Ensemble, the Haffner Wind Ensemble, and Endymion. She played William Hurlstone's Trio in G Minor for Clarinet, Bassoon and Piano on 22 November 2006 for the composer's centenary celebration concert and exhibition at the Royal College of Music.

She was interviewed by Time Out in 2008.

She performed at the 2009 conference of the International Double Reed Society in Birmingham, in the opening recital of the British Double Reed Society among others Gestural Variations of Graham Waterhouse. She was one of 16 bassoonists in the concert The Proud Bassoon, celebrating William Waterhouse on 16 April 2011 in Wigmore Hall. She played in Waterhouse’s arrangement for two bassoon choirs of Giovanni Gabrieli's Sonata Pian' e Forte and movements from Gordon Jacob’s Suite, dedicated to Waterhouse. Price recorded with the ECO, conducted by Ralf Gothóni, Mozart's bassoon concerto and his Sinfonia concertante for flute, oboe, horn, and bassoon, K. 297b, and Edward Elgar's Romance for bassoon and orchestra, Op. 62.

Price was a visiting professor of bassoon at the Royal College of Music and is currently a visiting professor of bassoon at the Royal Academy of Music.
