= Gestural Variations =

Trio composition by Graham Waterhouse

- Piano trio by Graham Waterhouse
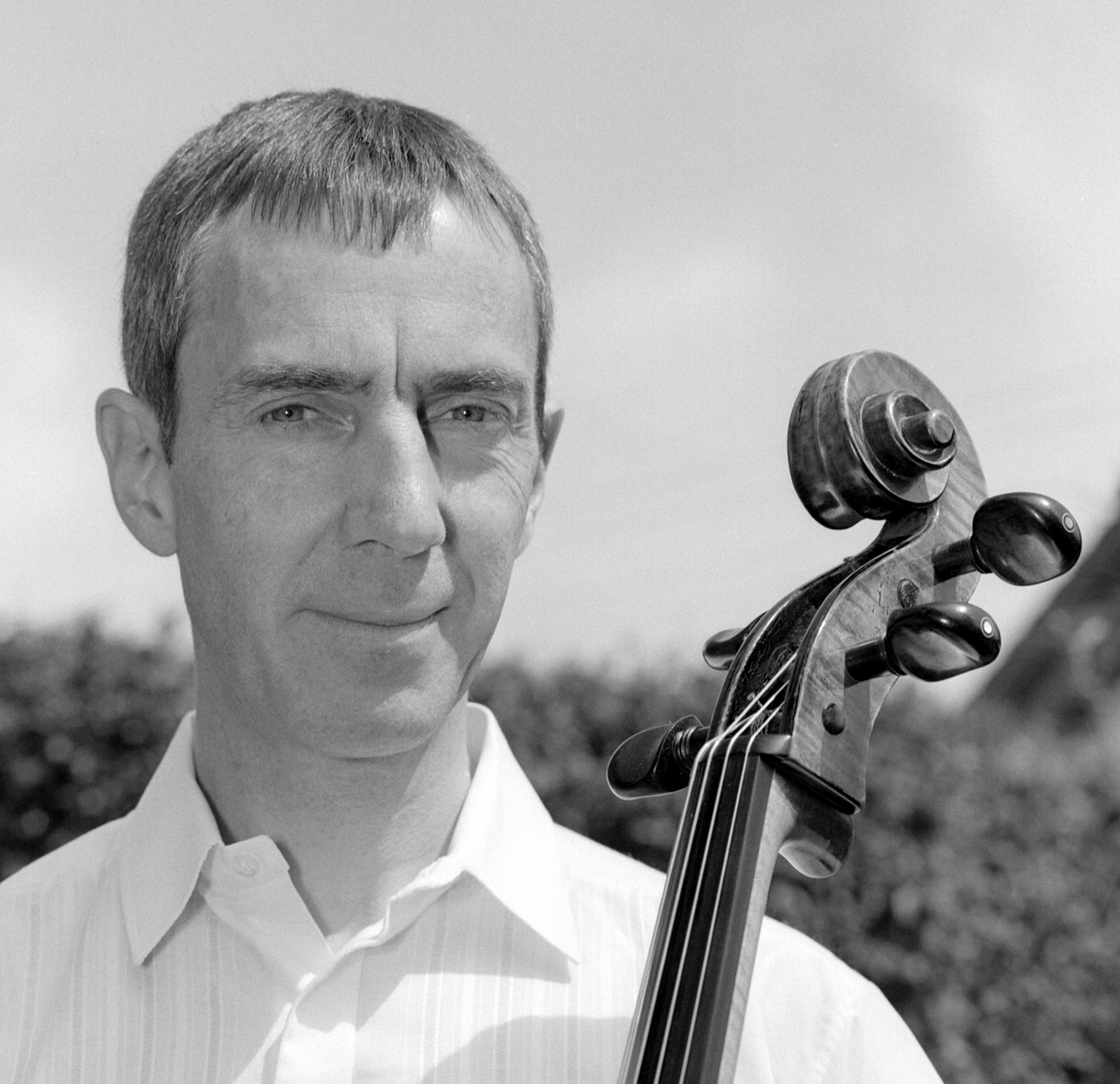
- Composer Graham Waterhouse, 2011
- Opus: 43
- Year: 1997
- Period: contemporary
- Form: variations
- Published: 1998: Leipzig Hofmeister
- Movements: nine
- Scoring: oboe, bassoon, piano; clarinet, cello, piano op. 43a (1999); oboe, cello, piano op. 43b (2000); flute, cello, piano op. 43c (2009)

Gestural Variations, Op. 43, is a trio composition by Graham Waterhouse in 1997 originally for oboe, bassoon and piano. Later versions are scored for clarinet, cello and piano (1999) and flute, cello and piano (2009).

== Movements ==
The composition of about 14 minutes presents a theme with six character variations, framed by an introduction and a postlude. Each variation expresses a movement or gesture similar to a mime artist or a dancer.

- Introduction
- Theme
- Var. 1 (abrupt, jerky)
- Var. 2 (slow, graceful)
- Var. 3 (fleeting, breathless)
- Var. 4 (pensive, hesitating)
- Var. 5 (threatening, menacing)
- Var. 6 (exuberant, ebullient)
- Postlude

== History ==
Gestural Variations, op. 43, was commissioned by bassoonist Henry Skolnick and written for the annual conference 1997 of the International Double Reed Society (IDRS). It was first performed in 1997 by John Dee, Henry Skolnick and José Lopez at the Northwestern University, Evanston, Illinois. G. Salter remarked in the "Double Reed News": "The composer's purposeful use of ambiguous, shifting harmonies and overlapping unisons sets these contrasts in miniature apart from much that is being written today, conveying the uncertainties of our times." This first version follows the scoring of Poulenc's Trio for oboe, bassoon and piano.

A second version, op. 43a, was written in 1999 for clarinet, cello and piano, a trio combination for which Beethoven composed his Trio op. 11 (Gassenhauer-Trio), Johannes Brahms his Klarinettentrio op. 114 and Alexander Zemlinsky his Trio op. 3, among others. This setting of Gestural Variations appears on a recording Portrait, a selection of the composer's chamber music on Cybele Records, played by Markus Schön as the clarinettist, Waterhouse as the cellist, and Michael Wendeberg as the pianist. A review of Hubert Culot stated: The "highly contrasted variations display a remarkable instrumental mastery, that makes this work a feast from first to last." The versions were published by Hofmeister, Leipzig, in 1998 and 1999 respectively.

Gestural Variations in a third version, op. 43b, for oboe, cello and piano was awarded a prize at the competition of Via Nova in Weimar and premiered there on 31 March 2000.

The UK premiere of the clarinet version was played on 5 November 2002 in a Composer Portrait Concert with Graham Waterhouse in the St. Cyprian's Church in London.

The original version opened the Welcome Recital 6 of the British Double Reed Society at the IDRS conference 2009 in Birmingham, played by Richard Simpson, Julie Price and Janet Simpson.

A fourth version, op. 43c, for flute, cello and piano was premiered at the Gasteig Munich on 20 December 2009, played by Jens Josef, Waterhouse, and Rudi Spring. This version was played there again on 11 April 2010, this time with Christopher White as the pianist.
