= Scylla and Charybdis (disambiguation) =

Scylla and Charybdis is a metaphor relating to two monsters of Greek mythology:

- Scylla and
- Charybdis

Scylla and Charybdis may also refer to:

- Skylla and Charybdis (Waterhouse), 2014 composition for piano quartet by Graham Waterhouse
  - Skylla und Charybdis (album) of chamber music by Graham Waterhouse
- "Scylla and Charybdis" (Ulysses episode) an episode in James Joyce's novel Ulysses
- "Torn Between Scylla and Charybdis" track on Trivium's album Shogun
- Charybde et Scylla, episode of Ulysses 31
- Through Scylla and Charybdis; or, The Old Theology and the New, a book by George Tyrrell

== See also ==
- Scylla (disambiguation)
- Charybdis (disambiguation)
