= Ron Klimko =

American bassoonist, composer

Ronald James Klimko
- Born: December 13, 1936; Lena, Wisconsin, U.S.
- Died: March 18, 2012 (aged 75); McCall, Idaho, U.S.
- Education: Milton College; University of Wisconsin–Madison
- Occupations: bassoonist, author, composer, teacher, performer

Ronald James Klimko (December 13, 1936 – March 18, 2012) was an American bassoonist, author, composer, teacher, and performer.

He was editor of The Double Reed, the publication of the International Double Reed Society, for thirty years (1982–2012) and a professor of music at Lionel Hampton School of Music, University of Idaho, for thirty-two years (1968–2000).

Klimko played bassoon in the Spokane Symphony for 20 years, from 1969 to 1990. He also played bassoon with the Yakima Symphony, Walla Walla Symphony, Mid-Columbia Symphony, and LaGrande Symphony. He gave master classes in bassoon at Lawrence University, Ithaca College, and several other schools. He was conductor of the Spokane Youth Orchestra for one year.

While at the University of Idaho, he received three sabbatical leave grants. On the first leave, he was in London, England, from January to August 1976, to study with world-renowned bassoonists, William Waterhouse and Cecil James. On the second leave, he was in Paris, France, from September 1983 to August 1984, to study French bassoon privately with Maurice Allard of the Paris Opera and Paris Conservatory. On his third leave, he was Visiting Professor of Bassoon at the University of Colorado, Boulder, from 1990 to 1991. Until his death, he was a member of the North American Wind Quintet, where he played the French bassoon.

Klimko was the author of the book Bassoon Performance, Practices, and Teaching in the United States and Canada (1971, rev. 1992), the first such study of its kind for double reed players. He was also the editor of The Double Reed, the professional publication of the International Double Reed Society, from 1982 until his death in 2012. He regularly wrote a column and reviews of recordings for that publication. In 2011, he was honored by the IDRS with a lifetime Honorary Membership. He traveled around the world to visit with and interview bassoonists for publication in the Double Reed.

His original compositions are archived at the University of Idaho. In his early years of composing, Klimko was interested in choral music and opera. He composed an opera to the Huxley work Brave New World, but it could not be published or performed due to copyright restrictions. He also wrote works for woodwind instruments. One of his compositions, Passages, for clarinet and bassoon, was performed at the concert for the celebration of his life held in Moscow, Idaho in June 2012.

In retirement, he and his family lived in McCall, Idaho, from 2003 to 2012, where he was President and Director of the McCall Chamber Orchestra. Every year for the last several years he organized a summer concert of the McCall Bassoon Band, now called the Ron Klimko Bassoon Band. Klimko arranged many popular and classical works for bassoon quintet and bassoon band. Following a decline in health in 2011, he and his second wife, Kathryn George, relocated to Issaquah, Washington in order to be nearer to children and better medical care. In 2011 and 2012, he played in the Sammamish Symphony and the Microsoft Orchestra. Klimko's last performance was Dvořák's New World Symphony with the Microsoft Orchestra.

Klimko died on March 18, 2012, at the Brundage Mountain ski resort in McCall, Idaho.

The Ronald J. Klimko Memorial Endowed Scholarship was established by his colleagues and friends and gives scholarships to music students at the University of Idaho.
