= Four Epigraphs after Escher =

Chamber music composition by Graham Waterhouse

Vier Epigraphe nach Escher
- Piano trio by Graham Waterhouse
- Opus: 35
- Period: contemporary
- Based on: artworks by M. C. Escher
- Composed: 1995
- Published: 1998: Leipzig Hofmeister
- Movements: 4
- Scoring: viola; heckelphone; piano

Vier Epigraphe nach Escher (original German title; English: Four Epigraphs after Escher), Op. 35, is a chamber music composition by Graham Waterhouse, written in 1995 for viola, heckelphone and piano. Its four movements refer to graphic artworks by M. C. Escher. It was commissioned by Dr. Gunter Joppig and premiered in Munich in 1995. The piece was published by Hofmeister in 1998 and first performed in the U.S. in the same year.

== History ==
Waterhouse was inspired by graphic artworks by M. C. Escher to write in 1993 Vier Epigraphe nach Escher (Four Epigraphs after Escher) in four movements, each named for a piece of graphic art. He scored it as a piano trio with viola and heckelphone. It is one of few chamber music works for heckelphone, a rare member of the oboe family prominently used by Richard Strauss, Frederick Delius and Paul Hindemith. Paul Hindemith had written a Trio, Op. 47, for the same combination of instruments in 1928. The work was published by Friedrich Hofmeister Musikverlag in Leipzig in 1998.

The composition is structured in four movements:

1. Die Gottesanbeterin (Praying mantis)
2. Möbiusband II (Möbius strip)
3. Reiter (Rider)
4. Reptilien (Reptiles)

The first movement was inspired by a graphic showing an oversized mantis in a church, on a stone monument to a bishop on his tomb. Escher dealt with the phenomenon of the Möbius strip several times; the music relates to Möbius II, with ants crawling over the strip. The third movement alludes to a print with riders in two directions and two colour shades, partly complementing each other. The final movement is based on Escher's 1934 print Reptiles.

== Performances ==
Vier Epigraphe nach Escher was premiered in Munich in 1995 by Gunther Joppig (heckelphone), Barbara Sterff (viola) and Graham Waterhouse (piano). The U.S. premiere took place at the 1998 conference of the International Double Reed Society in Tempe, Arizona. In a concert on 6 June of music by Waterhouse, which contained also two world premieres, one more U.S. premiere and a reprise of Mouvements d'Harmonie, the piece was played by Gerald Corey, heckelphone, violist Peter Rosato and the composer as the pianist.
