= Jörg Duda =

German composer (born 1968)

- Born: 17 December 1968 (age 57); Munich, West Germany
- Education: Musikhochschule München; Musikhochschule Hannover; Mozarteum
- Occupation: Composer

Jörg Duda (born 17 December 1968) is a German composer of classical music.

== Life and career ==
Born in Munich, Duda was influenced by the church music of Scheyern Abbey. He took lessons in organ and improvisation with Harald Feller, in theory and composition with Dieter Acker. From 1988 to 1992 he studied church music at the Musikhochschule München. He studied choral conducting with Roderich Kreile and was a member in his choir Junge Kantorei München. He played organ concerts and worked as a Korrepetitor for the choir of the Bayerischer Rundfunk and the Philharmonischer Chor München. From 1992 Duda studied composition with Peter Kiesewetter at the Musikhochschule Hannover and continued with Dieter Acker in Munich, completing the "Meisterklasse" in 1997.

From 1998 to 2022 Duda was Kantor of St Emmeram in Geisenfeld. He taught at times music theory at the University of Erlangen–Nuremberg. Duda co-founded the Münchner Harmoniemusik and the piano quintet Cumulus. In 2007 he was awarded the Kulturförderpreis (culture award) of Geisenfeld.

Duda composed especially in the fields of organ music, sacred choral music, chamber music for wind instruments and solo concertos. He has been inspired by Finnish authors and singers, such as Pirjo Honkanen, Lassi Nummi and Johann Tilli. His works are often commissioned by performers. He has collaborated with the chamber choir novAntica, alumni of the Musikhochschule München, who premiered in 1995 his Pater Noster for two mixed choirs. His motet Friede über Israel was commissioned and recorded in 2000 by Roderich Kreile and the Dresdner Kreuzchor. Duda composed four Finnish Quartets, each for a woodwind instrument and a string trio. The first was commissioned by bassoonist Lyndon Watts, premiered by him in 2001 and played again in Munich on 14 March 2011, together with the premiere of Bernd Redmann's Migrant and with the Basson Quintet of Graham Waterhouse. Duda's tuba concerto was composed for Andreas Hofmeir and premiered by him in Ingolstadt on 23 October 2010.

As a performer, he has promoted the works of local Geisenfeld composers such as Johann Feldmayr (1573–1635) and Johann Kyrzinger (1580?–1624).

== Selected works ==
=== Orchestra ===
- Lacrimae lucis Op. 22 for violin and large orchestra (for Sonja Korkeala)
- Poéme fantasque Op. 30/1 for large orchestra (commission: Schulze Delitzsch Foundation)
- EXALTATION I Op. 31/1 for organ, 10 brass players and timpani (commission: Ingolstädter Orgeltage)
- EXALTATION II Op. 31 for flute and string orchestra
- Sinfonia concertante I Op. 50 for 12 wind instruments, double bass, celesta, timpani and organ
- Sinfonia concertante II Op. 54 for piano and orchestra
- Bassoon concerto Op. 66
- Tuba concerto Op. 67/1 (commission: Andreas Hofmeir, Ingolstädter Kammerorchester)

=== Choral music ===
- Three motets Op. 3 for choir a cappella
- Nachtlieder Op. 10 for choir a cappella (Mörike, Storm, Fischer, Goethe)
- Nine Finnish madrigals Op. 14 for choir and soloists a cappella (Lassi Nummi, Viljo Kajava)
- Magnificat Op. 17 for double choir a cappella (commission: Madrigalchor der Musikhochschule München)
- Noë! Op. 21, Christmas oratorio for soloists, double choir, large orchestra and two organs (commission: Roderich Kreile, choir of the Christuskirche München)
- Laudes naturae Op. 24, motet for soprano and double choir a cappella
- Seven motets Op. 25 for choir a cappella, including

- Friede über Israel (commission: Roderich Kreile, Dresdner Kreuzchor)
- Lobet den Herr. Halleluja! (commission: Julian Chr. Tölle, Amadeuschor)

- Harmony in music Op. 34 for men's vocal ensemble and piano (Wordsworth, Shakespeare, Poe) (commission: Die Singphoniker)
- Im Herbst Op. 37a cantata for three female voices and piano (Mörike, Storm, Hölderlin, Rilke)
- Missa "laetentur coeli" Op. 46 for soloists, choir, large orchestra and organ
- Requiem Op. 60 for soloists, choir, large orchestra and organ

=== Lied ===
- Sechs Lieder Op. 2 (Hermann Hesse) for mezzo-soprano and guitar (for Monika Fröhlich)
- Four Songs Op. 19 (John Keats) for bass-baritone, viola and piano
- EXALTATION III Op. 31/3 (Psalm 88) for bass-baritone, horn, bass clarinet, cello and organ (Artionale München)
- Magnificat II Marian kiitosvirsi Op. 43/2 for soprano and organ (for Pirjo Honkanen)
- Puun rukous (prayer of the tree) Op. 43/4a (Lassi Nummi) for bass and organ (for Johann Tilli)
- Fünf Psalmengesänge Op. 47 for bass and organ (commission: Johann Tilli)
- Sonnenaufgang Op. 49a for soprano, alto flute and piano (commission: Trio Cantrajano)
- Wanderer im Spätherbst Op. 49c (Hesse) for mezzo-soprano, flute and mandoline (for Barbara Hesse-Bachmaier)
- Verrinnend Op. 55a (Theodor Storm) for alto, bassoon and piano (for Ruth Schorgg)
- Natura Finlandiae Op. 55c (Lassi Nummi) for bass and piano (for Johann Tilli)

=== Keyboard ===
- Two piano sonatas
- Fantasiestücke Op. 36 for organ in three volumes
- Fiori musicali Op. 61

=== Chamber music ===
- Sonatine Op. 1 for flute and guitar
- KAIHO (longing) Op. 23/3 for flute (for Gergely Bodoky)
- Elegie und Rhapsodie Op. 23/4 for alto saxophon and organ
- Sonate Finnischer Sommer Op. 35 for flute and piano (for Brunhild Fischer)
- Bassoon sonate Op. 52 (for Brigitte Starck)
- Sonatinas Op. 62
- Fantasia II Op. 29 for tuba and harp (for Andreas Hofmeir)
- Duo Op. 44/2 for violin and cello
- Dreamdance No. 1 Op. 55b/1
- Four quartets Op. 41 Finnish Quartets for a wind instrument and string trio:

- No. 1 bassoon (commission: Lyndon Watts)
- No. 2 oboe d'amore (A)
- No. 3 clarinet (E flat)
- No. 4 flute (G)

- Tre Quartetti animati Op. 57/1-3 for oboe, clarinet, horn and bassoon
- Quartetto profondo Op. 57/4 for 2 horns and 2 bassoons
- Quartetto semiserio Op. 57/5 for 4 bassoons (contrabassoon ad lib.)
- Notturno Op. 44/1 (commission: Albana Quartett)
- Five string quartets
- Five wind quintets for flute, oboe, clarinet, horn and bassoon
- Two brass quintets
- Quartet Op. 48/1 for oboe, clarinet, bassoon and piano
- Two quintets for oboe, clarinet, horn, bassoon and piano
- Divertimento Op. 33/4
- Cassazion Op. 42/3
- Suite en Sax Op. 33/3 for saxophone octet and tuba (for Hans Blume)
- EXALTATION IV: Oiseaux grotesque „Komische Vögel“ (after Joseph Fromm) Op. 40

=== Early works in "old style" ===
- Three trios for clarinet, violin and cello
- Trios for flute, clarinet and bassoon
- Quartet in B for oboe, violin, viola and violoncello
- Two wind quintets
- Wind Octet
- Missa in B (No. 2) for soloists, choir, flute, strings and organ
- Missa brevis in Es (Nr. 4) for soloists, choir, clarinet, violin, double bass and organ
