= Bassoon Quintet (Waterhouse) =

Quintet by Graham Waterhouse

- by Graham Waterhouse
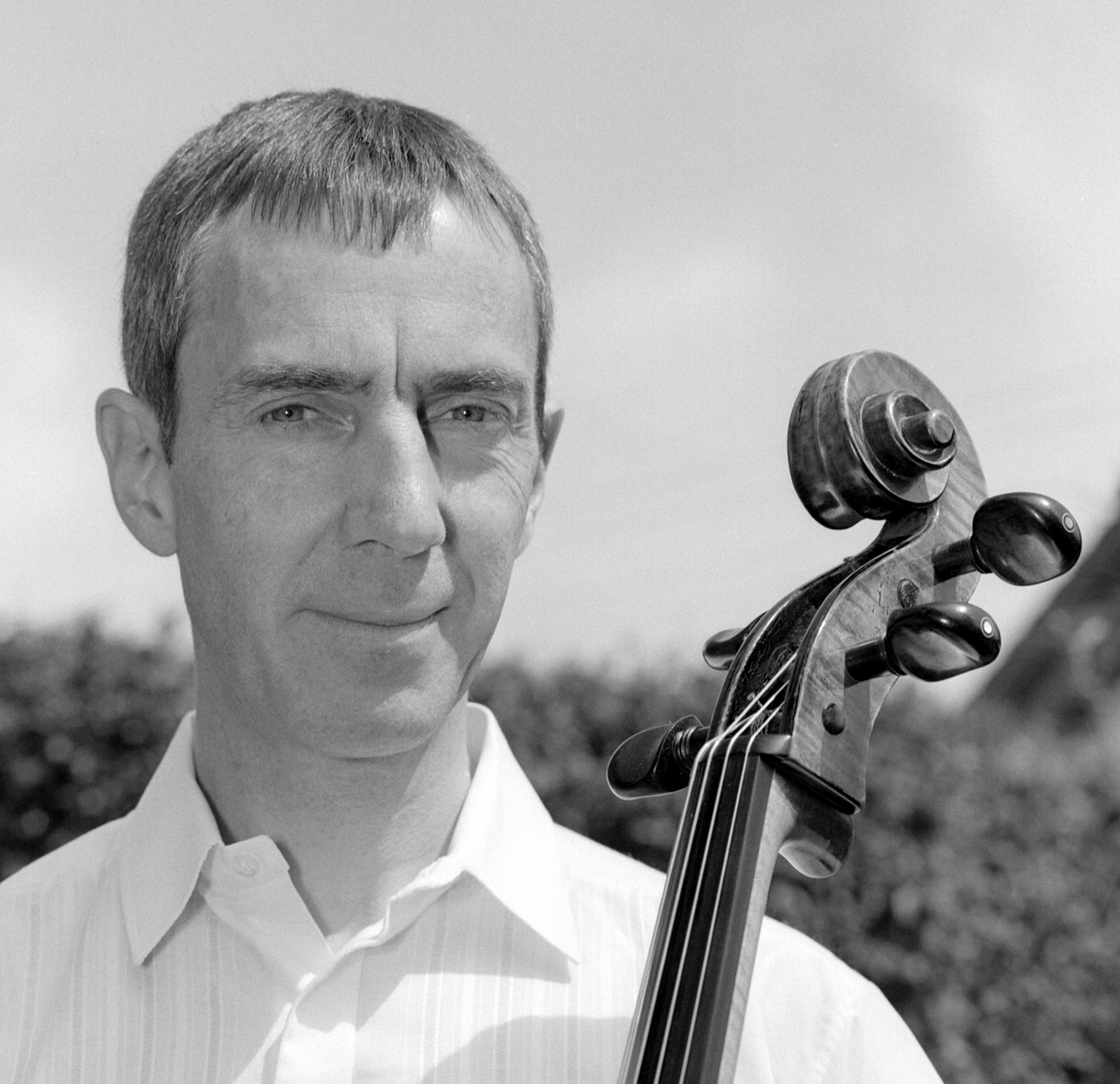
- Composer Graham Waterhouse, 2011
- Year: 2003
- Period: contemporary
- Form: quintet
- Movements: 3
- Scoring: bassoon, two violins, viola, cello

Premiere
- Date: 5 October 2003
- Location: Gasteig Munich
- Conductor: Yaron Traub
- Performers: Lyndon Watts

The Bassoon Quintet (German: Fagott-Quintett) is a quintet by Graham Waterhouse, composed in 2003 for bassoon and string quartet.

== History ==
In 2003 Graham Waterhouse composed the Bassoon Quintet, to be premiered as part of a composer's portrait concert at the Gasteig. On 5 October 2003 music for one to ten players, conducted by Yaron Traub, was performed in the Kleiner Konzertsaal, including the Piccolo Quintet. The bassoon part was first played by Lyndon Watts, the principal bassoonist of the Münchner Philharmoniker, in the presence of bassoonist William Waterhouse, the composer's father. The string quartet was formed by Odette Couch, Kirsty Hilton, Isabel Charisius and the composer.

A revised version was performed in Munich on 14 March 2011 in a chamber concert of the Bavarian Tonkünstlerverband (Musical Artists' Association). The soloist was again Watts, who also premiered Bernd Redmann's Migrant for bassoon and string quartet, and played the first of four quartets for a woodwind instrument and string trio, called "Finnische Quartette", by Jörg Duda. The string players, besides the composer, were members of the Münchner Philharmoniker, Clément Courtin, Namiko Fuse and Konstantin Sellheim.

The quintet is in preparation to be published by Zimmermann. It was played in concerts to celebrate the composer's 50th birthday in Munich and Frankfurt.

== Music ==
As in the composer's Cello Concerto of 1995, the movements of the quintet are in the sequence "slow introduction – fast – slow – fast". The introduction presents characteristic intervals and the wide tessitura of the bassoon, a range of three and a half octaves. The predominantly "lyrical mood" of the work is also established. "Restless energy" defines the Allegro movement, a four note motif is passed between cello and bassoon, later dominating figuration in the bassoon part.

The slow movement is reminiscent of the composer's memories of liturgical Armenian chant, which he experienced in 1996 in the Armenian district of Jerusalem around Easter. He describes: "The meandering line, continually curling back on itself and the resonance of the massive, ancient stone walls are mirrored in the writing, as continually shifting, changing fragments of the "chant" are passed between the instruments".

The last movement has a more symphonic aspect. The strings and the bassoon play arpeggio motifs in open intervals such as fifths and major sixths. The intervals of the introduction reappear on high harmonics in the strings. A virtuoso coda concludes the work.
