= Jenny Barraclough =

British film and television producer

Jennifer Ann Barraclough OBE (born 2 May 1937) is a British film and television producer. Much of her work is in television documentaries. She has also been involved in a number of trusts and charities. They include the Grierson Trust (Chairman between 2006 and 2009) and LEPRA (Chairman between 2007 and 2011) and the Razumovsky Ensemble of which she is a Trustee.

Barraclough was educated at St Brandon's School (Somerset), Millfield (Somerset), and St Hilda's College, Oxford, where she achieved a BA Hons in English.

Barraclough was one of the first women television producers. Barraclough's film Gale is Dead (1971) was one of the first to draw attention to young homeless and drug addicts and contributed to the establishment of a House of Commons committee. Her film Women in Prison in 1972 (which won a BAFTA) was the first film to be shot in a women's prison in the UK. In the 1980s she made two films on Queen Elizabeth II and two on 10 Downing Street for BBC One. Barraclough also produced films on the arts, including one on the Royal Academy Summer Exhibition and a major series on the London Symphony Orchestra in 1986.

Barraclough's films on AIDS helped promote understanding of the disease in its early days. Barraclough also produced other series focused on medicine, including series on transplant surgery and the history of cancer. Films for BBC World have included projects on leprosy (2001), vaccination (2004), and international efforts to prevent the spread of avian flu. In 2005 Barraclough produced a widely distributed film on the MMR vaccine for the Department of Health.

She was made a member of two BBC think tanks.

Barraclough was appointed Officer of the Order of the British Empire (OBE) in the 2009 Birthday Honours.

== Professional career ==
| Dates | Achievement |
|---|---|
| 1963 | TV Reporter in ITV News |
| 1964–66 | Researcher, then Director/Producer World in Action (Granada Television) |
| 1966-66 | Presenter on late night discussion programmes, Director/Producer on This Week (Rediffusion) |
| 1968–1988 | Director/Producer Man Alive series, then many one-off documentaries. Several international awards. |
| 1970s | Member BFI Production Board |
| 1986–88 | Head of BBC1 Documentaries |
| 1988 | Founder and Head of Programmes for multi award-winning independent, Barraclough Carey Productions, with George Carey. |
| 1997 | Merged with Mentorn to become Mentorn Barraclough Carey |
| 1999 | Mentorn Barraclough Carey became part of TV Corporation Group |
| 2000 | Director Barraclough Productions, making major global health programmes for BBC World. |
| 2001 | Member of Executive Board of LEPRA (International Leprosy Charity) |
| 2004 | Trustee Razumovsky Trust (inc. Razumovsky Ensemble and Academy) |
| 1996–2006 | Trustee Grierson Trust (Grierson Best Documentary Awards) |
| 2006–2008 | Chairman Grierson Trust |
| 2007-2011 | Chairman LEPRA |

== Films broadcast ==
=== For the BBC ===
| Dates | Film |
|---|---|
| 1971 | Gale Is Dead |
| 1972 | Women in Prison; Numerous programmes for 'Man Alive' |
| 1972 | Its Ours Whatever They Say |
| 1973 | Alright we'll do it ourselves |
| 1974 | The Bomb Disposal Men |
| 1974 | Big Smile Please |
| 1975 | A Day in Hyde Park |
| 1975 | Terrorism – Parts 1 and 2 |
| 1976 | The Royal Academy Summer Exhibition |
| 1976 | I'ndian Summer (Ooty) |
| 1977 | Bombay Superstar (The Indian film industry) |
| 1977 | Black American Dream (the legacy of Martin Luther King) |
| 1978 | The Diplomatic Style of Andrew Young |
| 1979 | Go Tell It to the Judge (the legal battle of the Banabans of Ocean Island) |
| 1980 | Portrait of a 'Terrorist (Robert Mugabe) |
| 1981 | Repeat of Gale is Dead as one of the best BBC docs ever ("Tonight belongs to Jenny Barraclough, a producer whose programmes have been delighting and moving me by turns since I started writing about television", Chris Dunkley Financial Times) |
| 1981 | The Royal Wedding – "Not only Charles and Diana but also..." |
| 1982 | Not in a Thousand Years (Robert Mugabe) |
| 1982 | Mr Gandhi and Mr Attenborough |
| 1982 | Hang on I'll Just Speak to the World (Anniversary of World Service) |
| 1983 | Elisabeth – the first 30 years |
| 1983 | ..and the Queen passed by |
| 1984 | John Paul's People (the British Catholics) |
| 1985 | No 10 Downing Street |
| 1985 | Living Above the Shop (Mrs Thatcher in No 10) |
| 1986 | Dancing in the Rain (Ballroom dancing) |
| 1986 | Happy Birthday Dear Ma'am as in Jam (Queen's birthday) |
| 1987 | Life at Stake (air crash survival) |
| 1988 | Fourteen Days in May (Executive Producer) |

=== Barraclough Carey Productions ===
| Dates | Film |
|---|---|
| 1991 | Redemption Song (History of the Caribbean) |
| 1991 | Frontiers – South Africa and Mozambique with Nadine Gordimer |
| 1993 | The Plague (History of AIDS), 4 part series; produced 'Hunting the Virus' and 'The End of the Beginning' (C4 and Discovery) |
| 1994 | Lost Children of Angola (C4) |
| 1995 | Knife to the Heart (History of Transplant Surgery) – 4 parts (BBC and WNET) |
| 1997 | Two films in the 'Lost Civilizations' series – Aegean and Greece (Time Life/NBC) |
| 1998 | Cancer Wars (The History of Cancer) 4 part series (C4 and WNET) "a scrapnel-sharp new series... absorbing"(Time Out) "this excellent series" (Sunday Times) |
| 1999 | Whatever happened to the Plague? (C4) – 90 min special |
| 1999 | The Real Pinochet (C4) |
| 2000 | Do Bras Cause Cancer? (C4) |
| 2000 | Elephant Hospital – illegal logging (National Geographic) |
| 2000 | Secrets of the Dead (C4 and WNET) |
| 2001 | The Private Life of Guiseppi Verdi BBC4, AVRO, ARTE, and ZDF |
| 2001 | The New Face of Leprosy (BBC WORLD and numerous local broadcasters) |
| 2004 | Fragile Lives – Immunization at Risk (BBC WORLD and numerous local broadcasters) |
| 2005 | MMR – what every mother should know (for the Ministry of Health) |
| 2007 | Calm Before the Storm (avian flu) (BBCWORLD and numerous local broadcasters) |
| 2013 | Blitz Over the Isle of Dogs (community project) |

== Awards ==
Jenny Barraclough won many awards for the BBC and for Barraclough Carey (founded in 1988, later Mentorn Barraclough Carey) which won many international awards for its documentaries, both singles and multi-part.

=== Best documentary awards ===
| Title | Award |
|---|---|
| Gale Is Dead | 1971 – BAFTA, International Critics Award and Catholic Church's Jury Award |
| Women in Prison | 1972 – BAFTA |
| Its Ours Whatever They Say | 1972 – London Film Festival, and Venice Biennale |
| The Bomb Disposal Men' | 1974 – BAFTA nomination |
| A Day in Hyde Park | 1975 – Venice Biennale Gold |
| Mr Gandhi and Mr Attenborough | 1982 – US Television Academy Awards |
| Not in a Thousand Years | 1983 – International. Black Programming Consortium in US |
| Frontiers (series) | 1989 – ACE (National Academy of Cable Programmes) award in US |
| The Plague (series on AIDS) | 1993 – Royal Television Society and EMMY nomination. |
| Lost Civilisations (The Aegean) | 1995 – EMMY and GOLDEN EAGLE awards in US |
| Lost Civilisations (5th-century BC Athens) | 1995 – EMMY and GOLDEN EAGLE awards |
| Fragile Lives – Immunization at Risk | 2005 – Denver International World Cinema Award |

== Trusts and charity ==
Barraclough was trustee and Chairman of the Grierson Trust which plays a leading role in supporting the quality documentary in the UK at a time when it is threatened by ratings and other commercial imperatives. As trustee she helped expand the event from a single award to an event with nine categories, and as Chairman she initiated many new ideas including the specially commissioned films by young 'Newcomers'. She expanded the Trust's activities into many new areas, like staging the popular National Film Theatre events that highlight ethical and other issues in documentary-making, mounting Master Classes with DocHouse where leading documentary makers share their skills with their audiences, and supporting festivals that honour the documentary. She helped initiate three new Grierson Sheffield Awards at the Sheffield International Documentary Festival: the 'most innovative', best 'green' film and a 'youth award' for the film most admired by young audiences.

Jenny Barraclough made the influential programme The New Face of Leprosy in 2001 which was shown to 27 million people on BBC World and then shown by many individual national networks and also by educational groups throughout the affected countries. As a Member of the Executive Board of LEPRA she helped make decisions on the treatment of leprosy, TB and AIDS among thousands of people on three continents, speaking on the organisation's behalf and making fund raising films for them. She became chairman in 2007 and worked closely with the CEO in managing a charity with a £12 million annual income and employing over 4,500 worldwide.

She is a trustee of the Razumovsky Trust, which is the trust of the Razumovsky Ensemble and Academy. The Academy helps outstanding young musicians reach international standard and encourages classical music in some of London’s less privileged schools.
