= Reptiles (M. C. Escher) =

1943 lithograph by M. C. Escher

- Artist: M. C. Escher
- Year: 1943
- Type: Lithograph
- Dimensions: 33.4 cm × 38.5 cm (13.1 in × 15.2 in)

Reptiles is a lithograph print by the Dutch artist M. C. Escher first printed in March 1943. It touches on the theme found in much of his work of mathematics in art.

== Work ==
Reptiles depicts a desk upon which is a two-dimensional drawing of a tessellated pattern of reptiles and hexagons, M. C. Escher's 1939 Regular Division of the Plane. The reptiles at one edge of the drawing emerge into three-dimensional reality, come to life and appear to crawl over a series of symbolic objects (a book on nature, a geometer's triangle, a dodecahedron, a pewter bowl containing a box of matches and a box of cigarettes) to eventually re-enter the drawing at its opposite edge. Other objects on the desk are a potted cactus and yucca, a ceramic flask with a cork stopper next to a small glass of liquid, a book of JOB cigarette rolling papers, and an open handwritten note book of many pages. Although only the size of small lizards, the reptiles have protruding crocodile-like fangs, and the one atop the dodecahedron has a dragon-like puff of smoke billowing from its nostrils.

Once a woman telephoned Escher and told him that she thought the image was a "striking illustration of reincarnation".

The critic Steven Poole commented that one of Escher's "enduring fascinations" was "the contrast between the two-dimensional flatness of a sheet of paper and the illusion of three-dimensional volume that can be created with certain marks" when space and flatness exist side by side and are "each born from and returning to the other, the black magic of the artistic illusion made creepily manifest."

== In popular culture ==
A colorized version of the lithograph was used by the rock band Mott the Hoople as the sleeve artwork for its eponymous first album, released in 1969.

== Music ==
In 1993, Graham Waterhouse composed a piano trio, Four Epigraphs after Escher, in four movements, with the final one based on Reptiles.

== Sources ==
- Locher, J. L. (1971). The World of M. C. Escher. Abrams. ISBN 978-0-451-79961-6.
- Locher, J. L. (2006). The Magic of M. C. Escher. Thames and Hudson. ISBN 978-0500512890.
