= Lyndon Watts =

Australian bassoonist (born 1976)

Lyndon Jeffrey Frank Watts
- Born: January 19, 1976 (age 50)
- Genres: Classical music
- Website: lyndonwatts.com

Lyndon Jeffrey Frank Watts (born 19 January 1976) is an Australian bassoonist. He is principal bassoonist of the Münchner Philharmoniker and an academic teacher.

== Professional career ==
Watts studied the bassoon from 1988 and completed his senior school education at Newington College in 1993. He collaborated with the Sydney Symphony Orchestra from 1992 to 1993, winning prizes at Australian competitions. From 1994 he studied at the Hochschule für Musik und Theater München with Eberhard Marschall and, in 2000, finished his master's degree with distinction.

In 1997 Watts won the international music competition pacem in terris of Bayreuth. In 2000 he was awarded the Yamaha Scholarship for Woodwind Instruments, which he used to study Baroque bassoon from 2001 to 2005 with Alberto Grazzi in Verona. He won a third prize at the ARD International Music Competition in 2002, he was the first Australian woodwind player in the competition's history to win a prize, and an "award for the best interpretation of the commissioned work by Heinz Holliger", Klaus-ur from Three Pieces for bassoon. Holliger's composition was recorded by the Bayerischer Rundfunk on the CD 21st Century Instrumental Solos, a collection of works commissioned by the ARD competition since 2002. On another recording of the prizewinners of 2002 he plays Mozart's bassoon concerto with the Münchener Kammerorchester.

Since 1998 Watts has been principal bassoonist of the Münchner Philharmoniker. He has also performed as a soloist with the Bavarian Radio Symphony Orchestra and the Münchener Kammerorchester. At the 2004 conference of the International Double Reed Society (IDRS) he appeared with the Melbourne Symphony Orchestra. He is a supporter of the Australian World Orchestra, founded in 2010.

As a chamber musician, he commissioned and first performed in 2001 the first of four quartets for a woodwind instrument and string trio, called "Finnische Quartette", by Jörg Duda. In 2003 he premiered the Bassoon Quintet of Graham Waterhouse at the Gasteig. At the 2009 IDRS conference in Birmingham he played in several recitals, for example with bassoonist Thomas Eberhardt Lacrimosa of Louis Andriessen, Holliger's Three Pieces, Sofia Gubaidulina's Duo for two bassoons, and the premiere of Bernd Redmann's Secret doors for two bassoons and orchestra. In December 2009 he took part in the festival of contemporary music Klangaktionen in Munich. In 2011 he premiered Redmann's Migrant for bassoon and string quartet in Munich.

Playing a Baroque bassoon built by Peter de Koningh after Eichentopf, Watts recorded arrangements of arias from Handel's operas, "The Gentleman's Flute", in an ensemble with Stefan Temmingh, recorder, and his wife Olga Watts, harpsichord, among others.

Watts was one of 16 bassoonists in the concert The Proud Bassoon, celebrating William Waterhouse on 16 April 2011 in Wigmore Hall. He played Waterhouse's arrangement for two bassoon choirs of Giovanni Gabrieli's Sonata Pian' e Forte, Anton Reicha's Quintet for bassoon and strings, on an 1807 instrument from Waterhouse's collection, and the Divertissement for bassoon and string quintet of Jean Francaix, dedicated to Waterhouse.

Watts taught the bassoon at the Hochschule für Musik und Theater München between 2002 and 2007, and has worked as a professor at the Bern University of the Arts since October 2005. He has conducted regular courses in Switzerland and Germany, and masterclasses in England, Portugal, Australia, Japan, China and Korea, such as a masterclass of the Australasian Double Reed Society in 2008. He has been a teacher for the Junge Münchner Philharmonie.
