= Celtic Voices and Hale Bopp =

Chamber music

Hale Bopp
- by Graham Waterhouse
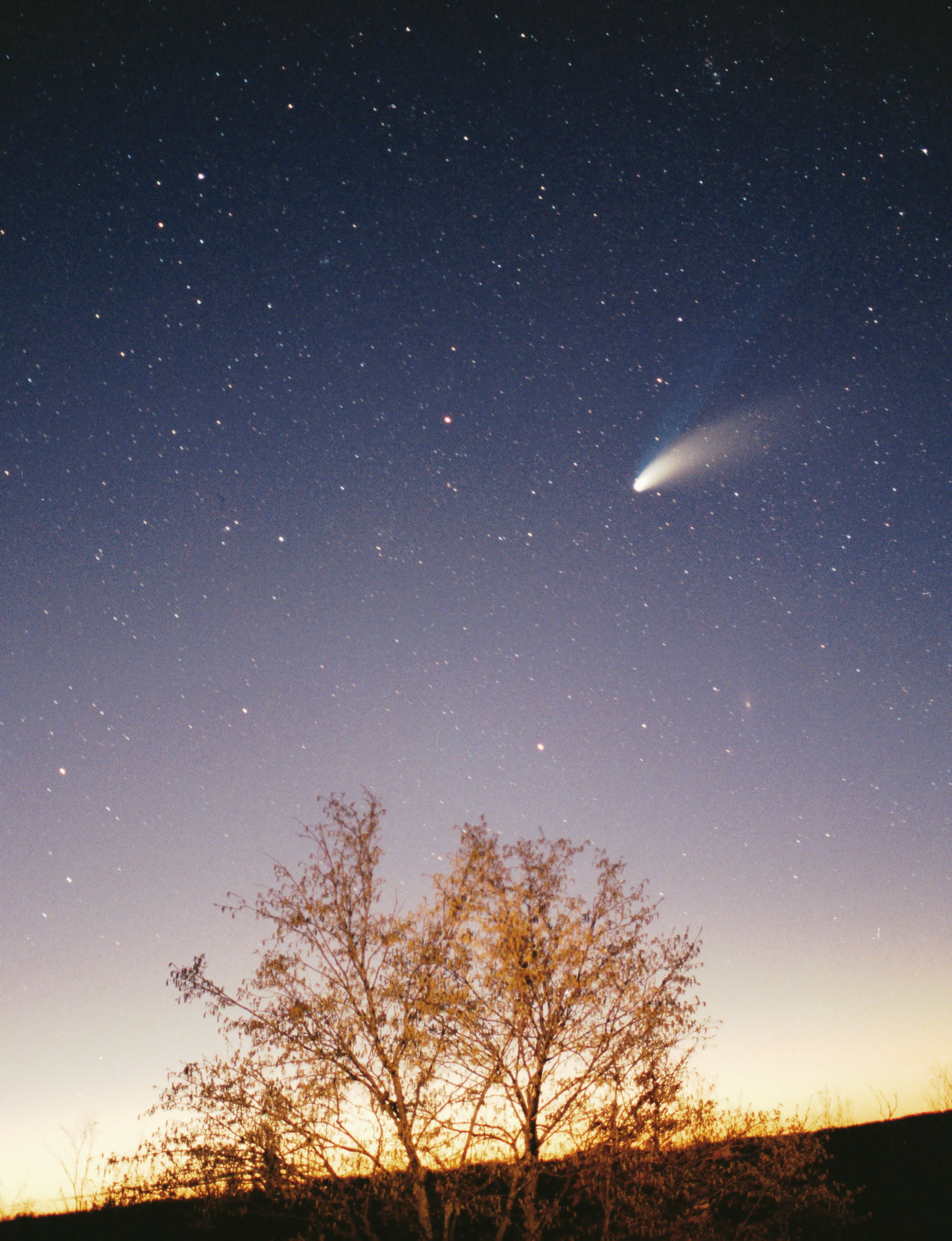
- Comet Hale–Bopp in 1997, the inspiration for the piece
- Opus: 36/2
- Year: 1997
- Period: contemporary
- Text: Philipp Nicolai: "How Brightly Shines the Morning Star" (Hale Bopp)
- Published: 1998: Leipzig Hofmeister
- Scoring: string orchestra, boy soprano

Celtic Voices
- by Graham Waterhouse
- Opus: 36/1
- Year: 1995
- Published: 1998: Leipzig Hofmeister
- Scoring: string orchestra

Celtic Voices and Hale Bopp, op. 36, are two independent compositions by Graham Waterhouse for string orchestra, which were published together in 1998 by Hofmeister, Leipzig. Celtic Voices was written in 1995, Hale Bopp was written in 1997 inspired by Comet Hale-Bopp, and scored for an additional boy soprano.

== Celtic Voices ==
Celtic Voices, op. 36/1, for string orchestra, a piece in one movement of about 5 minutes, was written in 1995. The composer comments: "While Celtic art refers to a definite style of decoration, the sources of Celtic music, being less clear, incorporate folk traditions from the Western fringes of the British Isles. This piece explores a predominantly lyrical vein." Ivan March wrote in his review for Gramophone magazine: "Celtic Voices similarly balances virtuosity with lyricism and dips into the Phrygian mode to establish its underlying harmonic flavour."

== Hale Bopp ==
Hale Bopp, op. 36/2, for string orchestra with an obbligato treble voice (or horn) was composed in 1997, inspired by the Comet Hale–Bopp, which was discovered on 23 July 1995 and dubbed the Great Comet of 1997.

The piece in one movement of about 7 minutes begins with tremolandi, glissandi and wide spaced scoring and ends with a quote of the chorale "How Brightly Shines the Morning Star", sung by a boy soprano accompanied by a string quartet. The original German hymn by Philipp Nicolai begins: "Wie schön leuchtet der Morgenstern" and was published in 1599. The composer comments: "Although strictly speaking the comet is not a star, each has its own place in the celestial firmament and has exercised a like fascination on man over the ages." The piece was premiered in 1997 with the Swiss Orchestre d'Yverdon, conducted by the composer. In Advent 2011, Hale Bopp was performed in Schloss Borbeck in a concert with Bach's cantata Nun komm, der Heiden Heiland, BWV 61, and the composer's Christmas cantata Der Anfang einer neuen Zeit (The Beginning of a New Time) on a text by the poet Hans Krieger.

== Publication and recording ==
The two pieces for a similar instrumentation were published together by Hofmeister, Leipzig, in 1998. They both were recorded in 2002 by the English Chamber Orchestra, conducted by Yaron Traub, as part of the CD Graham Waterhouse Portrait 2 for Meridian Records with music for string orchestra and wind ensemble. Between them appears Hymnus for winds, which also quotes a hymn tune, but only one line instrumentally like a refrain.

Hubert Culot commented, "Hale Bopp Op.36/2 ... opens with wide-spaced chords suggesting some other-worldly atmosphere and ends with a treble voice singing How brightly shines the Morning Star, accompanied by a string quartet. Though shorter and, on the whole, less astringent, this lovely piece may compared to Georges Lentz’s Caeli enarrant... III."
