= Variations on a Theme of Pachelbel =

1981 composition for organ by Graham Waterhouse

- by Graham Waterhouse
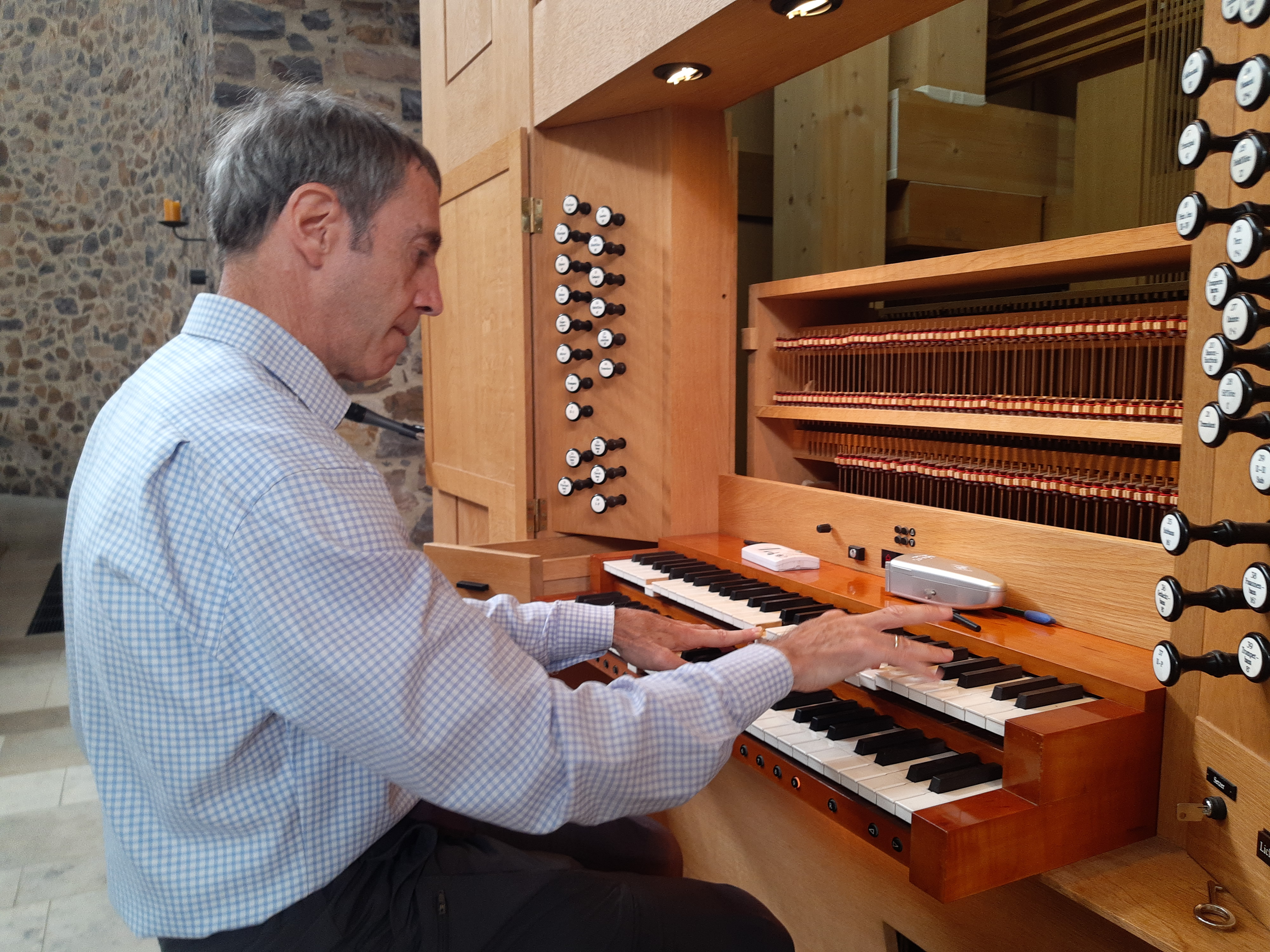
- The composer playing the piece in 2025
- Opus: 6
- Year: 1981
- Period: contemporary
- Published: 1997: Leipzig Hofmeister
- Movements: 11
- Scoring: organ

Variations on a Theme of Pachelbel (German: Variationen über ein Thema von Pachelbel), op. 6, is a composition for organ by Graham Waterhouse, written in 1981. A theme by Johann Pachelbel is followed by ten variations. The work was published by the Friedrich Hofmeister Musikverlag in 1997.

== History ==
Waterhouse composed the work in 1981. The theme is a chorale that Pachelbel had already treated to variation settings. It was published the same year by the Friedrich Hofmeister Musikverlag.
