= Katharina Sellheim =

German classical pianist

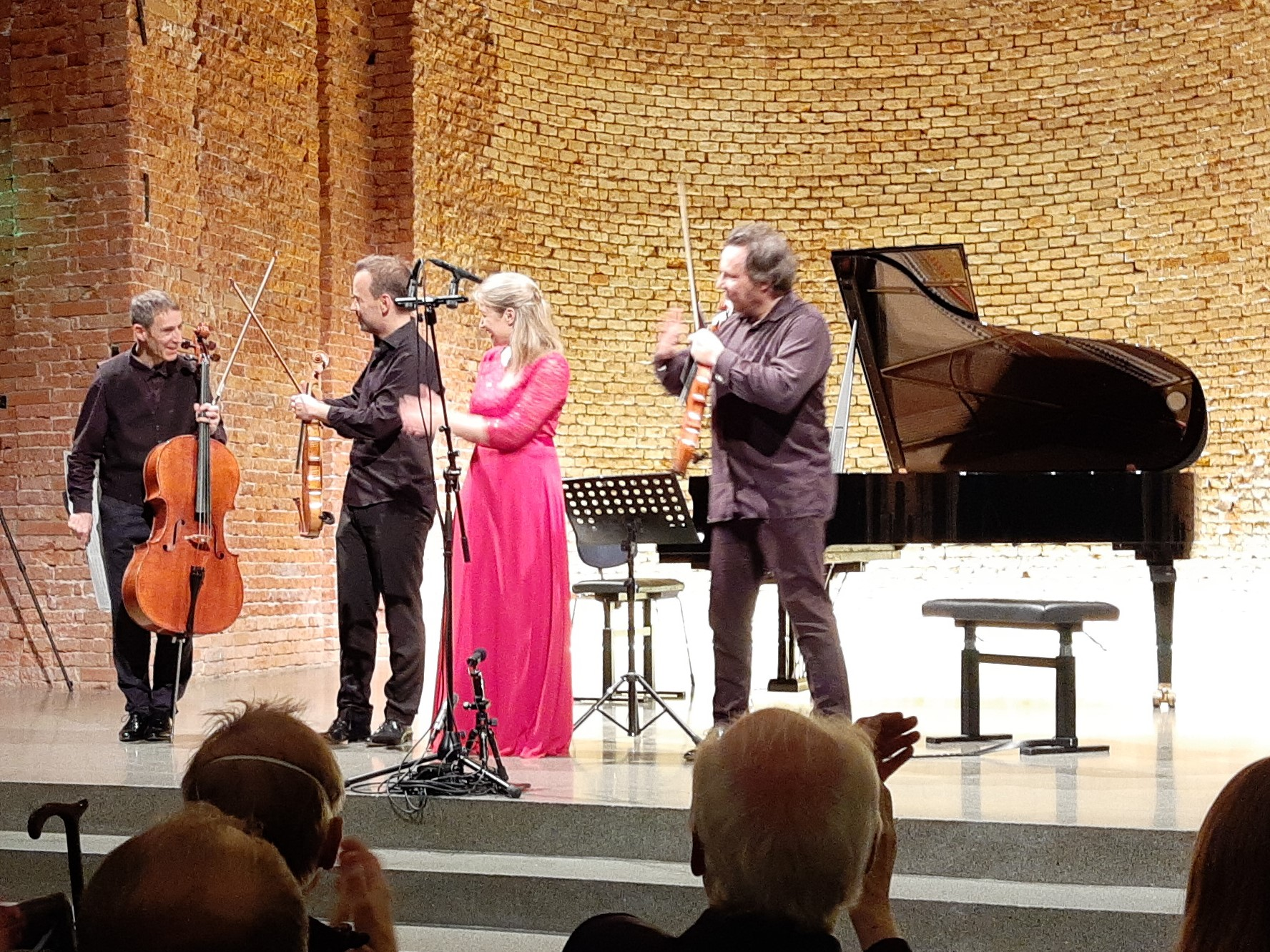
- Sellheim after a performance of Skylla und Charybdis by Graham Waterhouse at the Allerheiligen-Hofkirche in Munich on 5 November 2022, with the composer as the cellist (l.), her brother Konstantin Sellheim as the violist and violinist David Frühwirth (r.)
- Born: Rehren, Lower Saxony, Germany
- Education: Hochschule für Musik, Theater und Medien Hannover; École Normale de Musique de Paris
- Occupations: Pianist; Academic
- Website: www.katharina-sellheim.de

Katharina Sellheim is a German classical pianist, with a focus on chamber music and lied accompaniment. She has appeared in recitals internationally, collaborating with members of the Münchner Philharmoniker, and has been a lecturer at the Musikhochschule Hannover.

== Career ==
Born in Rehren the daughter of the cellist Friedrich-Jürgen Sellheim, Katharina appeared in public first in 1994, with her father. A year later she won first prize in the national competition Jugend musiziert in two categories, piano solo and vocal accompaniment. Sellheim studied at the Musikhochschule Hannover with Karl-Heinz Kämmerling and Markus Becker, and in Paris at the Ecole Normale de Musique Alfred Cortot with Germaine Mounier. She studied further with Paul Badura-Skoda, Eckart Sellheim, Norman Shetler and Dietrich Fischer-Dieskau. She received a scholarship of the Studienstiftung des Deutschen Volkes and the Deutscher Akademischer Austauschdienst. She achieved the first prize of the GEDOK competition in 2002.

Sellheim has accompanied prize-winners of competitions, such as the double bassist Nabil Shehata (ARD Competition) and the violinist Fumiaki Miura (Joseph Joachim Competition). She accompanied at master classes including their concerts of Fischer-Dieskau with lieder by Hugo Wolf on poems by Mörike and Goethe. She has played with her brother, the violist Konstantin Sellheim as the Duo Sellheim. They recorded a CD, Fantasy, of works by Robert Schumann, Paul Hindemith and Rebecca Clarke. Their combination of Hindemith's Fantasie-Sonate, Op. 11/4, Clark's Viola Sonata (both 1919), and Schumann's Fantasiestücke, Op. 73, and his Märchenbilder, Op. 113, was received as illuminating relations in music history. With the clarinetist László Kuti, they have performed as the Sellheim-Kuti-Trio.

She has performed as part of the Klaviertrio Hannover with violinist Lucja Madziar and cellist Johannes Krebs, including concerts at the Beethovenfest in Bonn, the Elbphilharmonie in Hamburg where they played Beethoven's Piano Trio, Op. 1/3, Bells of Beyond by Graham Waterhouse, Mendelssohn's Piano Trio No. 2. and Rachmaninovs Trio élégiaque No. 2.

Together with the Klaviertrio Hannover and her brother Konstantin Sellheim, viola, she recorded a CD of Beethoven's Piano Quartets, WoO 36 1-3 and Op. 16a (in collaboration with Südwestdeutscher Rundfunk and record label Genuin).

The contemporary composer Graham Waterhouse engaged her to record his new CD Skylla and Charybdis (record label Farao Classics) together with the composer, the violinists David Frühwirth and Namiko Fuhse and her brother Konstantin Sellheim, viola.

Sellheim has collaborated with members of the Münchner Philharmoniker. She has been lecturer at the Musikhochschule Hannover from 2007. She gave masterclasses in China and Estonia, among others. On an invitation by the Barenboim–Said Academy, she lectured in Ramallah and Jerusalem.
