= William Waterhouse (bassoonist) =

English bassoonist and musicologist

- William Waterhouse, c. 1980
- Born: 18 February 1931; London, UK
- Died: 5 November 2007 (aged 76); Florence, Italy
- Education: Royal College of Music
- Occupations: Bassoonist; Musicologist; Academic teacher
- Organizations: Melos Ensemble; British Double Reed Society; Royal Northern College of Music
- Spouse: Elisabeth Waterhouse

William Waterhouse (18 February 1931 – 5 November 2007) was an English bassoonist and musicologist. He played with notable orchestras, was a member of the Melos Ensemble, professor at the Royal Northern College of Music, author of the Yehudi Menuhin Music Guide "Bassoon", of The New Langwill Index, and contributor to the New Grove Dictionary of Music and Musicians.

== Biography and career as a performer ==
Born in London, Waterhouse began taking bassoon lessons from Vernon Elliott, then studied bassoon at the Royal College of Music with Archie Camden, viola with Cecil Aronowitz, and harmony with the composer Gordon Jacob. From 1953 to 1955, he was second bassoonist in the orchestra of the Royal Opera at Covent Garden at the time of Maria Callas, Tito Gobbi, and Kirsten Flagstad. Later he stated that his most valuable lessons in phrasing were actually learned playing in the pit while accompanying opera singers. From 1955 until 1958 he played in the Orchestra della Svizzera Italiana in Lugano. He was the principal bassoonist in the London Symphony Orchestra (1958–1965), and in the BBC Symphony Orchestra (1965–1982), playing under such conductors as Cantelli, Toscanini, Furtwängler, Monteux, Karajan, Klemperer and Boulez.

Waterhouse was married to the pianist and music teacher Elisabeth Waterhouse. The composer and cellist Graham Waterhouse is their son. Violinist and teacher Celia Milner of the BBC Symphony Orchestra and freelance violinist and teacher Lucy Waterhouse are their daughters.

William Waterhouse died in 2007 in Florence.

=== Chamber musician ===
William Waterhouse was a member of the Melos Ensemble from 1959 and participated with the group in the premiere of the War Requiem by Benjamin Britten, conducted by the composer. He recorded all the wind chamber music by Beethoven, and works by Nielsen, Janáček, Poulenc, Schubert and Jean Françaix with the ensemble. He wrote in 1995: "It was the remarkable rapport between this pair of lower strings" (i.e. Terence Weil and Cecil Aronowitz) "which remained constant throughout a succession of distinguished leaders, that gave a special distinction to this outstanding ensemble."

He recorded with the Melos Ensemble, its principal players Richard Adeney and William Bennett (flute), Gervase de Peyer and Keith Puddy (clarinet), Stephen Trier (bass clarinet), Peter Graeme and Sarah Barrington (oboe), Neill Sanders and James Buck (horn), Edgar Williams (bassoon), Emanuel Hurwitz and Ivor McMahon (violin), Cecil Aronowitz (viola), Terence Weil (cello), Adrian Beers (double bass), Lamar Crowson (piano):

- Beethoven:
  - Quintet for piano and winds, Op. 16
  - March for Sextet in B flat major, WoO 29
  - Rondino in E flat major, WoO 25
  - Septet
  - Octet
  - Duo No. 1 in C major, WoO 27
- Schubert: Octet
- Franz Berwald: Septet
- Carl Nielsen: Wind Quintet
- Janáček: Mládí, Concertino
- Francis Poulenc: Trio for Oboe, Bassoon & Piano, Sonata for Clarinet & Bassoon
- Jean Françaix: Divertissement for Oboe, Clarinet and Bassoon, Divertissement for Bassoon and String Quintet (dedicated to him)
- Nikos Skalkottas: Octet
- Richard Rodney Bennett: Calendar
- Gordon Crosse: Concerto Da Camera
- Harrison Birtwistle: Tragoedia
- Peter Maxwell Davies: Leopardi Fragments

In 1974 he recorded Stockhausen's Adieu with the London Sinfonietta: Sebastian Bell (flute), Janet Craxton (oboe), Antony Pay (clarinet) and John Butterworth (horn), conducted by the composer.

=== Teacher ===
William Waterhouse was a professor at the Royal Northern College of Music from 1966 until 1996, when he served as Curator of the Collection of Historic Musical Instruments. He was awarded Fellowship of the College in 1991. In 1972, he became visiting professor at Indiana University, Bloomington. He was also guest professor in Melbourne and Banff.

=== Juror of international competitions ===
He served on the jury of the ARD Musikwettbewerb in Munich in 1965, 1975, 1984 and 1990, as well as in Prague, Eindhoven, Markneukirchen, Potsdam and Victoria BC.

=== The Proud Bassoon ===
William Waterhouse was celebrated in his 80th birthyear on 16 April 2011 in a Memorial Concert The Proud Bassoon in Wigmore Hall. Players included his three children, Gervase de Peyer and Timothy Brown as former members of the Melos Ensemble, players who succeeded him such as Roger Birnstingl (Orchestre de la Suisse Romande) and Julie Price (BBC Symphony Orchestra), bassoonists from around the world, such as Jim Kopp, Lyndon Watts and Takashi Yamakami, his students and a bassoon quartet from the RNCM, led by Stefano Canuti. All the music played related to him, his own arrangement of Giovanni Gabrieli's Sonata Pian' e Forte for two bassoon choirs, music dedicated to him, such as Gordon Jacob's Suite and the Divertissement of Jean Francaix, and music composed in his memory, his son's Bright Angel and Epitaphium. The concert ended with the final movement from Schubert's Octet, which he had often played and twice recorded with the Melos Ensemble. The program book includes a section of memories, titled "recollected in tranquility, a celebration", including a contribution of Karlheinz Stockhausen who wrote in 2007:

Not only in rehearsal, but also in many hours before and after rehearsals and recordings, and during our trips with the ensemble, I had the pleasure and privilege of sharing with William Waterhouse his rich cultural knowledge and enthusiasm. He was a musician as we all should be: excellent as a performer, open minded, curious, well educated, joyous, full of humour. I greet him in the beyond and hope to meet him again."

== Music dedicated to William Waterhouse ==
Gordon Jacob dedicated to him the Suite for bassoon and string quartet, first performed at the Cheltenham Festival on 8 July 1969 together with Emanuel Hurwitz, Ivor McMahon, Cecil Aronowitz and Terence Weil, and the Partita for solo bassoon which Waterhouse premiered on 27 October 1977 in Wigmore Hall. Jean Françaix dedicated his 1942 Divertissement for bassoon and string quintet (or orchestra) to him when it was published in 1968, also in 1994 his Trio for oboe, bassoon and piano. Victor Bruns dedicated his Trio op. 97 für Fagottino, Fagott und Kontrafagott to William Waterhouse. Stanley Weiner wrote a Sonata for Bassoon Solo op. 32. Graham Waterhouse dedicated Mouvements d'Harmonie and Hexenreigen to him and composed Phoenix Arising for bassoon and piano and Epitaphium as a tribute to his father's memory. In 2008 he composed the bassoon quartet Bright Angel, in memory of a hike with his father through the Grand Canyon.

== Author and editor ==
He contributed to the New Grove Dictionary of Music and Musicians and edited for the publishers Musica Rara, Hofmeister, and Universal Edition. Among the rare music he rediscovered is a sonata for bassoon and piano by Anton Liste (1772–1832) that he recorded in 1998 with William Fong. Lyndesay G. Langwill, who had published his Index of Musical Wind-Instrument Makers in book form from 1960 in six editions, had designated William Waterhouse as his successor and had left him his archive of correspondence and books, before he died in 1983. After ten years of research The New Langwill Index: A dictionary of musical wind-instrument makers and inventors was published. This important work of reference was awarded the C.B. Oldman prize in 1995. Posthumously he received the Curt Sachs Award of the American Musical Instrument Society on 31 May 2008.

=== Selected publications ===
- The New Langwill Index: A dictionary of musical wind-instrument makers and inventors, 1st edition 1993
- Bassoon (Yehudi Menuhin Music Guides), Kahn & Averill, London 2001, 2005. ISBN 1-871082-68-4, 2003. Roger Birnstingl wrote in his review for the British Double Reed Society:
  There can be no-one alive more qualified than WW to write the definitive book on the bassoon.
- Fagott Translation of Bassoon to German by Klaus Gillessen, Bärenreiter, 2006, ISBN 3-7618-1871-8
- Weber's Bassoon Concerto Op. 75: The Manuscript and Printed Sources Compared

== Double reed societies ==
Waterhouse was one of the co-founders of the British Double Reed Society in 1988 and was a member of the Society's Committee until his death in 2007. The IDRS 2009, the annual conference of the International Double Reed Society in Birmingham, was dedicated to him and Evelyn Barbirolli.

== Legacy ==
The International Chair in Chamber Music & Bassoon of the RNCM is titled in his name.
