= David Frühwirth =

Austrian violinist

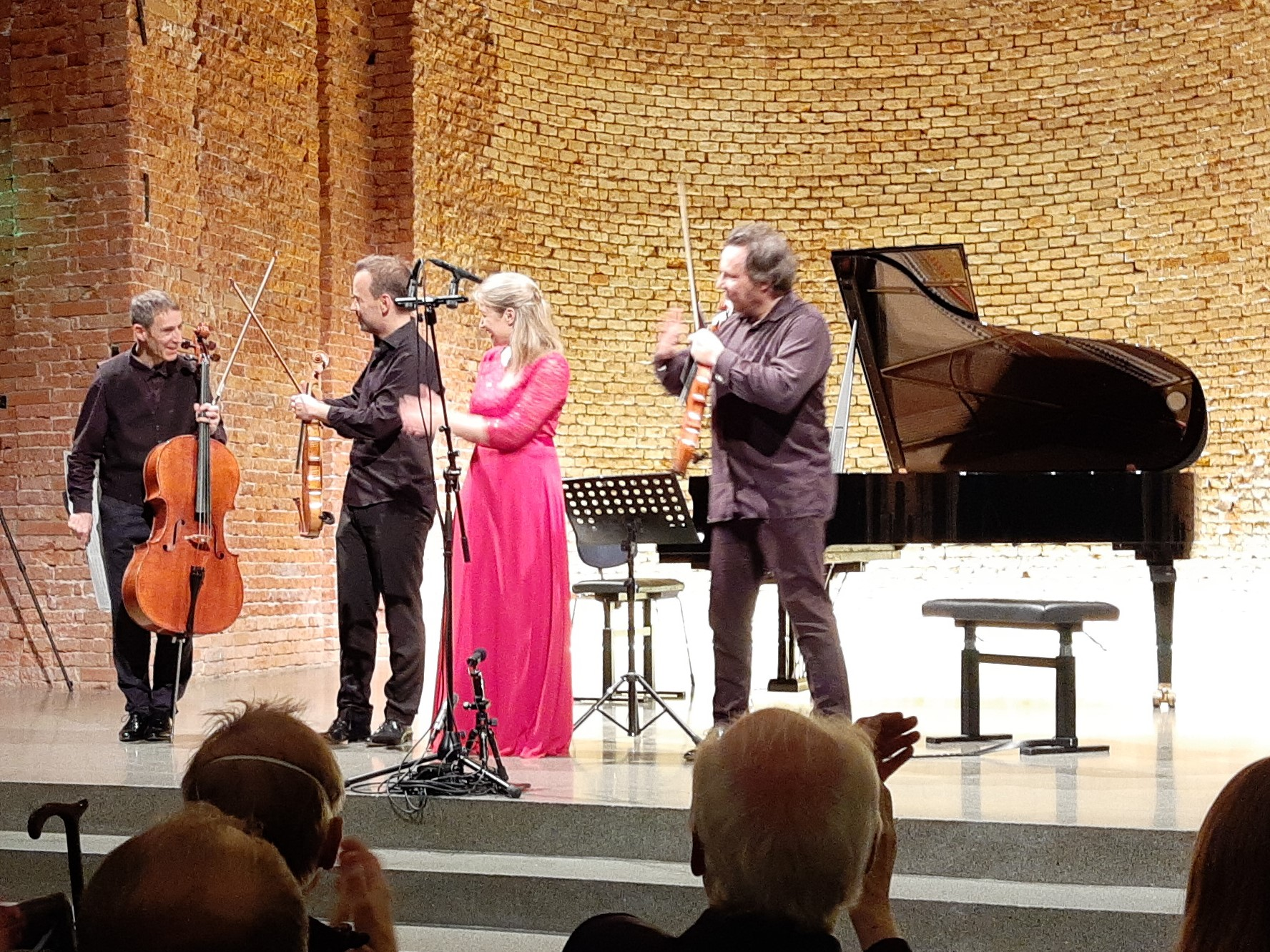
- Frühwirth (r.) after a performance of Skylla und Charybdis by Graham Waterhouse at the Allerheiligen-Hofkirche in Munich on 5 November 2022, with the composer as the cellist, violist Konstantin Sellheim and pianist Katharina Sellheim
- Born: 15 June 1974 (age 51); Salzburg, Austria
- Education: Mozarteum
- Occupation: Classical violinist
- Website: www.davidviolin.com

David Frühwirth (born 15 June 1974) is an Austrian classical violinist. He has played internationally as a soloist and chamber musician, with a focus on contemporary music which he also recorded. He has given international master classes.

== Life and career ==
Born in Salzburg, Frühwirth began playing violin at age six. He made his debut at age eleven in the Mozarteum's great concert hall, playing Vivaldi's Four Seasons. He studied violin in the Mozarteum in his hometown with Paul Roczek and Ruggiero Ricci. He continued his studies in Germany from 1990 to 1995 with Zakhar Bron, graduating at age 20. On an invitation of Pinchas Zukerman, he took post-graduate studies with him in New York City, completing in 1998 with honours. He advanced chamber music playing with Jaime Laredo, Isidore Cohen and Walter Levin.

Frühwirth made his debut at the Salzburg Festival in 2004, performing with pianist Henri Sigfridsson music of the 20th century, music from Korngold's opera Das Wunder der Heliane, the Sonata in D by Hans Gál, William Walton's Toccata (1922/23), Korngold's Suite from his incidental music to Much Ado About Nothing, Op. 11 (1916), and Ernst Krenek's first Violin Sonata, Op. 3 (1919). The duo performed some of these works for a recording titled Trails of Creativity, featuring music from the interwar period. Frühwirth has played at international festivals such as Schleswig-Holstein Musik Festival and Cheltenham Festival. As a chamber music player, he has worked with Jörg Widmann, Alfredo Perl and Adrian Brendel, among others. He is the first violinist of the Klenze Quartett, Munich.

In 2013, he recorded music for violin and piano by Nikolai Rakov, including three sonatas, with Milana Chernyavska. Barry Brenesal noted in Fanfare about this only recording of the music: "Frühwirth has a lean, sleekly attractive tone. He negotiates Rakov’s moderate figurations without problems, and demonstrates a convincing grasp of Rakov’s phrasing and big-hearted manner." In 2015, he participated in a concert in Landsberg am Lech of English chamber music, including the String Sextet, Op. 1, by Graham Waterhouse.

Frühwirth has given master classes internationally, including the UCSI University in Manila. He plays on a Stradivari instrument from 1707 called "ex-Brüstlein", on loan from Oesterreichische Nationalbank.
