= Bassoon quintet =

A Bassoon quintet is a piece of chamber music for bassoon and four other instruments, normally a string quartet.

Quintets for bassoon and string quartet include the Quintet by Graham Waterhouse, Suite for bassoon and string quintet by Gordon Jacob, and works by Anton Reicha, including his Bassoon quintet and his Variations for bassoon and string quartet.
