= Charybdis (disambiguation) =

Charybdis is a sea monster in Greek mythology.

Charybdis may also refer to:

- Charybdis (crab), a genus of crabs
- Charybdis (comics), a fictional character in DC Comics
- 388 Charybdis, a main belt asteroid
- Charybdis Glacier, Antarctica
- Charybdis Icefalls, Antarctica
- HMS Charybdis, several ships of the Royal Navy
- Golden Charybdis Award at Taormina International Film Festival
- Karybdis (band), a London-based metal band
