= Bright Angel (Waterhouse) =

2008 composition by Graham Waterhouse

- Quartet for Bassoons by Graham Waterhouse
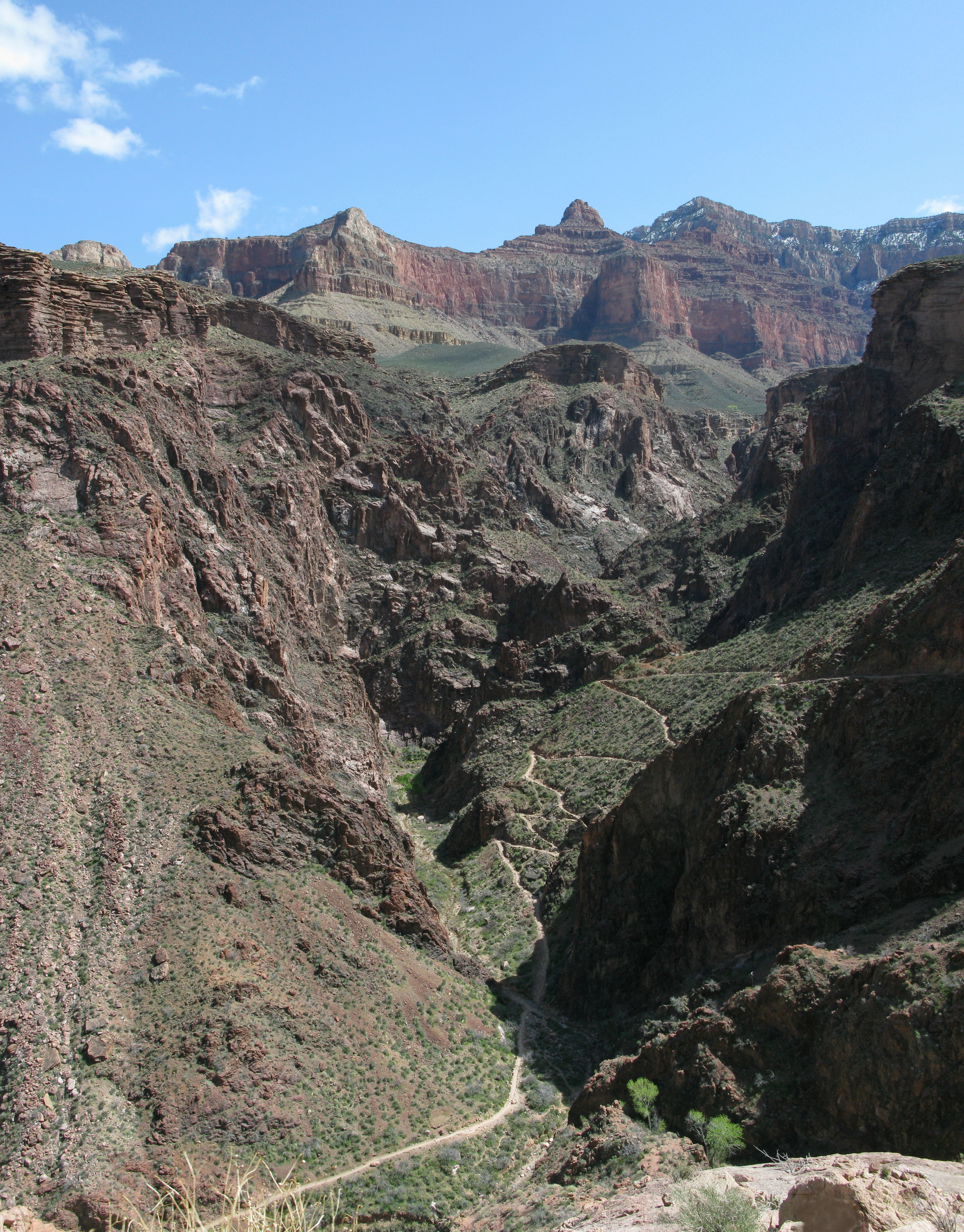
- Bright Angel Trail of the Grand Canyon, inspiration for the composition
- Period: contemporary
- Composed: 2008
- Published: 2009: Warngau Accolade
- Movements: 3
- Scoring: 3 bassoons; contrabassoon

Bright Angel is a composition for three bassoons and contrabassoon by Graham Waterhouse. It was composed in 2008 for the annual conference of the International Double Reed Society (IDRS). The title alludes to the Bright Angel Trail of the Grand Canyon.

== History ==
Graham Waterhouse composed Bright Angel for the IDRS Conference 2008 in Provo, Utah, and chose the theme of the composition to match the setting of the conference. He recalls a hike which he took, age nine, with his father William Waterhouse. In 1972, when the bassoonist taught for one year at Indiana University, they crossed the Grand Canyon from the North Rim to the South Rim, on the North Kaibab Trail and the Bright Angel Trail.

Bright Angel was premiered by Michel Bettez, Richard Ramey, Richard Moore and Henry Skolnick, conducted by the composer, at the Brigham Young University. It was published by the German publisher Accolade (Warngau) in 2009 as Bright Angel für 3 Fagotte und Kontrafagott.

Bright Angel was part of a concert The Proud Bassoon, celebrating William Waterhouse on 16 April 2011 in Wigmore Hall. It was performed by the Bassoon Quartet from the Royal Northern College of Music in Manchester, where William Waterhouse had been a teacher of bassoon and a curator of the instrument collection. The players were James Thomas, Linda Begbie and Stefano Canuti, bassoon, and Jonathan Jones, contrabassoon, led by Canuti who is "International Chair in Bassoon" at the RNCM, and Professor at the Conservatorio Superior de Aragon. The performance was the premiere of Bright Angel in the United Kingdom. The composer's string trio Epitaphium, originally composed for his father's memorial service, was also part of the concert program.

== Music ==
The composer comments:

The piece tries to reflect a sense of wonder and awe at both the majesty and the brutality of Nature. Some of the contours (or recollections of them) are mirrored in the variously undulating and jagged lines. Also recalled during the composition were the perpetually shifting vistas, as well as the toil of tramping out the dusty trail, stumbling over boulders, cowering during a storm. The musical material is mostly contained within the opening motive, first heard as a solitary voice, before recurring over a wide-spanning accompaniment of arpeggios. The slow, reflective introduction gives way to a faster section, based on an energetic, pulsating rhythm. It is to the tranquil mood of the opening that the work eventually returns, closing on an unresolved chord, to capture the eternity of the Canyon.

After the concert in Wigmore Hall, the reviewer described an arch between a "deep, grumbling opening and ending (rather like Richard Strauss’s An Alpine Symphony)" and the "various moods of the route in an engagingly atmospheric piece".
