= Phoenix Arising =

Composition for bassoon and piano by Graham Waterhouse

- Tribute to William Waterhouse
- Chamber music by Graham Waterhouse
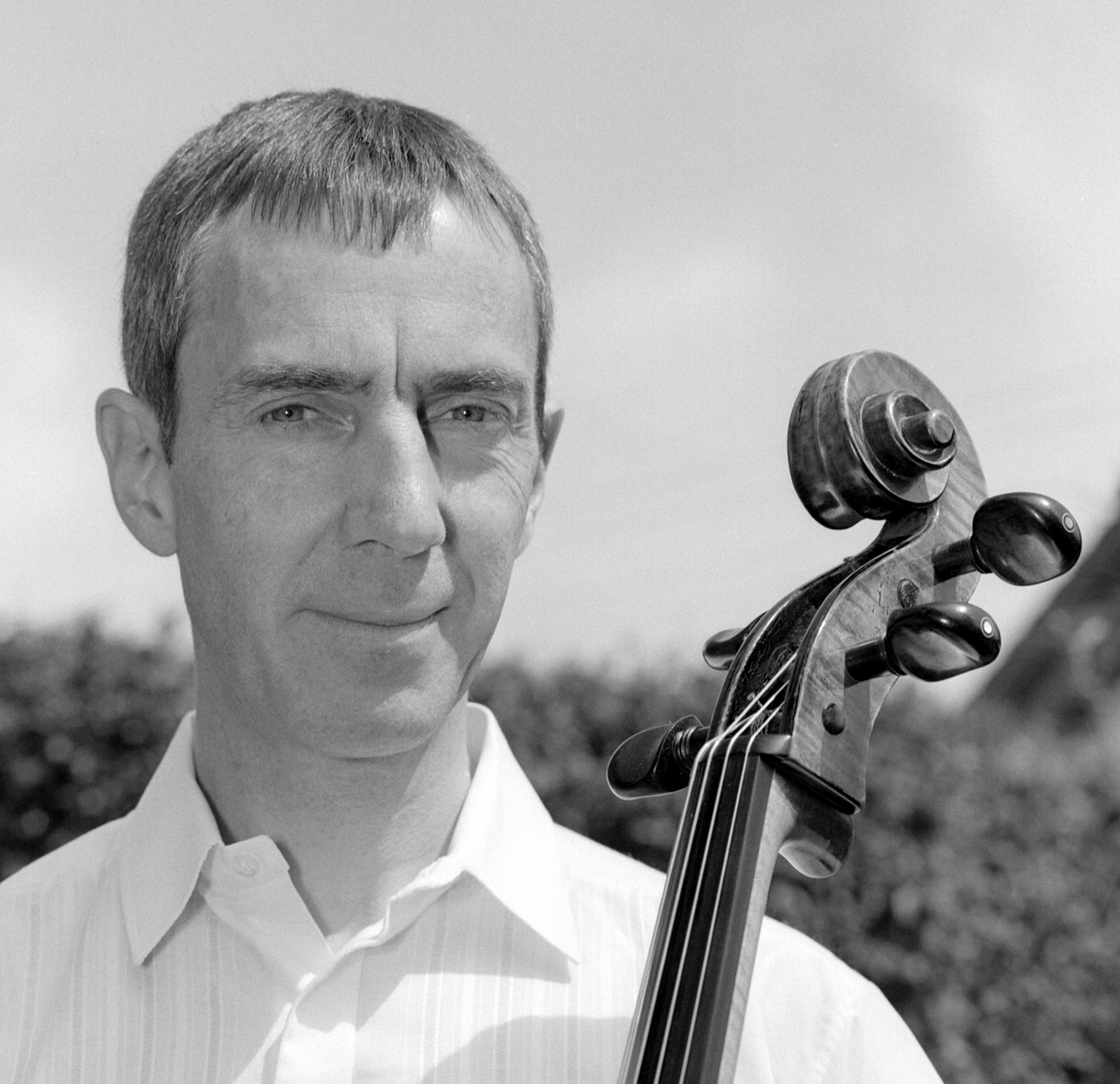
- The composer in 2011
- Period: contemporary
- Performed: 9 January 2009: London
- Scoring: bassoon; piano

Phoenix Arising is a composition for bassoon and piano by Graham Waterhouse, who wrote it in 2008 in memory of his father, the bassoonist and musicologist William Waterhouse. It premiered in London in 2009, and was published by Accolade the same year.

== History ==
Waterhouse composed Phoenix Arising in 2008 in memory of his father, the bassoonist William Waterhouse, who was the bassoonist of the Melos Ensemble and a notable scholar. Subtitled Tribute to William Waterhouse, it was commissioned by the Park Lane Group in London, and first performed on 9 January 2009 in the Purcell Room of the Southbank Centre by the bassoonist Rosemary Burton and the pianist Christopher White. The players performed it again in a concert "In memoriam William Waterhouse" at the Berlin Musical Instrument Museum on 24 April 2009, arranged by the Deutsche Gesellschaft für Oboe und Fagott. The program featured also works which William Waterhouse had published, other compositions dedicated to him such as the Trio for fagottino, bassoon and contrabassoon, Op. 97 (1992) by Victor Bruns and Gordon Jacob's Suite for bassoon and string quartet, and Karlheinz Stockhausen's In Freundschaft.

Phoenix Arising was published by Accolade in 2009. The work is part of the repertory for bassoonists, and has been used in university training and played in recitals.

== Composition ==
The work is in one movement of several sections. The composer thought of his father, "of his phenomenal energy, his restless intellectual curiosity, as well as his deep conviction in the broad expressive possibilities of 'his' instrument". The composition reflects the lyrical and virtuoso qualities of the bassoon. It features elements characteristic for William Waterhouse's playing, such as arpeggios of fourths, his "long, visceral, low 'B-flats'", and his warm-up of "32nds from top to bottom". In a section marked cantabile, the bassoon "aspires to a voice-like role", in memory of William Waterhouse's "ideal for wind players to strive for".
