= Lewis Hugh Cooper =

American musician (1920–2007)

Lewis Hugh Cooper (December 31, 1920 – April 26, 2007) was professor of bassoon at the University of Michigan School of Music (now School of Music, Theatre & Dance) for 52 years, beginning in 1945 when he joined the Detroit Symphony as second bassoonist. He was an internationally recognized expert on bassoon design and acoustics, repair, pedagogy, and performance.

Cooper also consulted with the Püchner company, finishing and adjusting each new bassoon before giving it the "Cooper model" imprimatur.
