= Mouvements d'Harmonie =

Composition for wind ensemble by Graham Waterhouse

- by Graham Waterhouse
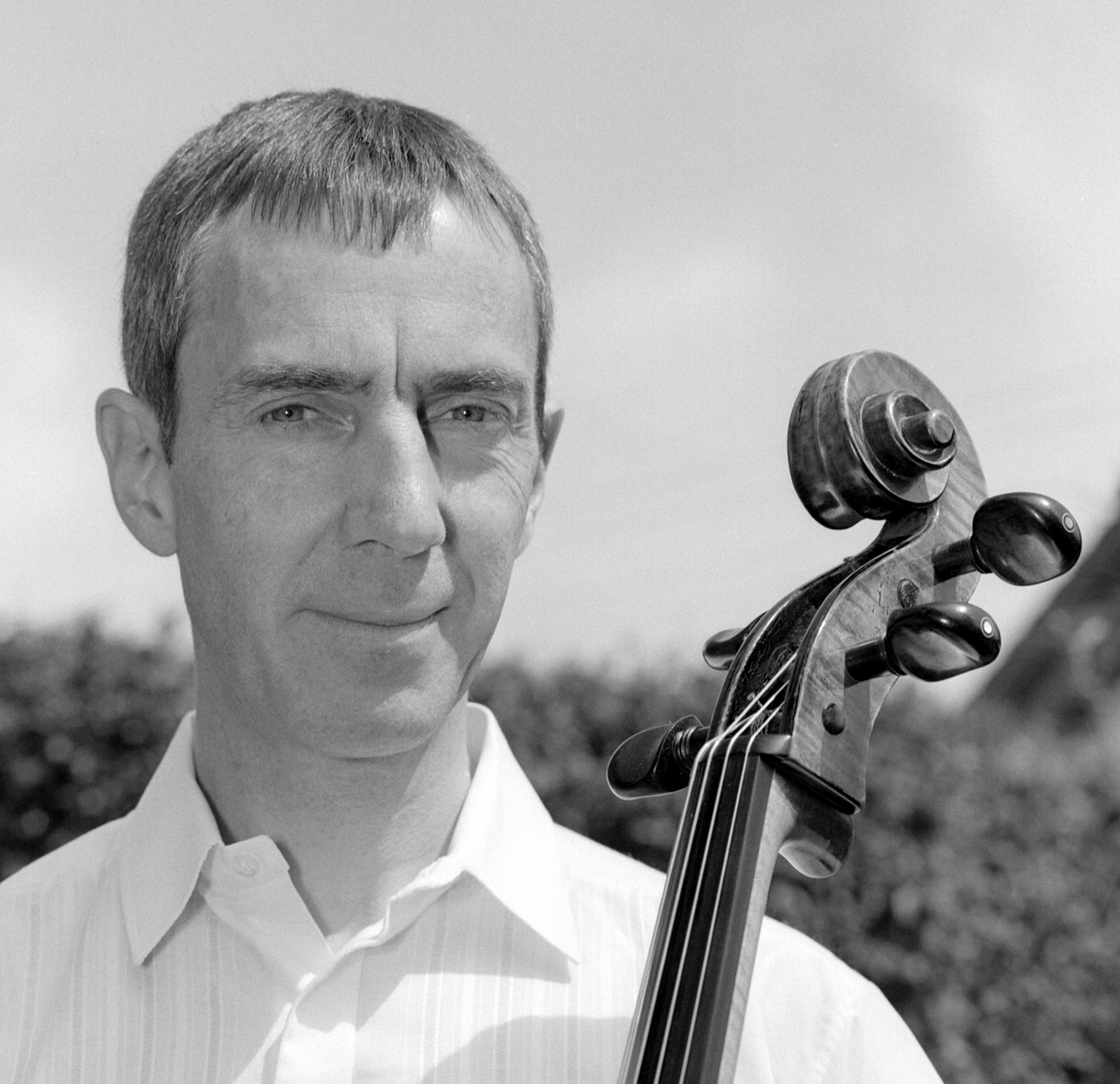
- Composer Graham Waterhouse, 2011
- Opus: 29
- Year: 1991
- Period: Contemporary
- Genre: Chamber music
- Dedication: William Waterhouse
- Published: 2000 Accolade, Holzhausen
- Duration: 12 minutes
- Scoring: Wind nonet

Mouvements d'Harmonie op. 29 is a composition in one movement for wind ensemble, written by Graham Waterhouse in 1991, dedicated to William Waterhouse. It was first performed on 24 May 1991 in the Purcell Room, London. The piece was published in 2000 by Accolade, Holzhausen. It was recorded by Endymion in 2002 on a composer portrait CD.

== History ==
Graham Waterhouse scored the work for two oboes, two clarinet, two horns, two bassoons and contra-bassoon or double bass. The title plays with the double meaning of both "mouvement" (movement and motion) and "harmonie" (harmony and wind ensemble). The composer dedicated the piece in one movement to his father, the bassoonist William Waterhouse. It was premiered in a concert on his 60th birthday on 24 May 1991 in the Purcell Room, London, by the Royal Northern College Wind Ensemble from the Royal Northern College where William Waterhouse was a professor. The first performance in the US was in 1998 as part of the convention of the International Double Reed Society at the Arizona State University in Tempe, played by ASU Harmonie Ensemble with Henry Skolnick, contrabassoon.

The piece was published in 2000 by Accolade. It was recorded in 2002 on a composer portrait CD by Endymion, conducted by Yaron Traub. Reviewer Culot noted: "Waterhouse’s father was the bassoonist William Waterhouse; the sound-world of the wind instrument holds no secret whatsoever for him." and described the work as an ABA structure in "a rather more austere idiom than the works for strings, but nevertheless quite attractive".
