= HMS Charybdis =

Six ships of the Royal Navy have been named HMS Charybdis, after the sea monster Charybdis of Greek mythology.

- The first HMS Charybdis (1809) was an 18-gun brig-sloop in use from 1809 to 1819. She apparently became the whaler Greenwich which made three complete voyages and then wrecked in the Seychelles in 1833 while on her fourth.
- The second HMS Charybdis (1831) was a 10-gun brig-sloop in use from 1831 to 1843.
- The third HMS Charybdis (1859) was a screw corvette launched in 1859, loaned to Canada from 1880 to 1882, and sold 1884.
- The fourth HMS Charybdis (1893) was an Astraea-class protected cruiser launched in 1893, converted to a cargo ship in 1918 and sold to Bermuda in 1922.
- The fifth HMS Charybdis (88) was a Dido-class cruiser launched in 1940 and sunk in the English Channel by German torpedo boats in 1943.
- The sixth HMS Charybdis (F75) was a Leander-class frigate launched in 1968 and sunk as a target in 1993.
