= Bernd Redmann =

German composer and musicologist

- Born: 10 May 1965 (age 61); Bamberg, West Germany
- Education: Hochschule für Musik und Theater München; Ludwig-Maximilians-Universität München; Hochschule für Musik und Darstellende Kunst Mannheim; Mozarteum
- Occupations: Composer; Music Theorist; Musicologist; Academic teacher.
- Organizations: Hochschule für Musik und Theater München; Hochschule für Musik Köln

Bernd Redmann (born 10 May 1965 in Bamberg) is a German composer, music theorist, and musicologist.

== Career ==
Born in Bamberg, Bernd Redmann studied at the University of Music and Theatre Munich, music pedagogy and composition with Dieter Acker, and music theory. He was also enrolled for musicology at the Ludwig-Maximilians-Universität München. He continued his studies at the Hochschule für Musik und Darstellende Kunst Mannheim, with Peter Michael Braun, among others. From 1992 he studied musicology at the Mozarteum. In 1997 he worked at the IRCAM on a scholarship of the Bavarian Ministry of Culture.

From 1993 Redmann taught at the Musikhochschule München, first accompaniment of Lied, from 1995 also music theory. In 1998/99 he taught at the Mozarteum. From 1999 to 2005 he was Professor for "Tonsatz und Improvisation" at the Hochschule für Musik Köln. In 2005 he was appointed Professor of music theory and ear training at the University of Music and Theatre Munich, where he served as president from 2014 to 2022. Since 2022 he is president of the Lübeck Academy of Music.

Redmann has been a member of the board of the Gesellschaft für Musiktheorie (Association of German-speaking Music Theory) from 2004 to 2006. He has been in the jury of the competition "Bundeswettbewerb Schulpraktisches Klavierspiel Grotrian-Steinweg" at the Hochschule für Musik "Franz Liszt", Weimar.

== Works ==
Redmann composed solo works such as Geblendete Schatten for piano, Incontro for flute, Metro for viola. His chamber music include Goldrush – Moneyrush, Verstrickung and five little obsessions. He composed works for ensemble, such as Scenario, evocación, and solo concertos, a trumpet concerto, Secret doors for two bassoons and orchestra, and Fliehende Landschaft for viola and ensemble. Orchestral works include Fiasko and 3 Pictures. He composed O and L'usine imaginaire as "Raumkompositionen" (Space compositions) for ensemble.

Fiasko was recorded in 1998, together with the Third Symphony of Anthony Iannaccone and the Symphony 1969 of Theldon Myers. Stephen Ellis reviewed:

Fiasko (translated as "total freeing") is a "chain-reaction" of "energy-laden sound materials" that, as the composer has further written, "explode outward. ... The music, freed from any obligation to be orderly, flies out of control." If one comes to the music with this in mind, knowing that the composer has scored "unpredictable music for an unpredictable world," then Fiasko is fun to listen to for its textures and sonic shapes.

In 2003 Redmann composed the music for the film Far out of Oanh Pham. His music-theatre piece Die Gehetzten (The Hurried Ones) was premiered on 19 March 2010 at the Theater Bremen. His Migrant for bassoon and string quartet was premiered in Munich on 14 March 2011, played by Lyndon Watts, Clèment Courtin, Namiko Fuse, Konstantin Sellheim and Graham Waterhouse.

== Publications ==
Redmann wrote the book Entwurf einer Theorie und Methodologie der Musikanalyse (his doctoral thesis), and essays and articles on to Beethoven, Schubert, Schenker, Riemann, the musical history of Salzburg, improvisation and orchestration.

== Awards ==
Redmanns works received awards such as in 2004 a second prize at the international competition of the Transparent Factory of Volkswagen Dresden for L'usine imaginaire.
