= Skylla and Charybdis (Waterhouse) =

Piano quartet by Graham Waterhouse

- Piano quartet by Graham Waterhouse
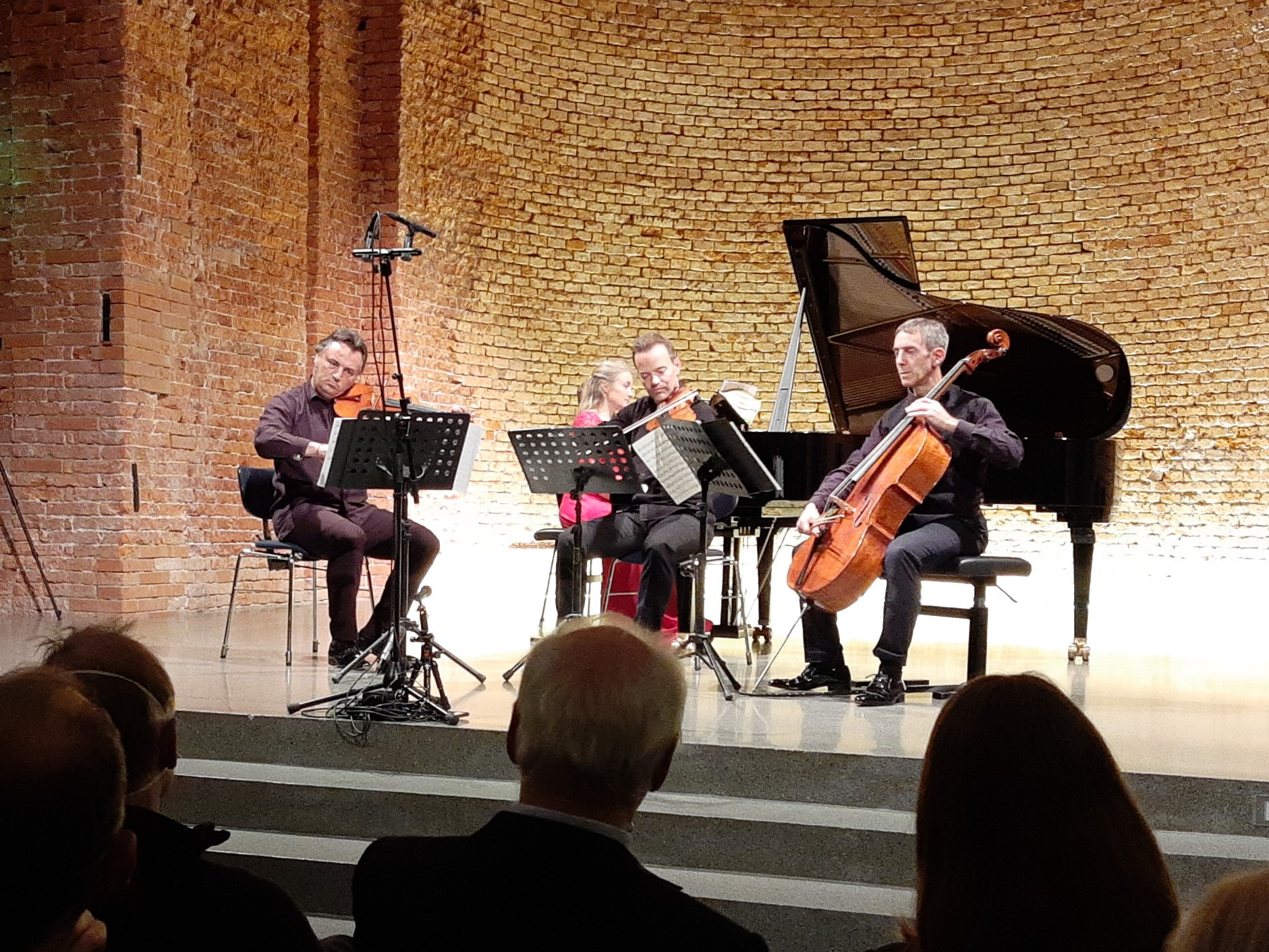
- The performers of the premiere tuning for the piece in a concert at the Allerheiligen-Hofkirche in Munich on 5 November 2022
- Year: 2014
- Period: contemporary
- Based on: Scylla and Charybdis
- Movements: 4 (without break)
- Scoring: piano, violin, viola, cello

Skylla and Charybdis is a 2014 composition for piano quartet by Graham Waterhouse, played in four movements without a break. The title refers to Scylla and Charybdis, two sea monsters from Greek mythology. In performances in German-speaking countries, it has also appeared in English surroundings as Between Scylla and Charybdis.

Skylla und Charybdis is the title of an album of music for piano and strings by Waterhouse including this piece, released by Farao Classics in 2020.

== History ==
The work, composed in 2011, was premiered at the Gasteig in Munich on 2 November 2014, by pianist Katharina Sellheim, violinist David Frühwirth, violist Konstantin Sellheim and the composer as the cellist. It was used for the title of a concert at the same location on 11 March 2018, played by the same performers, and for a concert in Gilching in preparation of an album of the same name. It was played in England in 2020, again providing the concert title, in 2020, combined with quartets by Beethoven and Dvořák, at the composer's former school, Highgate School. The quartet was notably played, by the same performers as in the premiere, as part of GW60, a concert on 5 November 2022 at the Allerheiligen-Hofkirche in Munich to celebrate the composer's 60th birthday.

== Music ==
The music is structured in four movements which are played without a break:

1. Adagio lugubre
2. Allegro demonico
3. Adagio doloroso
4. Vivace energico

According to the composer, the opening movement relates to the currents in the narrow strait of the sea. The second section pictures "threatening and aggressive characters". The third movement is based on overlapping melodies, mirroring each other as in tribal chant. The fourth section depicts a battle, musically, between the piano and the strings.

A reviewer noted in Das Orchester that the four movements, alternating slow and fast, had contrasting elements such as tender explorations of harmonic context ("sanfte Erkundungen harmonischer Kontexte") and moments full of rhythmic energy ("Momente voller rhythmischer Energie"), and imaginative sonorities ("mit großer Klangfantasie").

== Album ==
Skylla und Charybdis is the title of an album of some of the composer's works for piano and strings, including this piece. It was released in 2020 by Farao Classics. A reviewer quotes the composer explaining:

"Choosing between Scylla and Charybdis is a metaphor which means »opting for the lesser of two evils«. The composer of today steers a similarly precarious path, facing questions such as: embracing or renouncing tradition; use of tonal centres or atonality; adhering to pre-conceived musical forms or use of narrative forms; allowing one instrument to dominate, or integrating them. In my mind the vision of the perilous and deadly Scylla and Charybdis mirrors these and other dilemmas facing composers, where possible danger may lie in store for those siding too closely with one extreme or the other."

=== Track listing ===
The album contains six compositions:

1. Rhapsodie Macabre, piano and string quartet
2. Bei Nacht, Op. 50, piano trio
3. Trilogy, piano quintet
4. Bells of Beyond, piano trio
5. Kolomyjka, from Polish Suite, Op. 3, piano quartet
6. Skylla und Charybdis, piano quartet

The music, recorded in 2019 in Planegg, was performed by Katharina Sellheim (piano), David Frühwirth and Namiko Fuse (violin), Konstantin Sellheim (viola) and the composer as the cellist, which included all performers of the world premiere of Skylla und Charydis. The CD was introduced by a livestream concert at the Munich Gasteig on 6 March 2021, played by the same musicians. The program, which had been designed for the Beethoven year 2020 but was postponed due to the COVID-19 pandemic, had Kolomyjka, Skylla und Charybdis, Bells of Beyond and Rhapsodie Macabre from the album, and additionally the German premiere of Variations for Cello Solo, and the world premiere of 11 Neue Bagatellen nach Op. 119, arrangements of the Eleven Bagatelles by Beethoven, originally for piano, for string quartet.
