= Razumovsky Ensemble =

The Razumovsky Ensemble founded by the award-winning Ukrainian cellist, Oleg Kogan, is a chamber ensemble that features prominent international players, some of whom are soloists, others of whom are orchestral principals. The ensemble has been successful and developed a strong following, playing regularly at the Wigmore Hall and at festivals abroad.

== Academy ==
It has now formed the Razumovsky Academy in which the members of the ensemble as well as world-class soloists invited to give masterclasses train outstanding students from all over the world to become the next generation of instrumental soloists. The young academy players now give their own concerts at the Wigmore Hall as well as going out into schools to inspire pupils to study classical music.

== Notes ==
- Jessica Duchen, Razumovsky Ensemble, Wigmore Hall, London, The Independent, 5 July 2005
- Bayan Northcott, Razumovsky Ensemble, Wigmore Hall, London, The Independent, 2 May 2007
