= British Double Reed Society =

The British Double Reed Society (BDRS) is a society for players of double reed instruments in the United Kingdom and around the world. It was founded in 1988 to "promote and enhance the interests of all double reed players, whether students, amateurs, professionals or teachers". Primarily, the Society's members are British players of the oboe and bassoon. Some specialise in the cor anglais, contrabassoon or French bassoon.

== History ==
The Society was originally established by George Caird, William Waterhouse and others to host the International Double Reed Society convention at the Royal Northern College of Music in Manchester in 1989 and has since flourished as a society in its own right.

The current chair of the Society is James Turnbull and the joint presidents are Roger Birnstingl and Nicholas Daniel.

The BDRS is a registered charity.

== Activities ==
The Society offers a wide range of services as well as providing a forum for the interchange of expertise, knowledge and opinion on all matters relating to double reed instruments.

- Publication of quarterly magazine Double Reed News
- Annual convention, featuring recitals, masterclasses, workshops, seminars, reed-making and trade stands
- Regional conventions, providing members with the benefits of the annual convention in more remote parts of the country
