= Konstantin Sellheim =

German violist

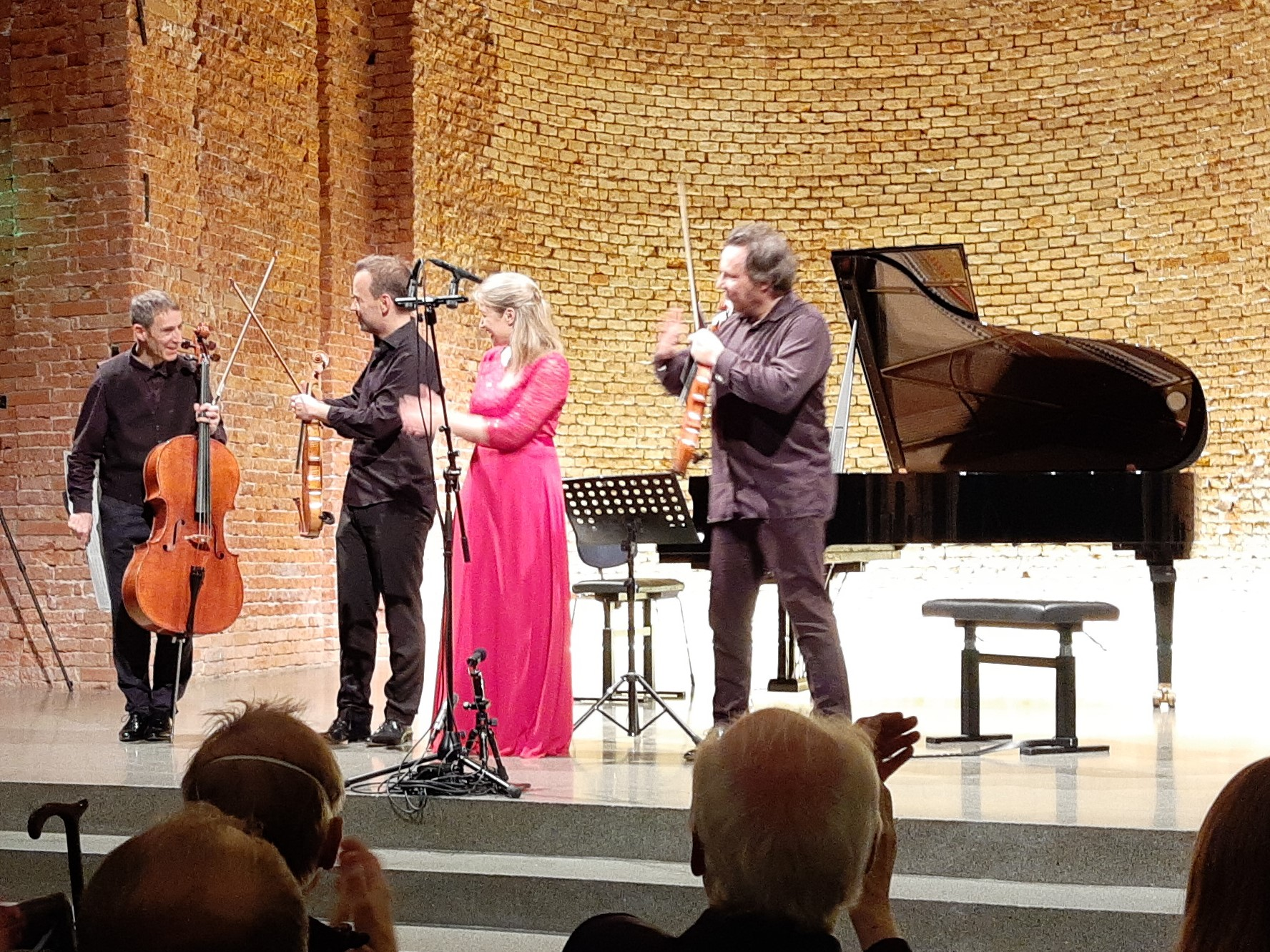
- Sellheim after a performance of Skylla und Charybdis by Graham Waterhouse at the Allerheiligen-Hofkirche in Munich on 5 November 2022, with the composer as the cellist (l.), his sister Katharina Sellheim as the pianist and violinist David Frühwirth (r.)
- Born: 1978 (age 46–47)
- Education: Hochschule für Musik und Theater Hannover; Universität der Künste Berlin
- Occupations: Violist; Academic
- Organizations: Staatskapelle Berlin; Münchner Philharmoniker; Universität der Künste Berlin
- Awards: International Johannes Brahms Competition; International Max Rostal Competition

Konstantin Sellheim (born 1978) is a German classical violist, who has appeared internationally with a focus on chamber music. He is a violist of the Münchner Philharmoniker, and lecturer of viola at the Universität der Künste Berlin.

== Career ==
Sellheim began to play violin at age six. He studied violin at the Hochschule für Musik und Theater Hannover. He then studied viola, from 1996 with Volker Worlitzsch of the NDR Radiophilharmonie, from 1999 with Hartmut Rohde at the Universität der Künste Berlin, from 2004 with Nobuko Imai in Amsterdam, and with Wilfried Strehle of the Berliner Philharmoniker. He was from 2004 violist with the Staatskapelle Berlin conducted by Daniel Barenboim, and from 2006 violist of the Münchner Philharmoniker.

He has played with his sister, the pianist Katharina Sellheim, as the Duo Sellheim. They recorded a CD, Fantasy, of works by Robert Schumann, Paul Hindemith and Rebecca Clarke. With the clarinetist László Kuti, they have performed as the Sellheim-Kuti-Trio. The trio recorded a CD, Märchenerzählungen (Fairy tales), including Mozart's Kegelstatt Trio, K. 498, Schumann's Märchenerzählungen, Op. 132, György Kurtág's Hommage a R. Sch., Op. 15d, Prokofiev's Overture on Hebrew Themes, Op. 34, and Greetings from the Balkan by Béla Kovács. Sellheim also played chamber music with Giora Feidman, Igor Levit and Michael Schade, among others.

Sellheim created new music, playing for example in 2014 in a concert at the Gasteig in Munich the premiere of the piano quartet Skylla and Charybdis by Graham Waterhouse, along with the composer's Sonata ebraica and Beethoven's Piano Quartet in C major, WoO 36/3, with his sister, the violinist David Frühwirth and the composer.

He has been lecturer of viola at the Universität der Künste Berlin in Rohde's class.

Sellheim received prizes at international competitions including the International Johannes Brahms Competition in Pörtschach in 2002 and the International Max Rostal Competition in Berlin in 2004.
