= Roger Birnstingl =

British classical bassoonist

Roger Birnstingl is a British classical bassoonist. He started playing the bassoon at age 14, Educated at Bedales School and later studied with Archie Camden at the Royal College of Music in London. He has served as principal bassoonist of the London Philharmonic (1956–1958), the Royal Philharmonic (1961–1964) and the London Symphony Orchestra (1964–1977). He later served as principal bassoonist with the Orchestre de la Suisse Romande until his retirement in 1997. He is currently professor of bassoon at the Geneva Conservatoire, where his students have included Carlo Colombo, principal bassoonist of the Lyon Opera Orchestra; and Kim Walker. He is also a joint president of the British Double Reed Society.

== Recordings ==
- An English Serenade (SCSH 022, SanCtuS Recordings)
