= Dieter Acker =

German composer

Dieter Acker (3 November 1940 – 27 May 2006) was a German composer born in Sibiu, Romania.

== Career ==
Dieter Acker studied composition with Sigismund Toduță. In 1969, Acker moved from Transylvania (Romania) to Germany for political and artistic reasons. He later attended the Munich conservatory where in 1976 he received a professorship in composition. Acker taught a number of students that later became prominent composers, such as Wolfram Buchenberg, Ferran Cruixent, Oriol Cruixent, Marius Ruhlan, Florian Heigenhauser, Peter Wittrich and others. In 2000, the University of Cluj-Napoca awarded him an honorary doctorate. Dieter Acker wrote well over a hundred works, including orchestral compositions, six symphonies, instrumental concertos, and chamber music. He died in Munich, Germany in 2006.

== Selected works ==
Concertante

- Musik for viola, harp and string orchestra (1992)

Chamber music

- Cantus duriusculus for brass quintet (1973)
- Duo for viola and cello (1973)
- Sonata for viola and piano (1985)
- Equale II for 2 violas (1987)
- Sonata for viola and harp (1987)
- Trio for flute, viola and harp (or guitar) (1987)
- Trio for clarinet, viola and piano (1992)
- Arkaden II for viola and piano (1995)
