= Friedrich Hofmeister Musikverlag =

Publisher of classical music, founded by Friedrich Hofmeister in Leipzig in 1807

- Founded: 1807
- Founder: Friedrich Hofmeister
- Country of origin: Germany
- Headquarters location: Leipzig
- Publication types: sheet music
- Official website: www.hofmeister-musikverlag.com

Friedrich Hofmeister Musikverlag (abbreviated to Hofmeister) is a publisher of classical music, founded by Friedrich Hofmeister in Leipzig in 1807. Early listings included composers Ludwig van Beethoven, Frédéric Chopin and Franz Liszt. Hofmeister was the first to publish Mahler's Second Symphony. Pedagogical works, such as a Violinenschule of Hubert Ries (1841), are still in use. The company sells sheet music internationally, including Asia and America.

== History ==
Friedrich Hofmeister, born in 1787, first founded a music store in Leipzig in April 1807. Early listings include composers Ludwig van Beethoven, Luigi Cherubini, Franz Anton Hoffmeister, Carl Maria von Weber, Johann Nepomuk Hummel, John Field and Franz Liszt.

In the early years, he published a balance of music by popular composers, pedagogical material, and young composers such as Robert Schumann, Chopin, Clara Wieck-Schumann and Hector Berlioz. Pedagogical volumes included a Gitarrenschule (guitar) by Johann Traugott Lehmann (1811); the Violinenschule (violin) of Hubert Ries (1841) is still in use, and several volumes of etudes published in the 19th century.

Hofmeister's early publishing practices sometimes brought him into conflict with composers. In 1833 Berlioz objected to publication by Hofmeister of an unauthorized four-handed piano version of his Franc-Juges overture, saying "your arranger has butchered my score, clipped its wings, ... and sewn it back up again such that I find a ridiculous monster..." Although Hofmeister maintained friendly as well as professional relations with Liszt for many years, in 1839 his company published a pirated edition of twelve études by Liszt, which led to later disputes with the composer.

After 1847, control of the company largely devolved onto Hofmeister's two sons, Adolph Moritz Hofmeister and Wilhelm Hofmeister.

Hofmeister was one of four major publishers to disseminate the music of Gustav Mahler and the first to publish Mahler's Second Symphony. Hofmeister also published several songs in the early 20th century by composer Eugen Haile.

In the twentieth century, the company had various owners until its appropriation by East Germany after World War II. It remains in operation today, with branches in Frankfurt and Leipzig.

The company supports projects of regional importance, such as "Edition Denkmäler Mitteldeutscher Barockmusik". The collection of works by composers from Saxony, Thuringia and Saxony-Anhalt started with a Passion cantata as a pasticcio of Altnickol, J. S. Bach, Graun, Kuhnau and Telemann in 1997, and includes Gottfried Heinrich Stölzel's Christmas cantatas (2007) and the Bockes-Passion (2011).

Hofmeister kept the tradition of the publishing the works of new composers, including Harald Banter, Vytautas Barkauskas, Árni Egilsson, Elisenda Fábregas, Christoph Förster, Bernd Franke, Patrick Hagen, Timo Jouko Herrmann, Walter Thomas Heyn, René Hirschfeld, Stephan König, Ralf Kubicek, Claus Kühnl, Martin Kürschner, Rainer Lischka, Rafael Lukjanik, Peter Mai, Cecilia McDowall, Kelly-Marie Murphy, Gisbert Näther, Loretta K. Notareschi, Lorenzo Palomo, Hannes Pohlit, Kateřina Růžičková, Stefan Schäfer, Kurt Schwaen, Siegfried Thiele, Karl Ottomar Treibmann, Siegfried Tiefensee, Graham Waterhouse, and Elsa Laura Wolzogen.

== Literature ==
- Anita Punkt: Der Friedrich Hofmeister Musikverlag. Sein Profil in Geschichte und Gegenwart. dissertation.de, Berlin 2007, ISBN 978-3-86624-304-0 (Dissertation.de 1404)
