= International Double Reed Society =

Musical society

The International Double Reed Society (IDRS), is an organization that promotes the interests of double reed players, instrument manufacturers and enthusiasts. Services provided by the IDRS include an international oboe and bassoon competition, an annual conference, a member directory, a library, information about grants, and publications, such as the society's own journal, The Double Reed.

The IDRS Fernand Gillet-Hugo Fox International Competition for oboists and bassoonists takes place every year during the society's annual conference.

== History ==
The IDRS grew out of a 1969 newsletter for bassoonists compiled by Gerald Corey. Professor Lewis Hugh Cooper at the University of Michigan and Alan Fox, president of bassoon manufacturer Fox Products, founded a “double reed club” to promote opportunities for double reed players. Together with Corey, they organized a meeting during the December 1971 meeting of the Mid-Western Band Masters convention, and the first annual conference of the double reed society assembled in August 1972 at the University of Michigan.

The IDRS has been affectionately nicknamed the "International Double Nerd Society", likely because the oboe is particularly difficult and awkward to play, per IDRS administrative director Frank Swann.
