= Drebbel =

Drebbel may refer to:

- Cornelis Drebbel (1572–1633), Dutch scientist and inventor of the first navigable submarine
- Drebbel (crater), a lunar impact crater
