= Szydło =

Szydło is a Polish surname. It is a metonymic occupational name referring to shoemaker's tool: in Polish szydło means "awl". Notable people with this surname include:

- Andrew Szydlo (born 1949), British chemist
- Beata Szydło (born 1963), Polish politician
