= Drebbel (crater) =

Lunar surface depression

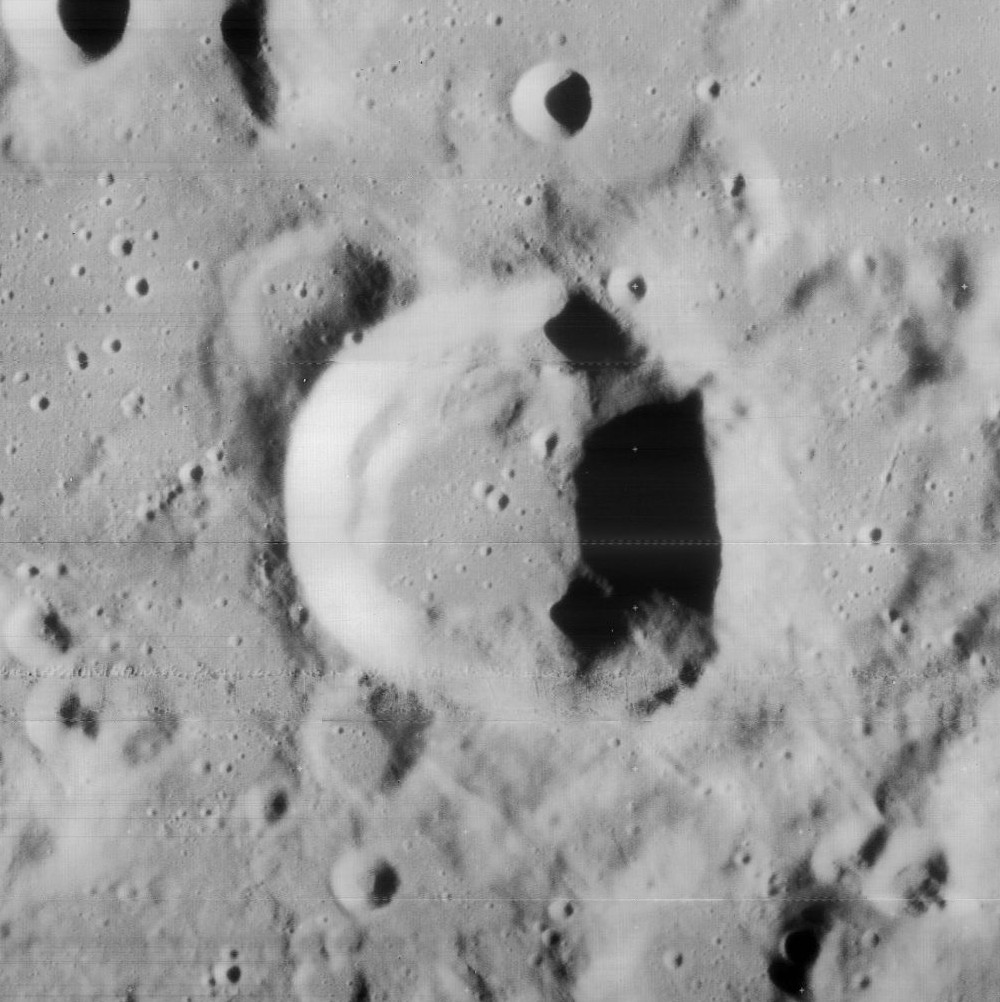
- Lunar Orbiter 4 image
- Coordinates: 40.9°S 49.0°W
- Diameter: 30.23 km (18.78 mi)
- Depth: 2.5 km (1.6 mi)
- Colongitude: 49° at sunrise
- Eponym: Cornelius Drebbel

Drebbel is a small lunar impact crater that is located to the northeast of the large walled plain designated Schickard, in the southwestern part of the Moon. Further to the northeast is the Lacus Excellentiae and the small crater Clausius.

The rim of this crater is roughly circular, with an outward bulge along the east and southeast side. Along this arc of the inner wall is a single terrace where the material has slumped downwards. The west and northwest sides have accumulations along the base where loose material has slumped to the floor. The remainder of the inner rim is a simple slope that runs down to the interior floor. The rim is relatively sharp-edged and not significantly worn. There is a level interior floor that is just over half the crater diameter.

This formation is named after the Dutch inventor Cornelius Drebbel (1572-1634). His name was included with the lunar nomenclature of Johann Heinrich von Mädler in the 19th century. Its designation was officially adopted by the International Astronomical Union in 1935.

== Satellite craters ==
By convention these features are identified on lunar maps by placing the letter on the side of the crater midpoint that is closest to Drebbel.

Drebbel	Latitude	Longitude	Diameter
A	38.9° S	51.0° W	7 km
B	37.8° S	47.3° W	18 km
C	40.4° S	42.9° W	30 km
D	37.9° S	49.3° W	10 km
E	38.1° S	51.3° W	65 km
F	42.7° S	44.6° W	15 km
G	43.9° S	45.2° W	17 km
H	41.7° S	45.3° W	10 km
J	40.6° S	52.3° W	13 km
K	40.0° S	49.5° W	37 km
L	40.3° S	50.8° W	9 km
M	41.2° S	41.4° W	8 km
N	41.3° S	52.4° W	9 km
P	39.7° S	51.8° W	4 km

There are dark patches on the floor of Drebbel E and in the vicinity of Drebbel B.
