= Schickard (crater) =

Lunar impact crater

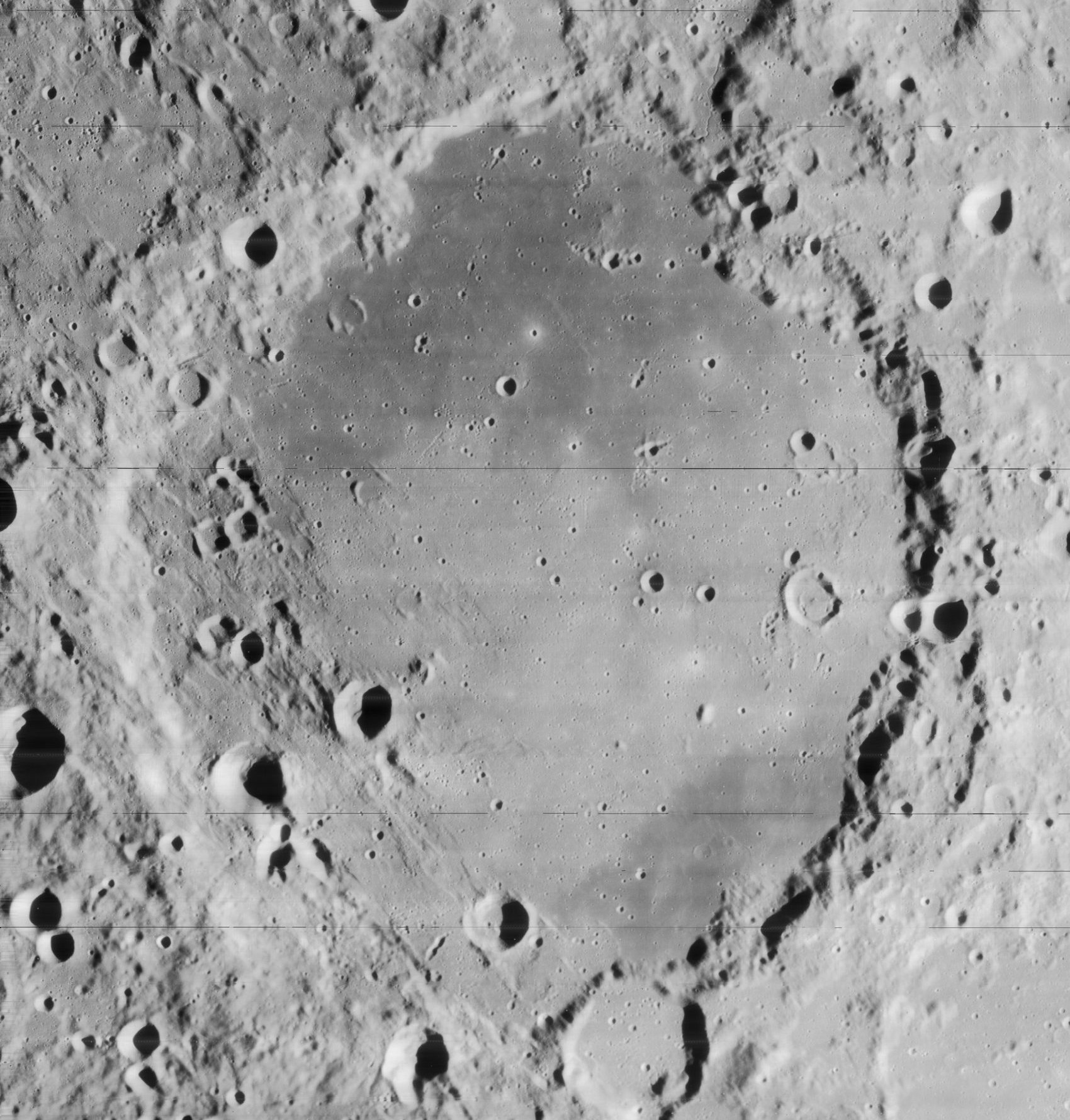
- Lunar Orbiter 4 image
- Coordinates: 44.4°S 55.1°W
- Diameter: 212 km
- Depth: 1.5 km
- Colongitude: 55° at sunrise
- Formation: Pre-Nectarian
- Eponym: Wilhelm Schickard

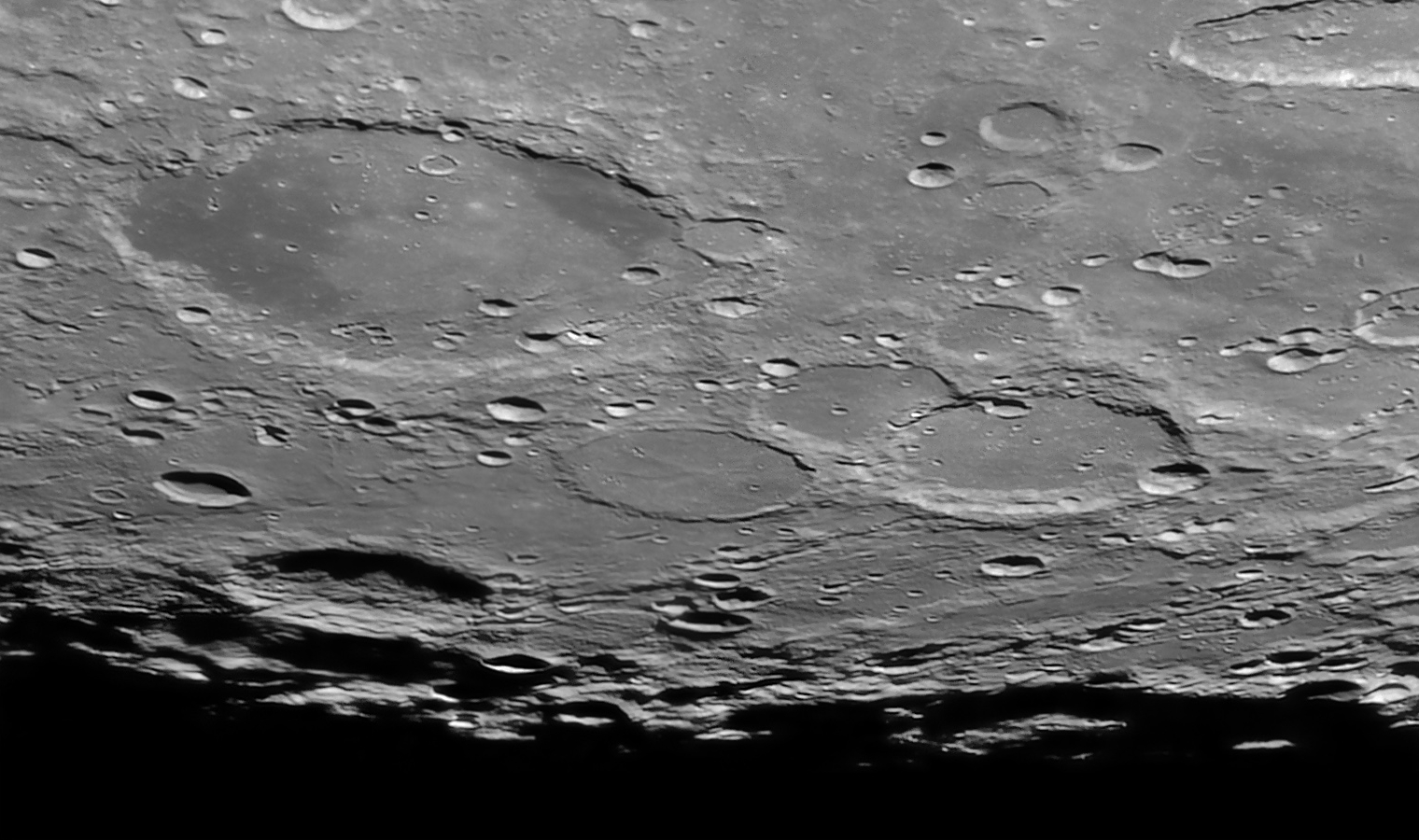
Earth-based view with Schickard in upper left. Nasmyth, Phocylides, and Wargentin are at right.

Schickard is a lunar impact crater of the form called a walled plain. It lies in the southwest sector of the Moon, near the lunar limb. As a result, the crater appears oblong due to foreshortening. T. W. Webb called this crater "an enormous plain" that "is encircled by a complex wall"; "the interior is nearly level, but its colour strongly varied". Attached to the northern rim is the lesser crater Lehmann, and to the northeast is the even smaller Drebbel. Southwest of Schickard is Wargentin, a lava-flooded plateau.

This impact event dates to the Pre-Nectarian period of the lunar geologic timescale. Schickard has a worn rim that is overlain in several locations by smaller impact craters. The most prominent of these is the irregular Schickard E across the southeastern rim. The floor of Schickard has been partially flooded by lava, leaving only the southwest portion uncovered and rough-textured.

Schickard's floor is marked with a triangular band of lighter-albedo material, leaving relatively darker patches in the north and southeast. This feature is more prominent when the Sun is at a relatively high angle. There are also multiple small crater impacts on the floor, most notably in the southwest.

== Satellite craters ==
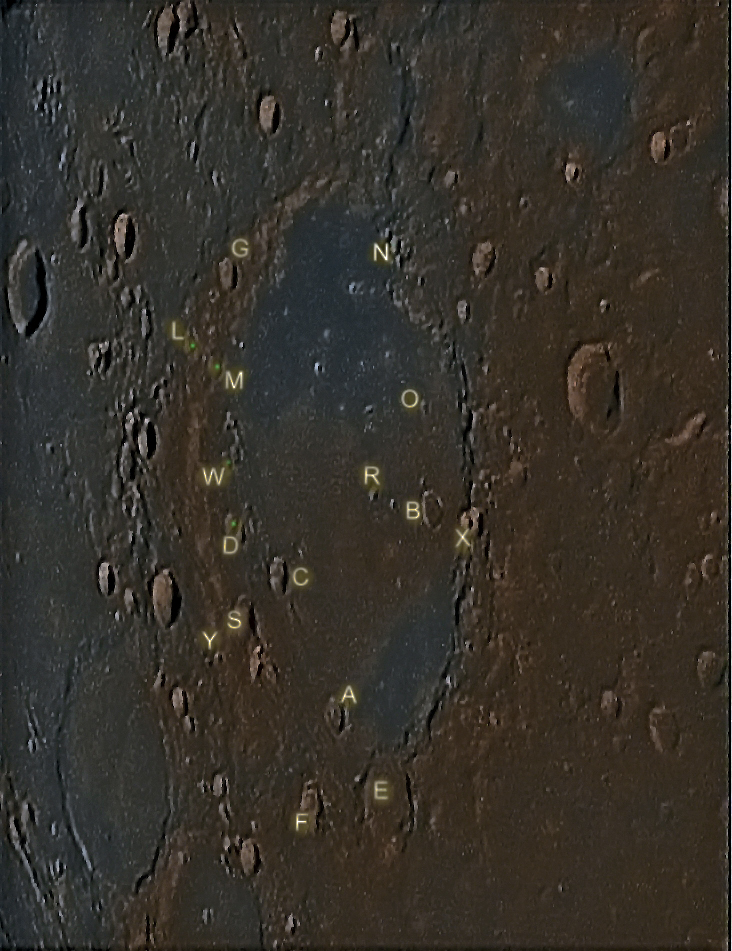
Satellite craters

By convention these features are identified on lunar maps by placing the letter on the side of the crater midpoint that is closest to Schickard.

Schickard	Coordinates	Diameter, km
A	46.87°S 53.71°W	14
B	43.74°S 52.25°W	14
C	45.86°S 56.00°W	13
D	45.77°S 57.72°W	9
E	47.28°S 51.67°W	33
F	48.00°S 53.86°W	14
G	43.04°S 58.98°W	12
H	43.52°S 62.34°W	16
J	45.01°S 62.44°W	13
K	43.86°S 63.90°W	14
L	44.12°S 59.80°W	9
M	44.19°S 58.98°W	9
N	41.30°S 54.69°W	7
P	42.91°S 48.50°W	94
Q	42.74°S 53.05°W	6
R	44.13°S 53.82°W	5
S	46.66°S 56.80°W	16
T	44.81°S 50.37°W	5
W	45.12°S 58.19°W	8
X	43.55°S 51.26°W	8
Y	47.44°S 57.60°W	5
