= Cornelis Drebbel =

Dutch engineer and inventor (1572–1633)

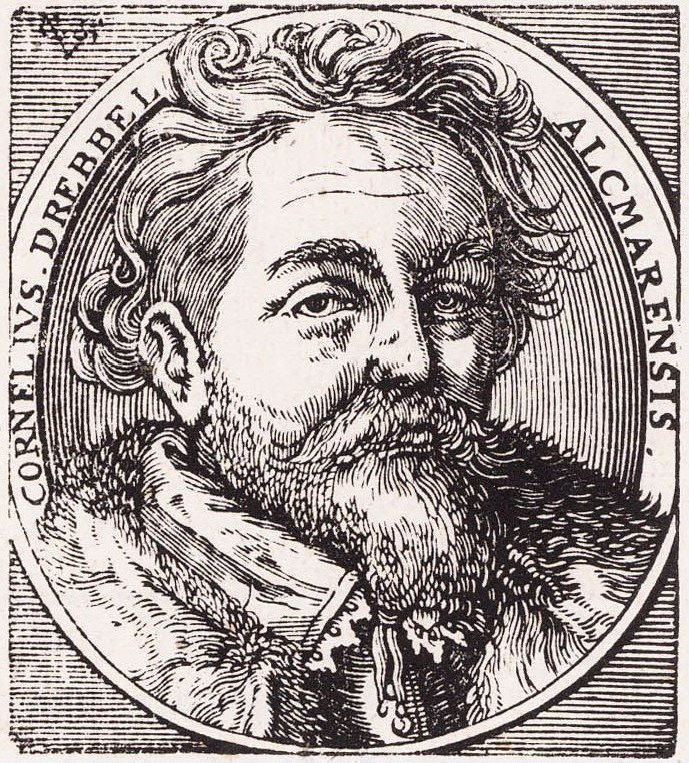
- Portrait of Drebbel, c. 1631
- Born: 1572; Alkmaar, Habsburg Netherlands, Holy Roman Empire
- Died: 7 November 1633 (aged 60–61); London, Kingdom of England
- Education: Hendrick Goltzius
- Occupations: Engineer, inventor
- Spouse: Sophia Jansdochter Goltzius (m. 1595)
- Children: 6

Cornelis Jacobszoon Drebbel (Dutch pronunciation: [kɔrˈneːlɪ ˈɕaːkɔpsoːn ˈdrɛbəl]; (Note: In isolation, Jacobszoon is pronounced [ˈjaːkɔpsoːn].) 1572 – 7 November 1633) was a Dutch engineer and inventor. He was the builder of the first operational submarine in 1620 and an innovator who contributed to the development of measurement and control systems, optics and chemistry.

== Biography ==
Cornelis Drebbel was born in Alkmaar, Holland in an Anabaptist family in 1572. After some years at the Latin school in Alkmaar, around 1587, he attended the Academy in Haarlem, also located in North-Holland. Teachers at the Academy were Hendrik Goltzius, engraver, painter, alchemist and humanist, Karel van Mander, painter, writer, humanist and Cornelis Corneliszoon of Haarlem. Drebbel became a skilled engraver on copperplate and also took an interest in alchemy.

In 1595 he married Sophia Jansdochter Goltzius, younger sister of Hendrick, and settled at Alkmaar. They had at least six children, of whom four survived. Drebbel worked initially as a painter, engraver and cartographer. But he was in constant need of money because of the profligate lifestyle of his wife. In 1598 he obtained a patent for a water-supply system and a sort of perpetual clockwork. In 1600, Drebbel was in Middelburg where he built a fountain at the Noorderpoort. In that spectacle-making center he may have picked up knowledge in the art of lens grinding and later would construct a magic lantern and a camera obscura.

Around 1604 the Drebbel family moved to England, probably at the invitation of the new king, James I of England (VI of Scotland). He was accommodated at Eltham Palace. Drebbel worked there at the masques, that were performed by and for the court. He was attached to the court of young Renaissance crown-prince, Henry. He astonished the court with a demonstration of a perpetual motion machine, automatic and hydraulic organs and his optical Instruments.

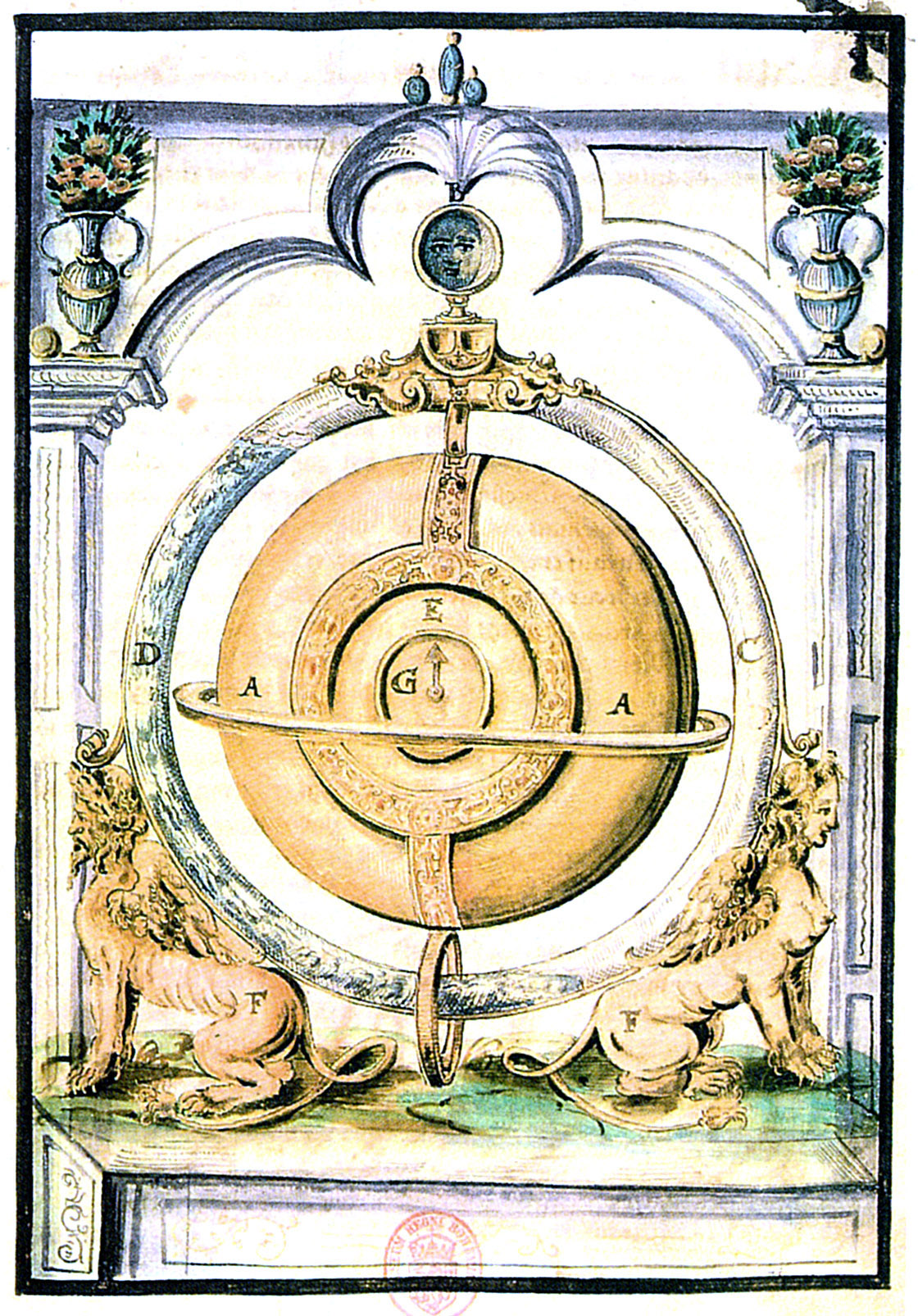
"Perpetuum mobile" clock by Drebbel

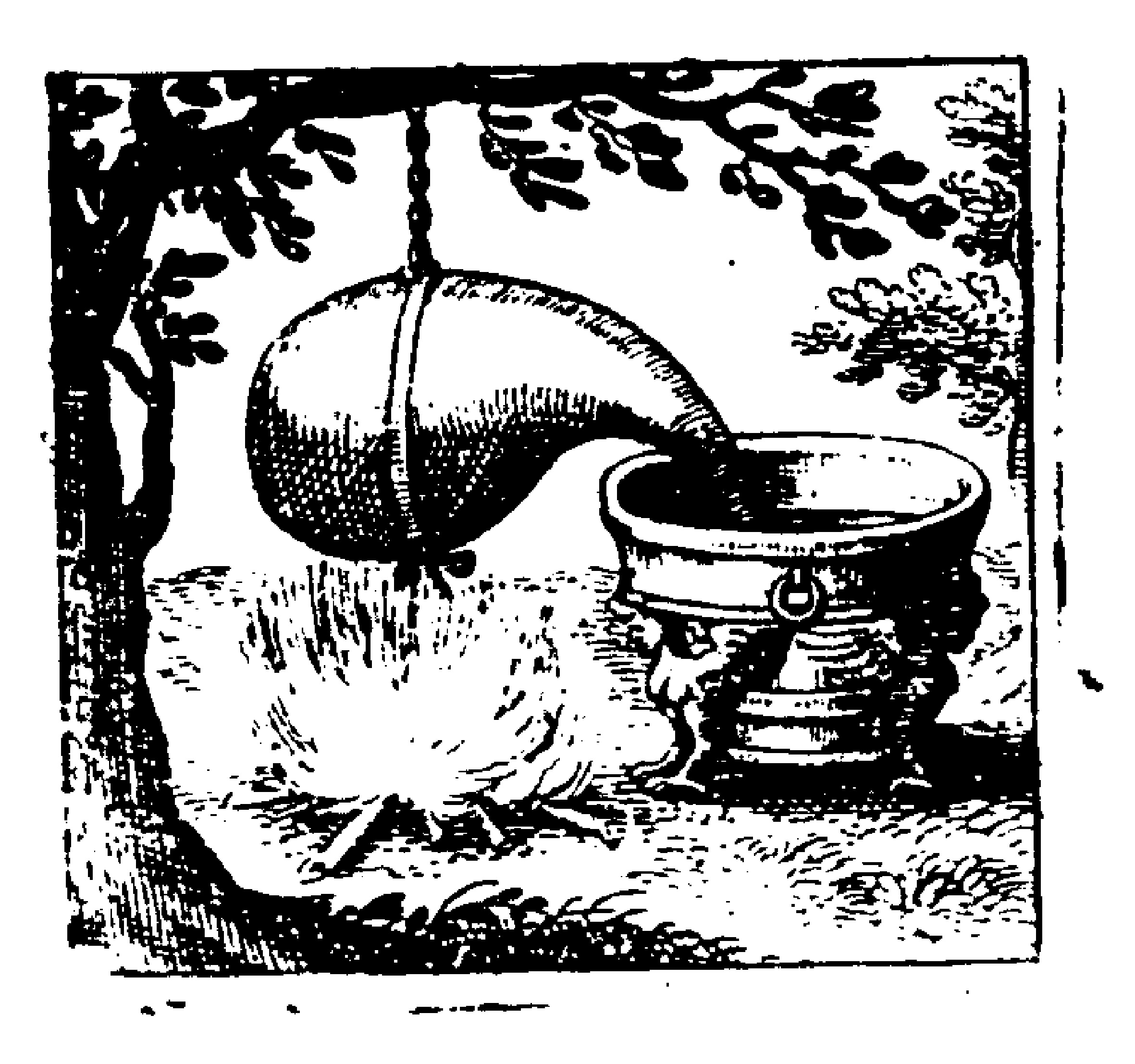

His fame went through the courts of Europe. In October 1610 Drebbel and his family moved to Prague on invitation of Roman-German Emperor Rudolf II, who was preoccupied with the arts, alchemy and occult sciences. Here again Drebbel demonstrated his inventions. When in 1611 Rudolf II was stripped of all effective power by his younger brother Archduke Matthias, Drebbel was imprisoned for about a year. After Rudolf's death in 1612, Drebbel was set free and went back to London in 1613. Unfortunately his patron prince Henry had also died and Drebbel was in financial trouble. With his glass-grinding machine he manufactured optical instruments and compound microscopes with two convex lenses, for which there was a constant demand.

At the request of Roman-German Emperor Ferdinand II in 1619, he went to Prague again to tutor his sons and was taken prisoner after the Battle of White Mountain and the capture of Prague in 1620, where he also lost his fortune. In 1622 Constantijn Huygens stayed as a diplomat for more than one year in England. It is quite possible that he learned the art of glass grinding at this time from Drebbel, and that he passed this knowledge to his second son Christiaan Huygens, who became a prominent Dutch mathematician and scientist. The English natural philosopher Robert Hooke may have learned the art of glass grinding from his acquaintance Johannes Sibertus Kuffler, the son-in-law of Drebbel.

Towards the end of his life, in 1633, Drebbel was involved in a plan to drain the Fens around Cambridge, while living in near-poverty running an ale house in England. He died in London.

In keeping with traditional Mennonite practice, Drebbel's estate was split between his four living children at the time of his death.

== Works ==
Drebbel was an empirical researcher and innovator. His constructions and innovations cover measurement and control technology, pneumatics, optics, chemistry, hydraulics and pyrotechnics. He registered several patents with the Dutch "Staten Generaal". He also wrote essays about his experiments with air pressure and made beautiful engravings; including The Seven Liberal Arts on a map of the city of Alkmaar. He was involved in making theater props, moving statues and in plans to build a new theater in London. He worked on producing torpedoes, naval mines, detonators that used glass Batavian tears, and worked on fulminating gold (aurum fulminans) as an explosive.

He was known for his Perpetuum Mobile, built an incubator for eggs and a portable stove/oven with an optimal use of fuel, able to keep the heat on a constant temperature by means of a regulator/thermostat. He designed a solar energy system for London (perpetual fire), demonstrated air-conditioning, made lightning and thunder ‘on command’, and developed fountains and a fresh water supply for the city of Middelburg. He was involved in the draining of the moors around Cambridge (the Fens), developed predecessors of the barometer and thermometer, and harpsichords that played on solar energy.

=== Chemistry ===
Drebbel's most famous written work was Een kort Tractaet van de Natuere der Elementen (A short treatise of the nature of the elements) (Haarlem, 1621). He was also involved in the invention of mercury fulminate. He also discovered that mixtures of “spiritus vini” with mercury and silver in “aqua fortis” could explode.

Drebbel invented a chicken incubator and a mercury thermostat which automatically kept it stable at a constant temperature; one of the first recorded feedback-controlled devices. He also developed and demonstrated a working air conditioning system. The invention of a working thermometer is also credited to Drebbel.

==== Scarlet dye ====
The story goes that, while making a coloured liquid for a thermometer Cornelis dropped a flask of aqua regia on a tin window sill, and discovered that stannous chloride makes the colour of carmine much brighter and more durable. Although Cornelis did not make much money from his work, his daughters Anna and Catharina and his sons-in-law Abraham and Johannes Sibertus Kuffler set up a very successful dye works. One was set up in 1643 in Bow, London, and the resulting colour was called bow dye. The recipe for "colour Kufflerianus" was kept a family secret, and the new bright red colour was very popular in Europe.

=== Optics ===
Drebbel is credited with developing an automatic precision lens-grinding machine, improved telescopes, the first compound microscope ('lunette de Dreubells'), camera obscura, laterna magica, and Dutch or Batavian tears.

==== Compound microscope ====
One of the optical devices some historians believe Drebbel invented when he was working for the Duke of Buckingham was the compound microscope. The device appeared in Europe around 1620 with the earliest account being Dutch Ambassador Willem Boreel's 1619 visit to London where he saw a compound microscope in Drebbel's possession, described as an instrument about eighteen inches long, two inches in diameter, and supported on 3 brass dolphins. In 1621 Drebbel had a compound microscope with two convex lenses. Several of his contemporaries, including Christiaan Huygens, credited the invention of the compound microscope to Drebbel. The invention has many counter claims including Dutch spectacle-maker Johannes Zachariassen's claim that Drebbel stole the idea from him and his father, Zacharias Jansen, and claims that Galileo Galilei used his telescope after 1610 as a type of compound microscope. In 1624 Galileo saw Drebbel's design for a microscope in Rome and created an improved version of it to send to Federico Cesi, founder of the Accademia dei Lincei, who used it to illustrate Apiarum, his book about bees.

=== Submarine ===
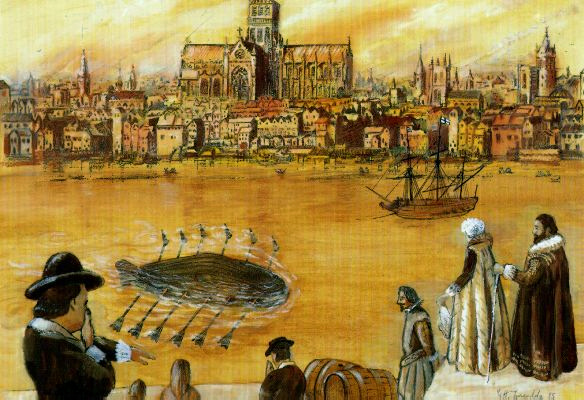
First navigable submarine

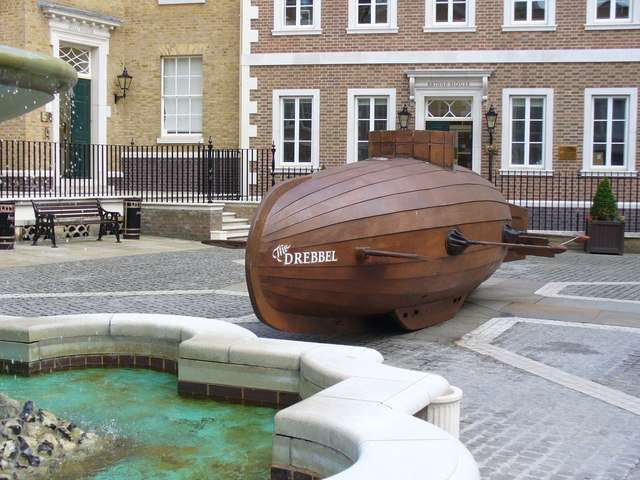
Reconstruction of the Drebbel, Richmond upon Thames. In 2002, the British boatbuilder Mark Edwards built a wooden submarine based on the original version by Drebbel. It was shown in the BBC TV programme Building the Impossible in 2002.

He also built the first navigable submarine in 1620 while working for the English Royal Navy. He manufactured a steerable submarine with a leather-covered wooden frame. Between 1620 and 1624 Drebbel successfully built and tested two more submarines, each one bigger than the last. The final (third) model had 6 oars and could carry 16 passengers. This model was demonstrated to King James I in person and several thousand Londoners. The submarine stayed submerged for three hours and could travel from Westminster to Greenwich and back, cruising at a depth between 12 and 15 feet (4 to 5 metres). Drebbel even took King James in this submarine on a test dive beneath the Thames, making King James I the first monarch to travel underwater. This submarine was tested many times in the Thames, but it failed to attract enough enthusiasm from the Admiralty and was never used in combat.

== Cultural references ==
Cornelis Drebbel has been honoured on postage stamps issued by the postal services of both Mali and the Netherlands in 2010.

A portrayal of Cornelis Drebbel and his submarine can be briefly seen in the film The Four Musketeers (1974). A small leatherclad submersible surfaces off the coast of England, and the top opens clamshell-wise revealing Cornelis Drebbel and the Duke of Buckingham.

Drebbel was honoured in an episode of the cartoon Sealab 2021 during a submarine rescue of workers on a research station in the Arctic. A German U-boat captain fired a pistol in celebration at the mention of Drebbel, to shouts of, "Sieg Heil! Cornelis Drebbel!" Also, on the Sealab 2021 Season 3 DVD, Cornelis Drebbel has two DVD commentaries devoted to the story of his life.

In the Dutch Eighty Years' War comic Gilles de Geus, Drebbel is a supporting character to the warhero Gilles. He is drawn as a crazy inventor, similar to Q in the James Bond series. His submarine plays a role in the comic.

Richard SantaColoma has speculated that the Voynich Manuscript may be connected to Drebbel, initially suggesting it was Drebbel's cipher notebook on microscopy and alchemy, and then later hypothesising it is a fictional "tie in" to Francis Bacon's utopian novel New Atlantis in which some Drebbel-related items (submarine, perpetual clock) are said to appear.

== Namesake ==
A small lunar crater has been named after him. Several Dutch towns have a street named after him. "Cornelis Drebbelweg" in Delft is one of them.

== Sources ==
- BBC bio
- Andrew Szydlo, Water that does not wet hands, (Polish Academy of Sciences, 1994)
- Brett McLaughlin, Cornelis Drebbel and the First Submarine (1997)
- L.E. Harris, The Two Netherlanders, Humphrey Bradley and Cornelis Drebbel (Cambridge, 1961)
- Jaeger, Francis Maurits (1922). Cornelis Drebbel en zijne tijdgenooten (in Dutch). Groningen: P. Noordhoff.
- Shmaefsky, Brian R. (October 30, 2006). Biotechnology 101. Bloomsbury Publishing USA. ISBN 978-1-56750-997-7.
- Tierie, Gerrit (1932). "Cornelis Drebbel (1572-1633)" (PDF). Amsterdam: H. J. Paris.
- Van Helden, Albert; Dupré, Sven; van Gent, Rob (2010). The Origins of the Telescope. Amsterdam University Press. ISBN 978-90-6984-615-6.
- Who was Cornelis J. Drebbel ?
