= Phocylides (crater) =

Lunar surface depression

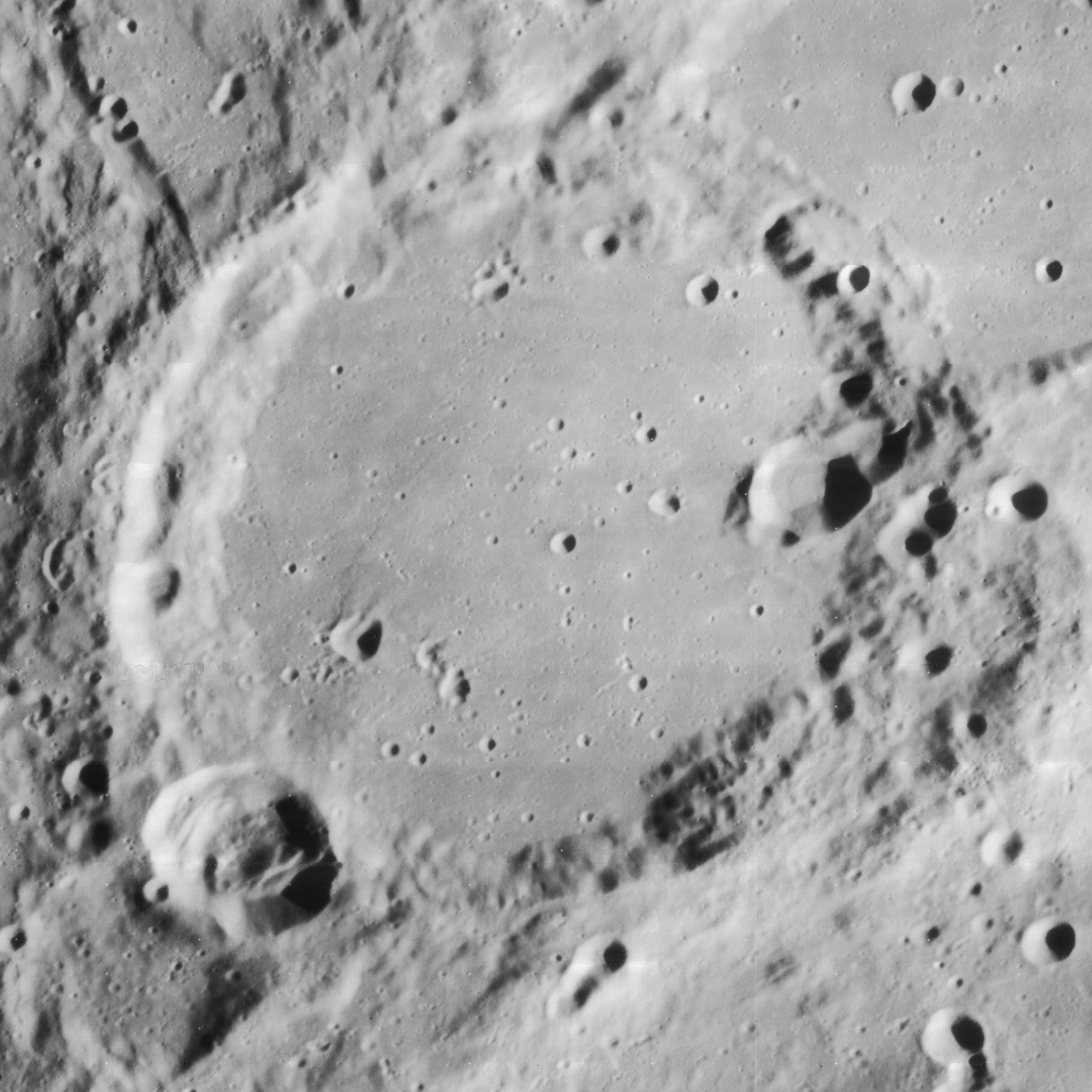
- Lunar Orbiter 4 image
- Coordinates: 52.9°S 57.3°W
- Diameter: 114 km
- Depth: 2.1 km
- Colongitude: 56° at sunrise
- Eponym: Johannes Phocylides Holwarda

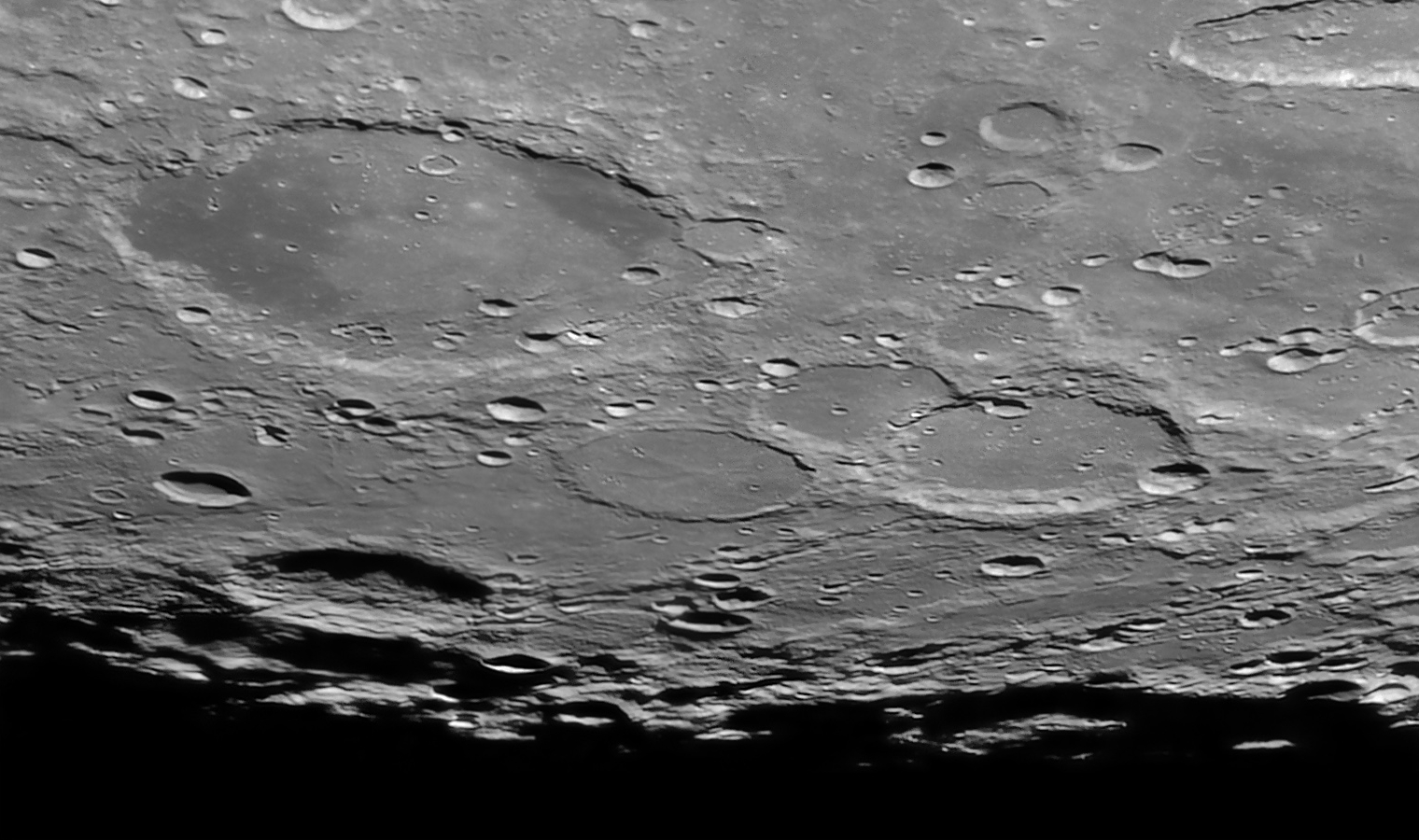
Earth-based view with Nasmyth, Phocylides, and Wargentin at right and Schickard in upper left.

Phocylides is a lunar impact crater located near the southwest rim of the Moon. It overlays the south rim of the crater Nasmyth to the north. To the northwest is the unusual plateau formation of Wargentin. Eastward is the merged formation Schiller, and in the southwest lies Pingré.

The outer wall of Phocylides is worn and eroded, especially along the western edge. The northern edge of the rim is notched and irregular, with a rise of ground joining the south rim of Wargentin. The crater Phocylides F lies across the southern rim. The floor of Phocylides is flooded and relatively smooth, with a few small craterlets and no central peak. T. W. Webb called the interior floor monotonous in hue. The most notable impact on the floor is a crater near the northeast rim.

Phocylides lies to the northwest of the Schiller-Zucchius Basin.

== Satellite craters ==
By convention these features are identified on lunar maps by placing the letter on the side of the crater midpoint that is closest to Phocylides.

Phocylides	Latitude	Longitude	Diameter
A	54.6° S	51.6° W	19 km
B	53.8° S	51.7° W	8 km
C	51.0° S	52.6° W	46 km
D	53.2° S	51.6° W	7 km
E	55.5° S	57.7° W	32 km
F	54.8° S	57.4° W	23 km
G	51.2° S	50.8° W	14 km
J	54.1° S	62.7° W	22 km
K	52.2° S	48.9° W	14 km
KA	52.0° S	48.9° W	12 km
KB	51.7° S	48.8° W	14 km
L	56.9° S	62.7° W	9 km
M	55.5° S	60.5° W	9 km
N	52.1° S	55.5° W	15 km
S	55.9° S	59.8° W	10 km
V	56.6° S	60.6° W	8 km
X	50.5° S	50.6° W	7 km
Z	50.0° S	50.8° W	8 km
