= Johannes Phocylides Holwarda =

Frisian astronomer, physician and philosopher

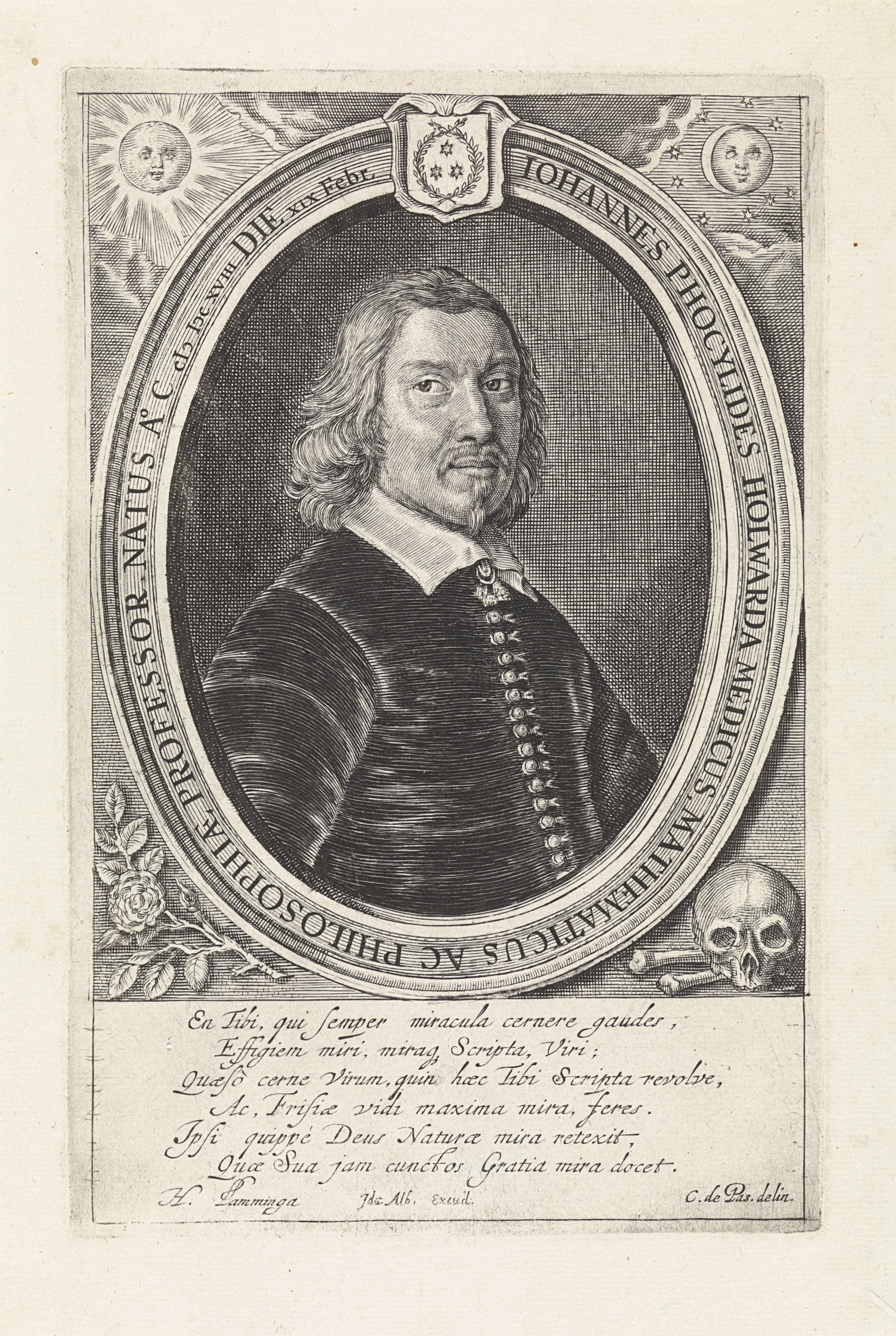
Johannes Phocylides Holwarda

Johannes Phocylides Holwarda (Jan Fokkesz, Jan Fokker, Johann Holwarda, Johannes Fokkes Holwarda, Jan Fokkens Holwarda, Jan Fokkes van haylen) (February 19, 1618—January 22, 1651) was a Frisian astronomer, physician, and philosopher. He was a professor of philosophy at the University of Franeker from 1639 to 1651.

Born in Holwerd, he is best remembered for his discovery of the length of Mira's (Omicron Ceti's) varying appearance cycle. In a systematic study in 1638, he found that Mira disappeared and reappeared in a varying cycle of about 330 days.

Holwarda was also a supporter of "atomism". His Philosophia Naturalis, seu Physica Vetus-Nova, published posthumously in 1651, defines matter and form: matter is extended and divided into atoms while form is the texture of atoms. According to Phocylides, bodies are formed from atoms and a lack of atoms. Atoms, which he distinguished as simple or compound, are solid corpuscles that receive motion directly from God.

The lunar crater Phocylides is named after him.
