= Nasmyth (crater) =

Lunar surface depression

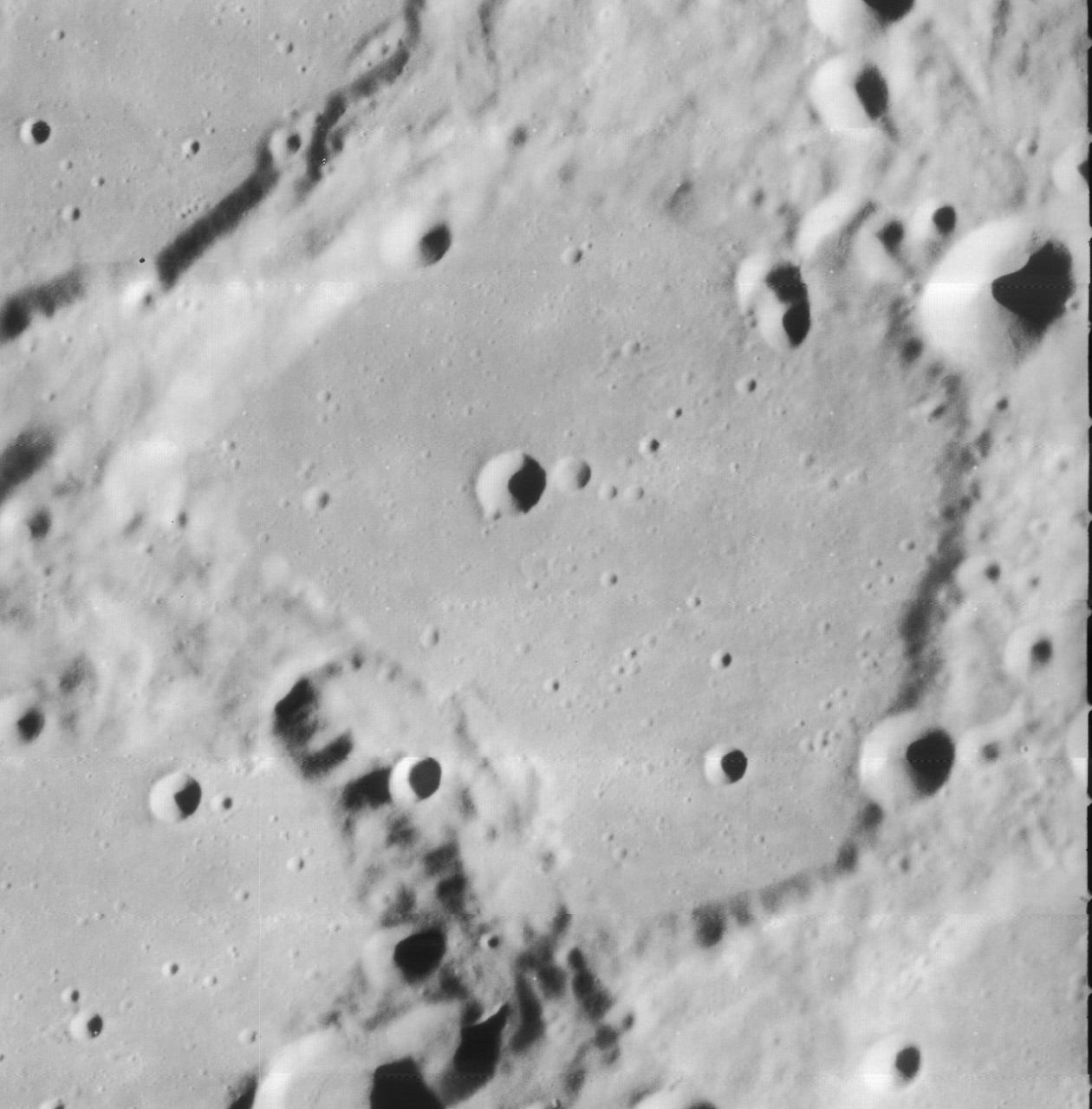
- Lunar Orbiter 4 image
- Coordinates: 50.5°S 56.2°W
- Diameter: 77 km
- Depth: 1.4 km
- Colongitude: 56° at sunrise
- Eponym: James Nasmyth

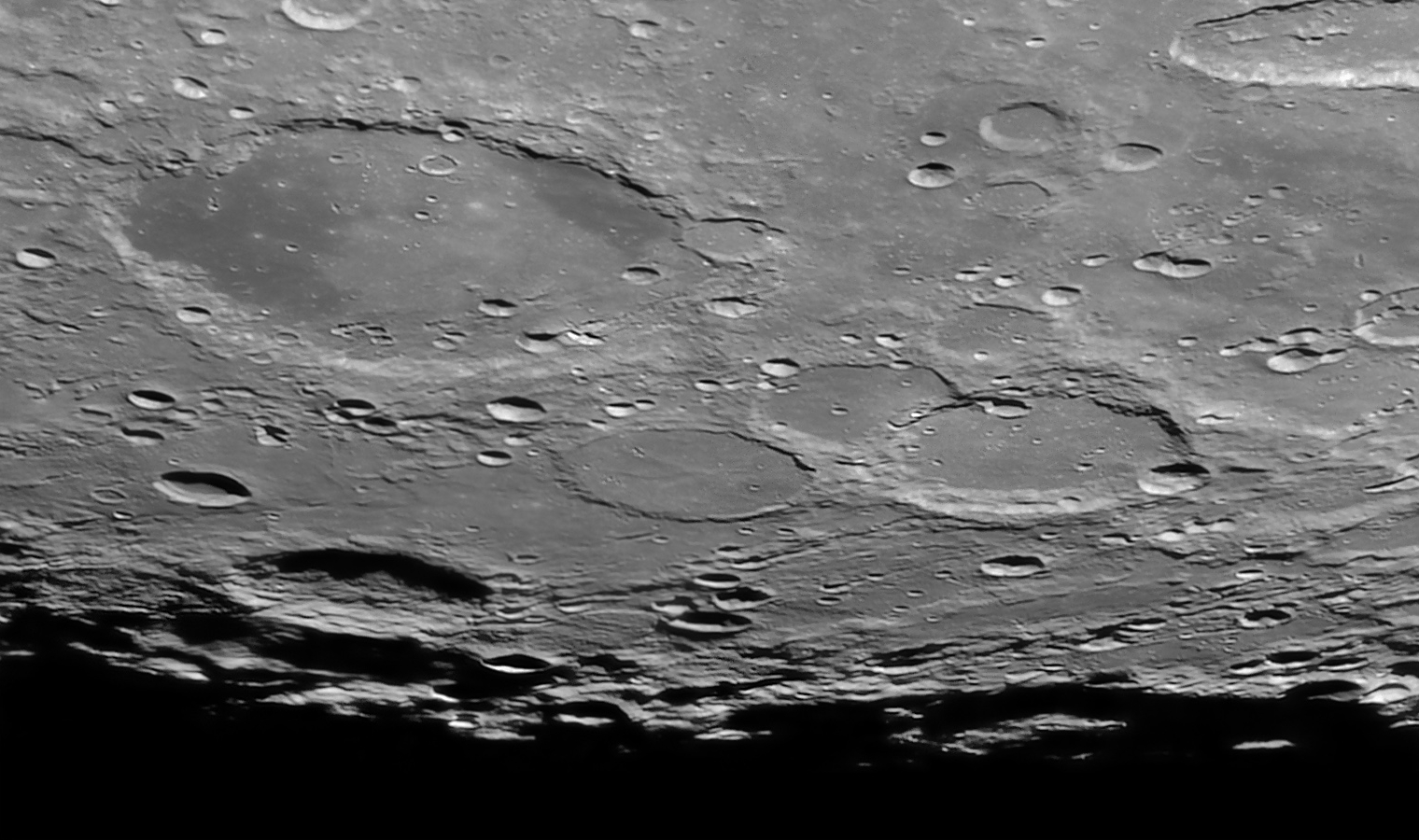
Earth-based view with Nasmyth, Phocylides, and Wargentin at right and Schickard in upper left.

Nasmyth is a lunar impact crater located near the southwestern limb of the Moon. It is attached to the southeast rim of the flooded crater Wargentin, and the southern half is overlain by the larger Phocylides.

The rim of Nasmyth is worn and impacted in several locations by craterlets, most notably Nasmyth D which lies across the north rim. The floor has been flooded by lava flows in the past, making the surface relatively flat and the rim low. There is no central peak within the crater, but the floor is impacted by some small craterlets.

Nasmyth lies to the northwest of the Schiller-Zucchius Basin.

== Satellite craters ==
By convention these features are identified on lunar maps by placing the letter on the side of the crater midpoint that is closest to Nasmyth.

| Nasmyth | Latitude | Longitude | Diameter |
|---|---|---|---|
| D | 49.2° S | 55.3° W | 13 km |
| E | 49.9° S | 57.6° W | 5 km |
| F | 50.0° S | 53.5° W | 9 km |
| G | 49.6° S | 53.8° W | 7 km |
