= Alchymic Quartet =

2022 string quartet by Graham Waterhouse

- String quartet by Graham Waterhouse
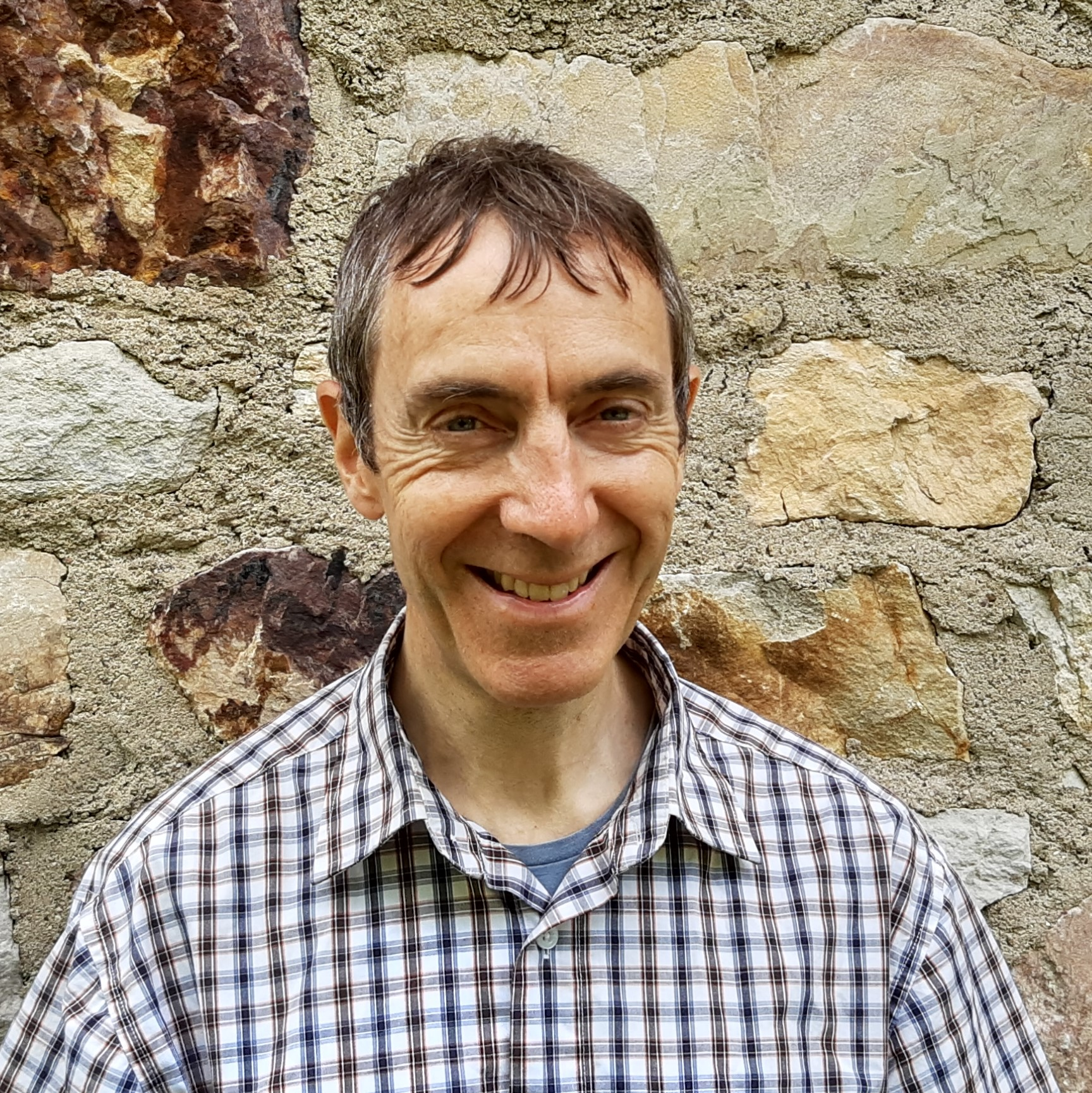
- The composer in 2020
- Performed: 4 November 2022: Gilching
- Movements: 4

Alchymic Quartet is a string quartet by Graham Waterhouse composed in 2022, inspired by chemical experiments of his teacher Andrew Szydlo at Highgate School. It was premiered in Gilching and Munich, in celebration of the composer's 60th birthday, with Szydlo attending and performing.

== History ==
Waterhouse composed Alchymic Quartet in the autumn of 2022, inspired by his Highgate School chemistry teacher Andrew Szydlo. When Waterhouse was a student at the school, and a cellist in the school orchestra, he approached the teacher who played violin and viola to make music together.

He invited Szydlo to the concerts celebrating his 60th birthday in 2022, and Szydlo not only came, but also performed chemical experiments alongside the world premiere of the music on 4 November 2022, and gave a speech (in German) at the main concert the following day.

== Structure and music ==
The work is structured in four movements with the titles naming chemical experiments, which are ideally performed at the same time.

1. Chain Reaction
2. Wave Patterns
3. Colour Transformations (with hommage)
4. Alchymic Cauldron

Wave Patterns are reflected in moving soundscapes (bewegte Klangflächen). The movements have characteristic intervals, clear themes and motifs. The third movement features a quotation from William Byrd who wrote funeral music for Elizabeth I, as an homage to Elizabeth II who died while the piece was being composed. The final Alchymic Cauldron was described as an "organic, purposeful sound development" ("organische, zielgerichtete Klangentwicklung").

== Performances ==
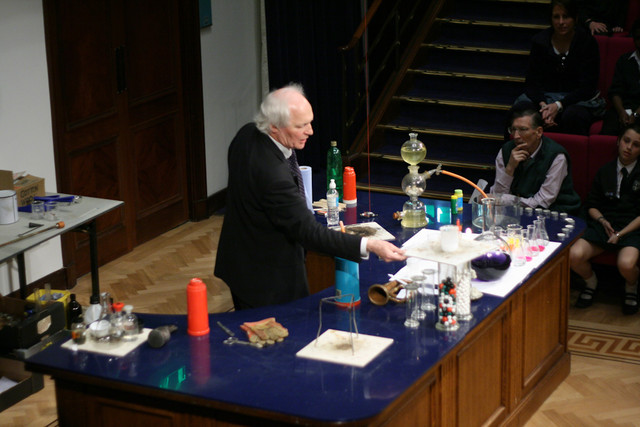
Szydlo performing experiments at the Royal Institution in 2009

Alchymic Quartet was first performed at the Gilching town hall on 4 November 2022 in a concert named Transformationen. It was played by the Philharmonisches Streichquartett München, formed by musicians from the Münchner Philharmoniker, Clément Courtin, Bernhard Metz, Konstantin Sellheim and Manuel von der Nahmer. Szydlo presented the experiments at the same time.

The quartet was played again the following day by the same performers as part of GW60, a concert at the Allerheiligen-Hofkirche in Munich to celebrate the composer's 60th birthday. Szydlo addressed the audience in a laudatio in German, with details from his early contacts with Waterhouse, making music together with the teacher as the violinist.
