= Wargentin (crater) =

Lunar surface depression

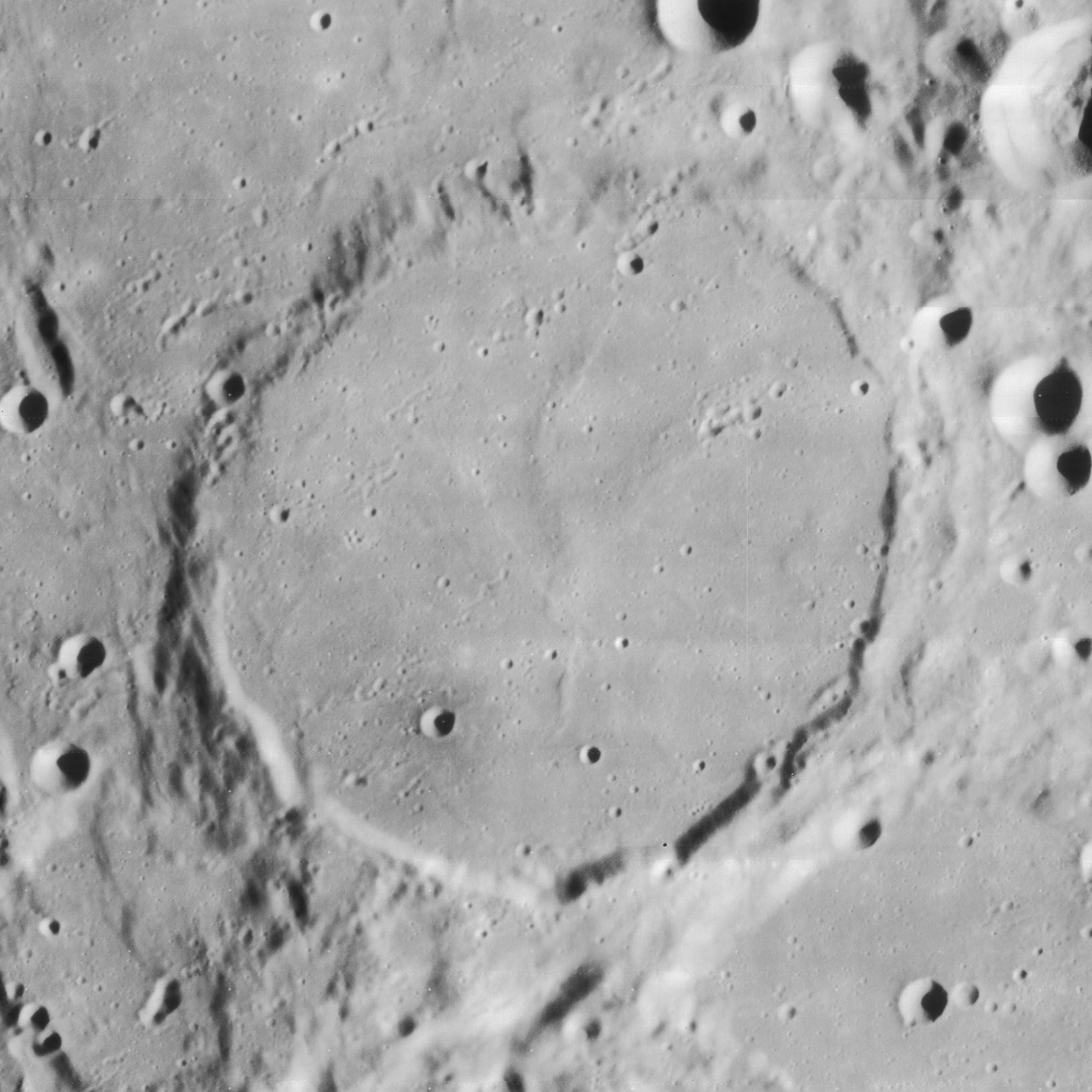
- Lunar Orbiter 4 image
- Coordinates: 49.6°S 60.2°W
- Diameter: 84 km
- Depth: 0.3 km
- Colongitude: 60° at sunrise
- Eponym: Pehr W. Wargentin

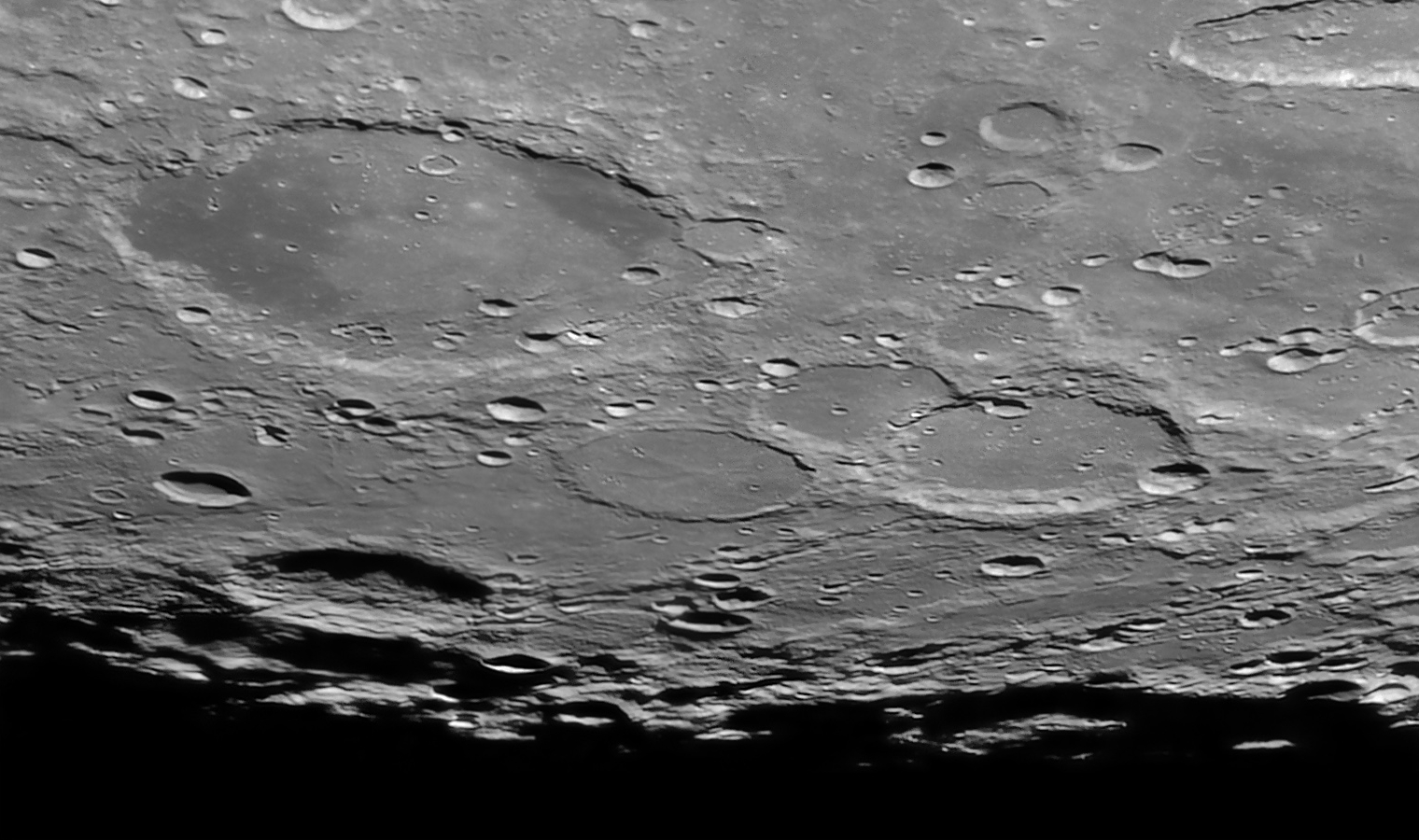
Earth-based view with Nasmyth, Phocylides, and Wargentin at right and Schickard in upper left.

Wargentin is an unusual lunar impact crater which has been filled to its rim by a basaltic lava flow, forming a raised plateau. When the lava flow occurred, it erupted from within the crater walls and proceeded to accumulate until overrunning the lowest portion of the rim. Some blockage then prevented the lava flow from returning to equilibrium. Since the time when this occurred, some ejecta has been deposited across the top, giving the surface a higher albedo than is typical for deposits of basalt.

British astronomer Thomas W. Webb called this crater "a singular formation; a circular elevated plain ... , which, except for a very slight rampart, resembles a large thin cheese." The rim of Wargentin is somewhat worn and is overlain by a few small craters. The outer wall climbs to a height of 0.3 km above the surrounding terrain. A spoked pattern of wrinkle ridges can be discerned on the surface, radiating from the center of the crater.

Wargentin is located on the approaches to the southwest lunar limb, so that it appears elongated when viewed from the Earth. It is connected along the southeast rim to the slightly smaller crater Nasmyth, which is in turn overlaid by the larger Phocylides. To the northeast is a much larger walled plain called Schickard.

The crater is named after eighteenth century Swedish astronomer Pehr W. Wargentin, who observed the brightest maximum ever recorded of the famous variable star Mira.

== Satellite craters ==
By convention these features are identified on lunar maps by placing the letter on the side of the crater midpoint that is closest to Wargentin.

Wargentin	Latitude	Longitude	Diameter
A	47.1° S	59.1° W	21 km
B	51.4° S	67.6° W	18 km
C	47.4° S	61.2° W	12 km
D	51.0° S	65.1° W	16 km
E	50.9° S	66.9° W	16 km
F	51.5° S	66.1° W	20 km
H	47.4° S	60.1° W	9 km
K	48.3° S	57.8° W	7 km
L	48.1° S	58.2° W	11 km
M	48.1° S	58.9° W	7 km
P	48.7° S	56.6° W	9 km
