= Rudolf Clausius =

German physicist and mathematician (1822–1888)

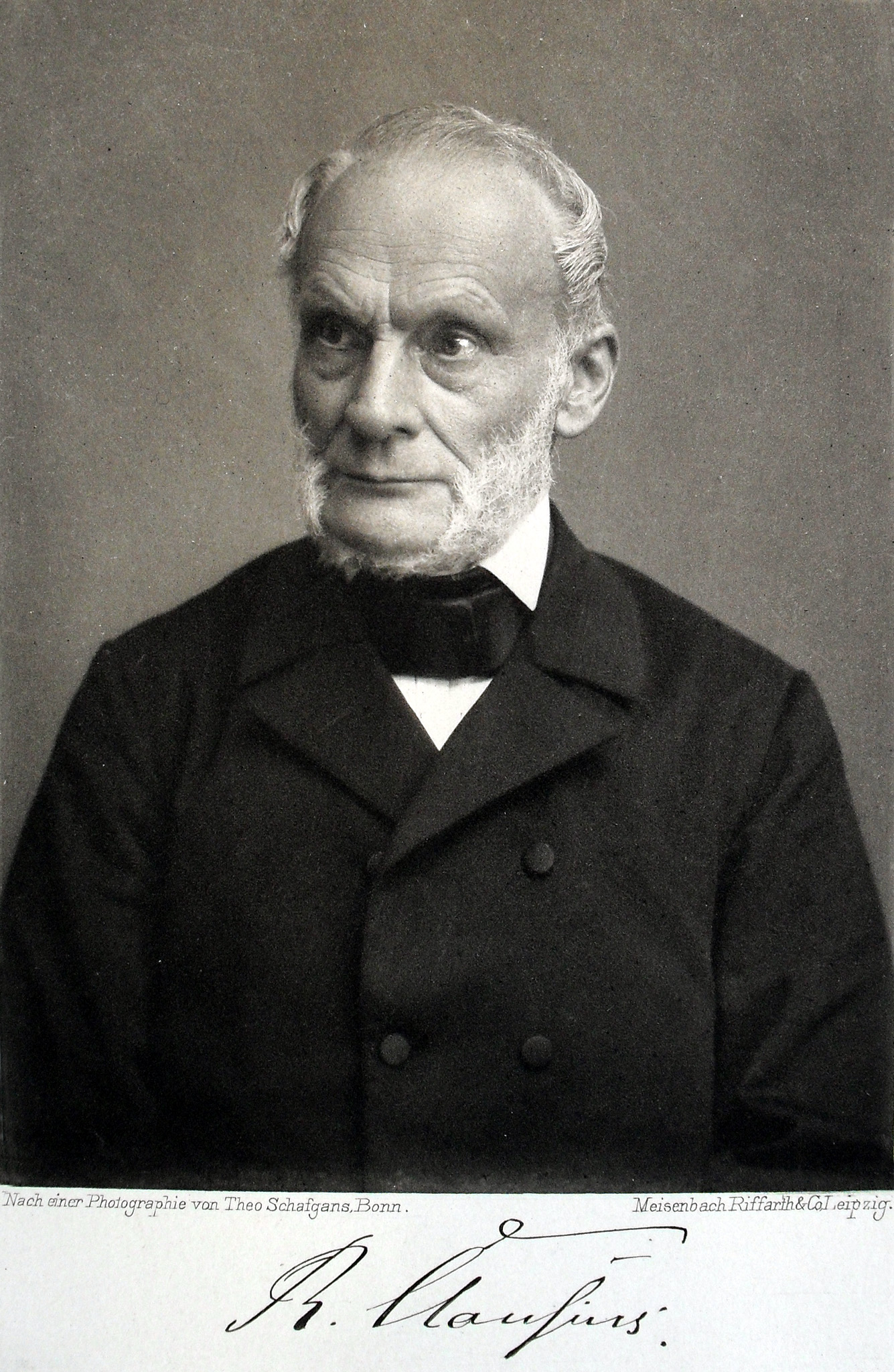
- Born: Rudolf Julius Emanuel Clausius; 2 January 1822; Köslin, Province of Pomerania, Prussia
- Died: 24 August 1888 (aged 66); Bonn, Rhine Province, Prussia, German Empire
- Known for: Chemical thermodynamics; First law of thermodynamics; Second law of thermodynamics; Originator of the concept of entropy; Entropy production; Disgregation; Ideal gas law; Kinetic theory of gases; Virial theorem; Clausius model; Clausius theorem; Clausius–Mossotti relation; Clausius–Clapeyron relation; Clausius–Duhem inequality
- Awards: Poncelet Prize (1882); Copley Medal (1879); ForMemRS (1868)
- Scientific career
- Fields: Physics

Rudolf Julius Emanuel Clausius (German pronunciation: [ˈʁuːdɔlf ˈklaʊzi̯ʊs]; 2 January 1822 – 24 August 1888) was a German physicist and mathematician and is considered one of the central founding fathers of the science of thermodynamics. By his restatement of Sadi Carnot's principle known as the Carnot cycle, he gave the theory of heat a truer and sounder basis. His most important paper, "On the Moving Force of Heat", published in 1850, first stated the basic ideas of the second law of thermodynamics. In 1865 he introduced the concept of entropy. In 1870 he introduced the virial theorem, which applied to heat.

== Life ==
Clausius was born in Köslin (now Koszalin, Poland) in the Province of Pomerania in Prussia. His father was a Protestant and school inspector, and Rudolf studied in the school of his father. In 1838, he went to the Gymnasium in Stettin. Clausius graduated from the University of Berlin in 1844 where he had studied mathematics and physics since 1840 with Gustav Magnus, Peter Gustav Lejeune Dirichlet, and Jakob Steiner. He also studied history with Leopold von Ranke. During 1848, he got his doctorate from the University of Halle on optical effects in Earth's atmosphere. In 1850 he became professor of physics at the Royal Artillery and Engineering School in Berlin and Privatdozent at the Berlin University. In 1855 he became professor at the ETH Zürich, the Swiss Federal Institute of Technology in Zürich, where he stayed until 1867. During that year, he moved to Würzburg and two years later, in 1869 to Bonn.

In 1870 Clausius organized an ambulance corps in the Franco-Prussian War. He was wounded in battle, leaving him with a lasting disability. He was awarded the Iron Cross for his services.

His wife, Adelheid Rimpau died in 1875, leaving him to raise their six children. In 1886, he married Sophie Sack, and then had another child. Two years later, on 24 August 1888, he died in Bonn, Germany.

== Work ==
Clausius's PhD thesis concerning the refraction of light proposed that we see a blue sky during the day, and various shades of red at sunrise and sunset (among other phenomena) due to reflection and refraction of light. Later, Lord Rayleigh would show that it was in fact due to the scattering of light.

His most famous paper, Ueber die bewegende Kraft der Wärme ("On the Moving Force of Heat and the Laws of Heat which may be Deduced Therefrom") was published in 1850, and dealt with the mechanical theory of heat. In this paper, he showed there was a contradiction between Carnot's principle and the concept of conservation of energy. Clausius restated the two laws of thermodynamics to overcome this contradiction. This paper made him famous among scientists. (The third law was developed by Walther Nernst, during the years 1906–1912).

Clausius's most famous statement of the second law of thermodynamics was published in German in 1854, and in English in 1856.

Heat can never pass from a colder to a warmer body without some other change, connected therewith, occurring at the same time.

During 1857, Clausius contributed to the field of kinetic theory after refining August Krönig's very simple gas-kinetic model to include translational, rotational and vibrational molecular motions. In this same work he introduced the concept of 'Mean free path' of a particle.

Clausius deduced the Clausius–Clapeyron relation from thermodynamics. This relation, which is a way of characterizing the phase transition between two states of matter such as solid and liquid, had originally been developed in 1834 by Émile Clapeyron.

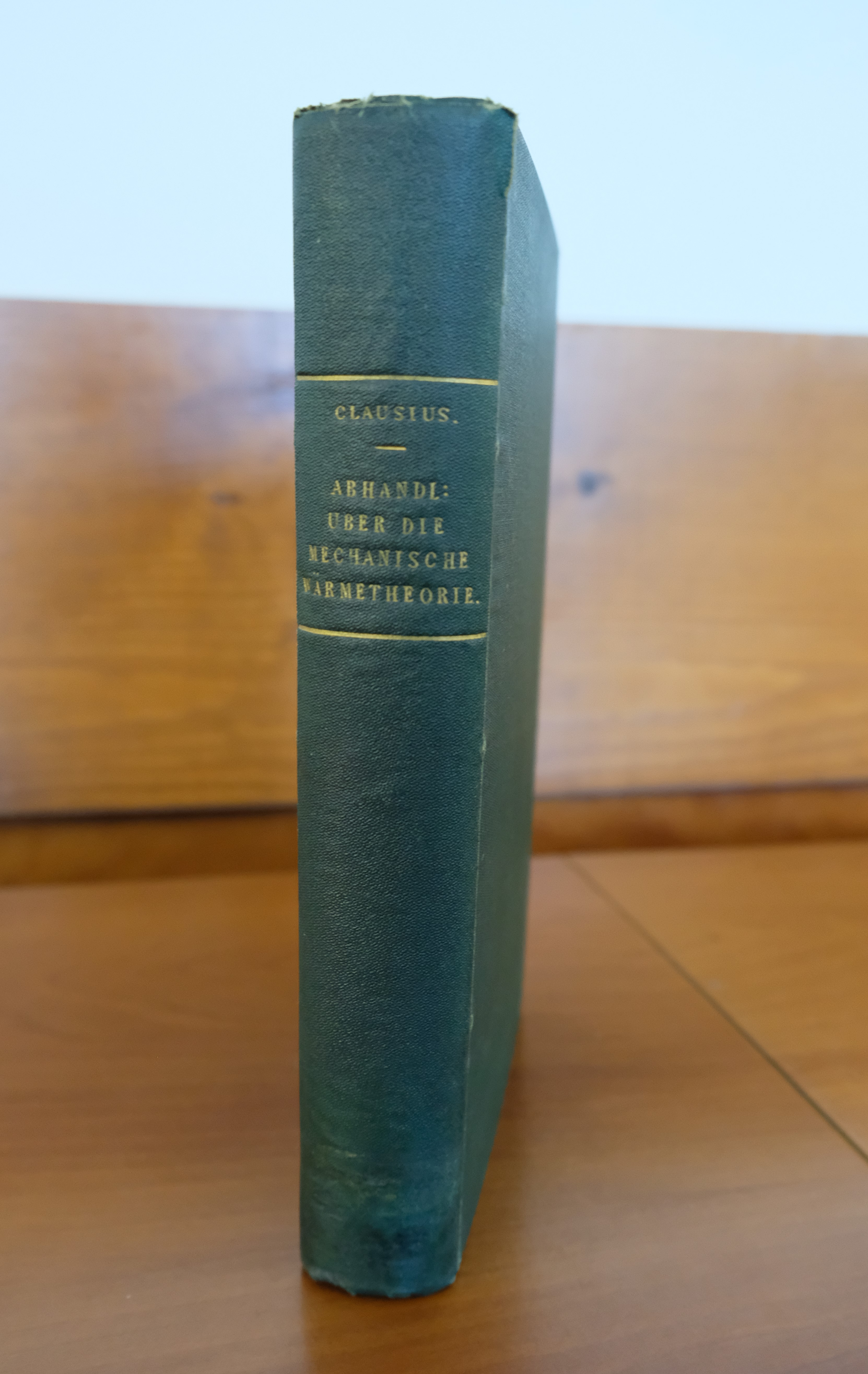
1864 edition of Clausius's Abhandlungen über die mechanische Wärmetheorie, volume I

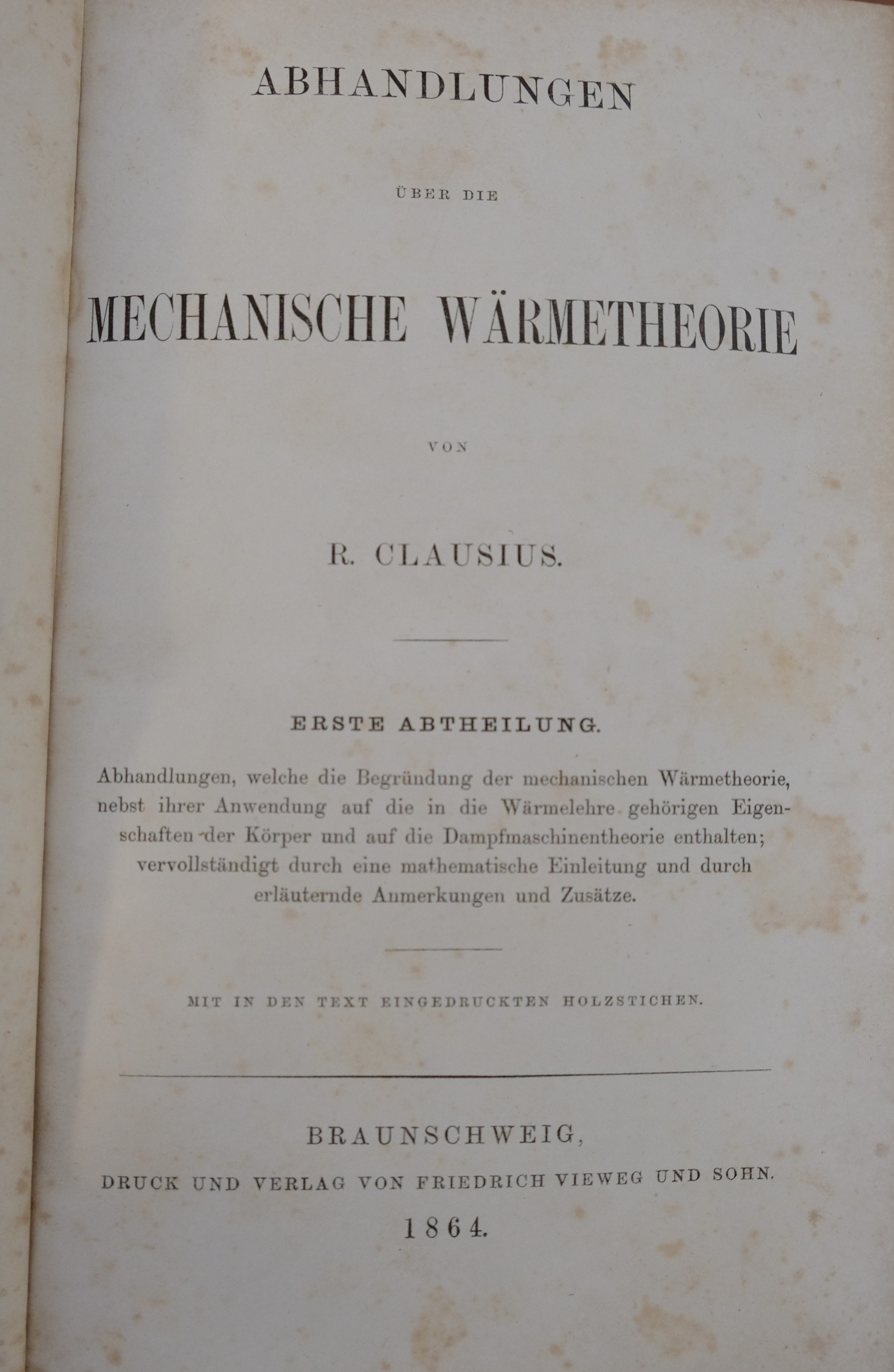
Title page of an 1864 edition of Clausius's Abhandlungen über die mechanische Wärmetheorie, volume I

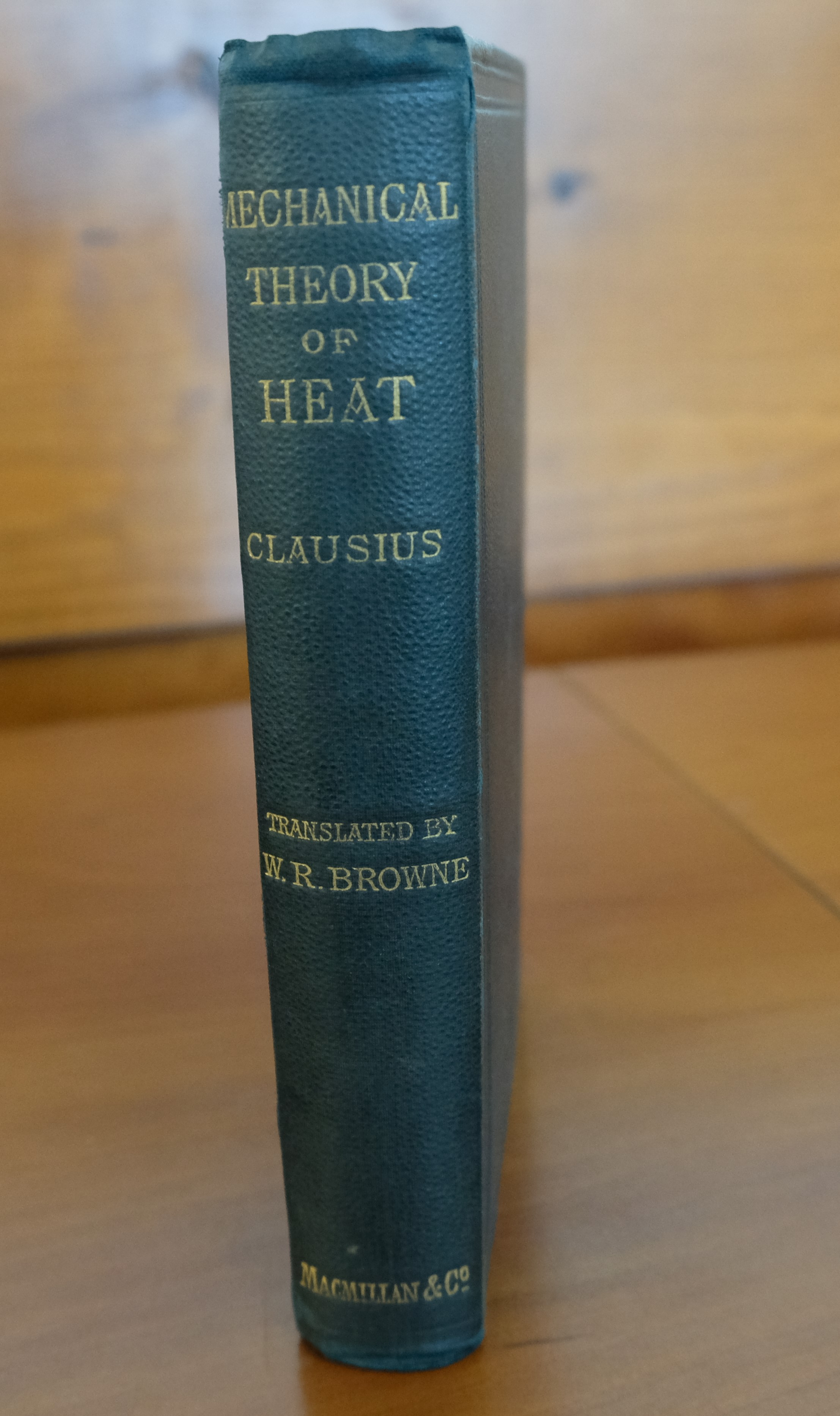
1879 English translation of Clausius's The Mechanical Theory of Heat

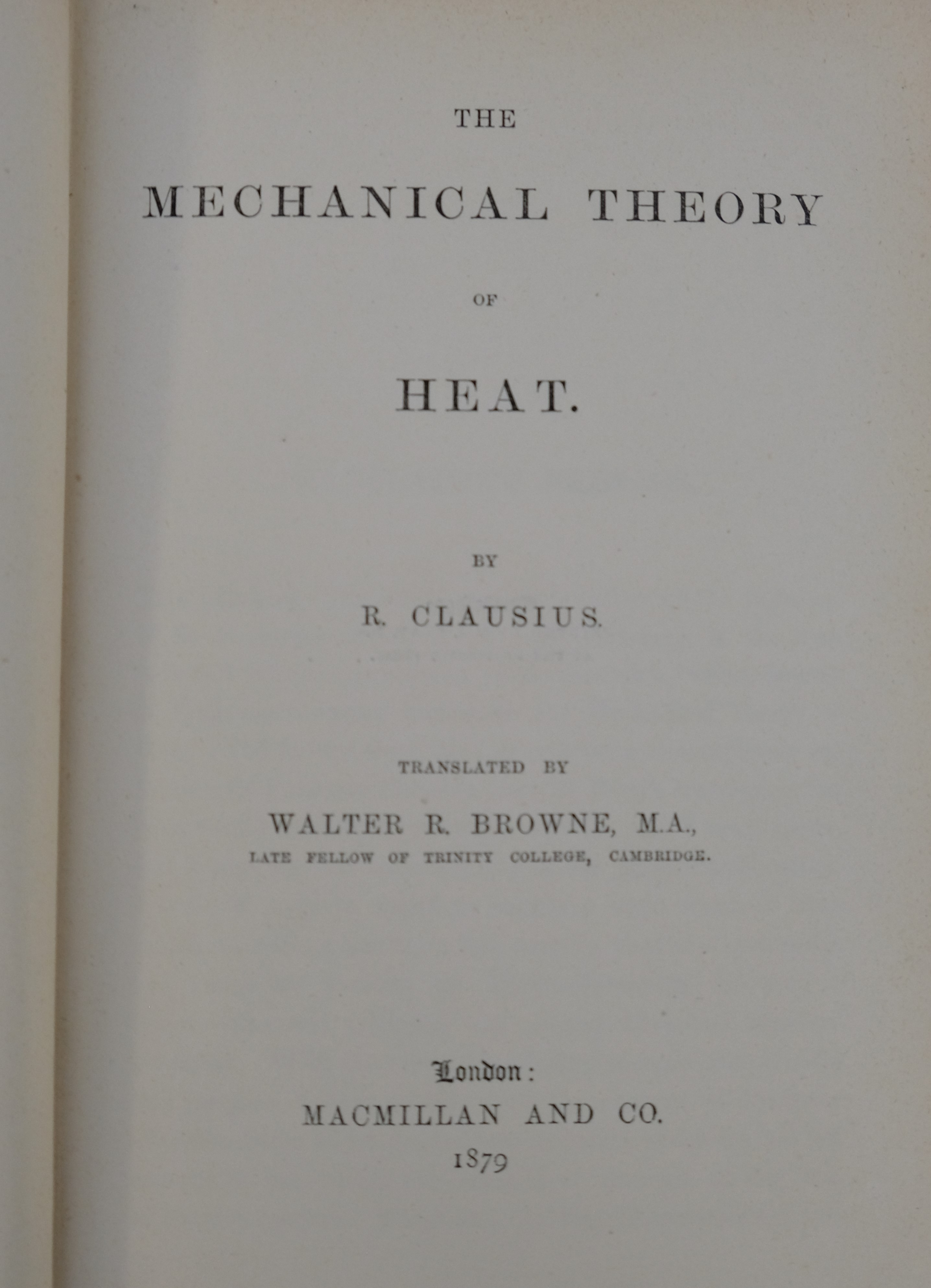
Title page of an 1879 English translation of Clausius's The Mechanical Theory of Heat

=== Entropy ===
In 1865, Clausius gave the first mathematical version of the concept of entropy, and also gave it its name. Clausius chose the word because the meaning (from Greek ἐν en "in" and τροπή tropē "transformation") is "content transformative" or "transformation content" ("Verwandlungsinhalt").

I prefer going to the ancient languages for the names of important scientific quantities, so that they may mean the same thing in all living tongues. I propose, accordingly, to call S the entropy of a body, after the Greek word 'transformation'. I have designedly coined the word entropy to be similar to 'energy', for these two quantities are so analogous in their physical significance, that an analogy of denomination seemed to me helpful.

— Rudolf Clausius, Ueber verschiedene für die Anwendung bequeme Formen der Hauptgleichungen der mechanischen Wärmetheorie

He used the now abandoned unit 'Clausius' (symbol: Cl) for entropy.

1 Clausius (Cl) = 1 calorie/degree Celsius (cal/°C) = 4.1868 joules per kelvin (J/K)

The landmark 1865 paper in which he introduced the concept of entropy ends with the following summary of the first and second laws of thermodynamics:

The energy of the universe is constant.
The entropy of the universe tends to a maximum.

Leon Cooper added that in this way he succeeded in coining a word that meant the same thing to everybody: nothing.

== Tributes ==
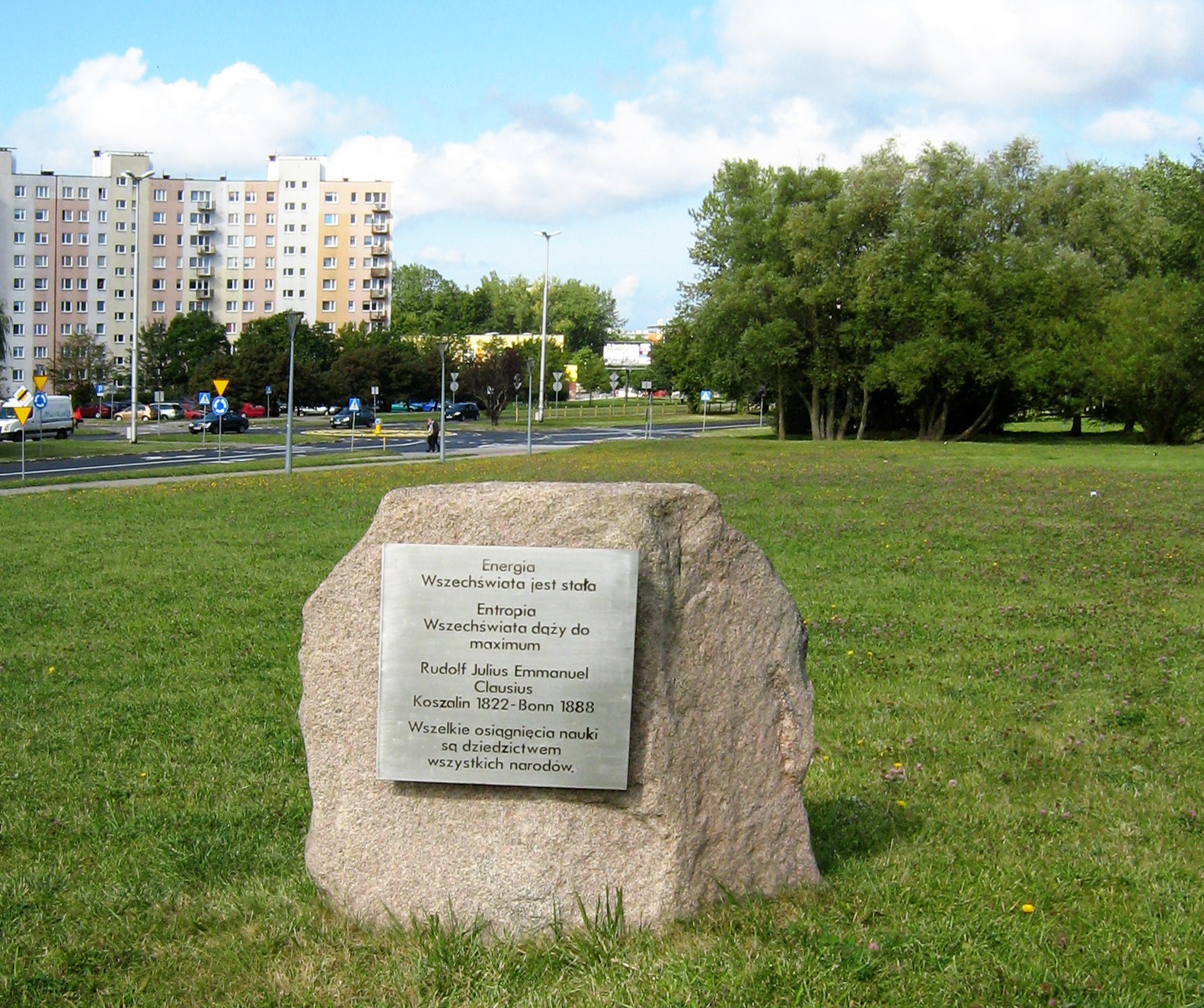
Memorial stone in front of the Koszalin University of Technology in Poland, with the laws of thermodynamics as formulated by Clausius

- Honorary Membership of the Institution of Engineers and Shipbuilders in Scotland in 1859.IESIS Institution of Engineers and Shipbuilders in Scotland
- Iron Cross of 1870
- Fellow of the Royal Society of London in 1868 and received its Copley Medal in 1879.
- Member of the Royal Swedish Academy of Sciences in 1878.
- Huygens Medal in 1870.
- Foreign Member of the Accademia Nazionale dei Lincei in Rome in 1880
- Honorary membership in the American Society of Mechanical Engineers in 1882.
- Member of the German Academy of Sciences Leopoldina in 1880
- Poncelet Prize in 1883.
- Honorary doctorate from the University of Würzburg in 1882.
- Foreign Member of the Royal Netherlands Academy of Arts and Sciences in 1886.
- Pour le Mérite for Arts and Sciences in 1888
- The lunar crater Clausius named in his honor.
- Elected an honorary member of the Manchester Literary and Philosophical Society in 1886
- A memorial in his home town of Koszalin in 2009

== Publications ==
- Clausius, R. (1867). The Mechanical Theory of Heat – with its Applications to the Steam Engine and to Physical Properties of Bodies. London: John van Voorst. "editions:PwR_Sbkwa8IC." English translations of nine papers.

== See also ==
- Hans Peter Jørgen Julius Thomsen, one of the founders of the thermochemistry.
