= Frans Maurits Jaeger =

Dutch chemist

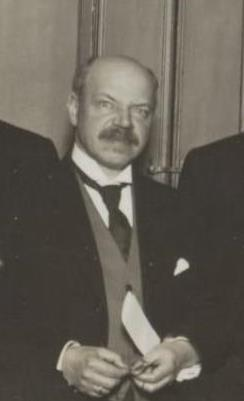
- F. M. Jaeger (1926)
- Born: May 11, 1877; The Hague, The Netherlands
- Died: March 2, 1945 (aged 67); Haren (Groningen), The Netherlands
- Occupation(s): Chemist, Historian of chemistry
- Spouse: April 4, 1902, Maria Arnoldina de Bruyn.
- Children: one son and one daughter
- Parent(s): Frans Maurits Jaeger,(father); Agnes Eleonore Adolfina Jaeger (mother)

Frans Maurits Jaeger (May 11, 1877, in The Hague – March 2, 1945, in Haren) was a Dutch chemist and specialist in the history of chemistry. He is known for his studies of the symmetry of crystals.

== Biography ==
Frans Maurits Jaeger was born on May 11, 1877, in The Hague, The Netherlands. He started studying chemistry in Leiden in 1895, passing his degree in 1898, and his doctorate in 1900. Thereafter he also studied crystallography in Berlin, Germany.

In 1904 he was appointed assistant professor (privaatdocent) at the University of Amsterdam. In 1908 he moved to the University of Groningen as lecturer and in 1909 was promoted professor, head of the department of inorganic and physical chemistry, as a successor of Jacob Böeseken.

From 1910 to 1911 he worked as research fellow of the geophysical laboratory of the Carnegie Institution for Science in Washington, D.C.

In 1915 he became a member of the Royal Netherlands Academy of Arts and Sciences. In 1929 he received a George Fisher Baker non-residential lectureship in chemistry at Cornell University in Ithaca (USA). He retired in 1943.

Frans Maurits Jaeger died on March 2, 1945, in Haren (Groningen), The Netherlands.

== Main works ==
- Kristallografische en molekulaire symmetrie van plaatsings-isomere benzolderivaten (1903)
- Lectures on the principle of symmetry and its applications in all natural sciences (1917)
- Elementen en atomen eens en thans. Schetsen uit de ontwikkelingsgeschiedenis der elementenleer en atomistiek (1918).
- Inleiding tot de studie der kristalkunde.” Introduction in the study of cristals(1924)
