= Andrew Szydlo =

British chemist and chemistry teacher

Andrew Szydlo CChem FRSC
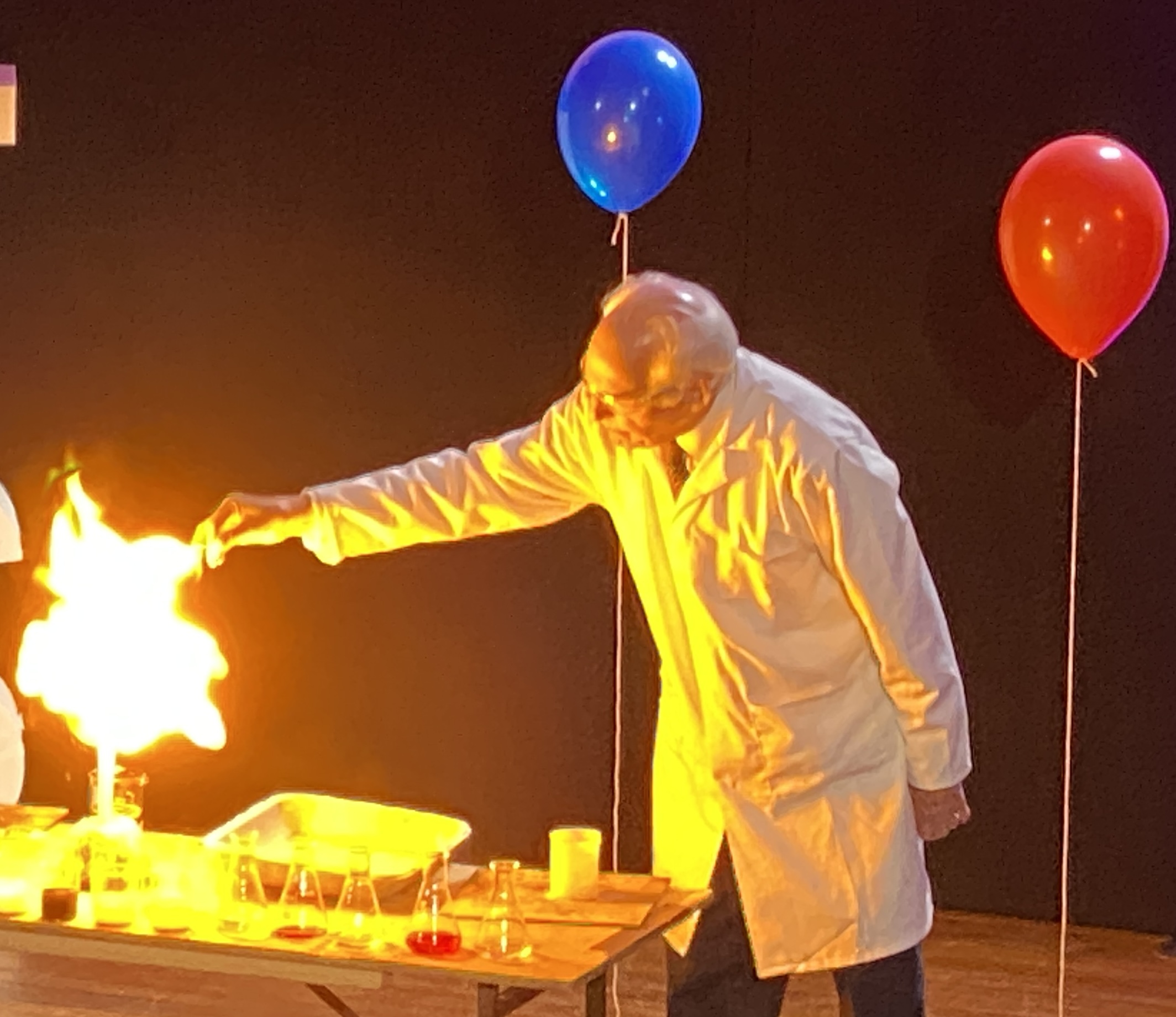
- Szydlo at Bright Ideas conference, Durham, 2021
- Born: Zbigniew Szydlo; 1949 (age 76–77); London, England
- Education: Imperial College London, London University
- Occupation: Chemistry Teacher
- Employer: Highgate School
- Website: andrewszydlo.com

Andrew Zbigniew Szydlo (/ˈʃɪdloʊ/ SHID-low; born 1949) is a British chemist and chemistry teacher of Polish descent. Born in London, he is best known for his talks and lectures on chemistry.

== Early life and education ==
Szydlo was born in London, England to Polish parents, Kazimierz and Daniela (née Suchecka). Daniela was one of many Polish children who were forcibly expatriated to Siberia by Soviet forces in 1942, and her experiences as an orphaned child in India have been described in an interview which she gave in 2011 and also in the book Poles in India. Szydlo attended Ellerslie Junior Mixed School in Shepherd's Bush, followed by Latymer Upper School, and then Imperial College London and University College London.

He holds MSc, PhD, DIC, ACGI, and is a Fellow of the Royal Society of Chemistry.

An expert on the history of alchemy, Szydlo is the author of the standard work on the Polish alchemist, Michael Sendivogius. The thesis of his book "Water that does not wet hands": The Alchemy of Michael Sendivogius, which argues that Sendivogius' role in the discovery of oxygen has not received proper attention, has won widespread acceptance within the academic community. He advanced this argument in a leading article for History Today, co-authored with Richard Brzezinski, entitled "A New Light on Alchemy". His work on seventeenth-century science is an ongoing project to which he hopes to devote further attention.

== Teaching career ==
He has taught chemistry at Highgate School, an independent school in North London, since January 1975. He currently teaches children as part of the school's community engagement programme. In 2020, Szydlo was awarded a Pearson National Teaching award for Lifetime Achievement.

In 2015 he published Schoolmaster's Diary, a photo diary celebrating four decades of school life seen through his chemistry teacher's lens.

== Public engagement ==
He frequently gives public lectures in the United Kingdom on topics including the History of Chemistry. Select notable performances include those at Cambridge University, Durham University, University College London, the Royal Institution, Cheltenham Science Festival and Hampton Court. These have received much acclaim: writing in the journal Chemistry & Industry on Szydlo's performance at Cambridge, John Wilkins remarked that "Dr Szydlo exceeded all expectations; he raced through vast tracts of practical chemistry, history, alchemy, the discovery of oxygen, the internal combustion engine, and on occasion, introduced music too. His lecture was interspersed with flashes, bangs, colour changes, detonations and eruptions, keeping the 350-strong crowd on the edge of their seats throughout." This lively, multi-media approach characterises Szydlo's performances, which include experiments drawn from a wide repertory, ranging from the chemistry of colour to pyrotechnics and high explosives. He has also appeared at several festivals as part of the Guerilla Science team. He also lectures regularly at schools throughout the United Kingdom, and has remarked that he often finds the audiences he addresses at under-privileged schools the most inspiring. These lectures are sometimes featured in the local press. Szydlo also regularly gives talks for the wider community, including such institutions as the Stuart Low Trust, Haringey Council Cared for Children, and the Polish Scouting and Guiding Association. His recent webinars for students in Turkey and Tunisia have been very well received. He has also been invited to give numerous lectures and demonstrations abroad, including Poland, Mauritius and Namibia.

Eleven of his recent lectures at the Royal Institution: Magic of Chemistry (2014), Blaze of Steel (2015), Fireworks and Waterworks (2016), Bonfires with a Bang (2017), Chemistry of Coal (2018), Metal Mayhem (2019), Chemical Wonders (2022), The explosive History of Hydrogen (2022), The Volcanic Chemistry of Sulfur (2024), Explosive Chemistry (2024) and The Magic of Mercury (2026) have been made available on YouTube. His Tedx talks in Newcastle and Manchester have received widespread acclaim, as has his appearance at the 15 Seconds Festival in Graz (2019). He is also featured in the Royal Society of Chemistry's 175 Faces of Chemistry and on the University College London's Faces of UCL.

He has collaborated with Andrea Sella of University College London and the author Hugh Aldersey-Williams in Elements, an exhibition at the Wellcome Collection, where he spoke about the Dutch alchemist Cornelis Drebbel, situating Drebbel in a broader scientific and historical context and illustrating the talk with lively experiments. Aldersey-Williams has worked with Szydlo before, both as a pupil at Highgate School, where he recalls Szydlo as 'a man of many talents ... always liable to whip out his gipsy violin mid-lesson', and in writing his book Periodic Tales, when he recruited Szydlo's expertise in an attempt to recreate the experiment that discovered phosphorus.

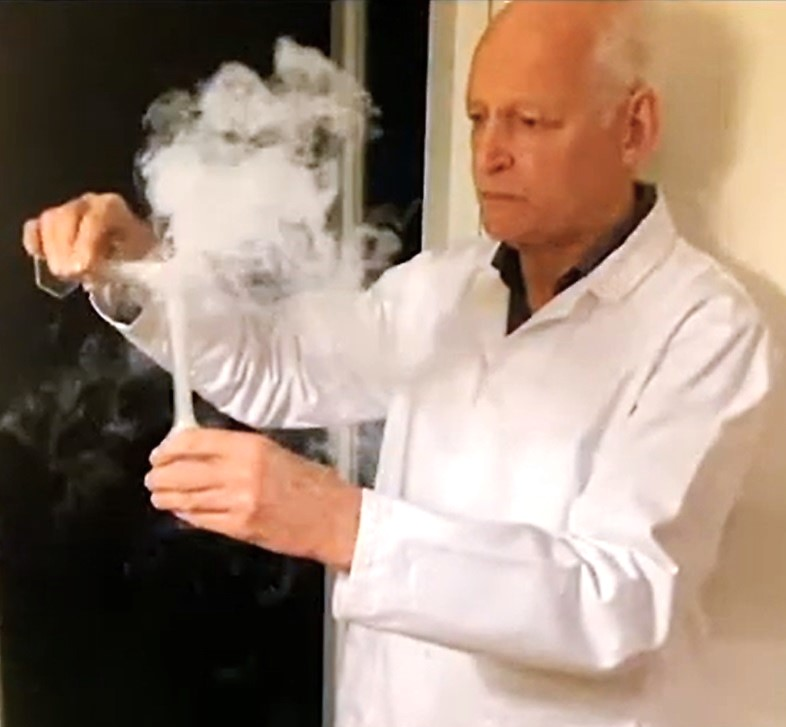
Szydlo performing an experiment with gases in 2021

He has appeared in six television serials: as a chemistry teacher in That'll Teach 'em (Channel 4, 2006) and Sorcerer's Apprentice (CBBC, 2007); as a science historian in Absolute Zero (BBC4, 2007); as a chemist in Generals at War (National Geographic, 2009); in Big, Bigger, Biggest (Channel 5, 2009); and as "The Doc" in Secrets of Everything (BBC3, 2012).

== Wider specialities ==
Andrew Szydlo is an accomplished player of instruments including the violin, piano, bugle and accordion. The string quartet Alchymic Quartet by Graham Waterhouse, whom he taught at Highgate School and has maintained a friendship with since, was inspired by his chemical experiments, which he performed them for the premiere of the quartet in November 2022. Szydlo also has considerable expertise in photography. He has exhibited his own photographs, and recently contributed a preface to a book of photographs published by the artist Stephane Graff. His other interests include Polish dancing, automobile engineering, meteorology, beekeeping, and mycology. Amongst his pupils, he is renowned for lessons which incorporate unusual and spectacular experiments, and for bursts of theatricality such as blowing fire and cooling hot drinks with liquid nitrogen before tasting them. His lecture and television performances reflect his broad cultural interests and distinctive character.

Szydlo has the highest rank (Harcmistrz) in the Polish Scouting Association, and has regularly participated in its activities since 1965. Szydlo's account of one of his cub scout meetings from 1971 has recently been made into a documentary film by John Chrzanowski.

At Highgate School, he runs an automotive engineering society where he teaches students using old Triumph Heralds. He has published award-winning articles reflecting on his adventures.

== Selected publications ==
1. A New Light on Alchemy (1997)
2. Teaching Experimental Chemistry in English Schools (2012)
3. The Chemical Theatre - Education, Entertainment
4. Michael Faraday the Educator (2017)
5. Two English Chemists/Authors/Teachers: John Read and James Riddick Partington (2018)
6. History of Fire (2019)
7. Hydrogen - Some Historical Highlights (Mar 2021)
8. Chemical Electricity (Dec 2021)
9. The Beginnings of Chemistry: From Ancient Times Until 1661(2022)
10. Science Curiosities Cabinet And The Chemical Showcase (2023)
11. The Extraordinary World of Sulphur - Part 1 (2024)
12. The Extraordinary World of Sulphur - Part 2 (2025)
13. 111 European Chemists (2025)
14. Mercury: The Element That Changed the World (2025)
