= Lacus Excellentiae =

Lunar surface mare

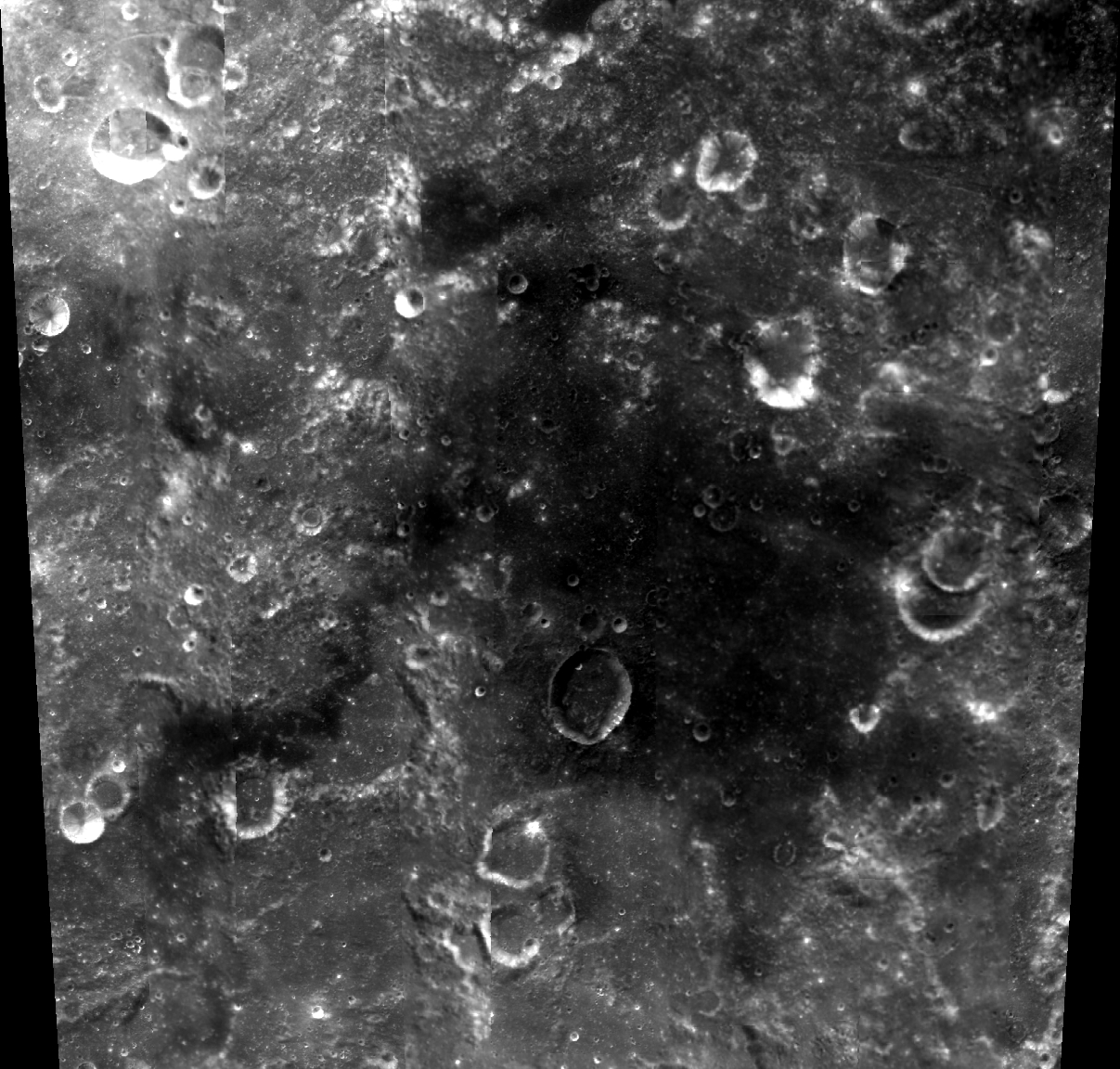
- Coordinates: 35.4°S 44.0°W
- Diameter: 184 km
- Eponym: Lake of Excellence

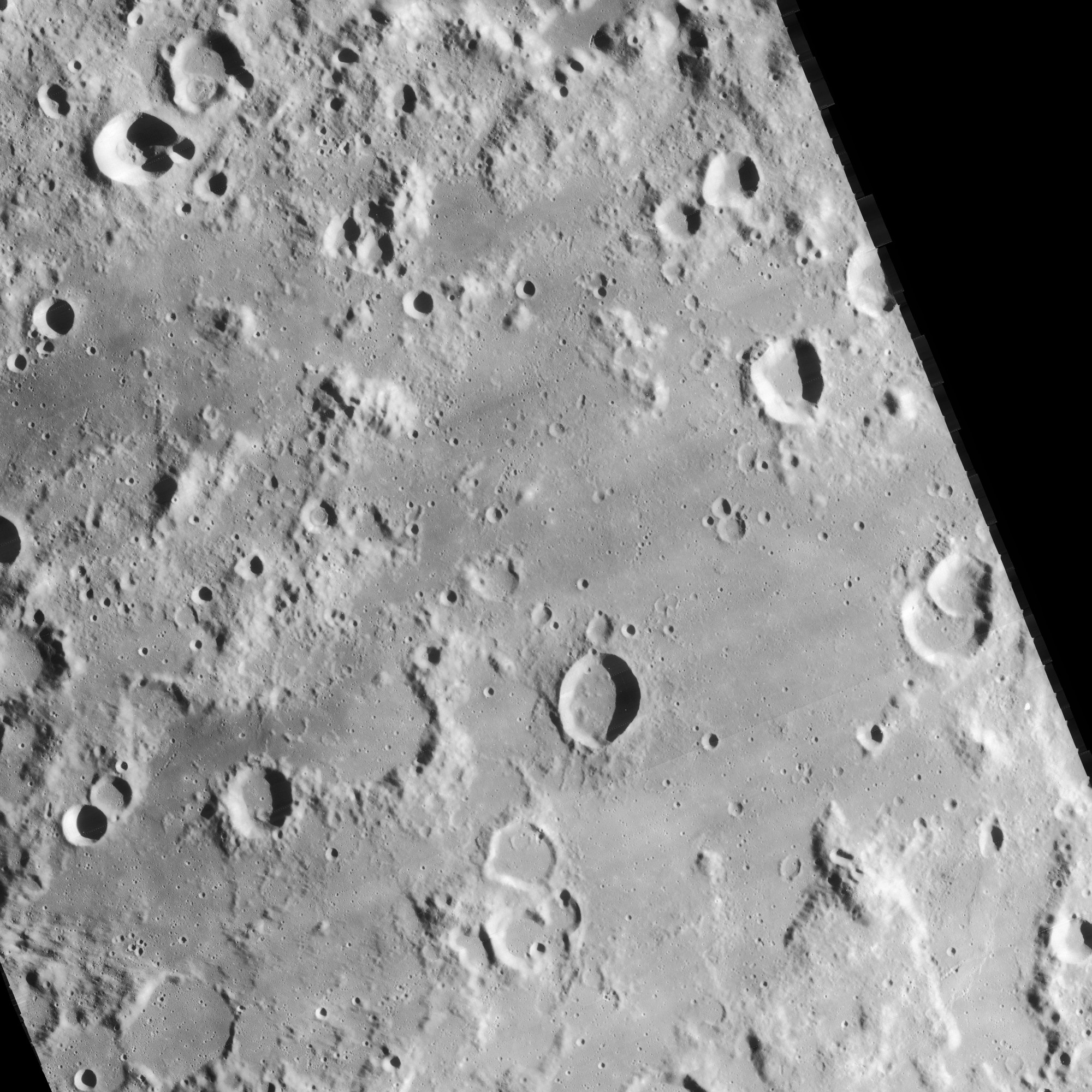
Lunar Orbiter 4 image showing approximately the same extent as the Clementine image above.

Lacus Excellentiae (Latin excellentiae, "Lake of Excellence") is a relatively small, irregular lunar mare in the southern latitudes of the Moon, amidst the rugged terrain to the south of the larger Mare Humorum. The most prominent feature within the diameter of this basin is the small crater Clausius.

The selenographic coordinates of this feature are 35.4°S 44.0°W and it lies within a diameter of 184 km. The name of this lunar lake is a relatively recent addition to lunar nomenclature, being officially approved in 1976 by the IAU General Assembly.

The Lacus Excellentiae was the impact site of the SMART-1 lunar orbiter. This probe impacted the lunar surface on September 3, 2006 and was observed by astronomers to determine the properties of the ejected materials.
