= Clausius (crater) =

Lunar impact crater

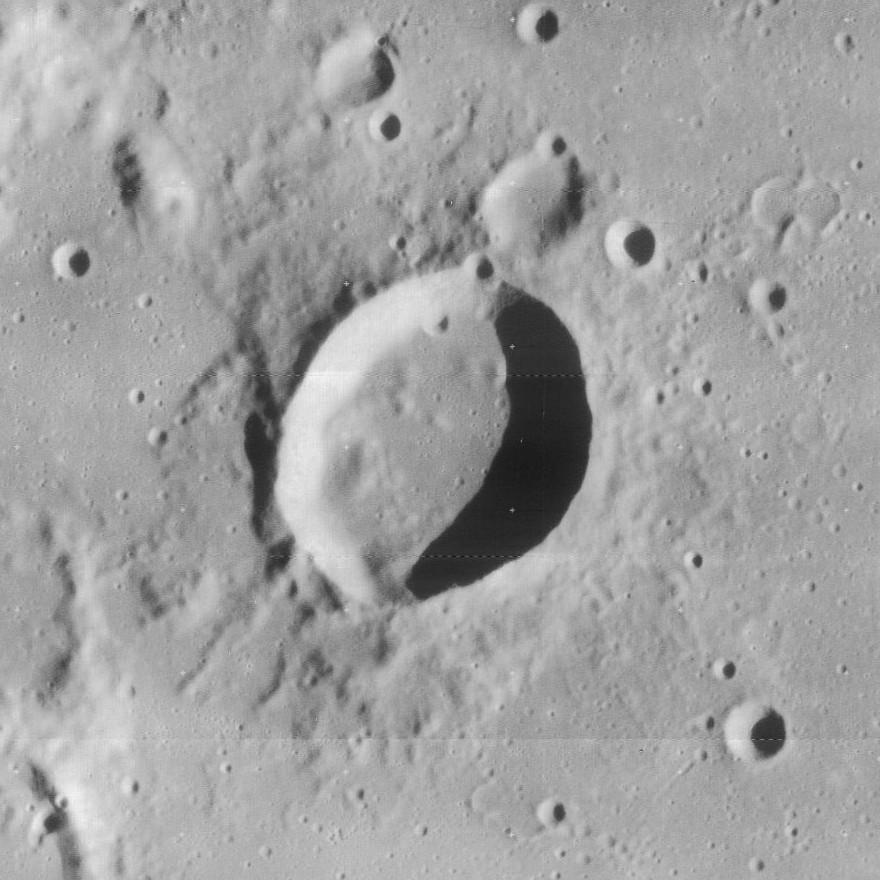
- Lunar Orbiter 4 image
- Coordinates: 36.9°S 43.3°W
- Diameter: 24.20 km (15.04 mi)
- Depth: 2.5 km (1.6 mi)
- Colongitude: 44° at sunrise
- Eponym: Rudolf J. E. Clausius

Clausius is a lunar impact crater that is located in the southwest part of the Moon, in the small lunar mare designated Lacus Excellentiae. It is completely enclosed by mare material, although the tiny satellite crater Clausius A lies just to the north. The rim of Clausius is low and sharp, with a slightly oval shape that is longer in the north–south direction.

The interior floor has been flooded by basaltic lava to a depth of about 400 m (1,300 ft), and it appears level and almost featureless with a darker surface that matches the mare surface that surrounds the crater exterior. This surface has been partially covered by later ejecta deposits. The outer ejecta skirt of Clausius has been partially inundated by later flows of lava.

This formation is named after German physicist and mathematician Rudolf Clausius (1822-1888). His name was introduced with the lunar nomenclature of Edmund N. Nevill in 1876. Its designation was formally adopted by the International Astronomical Union in 1935.

== Satellite craters ==
By convention these features are identified on lunar maps by placing the letter on the side of the crater midpoint that is closest to Clausius.

Clausius	Latitude	Longitude	Diameter
A	36.3° S	43.9° W	7 km
B	36.0° S	40.1° W	23 km
BA	35.7° S	40.1° W	17 km
C	35.4° S	38.9° W	15 km
D	38.2° S	44.6° W	18 km
E	36.4° S	45.5° W	6 km
F	36.5° S	38.1° W	26 km
G	37.1° S	41.0° W	6 km
H	37.8° S	39.6° W	7 km
J	37.2° S	42.7° W	4 km
