= Franz Josef Huber =

German SS general (1902–1975)

- Born: 22 January 1902; Munich, Kingdom of Bavaria, German Empire
- Died: 30 January 1975 (aged 73); Munich, West Germany
- Military career
- Allegiance: Nazi Germany
- Branch: Munich Police 1922–1934; Gestapo 1934–1945
- Service years: 1933–1945
- Rank: SS-Brigadeführer and Generalmajor of Police
- Commands: Inspekteur der Sicherheitspolizei (SiPo) und des Sicherheitsdienst (SD) for Reichsgaue Vienna, Lower Danube and Upper Danube
- Awards: War Merit Cross, 1st and 2nd class with swords

Franz Josef Huber (22 January 1902 – 30 January 1975) was a German police and security service official during the Weimar Republic and Nazi Germany eras. He joined the Nazi Party and the Schutzstaffel (SS) in 1937 and worked closely with Gestapo chief Heinrich Müller. After the German annexation of Austria in 1938, Huber was posted to Vienna, where he was appointed Inspector of the Security Police (Sicherheitspolizei; SiPo) and Security Service (Sicherheitsdienst; SD) for the Reichsgaue Vienna, Lower Danube and Upper Danube. He rose to the rank of SS-Brigadeführer and was responsible for mass deportations of Jews from the area. After the end of World War II, Huber underwent denazification proceedings but never served any prison time. He was employed by the West German Federal Intelligence Service from 1955 to 1964. He died in Munich in 1975.

== Early life ==
Huber was born on 22 January 1902 in Munich. He attended school through "seven classes of gymnasium". In his last year of school, Huber served as a Zeitfreiwilliger (timed volunteer), which were reserve units that could be mobilized on short notice by the army. In mid-1922, he entered the Munich police service and by 1923 was a "auxiliary assistant". Huber was promoted to "office assistant" and, by 1926, joined the political police department. In January 1928, Huber was made a "police assistant" and later a police inspector. During the years of the Weimar Republic, he worked with Heinrich Müller, then chief of the political department of the Munich police. Huber was involved in the suppression of the Nazi Party, communists, and other political groups.

== Nazi career ==
In 1933, Reichsführer-SS Heinrich Himmler became chief of the Munich Police, and Reinhard Heydrich was commander of Department IV, the Bavarian Political Police. Heydrich did not dismiss Huber, Müller or Josef Albert Meisinger as he perceived correctly that these men were thorough professionals and Heydrich needed such men in the national police service. Heydrich was appointed chief of the Gestapo on 22 April 1934. Immediately thereafter, Heydrich transferred to the Berlin office of the Gestapo, and took with him: Müller, Meisinger and Huber, referred to as the Bajuwaren-Brigade (Bavarian Brigade). Thereafter, in 1937, Huber joined the Nazi Party as member number: 4,583,151 and joined the SS with number 107,099.

=== Blomberg-Fritsch affair ===
In early 1938, Adolf Hitler, Hermann Göring and Himmler wanted to dispose of Field Marshal Werner von Blomberg, a conservative member of the army's high command and Hitler's Minister of War. Meisinger's investigation revealed that Blomberg's wife, Erna Gruhn, had been a prostitute with a police record and once posed for pornographic photos. Blomberg was forced to resign.

In 1936, Meisinger uncovered allegations of homosexuality made against the Commander-in-Chief of the Army Colonel General Werner von Fritsch. A file was prepared, and Heydrich passed the information on to Hitler. Hitler chose to dismiss the allegations and ordered Heydrich to destroy the file. However, he did not do so. In late January 1938, Göring wanted to dispose of von Fritsch, as he did not want Fritsch to become the successor to Blomberg and thus his superior. Heydrich resurrected the old file on Fritsch. Meisinger at the time was in charge of Bekämpfung der Homosexualität und der Abtreibung ("Campaign against Homosexuality and Abortion") Huber and Meisinger led the investigation against Fritsch. At one point, Huber and Meisinger interrogated Otto Schmidt, a notorious criminal whose Berlin gang had specialized in blackmail of homosexuals. Schmidt identified Fritsch as a homosexual. Heydrich resubmitted the updated von Fritsch file to Hitler. It was eventually determined that von Fritsch had been confused with a Rittmeister von Frisch. The accusations against Fritsch broke down, and Schmidt's record was revealed. Hitler, in the end, had Fritsch transferred, but there was a fallout from the investigation. Meisinger's career in the Gestapo was almost terminated, and Huber was transferred to Vienna in 1938. Huber remained good friends with Heinrich Müller, who was appointed Gestapo chief on 27 September 1939.

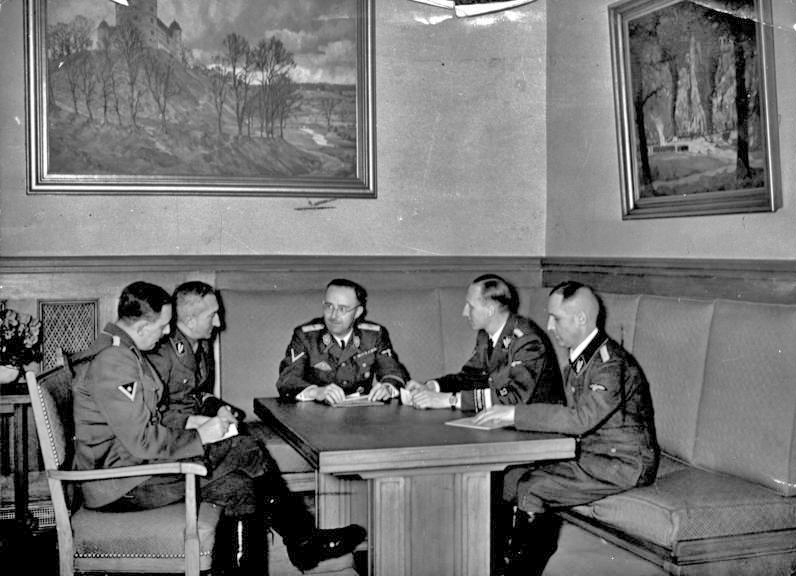
1939 photo: Shown left to right are Huber, Nebe (Kripo), Himmler, Heydrich and Müller planning the investigation of the Bürgerbräukeller assassination attempt on Adolf Hitler.

=== The Elser investigation ===
Johann Georg Elser, a German craftsman from Königsbronn, chose the anniversary of the Beer Hall Putsch in 1939, to kill Hitler with a bomb during his speech inside the Bürgerbräukeller. Elser hollowed out the pillar behind the speaker's rostrum and placed the bomb inside it. On 8 November 1939, the bomb exploded at 21:20, but Hitler had already left the room thirteen minutes earlier. Elser was arrested when he tried to cross into Switzerland. Elser was transferred to Munich, where he was interrogated by the Gestapo. After his confession to the crime, Elser was taken to the Berlin headquarters of the Gestapo, where he was tortured. Himmler wanted an in-depth investigation of the matter as he was unconvinced Elser acted alone. Huber was put in charge of the investigation and reported on it to Müller. Himmler was convinced that two known British SIS agents were involved in the attempt to assassinate Hitler at the Bürgerbräukeller. British SIS agents, Captain Sigismund Payne Best and Major Richard Henry Stevens were captured in what became known as the Venlo Incident. However, Huber's investigation found that neither SIS agent was involved.

=== Vienna ===
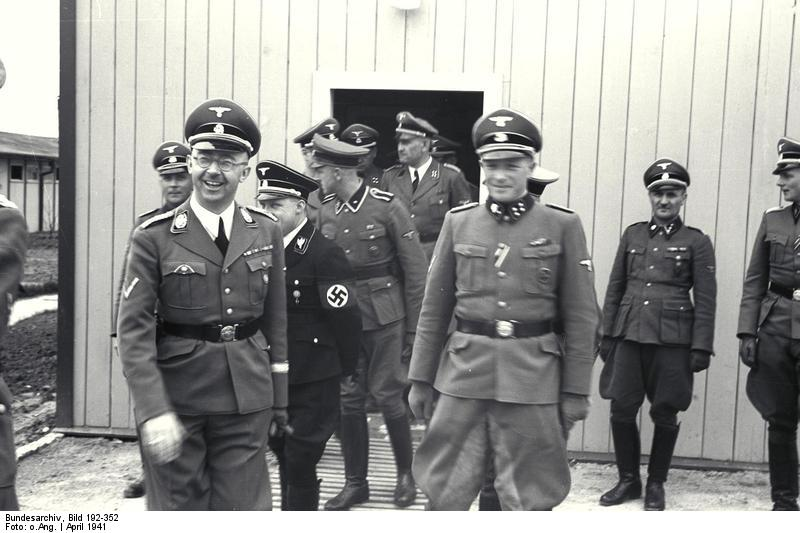
Franz Josef Huber (in doorway) with Heinrich Himmler, August Eigruber and other SS officers, at Mauthausen-Gusen concentration camp, June 1941.

In March 1938, after the annexation of Austria into the German Reich, Huber was appointed head of the state police, as Inspekteur der Sicherheitspolizei und des SD for Wehrkreis (military district) XVII, which comprised the Reichsgaue Vienna, Lower Danube and Upper Danube. He worked out of the Hotel Metropole, which was transformed into Gestapo headquarters in Vienna in April 1938. With a staff of 900 (80 per cent of whom were recruited from the Austrian police), it was the largest Gestapo office outside of Berlin. An estimated 50,000 people were interrogated or tortured there. Huber was also the formal chief of the Central Agency for Jewish Emigration in Vienna, and although the de facto leaders were Adolf Eichmann and later Alois Brunner, he was nevertheless responsible for the mass deportations of Jews. During the war, upwards of 70,000 Austrian Jews were murdered, almost 40 per cent of the pre-war community.

In addition, Huber was a political adviser to the Gauleiter of Vienna, Baldur von Schirach, and was also his representative as Reich Defense Commissioner for Military District XVII. Huber functioned as the permanent deputy to the Higher SS and Police Leader "Donau" who commanded all SS and police forces in Military District XVII. As the Inspekteur der Grenzpolizei (border police) for the military districts XVII and XVIII, Huber was responsible for controlling border security and surveillance with Slovakia, Hungary, Yugoslavia, Italy and Switzerland. In late autumn 1944 as the Red Army forces were approaching Austria, Ernst Kaltenbrunner designated Huber as Befehlshaber der Sicherheitspolizei und des SD for Military District XVII. Huber was a recipient of the War Merit Cross, second class and first class with swords.

== Post-war ==
By war's end, Huber was arrested. After a denazification trial in 1949, he was classified as a "lesser offender". He was fined 500 Deutsche Marks and placed on probation for one year, but did not serve any time in prison, and returned to his home town. The US Central Intelligence Agency's shielding of Huber was part of a larger U.S. program that recruited at least a thousand Nazi spies and concealed their Nazi past for decades, even, in many cases, from the U.S. Department of Justice. He was employed by the West German Federal Intelligence Service from 1955–64, and attempts by various survivor groups and the Austrian government to have him prosecuted for his wartime activities were blocked by the US occupation and intelligence authorities. He retired in 1967 and received a civil service pension. Huber died on 30 January 1975 in Munich.

== See also ==
- Glossary of Nazi Germany
- List of Nazi Party leaders and officials
- List of SS personnel
