= Dirk Klop =

Dutch military intelligence officer (1906-1939)

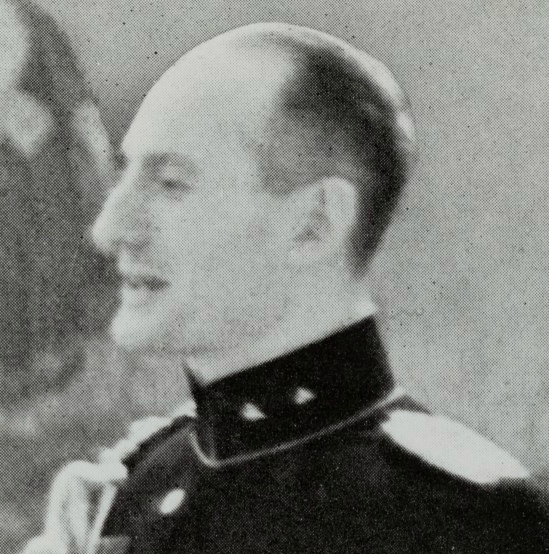
- Klop in 1939
- Born: 17 July 1906; Nieuw-Helvoet, Netherlands
- Died: 9 November 1939 (aged 33); Düsseldorf, Nazi Germany
- Spouse: Josephina Hermans
- Military career
- Allegiance: Netherlands
- Branch: Royal Netherlands Army
- Service years: 1925–1939
- Rank: Lieutenant
- Incidents: Venlo incident

Dirk Klop (17 July 1906 – 9 November 1939) was a Dutch Army intelligence officer who is known for his role in the Venlo incident.

== Venlo incident ==
Klop was born in Nieuw-Helvoet in South Holland, and lived for a time in Canada. In 1939, he was serving as a lieutenant with the Netherlands army general staff at The Hague, under Bert Sas who was the Netherlands military attaché in Berlin. On 9 November 1939, posing as a British Army captain under the assumed name "Coppins", he travelled to the café Backus near the town of Venlo, close to the German border. In the Buick car with him and Dutch driver Jan Lemmens were two British agents, Captain Sigismund Payne Best and Major Richard Henry Stevens.

Their objective was a promised meeting with a German general who was a leader of the German resistance to Hitler, following on from three previous meetings with what they believed were more junior officers opposed to Hitler, one of whom was in fact Walter Schellenberg of the Reich Central Security Office.

Immediately upon arrival a convertible car full of German special agents led by Alfred Naujocks of the Sicherheitsdienst drew up in front of their own vehicle, and one of the occupants opened fire. Klop returned fire with a revolver, but was then mortally wounded by a burst of submachine gun fire. Best and Stevens surrendered and they were all taken across the border into Germany where Klop died of his wounds at Protestant Hospital, Düsseldorf.

Adolf Hitler justified his later invasion of the Netherlands partly by citing the complicity of the Dutch with the British Secret Service that was revealed by this incident.
