= Löwenbräukeller =

Beer hall in Germany

Coordinates: 48°08′52″N 11°33′30″E

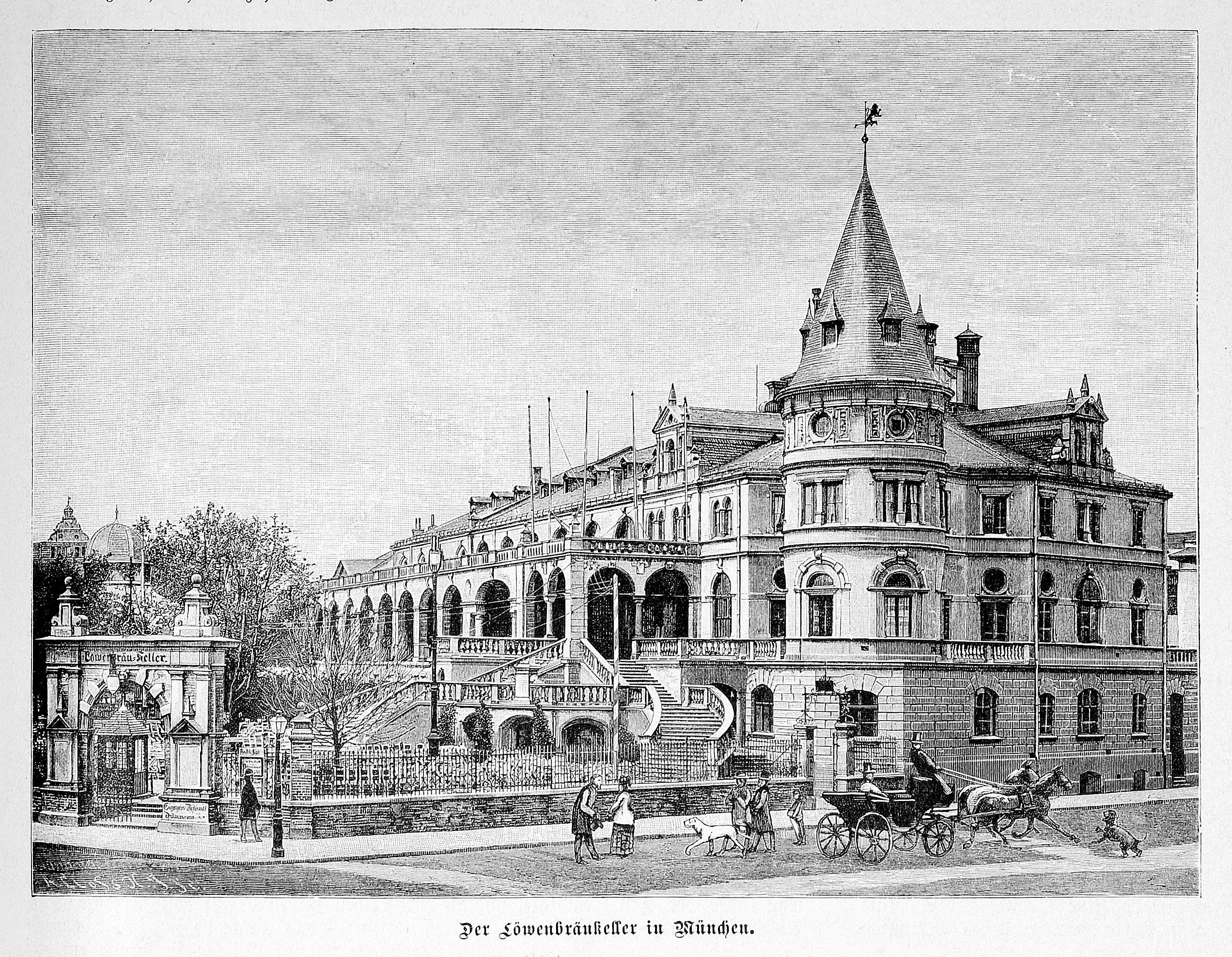
Löwenbräukeller around 1888, from Die Gartenlaube

Löwenbräukeller ([ˈløːvn̩.bʁɔʏ.ˌkɛ.lɐ]; "Löwenbräu (Lion Brew) cellar") is a beer hall and event center located in Maxvorstadt, Munich, Bavaria, Germany. It has hosted concerts by artists such as Def Leppard, Ozzy Osbourne and Kiss.

It was used as a substitute site for the anniversaries of the 1923 Beer Hall Putsch, after a 1939 assassination attempt on Adolf Hitler by Georg Elser rendered the original site, the nearby Bürgerbräukeller unusable.

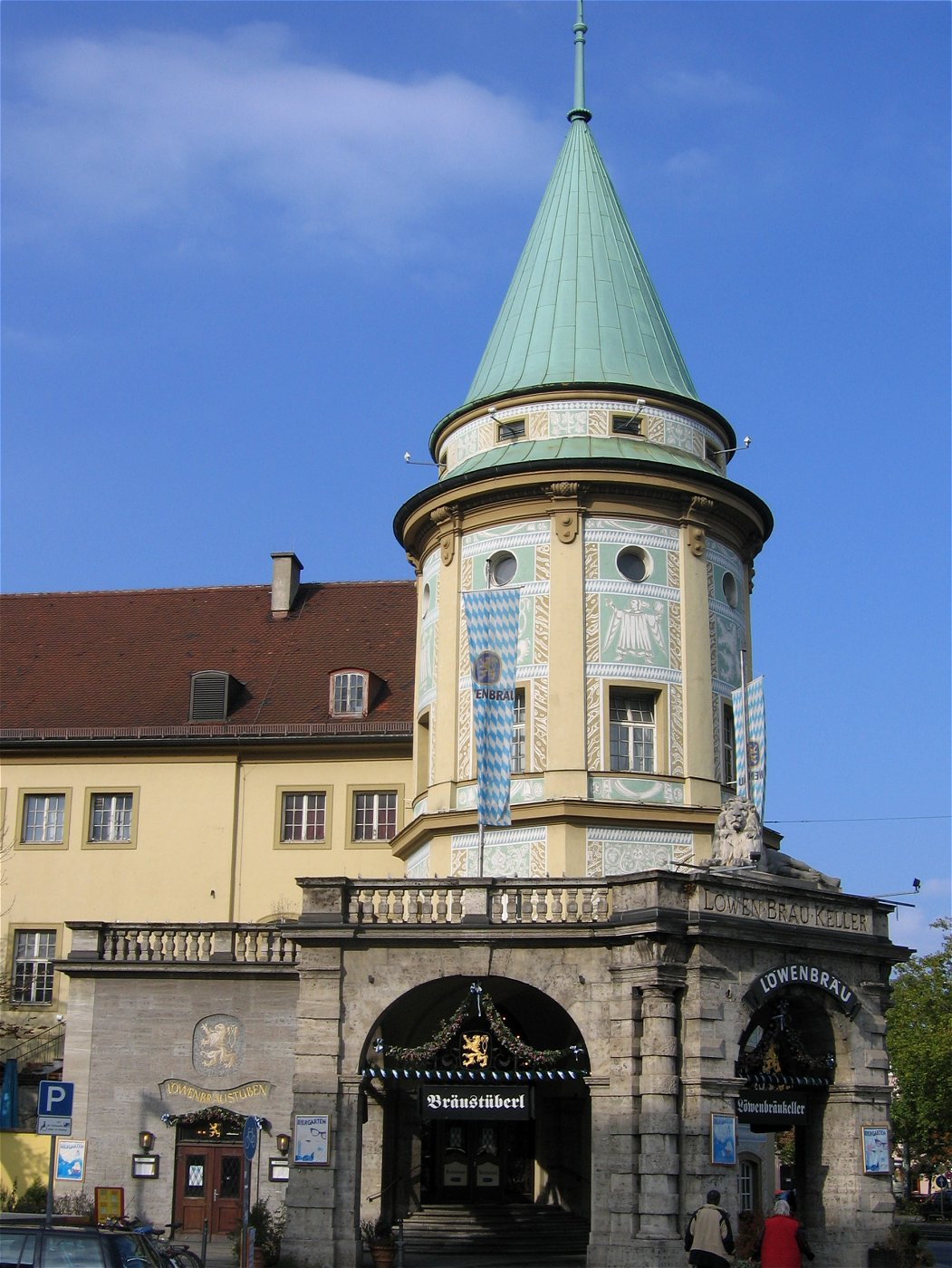
Löwenbräukeller, 2007

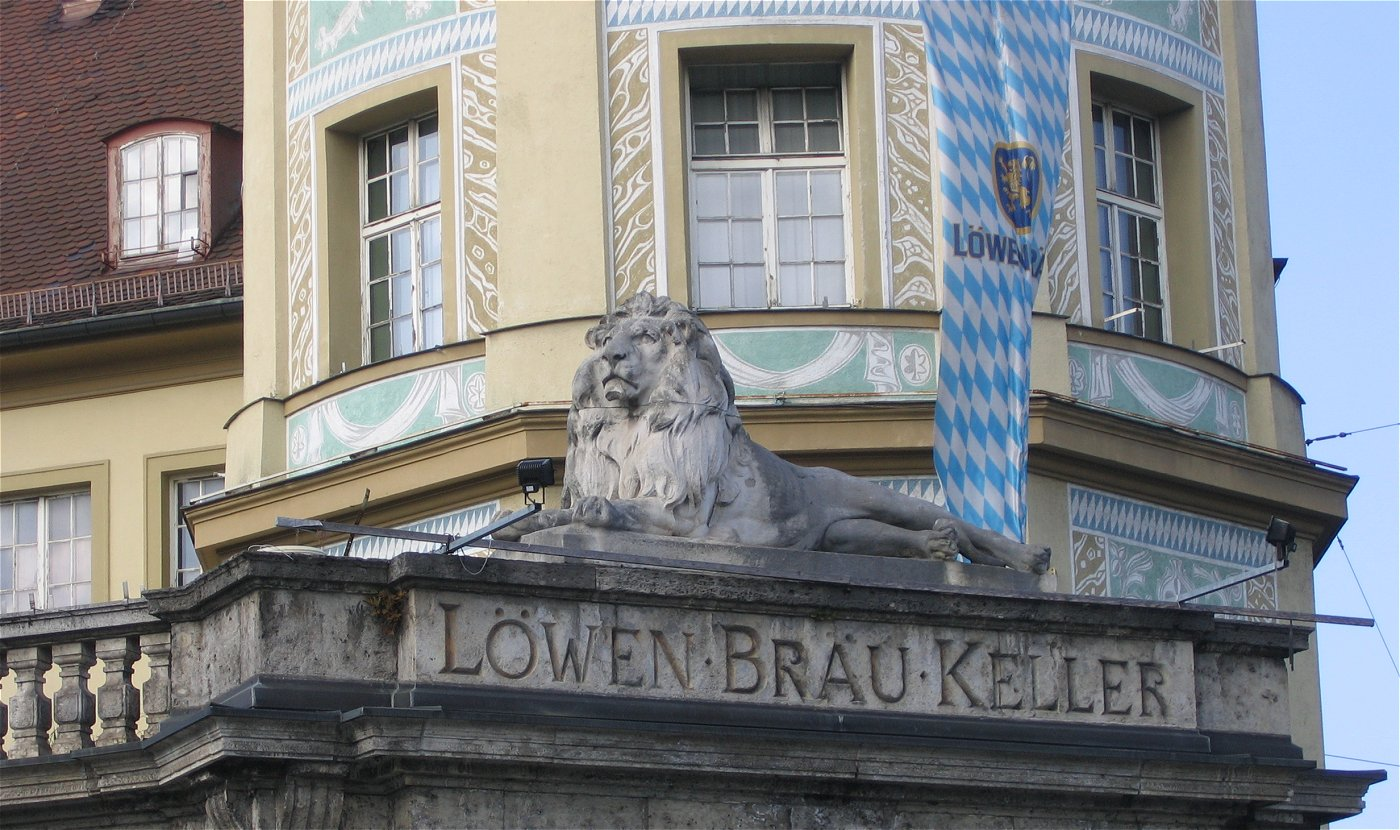
Lion by Wilhelm von Rümann
