= Venlo incident =

1939 Nazi capture of British MI6 agents

Coordinates: 51°22′54.74″N 6°13′1.21″E

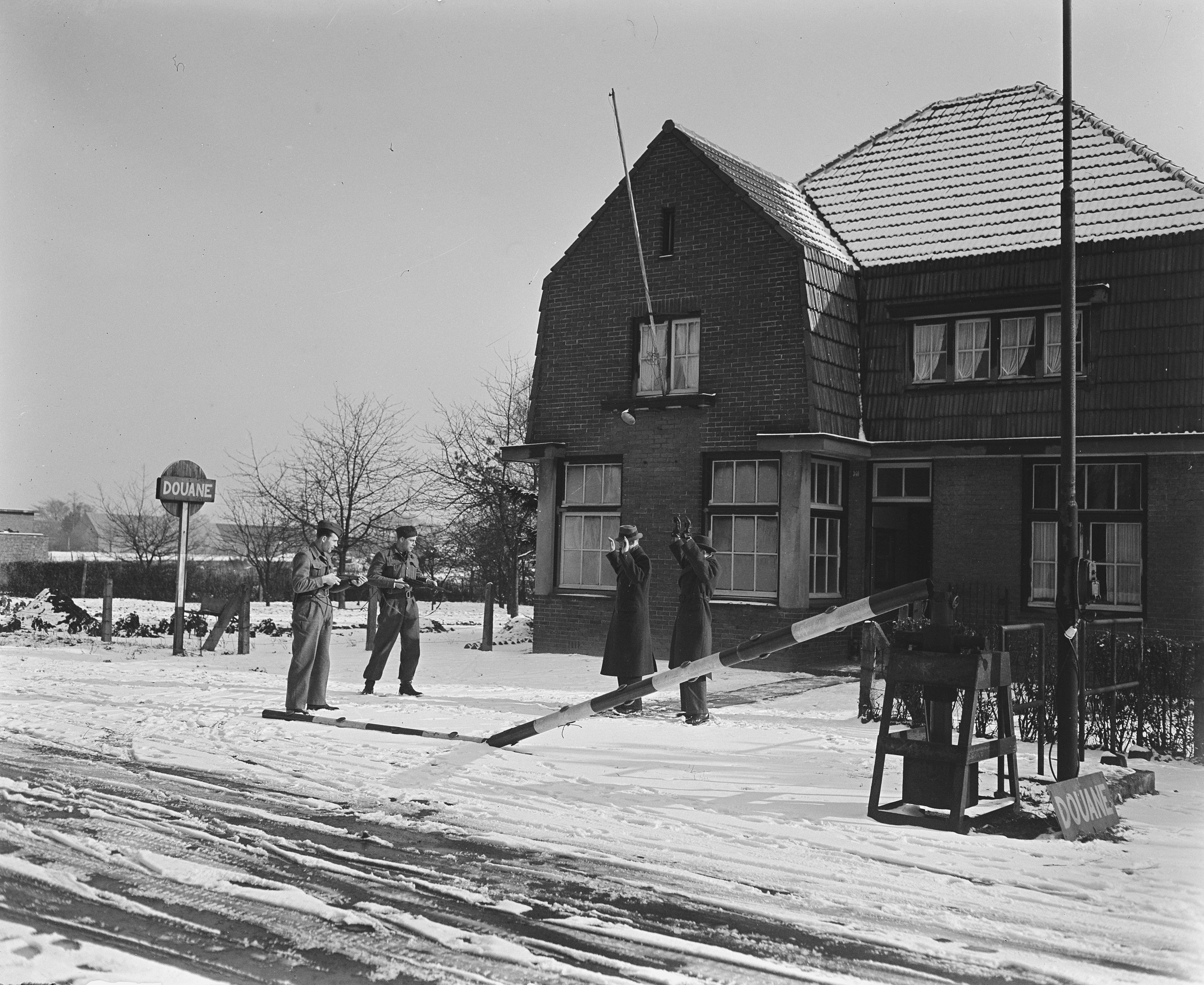
- Reconstruction of the incident in 1948
- Date: 9 November 1939
- Location: Five metres (16 ft) from the German border, near Venlo, the Netherlands
- Type: Diplomatic incident
- Participants: British Secret Intelligence Service and German Sicherheitsdienst
- Outcome: British spy network in central and western Europe rendered practically useless
- Deaths: 1

The Venlo incident was a covert operation carried out by the German Nazi Party's Sicherheitsdienst (SD) on 9 November 1939, which resulted in the capture of two British Secret Intelligence Service agents five metres (16 ft) from the German border, on the outskirts of the Dutch city of Venlo.

The incident was later used by the German government to link Britain to Georg Elser's failed assassination attempt on Adolf Hitler at the Bürgerbräukeller in Munich, on 8 November 1939, and to help justify Germany's invasion of the Netherlands (then a neutral country) on 10 May 1940.

== Background ==
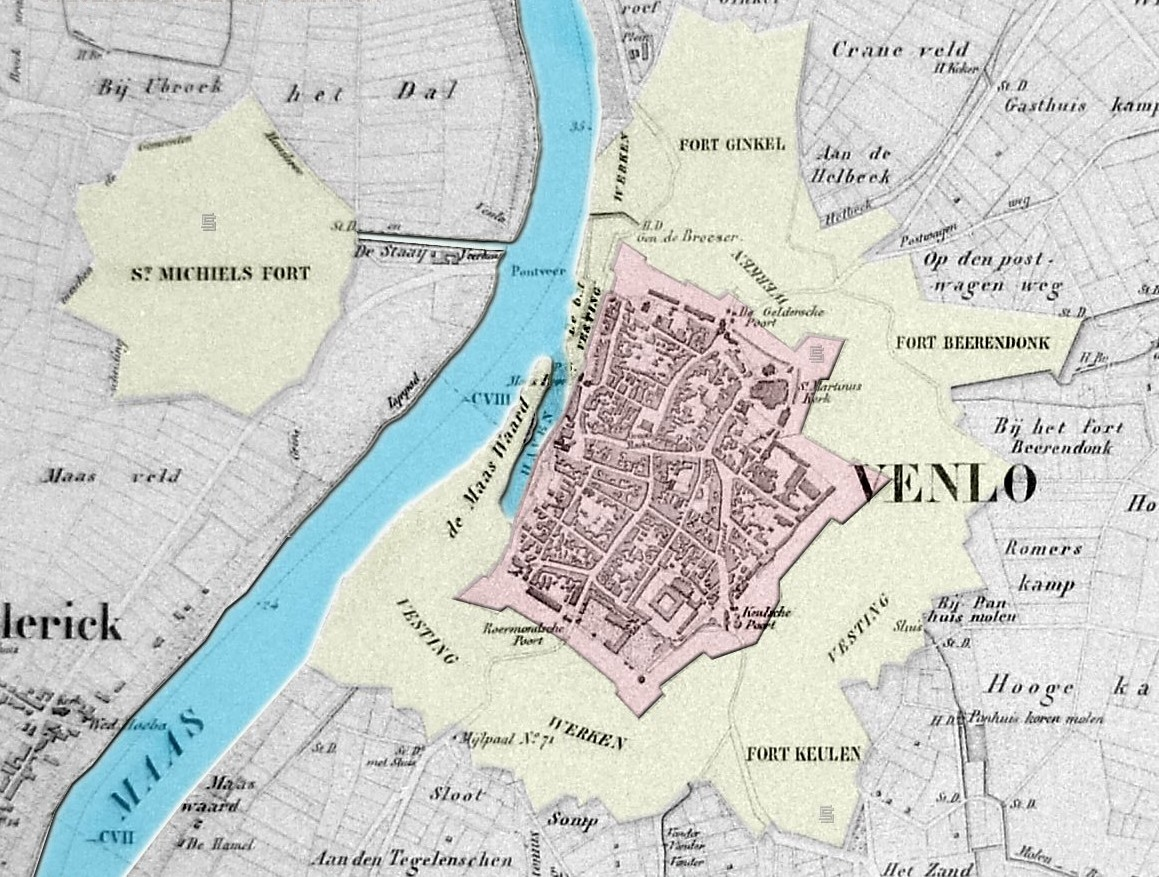
Map of the city of Venlo, on the river Meuse, in 1850

After the British declaration of war on Nazi Germany on 3 September 1939, British Prime Minister Neville Chamberlain was still interested in seeking a compromise peace with Germany before too much blood had been spilt. The British Government was well aware of the existence of widespread opposition among the leaders of the German Army.

During the autumn of 1939, the German opposition was extending feelers to the British government. In October, Munich lawyer Josef Müller contacted the British through the Vatican with the connivance of Colonel Hans Oster. Theodor Kordt, the younger brother of Erich, pursued similar objectives in Bern.

The Swedish industrialist Birger Dahlerus tried to establish peace through an early form of shuttle diplomacy, partly performed on Dutch soil. And in early October the Dutch ambassador in Ankara, Philips Christiaan Visser, was communicating peace proposals on the line of the Dahlerus proposals, made by Hitler's former deputy chancellor and then ambassador to Turkey, Franz von Papen, to the British ambassador Sir Hughe Knatchbull-Hugessen.

All diplomatic efforts to avoid a Second World War in Europe during the days preceding the German invasion of Poland in September 1939 had come to nothing. So when a German refugee named Fischer succeeded in winning the confidence of the exiled German Catholic leader, Karl Spiecker, a British intelligence informant in the Netherlands, the British SIS became interested in the information Fischer was offering.

== Covert meetings ==
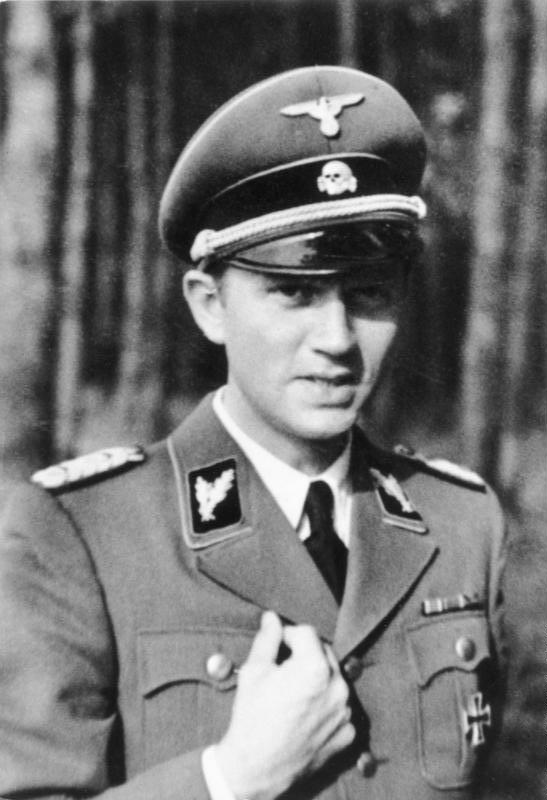
Walter Schellenberg

In early September 1939, a meeting was arranged between Fischer and the British SIS agent Captain Sigismund Payne Best. Best was an experienced intelligence officer who worked under the cover of a businessman residing in The Hague with his Dutch wife.

Subsequent meetings included Major Richard Henry Stevens, a less-experienced intelligence operative who was working covertly for the British SIS as the passport control officer in The Hague. To assist Best and Stevens in passing through the Dutch mobilised zones near the border with Germany, a young Dutch Army officer, Lieutenant Dirk Klop, was recruited by Chief of the Dutch Military Intelligence, Major General Johan van Oorschot. Klop was permitted by Van Oorschot to sit in on covert meetings but could not take part because of his country's neutrality.

At the early meetings Fischer brought participants who were posing as German officers who supported a plot against Hitler, and who were interested in establishing Allied peace terms if Hitler was deposed. When Fischer's success in setting up the meetings with the British agents became known, Sturmbannführer Walter Schellenberg of the Foreign Intelligence section of the Sicherheitsdienst began to attend these meetings. Masquerading as a "Hauptmann Schämmel", Schellenberg was at the time a trusted operative of Heinrich Himmler and was in close contact with Reinhard Heydrich during the Venlo operation.

At the last meeting between the British SIS agents and the German SD officers on 8 November, Schellenberg promised to bring a general to the meeting on the following day. Instead, the Germans brought the talks to an abrupt end with the kidnapping of Best and Stevens.

== Press reports ==
The Venlo Incident was first reported in the British Press on 10 November 1939, as follows:

ONE DUTCHMAN KILLED AND SEVERAL WOUNDED

I Shooting Affray Follows Clash With German Officials.

OMINOUS BORDER INCIDENT Amsterdam, Thursday---One man was shot dead and a number of Dutchmen were kidnapped and taken into Germany after an amazing incident at Venlo, on the Dutch-German frontier this evening, following an armed clash between German Officials and Dutchmen. A German motor car crossed the frontier when a Dutch car was approaching the Dutch barrier, ten yards from the German customs House. It is presumed that the Germans wanted to continue their journey into Holland [sic] in the Dutch car. German officials and Customs officers, partly uniformed and all armed, ran across the Dutch frontier menacing Dutch onlookers, and ordered customers at the nearby café to move inside from the windows. A wild shooting affray followed, and one man, believed to be a Dutchman in the Dutch car, was killed, the body being dragged back into Germany. Several other Dutchmen who were in the car were likewise kidnapped, and, with their car, hauled into German territory.

The Dutch authorities have ordered an immediate Inquiry.

While the British press were unaware that two British SIS agents were involved in the border incident, Sir Alexander Cadogan, Permanent Under-Secretary for Foreign Affairs, was aware, as he recorded in his diary:

- November 10. Our men, who met, or were to have met, Gen[eral] yesterday, bumped off on Dutch-German frontier. Discussed matter with H. [Lord Halifax] and Menzies [Stewart Menzies]. ... Numerous reports of imminent invasion of Holland.

=== Chronology ===
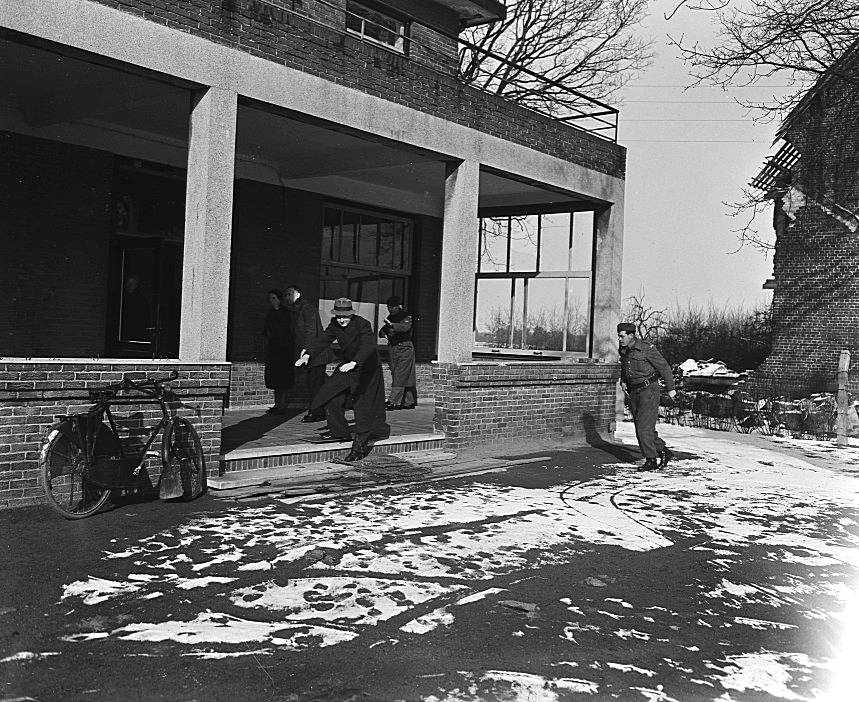
Reconstruction of the incident in 1948

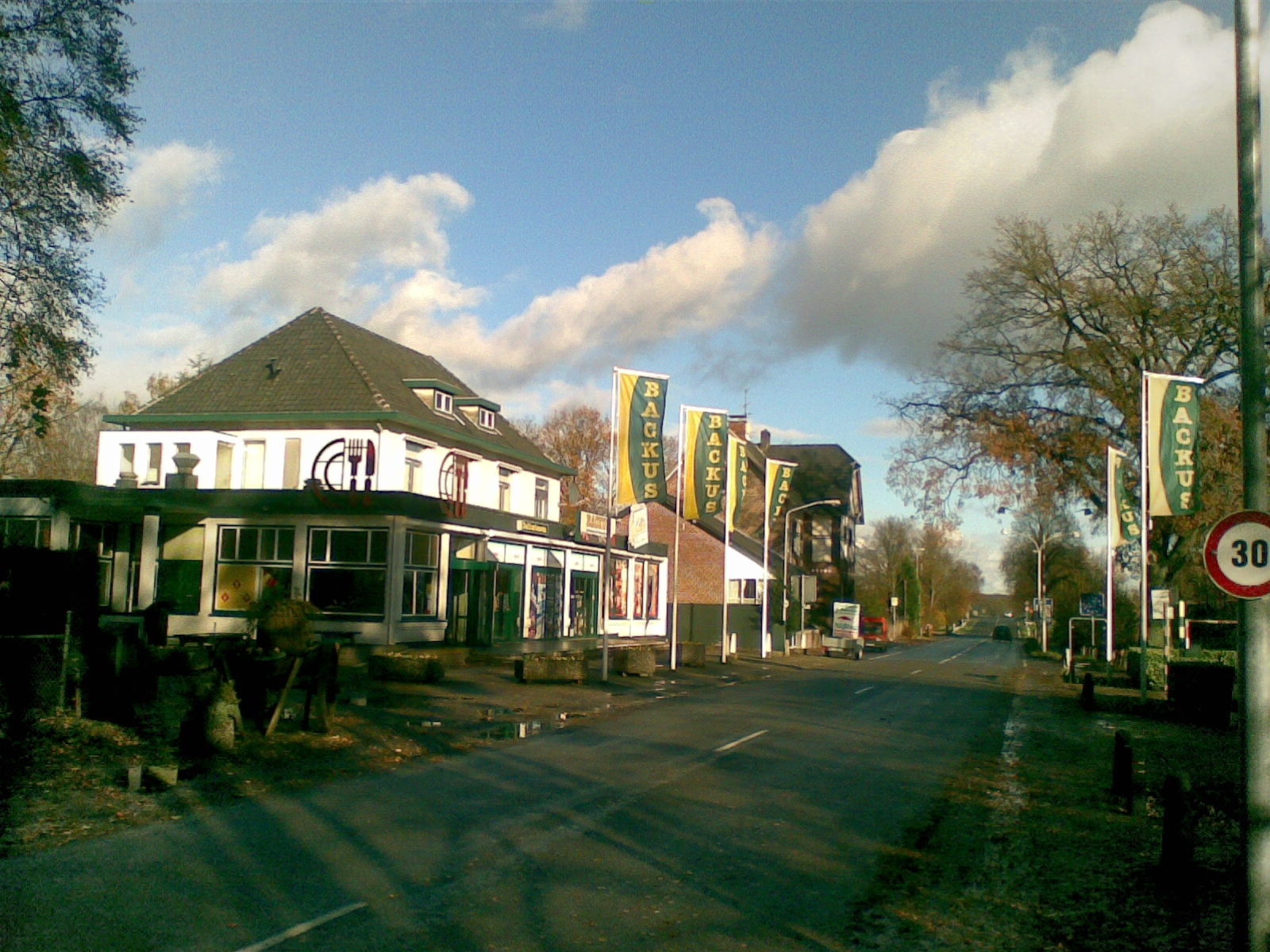
Cafe Backus with the German border in the background

The covert meetings leading up to the kidnapping, as remembered by Captain S. Payne Best in his book The Venlo Incident, are summarised below.

1. Best met with Fischer at an unspecified location in the Netherlands at the beginning of September 1939.
2. At the second meeting, Fischer brought a Major Solms to meet Best. Best believed that Solm was a major in the Luftwaffe. They met at a small hotel in the town of Venlo. (Date unspecified)
3. Best met with Fischer and Major Solms a week later. (Location and date unspecified) Solm told Best there was a conspiracy to remove Hitler from power in which some of the highest-ranking officers of the Wehrmacht were involved. Solms could give no further details as the 'ringleaders' would deal directly only with Best. However, before they would meet, they required certainty that Best was a bona fide British agent and requested that he arrange for a certain paragraph to be broadcast in the German News Bulletin of the BBC. That was done twice on 11 October, about the same day that Best was informed by Major Solms he feared he was being watched by the Gestapo and needed to 'lie low'.
4. On 20 October, together with Fischer, Major Stevens and Lieutenant Klop, Best met with two German officers, Captain von Seidlitz and Lieutenant Grosch, in a private house that was owned by a friend of Best in Arnhem. The meeting was interrupted by Dutch police and little progress was made. 'The two Huns seemed scared out of their wits and it was very difficult to get anything out of them except that they wanted to go home', Best recalled.
5. On 30 October, Best, Major Stevens and Lieutenant Klop met with three German officers: Lieutenant Grosch, Colonel Martini and Major Schaemmel at The Hague. (Klop had collected the three Germans near Dinxperlo after they were arrested by Dutch police near the frontier.) Schaemmel, speaking for the Germans, outlined current conditions in Germany and the losses of men and material in the Polish campaign and how it was imperative the war be ended quickly. Schaemmel went on to say Hitler would not take advice from his General Staff and needed to be got rid of, but his assassination would lead to chaos. The intention was to take him prisoner and force him to give orders authorising a junta of officers to start negotiations for peace. 'We are Germans and have to think of the interests of our own country first. Before we take any steps against Hitler we want to know whether England and France are ready to grant us a peace which is both just and honourable', Best recollects Schaemmel saying at the meeting. To facilitate further dialogue, a wireless transmitting and receiving set was given to the Germans. Stevens referred Schaemmel's question to London, and a day or two later, a noncommittal reply came back. More messages were exchanged on a daily basis by wireless before another meeting was arranged.
6. On 7 November, Best, Major Stevens, Lieutenant Klop met with two German officers: Lieutenant Grosch and Major Schaemmel. Klop was instrumental in holding the meeting in the Cafe Backus, on the outskirts of Venlo, as the venue better suited the Germans, as it was close to the border crossing. Best and Stevens gave the Germans a verbal résumé of London's answers to their questions. Though the answers appeared not to come up to their expectations, the Germans said they would pass them on to their 'chief' and proposed a meeting with him the next day, as he was anxious to entrust 'secret papers' to Best and Stevens for safekeeping if the plot against Hitler failed.
7. On 8 November, Best, Major Stevens and Lieutenant Klop met only with Schaemmel at the Cafe Backus. Schaemmel said the general, who was to have come, had been called by Hitler to urgent meeting in Munich to consider an appeal for peace made by the Queen of the Netherlands and the King of Belgium. Schaemmel asked Best and Stevens to meet again on the following day at the same venue to enable the general to be present, adding that as an 'attempt' against Hitler was to be made on Saturday, the next day would be the last chance for a meeting.
8. On 9 November, the meeting was planned for 16:00. As for the last meeting, Klop arranged for a Dutch police guard to be present at the border. Unlike previous meetings, Best and Stevens armed themselves with Browning automatics in case something went wrong.

=== Aliases ===
- Fischer was known to Best as Dr Franz, a German refugee. According to Martin A. Allen, Fischer's real name was Morz, a former follower of Otto Strasser, who was coerced by threat of death to be an agent of the SD (Agent F479).
- Major Schämmel was the alias of Walter Schellenberg, as stated above.
- Major Solms was the alias of Johannes Travaglio, a German major in Division 1 (Air Reconnaissance) of the Abwehr in Munich, the head of which was a close collaborator and friend of Admiral Wilhelm Canaris.
- Colonel Martini was the alias of Dr. Max de Crinis, an SS officer involved in the euthanasia program "mercy killing", in the Central Tiergartenstraße 4, in 1939–1941.
- Captain von Seidlitz was the alias of SS-Sturmbannführer von Salish, a long-serving SD officer trusted by Walter Schellenberg
- Lieutenant Grosch was the alias of SS-Hauptsturmführer Christian, a long-serving SD officer trusted by Walter Schellenberg.
- Lieutenant Klop was given the name of Captain Coppens by Best and Stevens to pass him off as a British officer.

== Capture of British agents ==
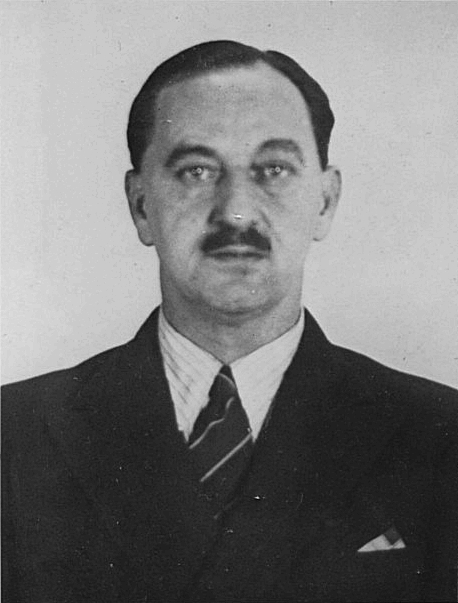
Richard H. Stevens, 1939

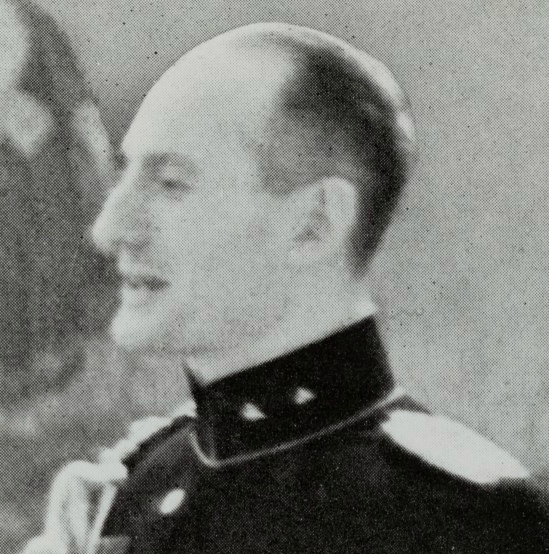
Luitenant Dirk Klop

Early on 9 November 1939, Schellenberg received orders from Himmler to abduct the British SIS agents, Best and Stevens. SS-Sonderkommandos under the operations command of SD man Alfred Naujocks, carried out the orders. Best drove his car into the car park at the Cafe Backus for the meeting planned for 16:00 with Schellenberg. Stevens was sitting beside him while Dirk Klop and Klop's driver, Jan Lemmens, sat in the back seat.

Before Best had time to get out of the car, Naujocks' SD men arrived. In a brief shootout, Klop was mortally wounded. After being handcuffed and stood against a wall, Best and Stevens, together with Jan Lemmens, were bundled into the SD car. Klop was put into Best's car and both cars were driven off over the border into Germany. Best recalled a full body search was performed on him when they reached Düsseldorf en route to Berlin. At Düsseldorf, one of the men who had taken part in the kidnapping told Best the reason for the action was to catch some Germans plotting against the Führer, who were responsible for the attempt on his life the night earlier. Klop was admitted to the Protestant Hospital in Düsseldorf. A doctor on duty recalled years later Klop was unconscious when he was admitted and died the same day from a gunshot wound to the head. On 29 December 1939 Klop was embalmed under the false name of Thomas Kremp, a communist; his remains were cremated and buried under a false name in the Düsseldorf cemetery in an unknown grave.

== Georg Elser connection ==
Prior to the assassination attempt at the Bürgerbräukeller in Munich on 8 November, Naujocks and his squad had been sent to Düsseldorf to support Schellenberg. Even before his private train had returned from Munich to Berlin, Hitler ordered the British SIS officers in the Netherlands be brought to Berlin for questioning. Himmler issued the order to Schellenberg early in the morning on 9 November.

Though Georg Elser, a suspect being interrogated in Munich by the Gestapo, insisted he had acted alone, Hitler recognized the propaganda value of the assassination attempt as a means to incite German public resentment against Britain. On 21 November, Hitler declared he had incontrovertible proof that the British Secret Service was behind the Munich bombing and that two British agents had been arrested near the Dutch border. The next day, German newspapers carried the story. The front page of the Deutsche Allgemeine Zeitung had pictures of the conspirators named as Georg Elser, 'Kaptain Stevens' and 'Mr Best'.

== Aftermath ==
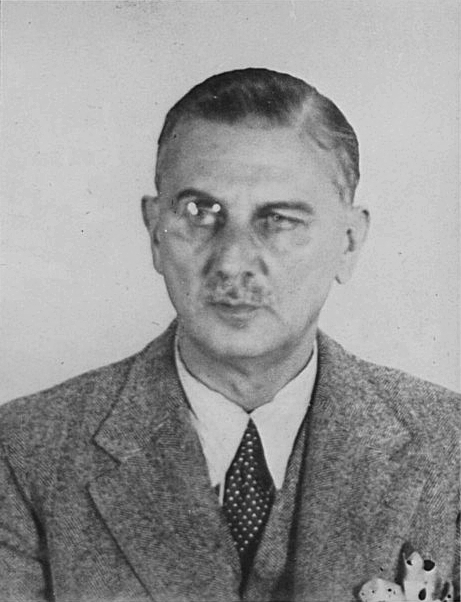
Sigismund P. Best, 1939

The Nazi press reported that the Gestapo had tricked the British Secret Service into carrying on radio contact for 21 days after Best and Stevens were abducted using the radio transmitter given to them. Himmler is accredited to quipping, 'After a while it became boring to converse with such arrogant and foolish people'.

The British Foreign Office believed that Himmler was involved in the secret Anglo-German contact of autumn 1939, and that the discussions, involving prime minister, Neville Chamberlain, and the foreign secretary, Lord Halifax, were bona fide peace negotiations. Historian Callum MacDonald shared this view.

The damage inflicted on Britain's espionage network in Europe caused the new prime minister, Winston Churchill, to start his own spy and sabotage agency, the Special Operations Executive in 1940. The incident exposed the fact that the Chamberlain government was still seeking a deal with Germany while it was exhorting the nation to a supreme war effort. That outraged Churchill to the extent that he was against providing support to German opposition to Hitler for the rest of the war.

Hitler used the incident to claim that the Netherlands had violated its own neutrality. The presence of Klop, a Dutch agent, whose signature on his personal papers was gratefully misused by the Germans, provided sufficient "proof of cooperation between British and Dutch secret services, and justify an invasion of The Netherlands by Germany in May, 1940".

Naujocks was awarded the Iron Cross by Hitler the day after the kidnapping. Schellenberg gave evidence against other Nazis at the Nuremberg Trials. He died in 1952, at age 42.

== Fate of British agents ==
After interrogation at the Gestapo Prinz-Albrecht-Strasse headquarters in Berlin, Best and Stevens were sent to Sachsenhausen concentration camp. Both were held in isolation in the T-shaped building reserved for protected prisoners of the Gestapo. While at Sachsenhausen, Best claimed he corresponded by secret letters with another protected prisoner, Georg Elser.

In January 1941, Stevens was moved from Sachsenhausen to the bunker at Dachau concentration camp, where he remained until evacuated with Best and other protected prisoners in April 1945. In February 1945, Best was transferred briefly to Buchenwald concentration camp and then to the 'bunker' at Dachau concentration camp on 9 April 1945. Coincidentally, that was the same day that Elser was executed at Dachau. On 24 April 1945, Best and Stevens left Dachau with 140 other protected high-profile prisoners in a convoy bound for South Tyrol. At the lakeside Prags Wildbad Hotel, near Niederdorf, they were liberated by the advancing US Army on 4 May 1945.
