= Bürgerliches Brauhaus =

Former brewery in Munich, Germany

Bürgerliches Brauhaus München Public Limited Company was a nineteenth-century large-scale brewery in Munich.

It came into existence in 1880, when the Zenger Brewery of the Hierl family was transformed into a public limited company. Its first managing directors were the brothers Georg and Carl Proebst, the latter being succeeded by Konrad Euler. First Brewery Inspectors and Master Brewers were Johann Baptist Kuttendreier and Ludwig Bauer.

On December 28, 1921, and effective September 1, 1920, the Bürgerliche Brauhaus was merged with Löwenbräu Public Limited Company. At that time, the company owned a brewery, a malthouse, four large beer halls and gardens (Bürgerbräukeller in München-Haidhausen, Restaurant "Bürgerbräu" in the Inner City of Munich, the Bürgerbräu Terraces in Pullach and in Menterschwaige) as well as the protected trademarks "Hellquell" und "Triumphator".
