= Sigismund Payne Best =

British intelligence agent (1885–1978)

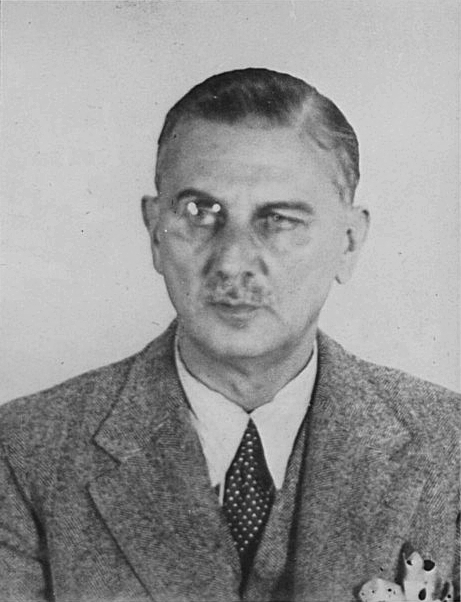
Captain Sigismund Payne Best, with monocle (1939)

Captain Sigismund Payne Best OBE (14 April 1885 – 21 September 1978) was a British Secret Intelligence Service agent during the First and Second World Wars. He was captured by German Gestapo and Sicherheitsdienst (SD) men on 9 November 1939 in the Venlo Incident.

== Early life ==
Born in Cheltenham, Gloucestershire, and raised at 26 Strawberry Hill Road, Twickenham, Middlesex, Best was the son of Downing College, Cambridge (B.A. 1871, M.B. 1878), and St George's Hospital-educated physician George Payne Best (1844-1907), M.R.C.S., and his wife Catherine Sophia (née Allison). His paternal grandmother was the daughter of an Indian maharajah and a British woman; this was kept a closely guarded family secret. After studying science in London, Best worked as a businessman. In 1908, he went to study violin at the Music Academy of Lausanne. He then studied economics and musicology at the Ludwig-Maximilians-Universität München, graduating in both in 1913. In Munich, he acquired an excellent knowledge of the German language. Back in England, he went as a volunteer into the army. His first wife, Dorothy Stallwood Adams, died in 1918.

== First World War intelligence work ==
Best served as a captain in the First World War; first as a member of the Intelligence Corps—owing partially to his poor eyesight and his command of French, German and Flemish—and later as the second officer of the GHQ's Wallinger London bureau. In 1917, Major Ernest Wallinger sent him to Rotterdam, Netherlands to handle and set up intelligence networks in German-occupied Belgium. The Wallinger service was linked to several Belgian resistance groups. A well-known recruit of Wallinger was the Belgian resistance heroine Gabrielle Petit. In Rotterdam, Best came into conflict with Richard Tinsley, local station chief of MI6. In November 1917, he was recalled to London after he was caught sleeping with the wife of an influential Belgian resistance leader. He was replaced by Lieutenant Ivone Kirkpatrick. Best later accused Tinsley of scheming against him.

Captain Best was appointed Officer of the Order of the British Empire (OBE) and awarded the Belgian Croix de Guerre.

== Life in the Netherlands ==
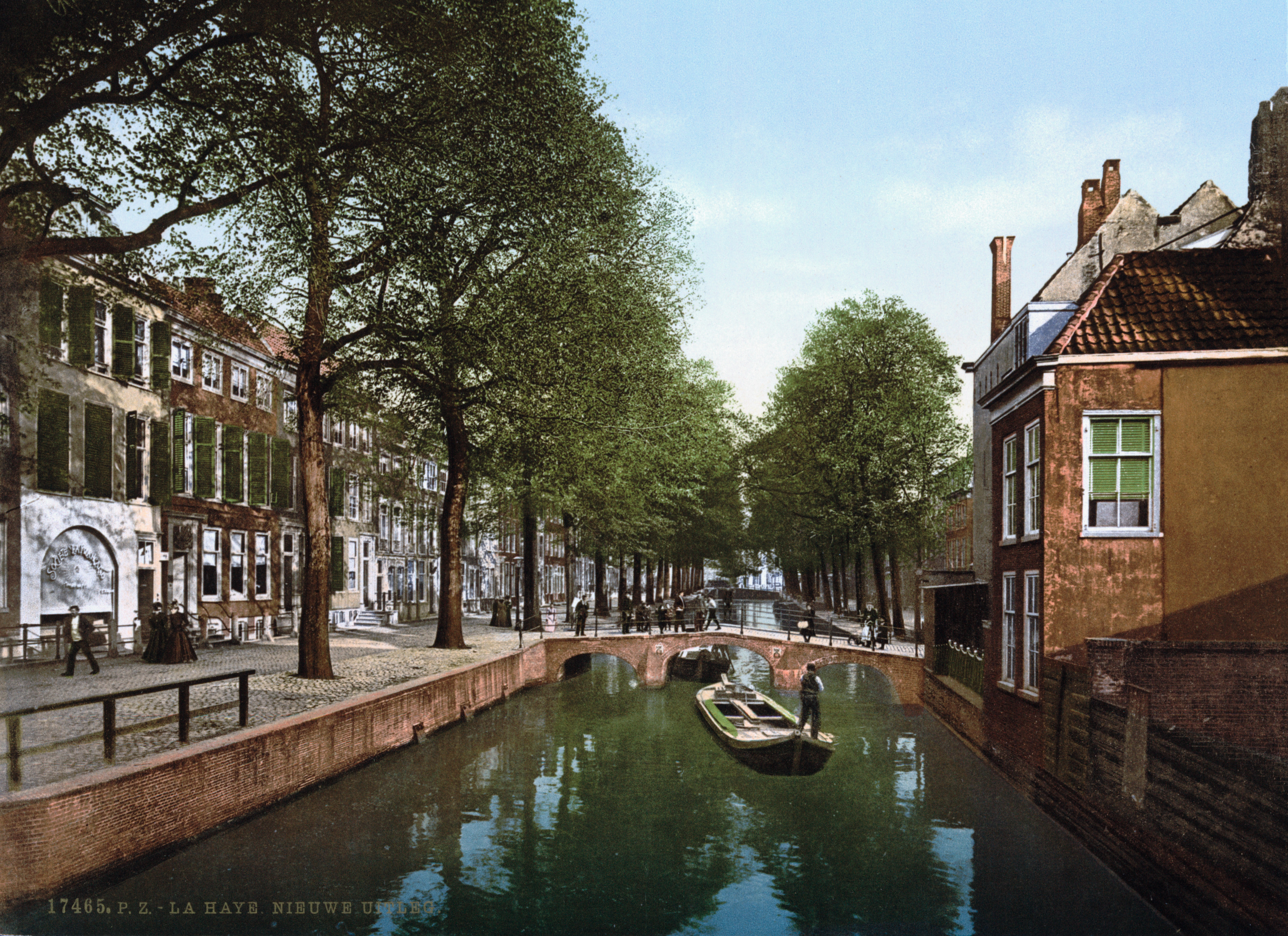
Nieuwe Uitleg: the street in The Hague where Best had his office in 1939

After his demobilisation in 1919, Best returned to the Netherlands, where he and his partner in business and intelligence, P.N. van der Willik, set up a British firm, called the Continental Trade Service, also called Pharmisan, a trading company, mainly in pharmaceutical products, and a consultancy agency for British businessmen. In 1919, he married Margaretha van Rees, a Dutch painter.

Living in a prime residential location in The Hague, he was known as a serious British businessman. Best's cover was a thin one. Although he was married to a Dutch wife, his tall figure, spats and monocle made him, in the eyes of many Dutchmen, the embodiment of a British spy. At times, he would think that it safe to confide that this presumption was wholly justified.

From 1938, he was a member of Haag'schen Golf Club and had good relations with the Dutch royal family. On Friday afternoons he regularly played music with his 'neighbors' Prince Hendrik, Duke of Mecklenburg-Schwerin and husband of Queen Wilhelmina. His wife, whom he called "May", was a relatively well known artist, and portrayed Queen Wilhelmina. In December 1938, he undertook with his wife May and his foster son Enzo Bonopera an extended trip to Germany, Switzerland and France.

== Second World War intelligence work ==
With war looming in 1938, Best was recruited into Claude Dansey's 'Z' organization, a new branch of the SIS. Best already knew Dansey, having served with him in the Netherlands in 1917. The Hague was an important place in the Z-network, Dansey having established the regional headquarters of his network in the two neutral countries where he had worked during the First World War: Netherlands and Switzerland.

Best's operations in the Netherlands stood at the crosswinds of a political storm. He had, on the orders of London but against all trade craft, combined his NOC operations with those of Major Richard Henry Stevens, a less-experienced operative who operated from the British Embassy as the head of a notional "Passport Control Office". The PCO (which, like Section Z, operated throughout Europe) was compromised before its operations were combined with those of Section Z, and thus it was a simple matter for the Germans to mount sting and counterintelligence operations against British agents throughout Europe.

A young Nazi lawyer, Walter Schellenberg, joined the SS in 1933. He met Reinhard Heydrich and went to work in the counter-intelligence department of the Sicherheitsdienst (SD). From 1939 to 1942, he was Reichsführer-SS Heinrich Himmler's personal aide and a deputy chief in the Reich Security Main Office under Heydrich who answered only to Himmler. In that capacity, he played a major role in a 1939 false flag operation against Stevens and Best.

Best, Stevens and Dutch Lieutenant Dirk Klop (pretending, for neutrality's sake, to be a British national) began a series of meetings, which, despite the Britons' misgivings about Fischer (an exiled German refugee that Dansey had ordered Payne to cultivate as an asset) and his putative friends (who, in fact, were all SD agents), culminated in what pretended to be an agreement to form, post-Hitler, a united German-British front against the Soviet Union. The agreement included a period in which Adolf Hitler would be kept as a figurehead, then a restoration of democracy and legal protection for Jewish citizens.

In London, Prime Minister Neville Chamberlain, having seen Hitler violate the Munich Agreement by seizing Czechoslovakia, was more than ready to foment a German coup. However, Best's suspicions that their German contacts might be double agents had been passed up the intelligence chain and the operatives were warned to stay away from the German border. In Britain, the top secret talks were seen by many – including the new First Lord of the Admiralty, Winston Churchill — as another Munich.

== Kidnapping ==
In any case, not only were the talks a complicated German bluff, but the entire operation was brought to an abrupt end. Himmler had decided, over Schellenberg's objections, to have the British operatives abducted; the attempt by Georg Elser to assassinate Hitler at the Bürgerbräukeller, believed by Himmler to be the result of British machinations, forced the matter. The next day, in a daring and violent abduction, Best and Stevens were kidnapped from the Café Backus on the outskirts of Venlo; Klop was fatally wounded in the shootout with German agents and rushed to Berlin. Under interrogation, Best and Stevens gave up detailed information on British espionage activities. Worse, Stevens was carrying on him a plaintext list of SIS agents in Europe.

== Imprisonment ==
Best was imprisoned at the Sachsenhausen detention camp between 1940 and 1945, and for a few months of 1945, in the Dachau concentration camp. Fluent in German and having the protection of the Gestapo, he was able to make life in Sachsenhausen as palatable as he could, collecting a good wardrobe of clothes, a library of books and a radio to keep himself informed with the progress of the war.

During his imprisonment, he came into contact with a number of famous figures, including not only Elser, but also the famed theologian Dietrich Bonhoeffer, whose last message he relayed to Bonhoeffer's friend George Bell. Bell and Bonhoeffer's efforts to interest the British government in supporting German anti-Nazi forces failed in large part because of Churchill's distaste for Chamberlain's actions and the fear of another Venlo Incident. In late April 1945, Best was on the transport to Tyrol where he was liberated by regular German troops under the Command of Wichard von Alvensleben.

== Life after World War II ==
After the war, Best ran an import-export business in The Hague dealing in Humber bicycles. In 1953, his marriage to May ended. He lived with his third wife, Bridget for many years before her Roman catholic husband died and they married. they lived near wiltshire'e Hampshire border where she was a teacher before they moved to where he died. Calne, Wiltshire, England.

In 1950, with permission from Stewart Graham Menzies, head of SIS ('C'), Best published his memoirs under the title The Venlo Incident that became a bestseller. He died in 1978, aged 93, in Calne. His ashes were scattered in the Garden of Remembrance of the crematorium in Swindon.

== Sources ==
- Andrew, Christopher. "The Mobilization of British Intelligence for the Two World Wars" in the Collection Mobilization for Total War: The Canadian, American, and British Experience ISBN 0-88920-109-9
- Owen, David. Hidden Secrets: The Complete History of Espionage and the Technology Used to Support It ISBN 1-55297-564-9
- Weale, Adrian (2012). Army of Evil: A History of the SS. New York: Caliber Printing. ISBN 978-0-451-23791-0.
