= Gasteig =

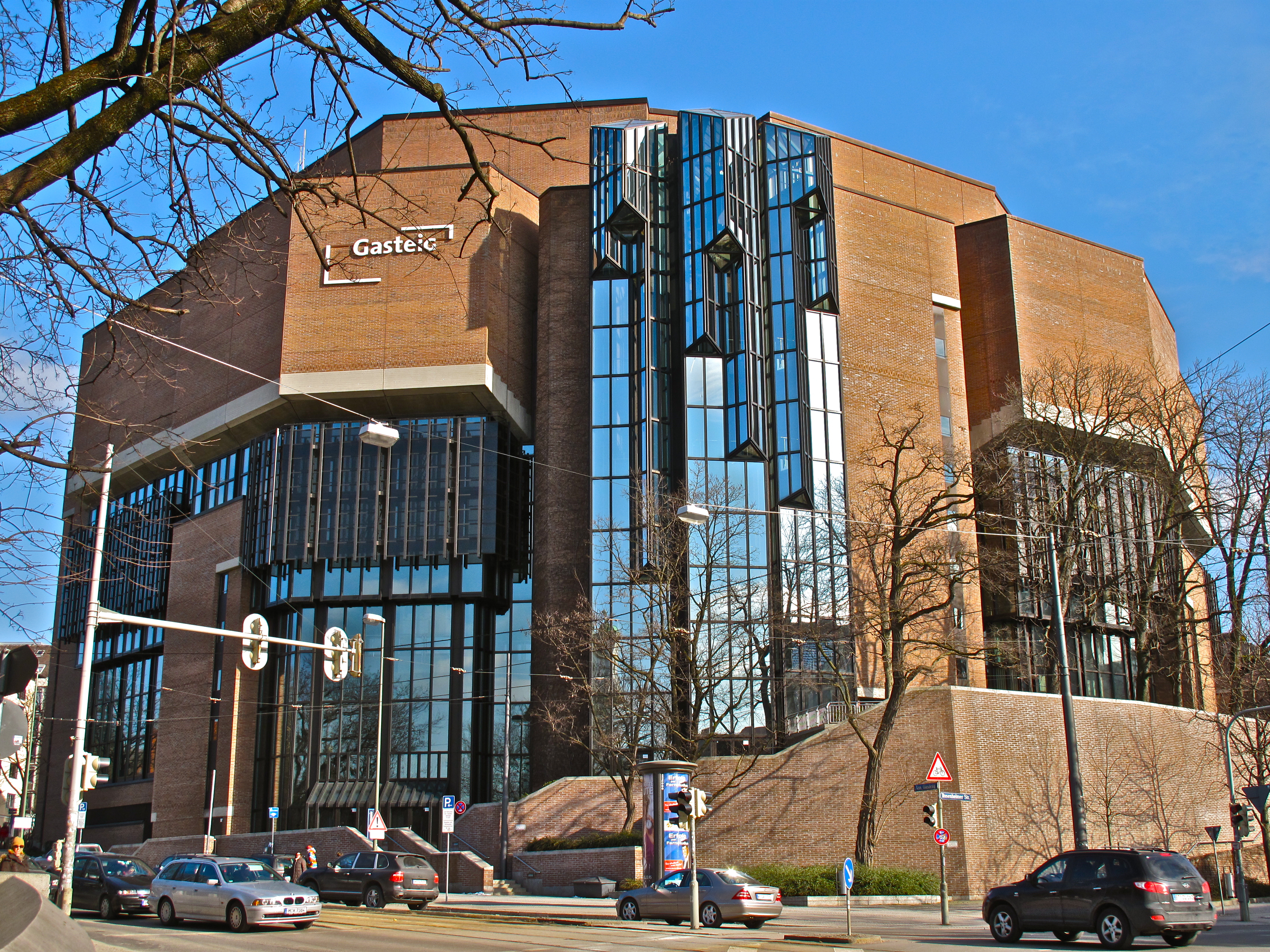
- Interactive map of the Gasteig area

General information
- Type: Cultural centre
- Location: Munich, Rosenheimer Str. 5, Germany
- Coordinates: 48°07′53″N 11°35′29″E
- Groundbreaking: 1978
- Completed: 1984
- Opened: 10 November 1985

Website
- gasteig.de

The Gasteig [ɡaːʃtaɪ̯k] is a currently closed cultural center in Munich, opened in 1985, which hosts the Munich Philharmonic Orchestra. The Richard Strauss Conservatory, the Volkshochschule, and the municipal library are all located in the Gasteig. Most of the events of the Filmfest München, and many of the events of the Munich Biennale take place here.

As of 2025, the Gasteig is closed and planned to undergo major renovation and reconstruction until at least 2035. A provisional venue for many of its functions is Gasteig HP8.

== History ==
The estate behind the Gasteig was until its demolition in 1979 the location of the Bürgerbräukeller, stage for the 1923 Beer Hall Putsch and the 1939 Hitler assassination attempt by Georg Elser. A memorial plaque for Elser is located outside the GEMA building. An illuminated information board in the passage next to the Glashalle describes the historical context for the memorial plaque.

The name is from Bavarian gache Steig, 'steep path,' that ran from the river to this area.

== Venue ==
Interior of the Philharmonie

- Philharmonie, 2,387 seats, with a Klais Organ
- Carl-Orff-Saal, 528–598 seats
- Black Box, 120–225 seats
- Kleiner Konzertsaal (small concert hall), 191 seats

The Philharmonic Hall, opening like a great wood-panelled seashell, has an intimate atmosphere but poor acoustic qualities. The smaller hall "Kleiner Konzertsaal" offers slightly better acoustics for chamber music. The Gasteig comprises the Carl Orff Hall with a stage for drama, the Richard Strauss Conservatory, the Black Box studio theatre, the Münchner Volkshochschule (Adult Education Centre) for further education, various cafés and shops, e.g. the 'Pappnase' (cardboard nose) offering a selection of dramatic requisites, and the central branch of the Municipal Library with its extensive stock of books and periodicals.

When famed conductor Leonard Bernstein was asked on his opinion of the hall, he remarked, "Burn it."
