= Georg Elser =

Attempted assassin of Adolf Hitler (1903–1945)

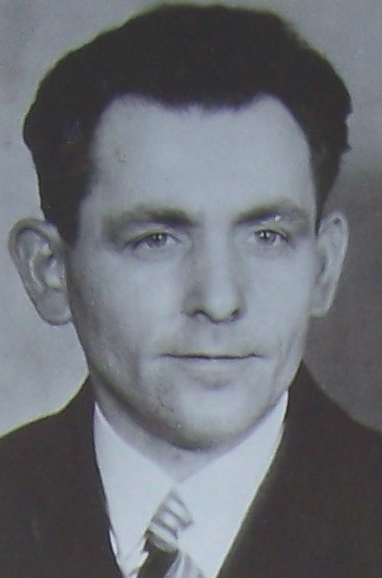
- Photo in a personnel file of Georg Elser from the Düsseldorf State Police Headquarters
- Born: Johann Georg Elser; 4 January 1903; Hermaringen, Württemberg, German Empire
- Died: 9 April 1945 (aged 42); Dachau concentration camp, Dachau, Bavaria, Nazi Germany
- Cause of death: Execution by shooting
- Occupation: Carpenter
- Known for: Attempting to assassinate Adolf Hitler

Johann Georg Elser (German: [ˈɡeːɔʁk ˈɛlzɐ]; 4 January 1903 – 9 April 1945) was a German carpenter who planned and carried out an elaborate assassination attempt on Adolf Hitler and other high-ranking Nazi leaders on 8 November 1939 at the Bürgerbräukeller in Munich (known as the Bürgerbräukeller Bombing). Elser constructed and placed a bomb near the platform from which Hitler was to deliver a speech. It did not kill Hitler, who left earlier than expected, but it did kill 8 people and injured 62 others. Elser was held as a prisoner for more than five years until he was executed at Dachau concentration camp less than a month before the surrender of Nazi Germany.

== Background ==
=== Family and early life ===
Georg Elser (the name normally used to refer to him) was born in Hermaringen, Württemberg, to Ludwig Elser (1872–1942) and Maria Müller (1879–1960). His parents married one year after his birth, and Maria moved to Königsbronn to live with Ludwig on his smallholding. His father was a timber merchant, while his mother worked on the farm. Georg was often left to care for his five younger siblings: Friederike (born 1904), Maria (born 1906), Ludwig (born 1909), Anna (born 1910) and Leonhard (born 1913). He attended elementary school in Königsbronn from 1910 to 1917 and showed ability in drawing, penmanship and mathematics. His childhood was marred by his father's heavy drinking. Elser recalled in his interrogation by the Gestapo in 1939 how his father habitually came home late from work drunk.

=== Career and social life ===
In 1917, Elser worked for half a year assisting in his father's business. Seeking independence, he started an apprenticeship as a lathe operator at the smelter in Königsbronn, but had to quit for health reasons. Between 1919 and 1922, he was apprenticed to master woodworker Robert Sapper in Königsbronn. After topping his class at Heidenheim Trade School, he worked in the furniture factory of Paul Rieder in Aalen. In 1925, he left home to briefly work at the Wachter woodworking company in the small community of Bernried, near Tettnang. Exploring along Lake Constance on foot, he arrived at Friedrichshafen, where he found employment shaping wooden propellers for the fledgling aircraft-manufacturer Dornier.

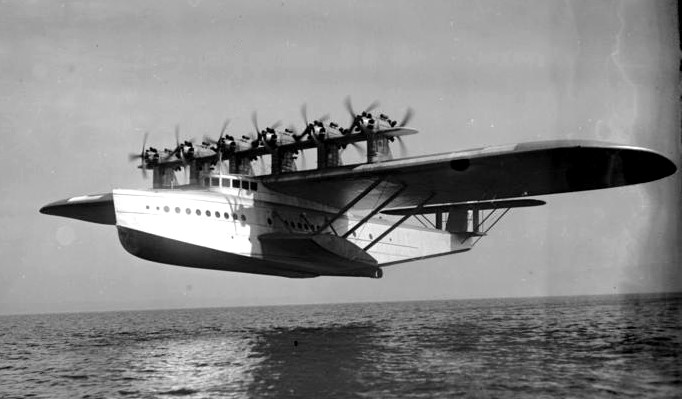
Dornier flying boat, 1932

In August 1925, a work-friend enticed Elser to go with him to Konstanz to work in a clock factory. Due to lack of work, the clock factory closed down, was sold, then reopened as the Schuckmann Clock Factory. Elser was re-employed, but, along with the other employees, he was dismissed when the factory mysteriously burned down after the owner had unsuccessfully tried to sell the failing business. During this period, Elser shared a room with a Communist co-worker who convinced him to join the Red Front-Fighters League. He also joined traditional dress and dance groups (German: Trachtenvereine). In 1929, he found work with Schönholzer, a small woodworking company in Bottighofen; this required Elser to cross the border daily into Switzerland. The work ran out within six months, however, and he was let go.

Around this time Elser met a waitress, Mathilde Niedermann (1910-1980). When she became pregnant, he drove her to Geneva in Switzerland. Mathilde was found to be in the fourth month of pregnancy, precluding a legal abortion. The child was born, a boy named Manfred (1930-1997). When Elser left Mathilde, he was left with child-support payments that often surpassed his weekly wage.

In 1930, Elser began commuting daily by ferry from Konstanz to work in the small Rothmund clock factory in Meersburg where he made housings for wall and table clocks. At the Kreuzlingen Free Temperance Union he started a friendship with a seamstress, Hilda Lang. Between May and August 1932, after Rothmund closed down, he lived with several families in Meersburg doing odd carpentry jobs.

In August 1932, Elser returned to Königsbronn after receiving a call for help from his mother. His alcoholic father, often violent and abusive towards her, was now heavily in debt. Elser assisted his parents in their work and supplemented his income by making furniture in a home workshop until his father was forced to sell the family property in late 1935. Elser escaped the grim family situation with music, playing flute, accordion, bass and the zither. He joined the Zither Club in Königsbronn in early 1933.

At around this time, Elser joined a hiking club where he met Elsa Härlen. He moved to lodge in the Härlens' basement, building kitchen cabinets, kitchen chairs and a doll's house for Elsa. Their love affair in the spring of 1936 led to her separation from her husband in 1937 and divorce in 1938.

In 1936, Elser worked with a carpenter named Grupp in Königsbronn, making desks and installing windows, but soon gave up the job, believing the pay was too low. He began working as a labourer at the Waldenmaier armament factory in Heidenheim, commuting by train or by bike from Königsbronn. While working there, he began a friendship with a fellow employee, Maria Schmauder.

In 1938, Elser's parents bought half of a double house together with their son Leonhard and his wife. Elser felt cheated, and was forced to move out of the house, severing ties with his family except for his sister Maria in Stuttgart. In May 1939, he moved in with the Schmauder family in nearby Schnaitheim.

At Waldenmaier, Elser worked in the shipping department and had access to many parts of the plant, including the "special department" where fuses and detonators were produced. After his arrest and confession, Elser told the Gestapo: "Before the decision to take my action in the fall of 1938, I had stolen neither parts nor powder from the factory."

=== Ideology and religion ===
Elser, a carpenter and cabinet-maker by trade, became a member of the left-leaning Federation of Woodworkers Union. He also joined the Red Front-Fighters' Association, although he told his interrogators in 1939 that he attended a political assembly no more than three times while a member. He also stated that he voted for the Communist Party until 1933, as he considered the KPD the best defender of workers' interests. There is evidence that Elser opposed Nazism from the beginning of the regime in 1933; he refused to perform the Hitler salute, did not join others in listening to Hitler's speeches broadcast on the radio, and did not vote in the elections or referendums during the Nazi era.

Elser met Josef Schurr, a Communist from Schnaitheim, at a Woodworkers' Union meeting in Königsbronn in 1933. Elser had antifascist views, supported by a letter that Schurr sent to a newspaper in Ulm in 1947 which stated that Elser "was always extremely interested in some act of violence against Hitler and his cronies. He always called Hitler a 'gypsy'—one just had to look at his criminal face."

Elser's parents were Protestant, and he attended church with his mother as a child, though his attendance lapsed. His church attendance increased during 1939 – after he had decided to carry out the assassination attempt – either at a Protestant or Roman Catholic church. He claimed that church attendance and the recitation of the Lord's Prayer calmed him. He told his arresting officers: "I believe in the survival of the soul after death, and I also believed that I would not go to heaven if I had not had an opportunity to prove that I wanted good. I also wanted to prevent by my act even greater bloodshed."

== Prelude ==
=== Motive ===
During four days of interrogation in Berlin (19–22 November 1939), Elser articulated his motive to his interrogators:

I considered how to improve the conditions of the workers and avoid a war. For this I was not encouraged by anyone ... Even from Radio Moscow I never heard that the German government and the regime must be overthrown. I reasoned the situation in Germany could only be modified by a removal of the current leadership, I mean Hitler, Goering and Goebbels ... I did not want to eliminate Nazism ... I was merely of the opinion that a moderation in the policy objectives will occur through the elimination of these three men ... The idea of eliminating the leadership came to me in the fall of 1938 ... I thought to myself that this is only possible if the leadership is together at a rally. From the daily press I gathered that the next meeting of leaders was happening on 8 and 9 November 1938 in Munich in the Bürgerbräukeller.

Five years later in Dachau concentration camp, SS officer Lechner claimed Elser revealed his motive to him:

I had to do it because, for his whole life, Hitler has meant the downfall of Germany ... don't think that I'm some kind of dyed-in-the-wool Communist — I'm not. I have some sympathy for Ernst Thälmann, but getting rid of Hitler just became an obsession of mine ... But, as you can see — I got caught, and now I have to pay for it. I would have preferred it if they'd executed me right away.

== Plot ==
In order to find out how best to implement his assassination plan, Elser travelled to Munich by train on 8 November 1938, the day of Hitler's annual speech on the anniversary of the Beer Hall Putsch. Elser was not able to enter the Bürgerbräukeller until 10:30 p.m., when the crowd had dispersed. He stayed until midnight before going back to his lodging. The next morning, he returned to Königsbronn. On the following day, 10 November, the anti-Jewish violence of the Kristallnacht took place in Munich. "In the following weeks I slowly concocted in my mind that it was best to pack explosives in the pillar directly behind the speaker's podium," Elser told his interrogators a year later. He continued to work in the Waldenmaier armament factory in Heidenheim and systematically stole explosives, hiding packets of powder in his bedroom. Realising he needed the exact dimensions of the column to build his bomb he returned to Munich, staying 4–12 April 1939. He took a camera with him, a Christmas gift from Maria Schmauder. He had just become unemployed due to an argument with a factory supervisor.

In April–May 1939, Elser found a labouring job at the Vollmer quarry in Königsbronn. While there, he collected an arsenal of 105 blasting cartridges and 125 detonators, causing him to admit to his interrogators, "I knew two or three detonators were sufficient for my purposes, but I thought the surplus will increase the explosive effect." Living with the Schmauder family in Schnaitheim he made many sketches, telling his hosts he was working on an "invention".

In July, in a secluded orchard owned by his parents, Elser tested several prototypes of his bomb. Clock movements given to him in lieu of wages when leaving Rothmund in Meersburg in 1932 and a car indicator "winker" were incorporated into the "infernal machine". In August, after a bout of sickness, he left for Munich. Powder, explosives, a battery and detonators filled the false bottom of his wooden suitcase. Other boxes contained his clothes, clock movements and the tools of his trade.

=== The Bürgerbräukeller ===
Elser arrived in Munich on 5 August 1939. Using his real name, he rented a room in the apartments of two unsuspecting couples, at first staying with the Baumanns and from 1 September, Alfons and Rosa Lehmann. He soon became a regular at the Bürgerbräukeller restaurant for his evening meal. As before, he was able to enter the adjoining Bürgerbräukeller Hall before the doors were locked at about 10:30 p.m.

Over the next two months, Elser stayed all night inside the Bürgerbräukeller 30 to 35 times. Working on the gallery level and using a flashlight dimmed with a blue handkerchief, he started by installing a secret door in the timber panelling to a pillar behind the speaker's rostrum. After removing the plaster behind the door, he hollowed out a chamber in the brickwork for his bomb. Normally completing his work around 2:00–3:00 a.m., he dozed in the storeroom off the gallery until the doors were unlocked at about 6:30 a.m. He then left via a rear door, often carrying a small suitcase filled with debris.

Security was relatively lax at the Bürgerbräukeller. Christian Weber, a veteran from the Beer Hall Putsch and the Munich city councillor, was responsible. However, from the beginning of September, after the outbreak of war with Poland, Elser was aware of the presence of air raid wardens and two "free-running dogs" in the building.

While he worked at night in the Bürgerbräukeller, Elser built his device during the day. He purchased extra parts, including sound insulation, from local hardware stores and became friends with the local master woodworker, Brög, who allowed him use of his workshop.

On the nights of 1–2 November, Elser installed the explosives in the pillar. On 4–5 November, which were Saturday and Sunday dance nights, he had to buy a ticket and wait in the gallery until after 1 a.m. before he could install the twin-clock mechanism that would trigger the detonator. To celebrate the completion of his work, Elser recalled later, "I left by the back road and went to the Isartorplatz where at the kiosk I drank two cups of coffee."

On 6 November, Elser left Munich for Stuttgart to stay overnight with his sister, Maria Hirth, and her husband. Leaving them his tool boxes and baggage, he returned to Munich the next day for a final check. Arriving at the Bürgerbräukeller at 10 p.m., he waited for an opportunity to open the bomb chamber and satisfy himself the clock mechanism was correctly set. The next morning he departed Munich by train for Friedrichshafen via Ulm. After a shave at a hairdresser, he took the 6:30 p.m. steamer to Konstanz.

== Bombing ==
Bürgerbräukeller Bombing
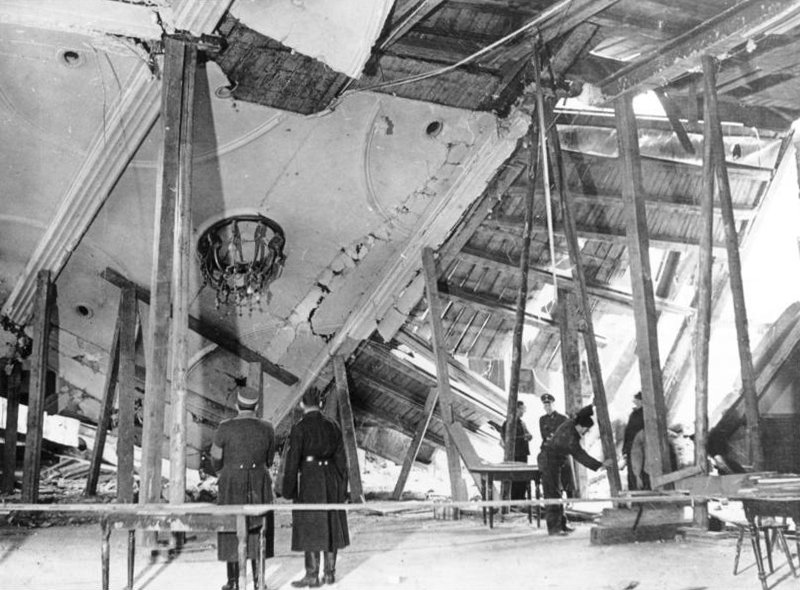
- The Bürgerbräukeller after the bombing
- Type: Decapitation strike using a time bomb
- Location: Bürgerbräukeller, Munich
- Planned by: Georg Elser
- Objective: Assassinate Adolf Hitler and other high-ranking Nazi leaders; Prevent destruction of Germany; Prevent another world war and the deaths it would cause
- Date: 8 November 1939, 21:20 (UTC+2)
- Executed by: Georg Elser
- Outcome: Hitler survives as he left 13 minutes before the explosion; Elser is arrested and executed in 1945
- Casualties: 8 killed, 62 injured

=== Hitler's escape ===
The high-ranking Nazis who accompanied Adolf Hitler to the anniversary of the Beer Hall Putsch on 8 November 1939 were Joseph Goebbels, Reinhard Heydrich, Rudolf Hess, Robert Ley, Alfred Rosenberg, Julius Streicher, August Frank, Hermann Esser and Heinrich Himmler. Hitler was welcomed to the platform by Christian Weber.

Unknown to Elser, Hitler had initially cancelled his speech at the Bürgerbräukeller to devote his attention to planning the imminent war with France, but changed his mind and attended after all. As fog was forecast, possibly preventing him from flying back to Berlin the next morning, Hitler decided to return to Berlin the same night by his private train. With the departure from Munich's main station set for 9:30 p.m., the start time of the reunion was brought forward half an hour to 8 p.m. and Hitler cut his speech from the planned two hours to a one-hour duration.

Hitler ended his address to the 3,000-strong audience of the party faithful at 9:07 p.m., thirteen minutes before Elser's bomb detonated at 9:20 p.m. By that time, Hitler and his entourage had left the Bürgerbräukeller. The bomb brought down part of the ceiling and roof and caused the gallery and an external wall to collapse, leaving a mountain of rubble. Hitler did not learn of the attempt on his life until later that night on a stop in Nuremberg. When told of the bombing by Goebbels, Hitler responded, "A person has to be lucky" (Glück muss der Mensch haben). After returning to Munich to inspect the scene of the bombing, Hitler claimed to have experienced a "premonition" and on the train ride back, Hitler told his comrades, "Now I am completely at peace! My leaving the Bürgerbräu[keller] earlier than usual is proof to me that Providence wants me to reach my goal." ("Jetzt bin ich völlig ruhig! Dass ich den Bürgerbräu früher als sonst verlassen habe, ist mir eine Bestätigung, dass die Vorsehung mich mein Ziel erreichen lassen will.")

=== Casualties ===
Of the 120 people that were still in the hall at the time, sixty-three were injured, sixteen seriously. Seven were killed at the scene while one injured person died a few days later. All but one of those killed were members of the Nazi Party, of which all but one had been longtime supporters of the ideology.

- Maria Henle (30), cashier and waitress at the Bürgerbräukeller
- Franz Lutz (53), SA-Sturmhauptführer
- Wilhelm Kaiser (50), SA-Sturmhauptführer, deputy leader of NSKK Regiment 86
- Wilhelm Weber (37), SA-Mann, radio equipment technician
- Leonhardt Reindl (57), Nazi member since 1923, awarded with the Honour Chevron for the Old Guard for being part of Alte Kämpfer
- Emil Kasberger (54), long-time Nazi member, flautist in Traditionsgau München-Oberbayern
- Eugen Schachta (32), SA-Mann, radio equipment technician, Haupteinsatzleiter for Reichsautozug
- Michael Schmeidl (73), Nazi member since before 1930 and retired Oberamtmann; died 13 November from arm injuries

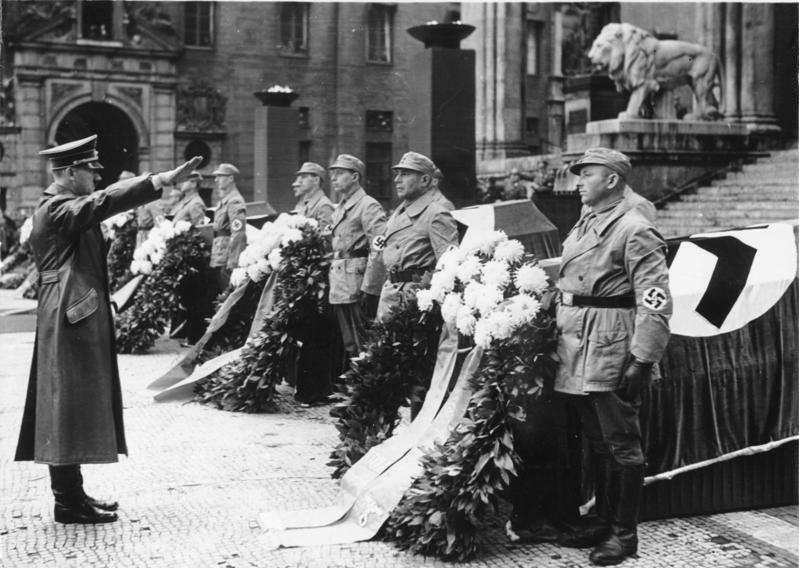
"The solemn act of state in front of the Feldherrnhalle in Munich (11 November 1939) for the seven victims of the criminal bomb attack in Bürgerbräukeller on 8 November 1939" (original caption)

=== Honouring the victims ===
In Munich on 9 November, the annual guard of honour for the sixteen "blood martyrs" of the NSDAP who died in the Beer Hall Putsch of 1923 was held at the Feldherrnhalle as usual. Two days later, at the same location, an official ceremony for the victims of the Bürgerbräukeller bombing took place. Hitler returned from Berlin to stand before seven flag-draped coffins as Rudolf Hess addressed the SA guard, the onlookers, and listeners to Grossdeutsche Rundfunk ("Greater German Radio"). In his half-hour oration, Hess was not short on hyperbole:

At this time the German people take their sad leave of the victims of a gruesome crime, a crime almost unparalleled in history ... The perpetrators of this crime have succeeded in teaching the German people to hate ... this enormous crime, this war which was forced upon us, will turn out in favour of the Führer, in favour of Germany—in favour of Germany and the entire world.

After "Der gute Kamerad" was played, Hitler placed a wreath of chrysanthemums on each coffin, then stepped back to lift his arm in the Nazi salute. The very slow playing of "Deutschland über alles" ended the solemn ceremony.

=== Arrest ===
At 8:45 p.m. on the night of 8 November, Elser was apprehended by two border guards, 25 metres (80 ft) from the Swiss border fence in Konstanz. When taken to the border control post and asked to empty his pockets he was found to be carrying wire cutters, numerous notes and sketches pertaining to explosive devices, firing pins and a blank colour postcard of the interior of the Bürgerbräukeller. At 11 p.m., during Elser's interrogation by the Gestapo in Konstanz, news of the bombing in Munich arrived by teleprinter. The next day, Elser was transferred by car to Munich Gestapo Headquarters.

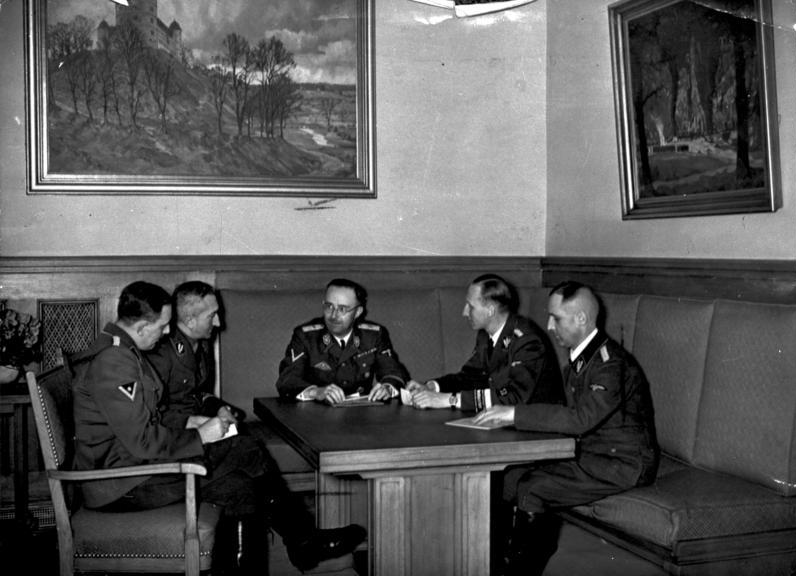
Himmler (centre) in conference with Huber, Nebe, Heydrich, and Müller, (left to right) in November 1939

=== Investigation ===
While still returning to Berlin by train, Hitler ordered Heinrich Himmler to put Arthur Nebe, head of Kripo (Criminal Police), in charge of the investigation into the Munich bombing. Himmler did this, but also assigned total control of the investigation to the chief of the Gestapo, Heinrich Müller. Müller immediately ordered the arrest of all Bürgerbräukeller personnel, while Nebe ran the onsite investigation, sifting through the debris.

Nebe had early success, finding the remains of brass plates bearing patent numbers of a clock maker in Schwenningen, Baden-Würtemberg. Despite the clear evidence of the German make, Himmler released to the press that the metal parts pointed to "foreign origin".

Himmler offered a reward of 500,000 marks for information leading to the capture of the culprits, and the Gestapo was soon deluged with hundreds of suspects. When one suspect was reported to have detonator parts in his pockets, Otto Rappold of the counter-espionage arm of the Gestapo sped to Königsbronn and neighbouring towns. Every family member and possible acquaintance of Elser was rounded up for interrogation.

At the Schmauder residence in Schnaitheim, 16-year-old Maria Schmauder told of her family's recent boarder who was working on an "invention", had a false bottom in his suitcase, and worked at the Vollmer quarry.

=== Interrogation in Munich ===
On 9 November, as only one of many suspects being held at Munich Gestapo Headquarters, Elser did not attract much attention for a few days, but when face-to-face meetings took place with Bürgerbräukeller staff, waitress Maria Strobl identified Elser as the odd customer who never ordered more than one drink. Later, on the basis of his Swabian accent, Elser was identified by a storekeeper as the man to whom he had sold a "sound proofing insulation plate" to deaden the sound of ticking clocks.

Nebe called in Franz Josef Huber, head of the Gestapo in Vienna, to assist. Huber had the idea of asking Elser to bare his knees. When he did, they were found to be badly bruised, the apparent result of working at low level during his night work at the Bürgerbräukeller.

Dr Albrecht Böhme, head of the Munich Kripo, was witness to a severe and prolonged beating of Elser, in which he said Himmler participated. He later recalled: "But Elser, who was groaning and bleeding profusely from the mouth and nose, made no confession; he would probably not have been physically able to, even if he had wanted to." However, on 15 November, Elser made a full written confession, though the document did not survive the war.

Berlin, Prinz-Albrecht-Strasse 8 — Reich Security Main Office, formerly Kunstgewerbemuseum (original caption)

=== Interrogation in Berlin ===
Elser was transferred to Berlin Gestapo Headquarters on Prinz Albrecht Strasse, possibly on 18 November. His parents, siblings and their spouses, together with his former girlfriend Elsa Härlen, were taken by train to Berlin to be held in Moabit prison and then in the grand Hotel Kaiserhof. His mother, sister Maria Hirth, brother-in-law Karl Hirth and Elsa Härlen were interrogated in the presence of Elser.

In 1950, Elsa Härlen recollected:

... His face was swollen and beaten black and blue. His eyes were bulging out of their sockets, and I was horrified by his appearance ... An officer placed himself behind Elser and, to make him talk, he kept striking him on the back or on the back of his head ... What he said was something like this: He had taken black powder from the Vollmer Company, and with this he had built a time bomb. He had been induced to do this by foreign agents and had acted on their orders ...

Härlen was left in no doubt that Elser was only repeating what his interrogators wanted him to say. Apart from Maria Hirth and her husband, who were considered accomplices and imprisoned for over one year, the family members and Härlen were allowed to return home. While in Berlin, Härlen received special attention, being interviewed by Heinrich Himmler, having an audience with Adolf Hitler, and being quizzed by Martin Bormann. However, she did not help their cause, which was to find some fragment of evidence that Elser had not acted alone.

While in Berlin, Elser made five full-size drawings of the design of his bomb in order to persuade his interrogators that he was the sole instigator of the assassination attempt. These drawings are referred to in the Gestapo interrogation report, but have not survived.

=== Interrogation report ===
Five days of torture, 19–23 November, produced the Gestapo Protokoll (interrogation report). The document was signed off by Kappler, Schmidt and Seibold for the "Kriminalkommissare". Buried in the German archives in Koblenz until 1964, this report is now considered the most important source of information on Elser. The report did not mention the interrogation of Elser's family members and Elsa Härlen in Berlin, as the report contains only the answers Elser gave to his interrogators. On the vital question that he was the sole instigator, Elser had this to say:

I also had the intention, and considered in detail, to write from Switzerland to the German police to explain that I was the sole culprit in the assassination, no accomplice or accomplices have I had. I would have also sent along an accurate drawing of my apparatus and a description of the execution of the deed, so that one could verify my claim. With such a message to the German police, I just wanted to ensure that under no circumstances would any innocent person be arrested in the search for perpetrators.

When Himmler read the final report, he flew into a rage and scrawled in green ink on the red cover: "What idiot wrote this?"

=== Nazi propaganda ===
Discarding the interrogation report that found Elser solely responsible, Hitler proceeded to use the Bürgerbräukeller bombing for propaganda purposes. On 22 November, German newspapers were filled with the story that the assassin, Georg Elser, had been funded by the British Intelligence Service, while the organiser of the crime was Otto Strasser. Photos of two British SIS officers, Richard Henry Stevens and Sigismund Payne Best, captured in the Venlo Incident on 9 November 1939, shared the front page of Deutsche Allgemeine Zeitung with a photo of Georg Elser.

SS officer Walter Schellenberg later wrote in his memoirs (The Labyrinth):

He (Hitler) began to issue detailed directives on the handling of the case to Himmler, Heydrich, and me and gave releases to the press. To my dismay, he became increasingly convinced that the attempt on his life had been the work of the British Intelligence, and that (British SIS officers) Best and Stevens, working together with Otto Strasser, were the real organizers of this crime ... Meanwhile a carpenter by the name of Elser had been arrested while trying to escape over the Swiss border. The circumstantial evidence against him was very strong, and finally he confessed ... I thought it possible that the Black Front organization of Otto Strasser might have something to do with the matter and that the British Secret Service might also be involved. But to connect Best and Stevens with the Beer Cellar attempt on Hitler's life seemed to me quite ridiculous. Nevertheless that was exactly what was in Hitler's mind. He announced to the press that Elser and the officers of the British Secret Service would be tried together. In high places there was talk of a great public trial, to be staged ... for the benefit of the German people. I tried to think of the best way to prevent this lunacy.

The Swiss magazine Appenzeller Zeitung reported on 23 November 1939 that Otto Strasser had denied any knowledge of Elser, Best or Stevens in an interview in Paris. On 13 November, Swiss authorities had expelled Strasser from Switzerland, after he was found to have made disparaging remarks about Hitler in a foreign newspaper in October.

=== Torture, drugs and hypnosis ===
The basement cells of the Berlin Gestapo Headquarters were notorious for the inhumane treatment of prisoners. It was rumoured Elser was kept imprisoned on the top floor until January or February 1941.

Arthur Nebe told Hans Gisevius of Elser's frayed state during this period. Gisevius wrote later,

... Elser was just a shell of his former self because they (the Gestapo) had tried to squeeze information out of him by feeding him very salty herring and exposing him to heat, and then depriving him of liquids ... They wanted him to confess to some kind of connection, however vague, to Otto Strasser. The artisan remained steadfast. Almost like an innocent child or the kind of person one sometimes finds among sect members, he told Nebe of his torment, not begging mercy, not even complaining — it was more like an outburst of joy at seeing once again the person (Nebe) who had treated him humanely since his arrest.

Walter Schellenberg wrote of a conversation with Heinrich Müller, who told him,

So far I've always been able to break every one of these types that I've taken on. If this guy had been treated to my beatings earlier on, he never would have thought up this nonsense. In a subsequent discussion, Hitler issued an order to Heydrich: 'I would like to know what kind of man this Elser is. We must be able to classify him somehow. Report back to me on this. And furthermore, use all means to get this criminal to talk. Have him hypnotized, give him drugs; make use of everything of this nature our scientists have tried. I want to know who the instigators are. I want to know who is behind this.'

Three days later, Schellenberg heard from Müller that three doctors had worked on Elser for twenty-four hours, injecting him with "sizable quantities of Pervitin", but he continued to say the same thing. Four hypnotists were summoned. Only one could put Elser into a trance, but the prisoner stuck to the same story. The psychologist wrote in his report that Elser was a "fanatic" and had a pathological desire for recognition. He concluded by saying pointedly: Elser had the "drive to achieve fame by eliminating Hitler and simultaneously liberating Germany from the evil of Hitler.'"

=== Reconstruction of the bomb ===
While at Berlin Gestapo Headquarters, Müller put Elser into a workshop and ordered him to reconstruct the explosive device he used at the Bürgerbräukeller. When Reinhard Heydrich and Walter Schellenberg visited Elser in the workshop, Schellenberg noted, "He [Elser] responded to questioning only with reluctance but opened up when he was praised for his craftsmanship. Then he would comment on his reconstructed model in detail and with great enthusiasm."

Elser's reconstruction of his Bürgerbräukeller bomb was held in such high regard by the Gestapo, they adopted it into their field manuals for training purposes.

== Aftermath ==
=== Consequences for associates ===
The day after the bombing at the Bürgerbräukeller, outraged SS guards at Buchenwald Concentration Camp responded by killing twenty-one Jews by firing squad and imposing three days of food deprivation on Jews in the camp.

The Gestapo descended on the village of Königsbronn to interrogate the inhabitants, asking the same questions over and over for months on end. The village was stigmatized as a nest of criminals and became known as "Assassinville". Elsewhere, everyone who might have had contact with Elser was hunted down and interrogated by the Gestapo.

The quarry owner Georg Vollmer and his employees were severely beaten during Gestapo interrogations. Sentenced to 20 years in Welzheim concentration camp for negligence in dealing with explosive materials, Vollmer was released in 1941 after his wife petitioned Rudolf Hess through old connections. Losing her mind in fear her husband would be taken away again, she died six months after his release. Prior to her death she started a rumor that Karl Kuch, a Zürich music dealer who had died in a car accident in July 1939, had put Elser up to the assassination attempt. The theory alleged that Kuch was the leader of a three-man Communist group, nicknamed "Troika" by Gestapo, who claimed the supposed trio had connections to Otto Strasser and the Soviet NKVD. Elser was questioned about Kuch by Gestapo, who were only able to connect the two through their shared communist leanings and hometown of Königsbronn. The theory became public in 1964, following a three-part report by journalists Günter Peis and Erich Petry of Stern magazine.

Waldenmaier, the owner of the Waldenmaier armaments factory in Heidenheim, was more fortunate than Vollmer. With the backing of the Abwehr in 1944, he received the War Service Cross First Class for significant contributions to the war effort. In 1940, a Gestapo man had told him: "In spite of repeated torture, Elser had stuck to his story that he had carried out the attack in order to save the working people and the entire world from war."

The Munich locksmith Max Niederholer, who had unwittingly supplied Elser with metal parts, was bound and beaten and detained for two weeks by the Gestapo. Being born in London did not help his case. Maria Schmauder's father was subjected to lengthy interrogation, particularly as Elser had admitted to listening to foreign radio stations in his house—even though that practice was not banned until 1 September 1939. Mathilde Niedermann was interrogated over several nights by the Gestapo in 1939. She maintained that Elser was "completely uninterested in politics", even though it was in Konstanz that he became friendly with Communists. Almost sixty years later, Mathilde and Elser's son, Manfred Buhl, spoke at the dedication of the Georg-Elser-Platz in Munich in 1997—the same year he died.

Elser's lover Elsa Härlen said Elser "led a double life and completely separated his political life from his private life". In an interview in 1959, she said she did not want any restitution from the government of the Federal Republic, as "it was those gypsies that were there before" — meaning the Nazis — that had brought her harm. Generally his family had difficulty coming to terms with his confession as the sole instigator. In 1950, his mother continued to lay the blame on others saying: "I don't think my son would come up with anything like that on his own".

=== Imprisonment ===
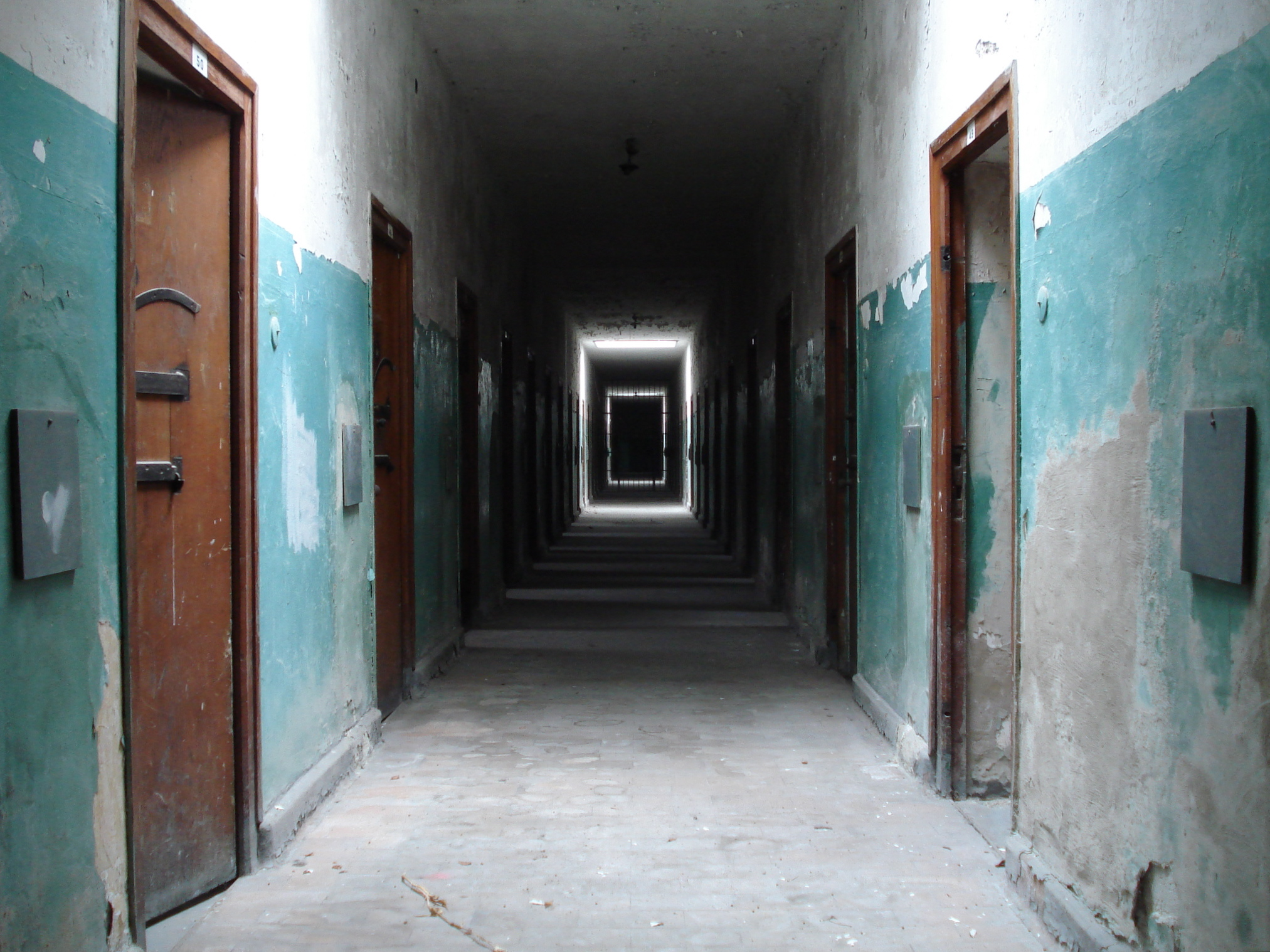
Hallway in the preserved bunker at Dachau concentration camp, 2008

Elser never faced a trial for the bombing of the Bürgerbräukeller. After his year of torment at Berlin Gestapo Headquarters, he was kept in special custody in Sachsenhausen concentration camp between early 1941 and early 1945. At Sachsenhausen, Elser was held in isolation in a T-shaped building reserved for protected prisoners. Accommodated in three joined cells, each 9.35 m^{2}, there was space for his two full-time guards and a work space to make furniture and other things, including several zithers.

Elser's apparent preferential treatment, which included extra rations and daily visits to the camp barber for a shave, aroused interest amongst other prisoners, including British SIS officer Captain S. Payne Best, who wrote later that Elser was also allowed regular visits to the camp brothel. Martin Niemöller was also a special inmate in the Sachsenhausen "bunker" and believed the rumours that Elser was an SS man and an agent of Hitler and Himmler. Elser kept a photo of Elsa Härlen in his cell. In early 1945, Elser was transferred to the bunker at Dachau concentration camp.

=== Death ===
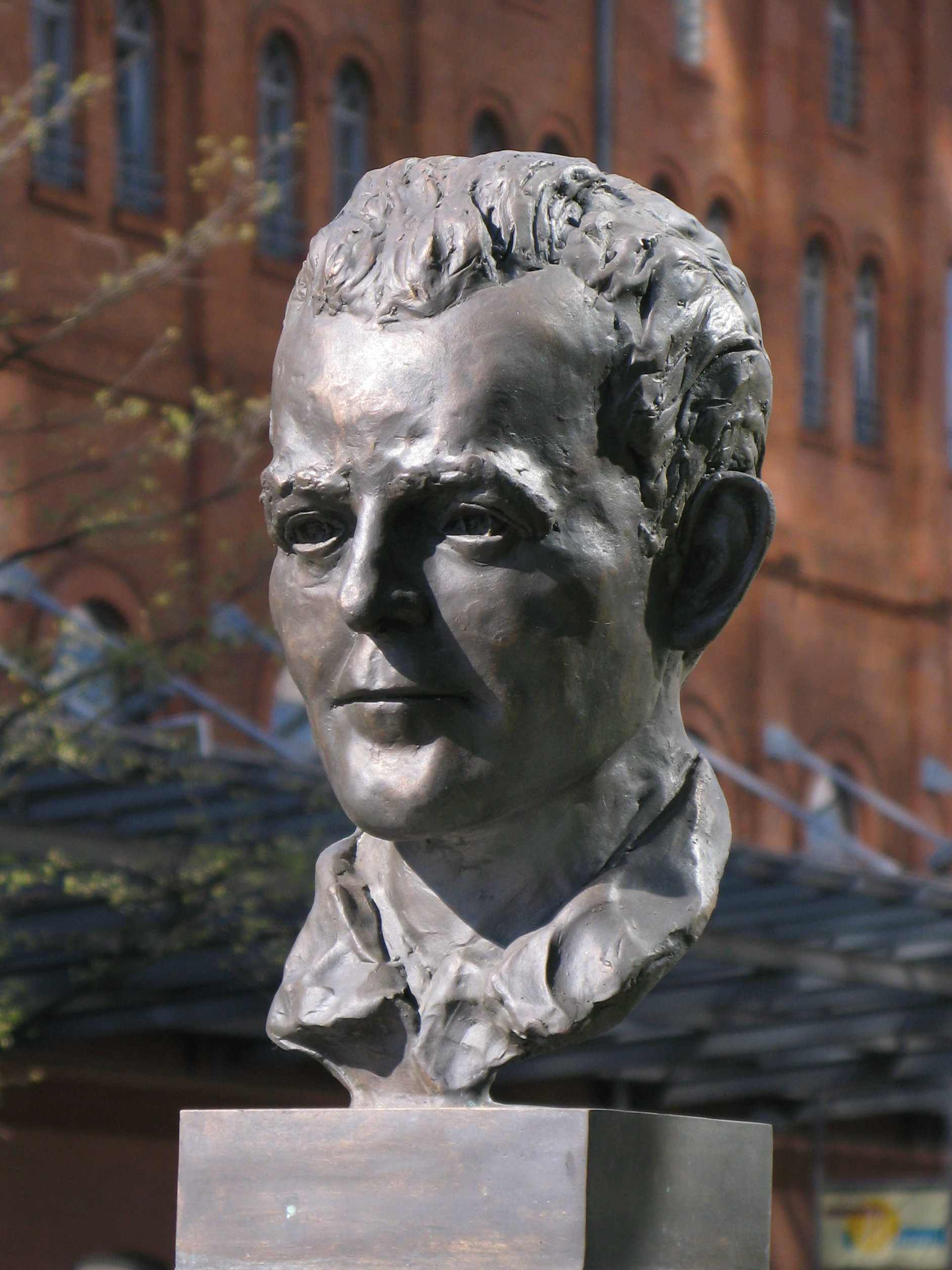
Bust of Georg Elser in Berlin

In April 1945, with German defeat imminent, the Nazis' intention of staging a show trial over the Bürgerbräukeller bombing had become futile. Hitler ordered the execution of special security prisoner "Eller" — the name used for Elser in Dachau — along with Wilhelm Canaris, Dietrich Bonhoeffer and others who had plotted against him. The order, dated 5 April 1945, from the Gestapo HQ in Berlin, was addressed to the Commandant of the Dachau concentration camp, SS-Obersturmbannführer Eduard Weiter.

The order came into the possession of Payne Best in May 1945, and appeared in Best's book, The Venlo Incident. That part of the order relating to Elser reads:

The question of our prisoner in special protective custody, 'Eller', has also again been discussed at highest level. The following directions have been issued: On the occasion of one of the next Terror Attacks on Munich, or, as the case may be, the neighbourhood of Dachau, it shall be pretended that 'Eller' suffered fatal injuries. I request you therefore, when such an occasion arises to liquidate 'Eller' as discreetly as possible. Please take steps that only a few people, who must be specially pledged to silence, hear about this. The notification to me regarding the execution of this order shall be something like:
'On ... caused by a Terror Attack (air raid) on ... the prisoner in protective custody 'Eller' was fatally wounded.'
After noting the contents and carrying out the orders contained in it, destroy this letter.

The signature on the order was illegible, according to Best.

In his 1947 book, To The Bitter End, Hans Bernd Gisevius commented on the order:

When the Gestapo men killed on their own account or on the direct orders of Himmler, they did not require such complicated instructions and Hitler's orders for the liquidation of unwanted persons were not usually phrased in so tactful a manner ... (With his own end in sight) Hitler suddenly recalled the existence of 'the Zither player'; and fearfully, as if possessed by a sudden and inexplicable shame, this murderer of millions attempted to conceal his execution of an assassin who had long since been forgotten by the world public.

On 9 April 1945, four weeks before the end of the war in Europe, Georg Elser was shot dead and his fully dressed body immediately burned in the crematorium of Dachau Concentration Camp. He was 42 years old.

In 1954, SS-Oberscharführer Theodor Bongartz, the man in charge of the crematorium at Dachau, was determined to have been the murderer of Georg Elser, during a German court proceeding in which SS-Unterscharführer Edgar Stiller was on trial as an accessory to murder. As the SS man in charge of the special prisoners at Dachau from 1943 to 1945, Stiller was accused of escorting Elser to the crematorium where he was allegedly shot by Bongartz. Theodor Bongartz was not brought to account as he had died of an illness in 1945.

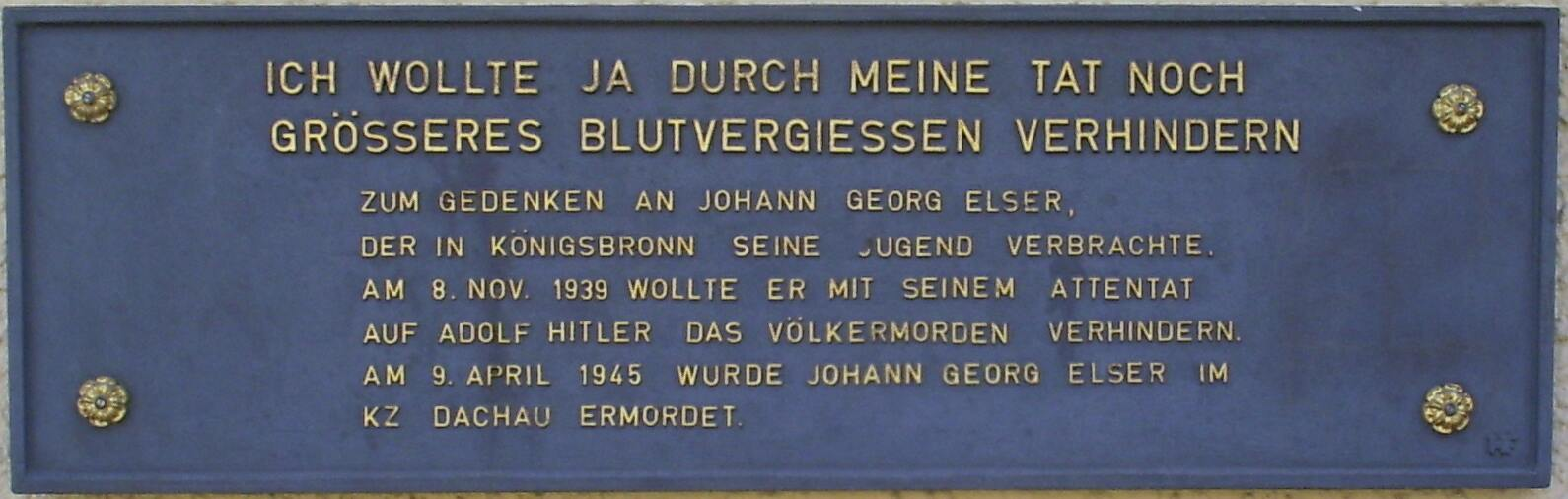
Plaque in memory of Georg Elser in Königsbronn

A plaque dedicated to Elser's memory in Königsbronn says:

"I wanted to prevent even greater bloodshed through my deed". In memory of Johann Georg Elser, who spent his youth in Königsbronn. On 8 November 1939, he tried to prevent the genocide by assassinating Adolf Hitler. On 9 April 1945, Johann Georg Elser was murdered in the Dachau concentration camp.

=== Conspiracy theories ===
Elser has been the subject of rumours and various conspiracy theories since the Bürgerbräukeller bombing. After the war, Protestant pastor and theologian Martin Niemöller, also in custody in the "bunker" at Sachsenhausen, gave credence to the rumour that Elser had been a member of the SS and that the whole assassination attempt had been staged by the Nazis to portray Hitler as being protected by Providence. Many others, like quarry owner Georg Vollmer, building on his dead wife's contribution, weighed in with their version of the truth. In 1948, Allen Dulles, the future Director of Central Intelligence (de facto head of the U.S. Central Intelligence Agency) summed up a range of conspiracy theories when he wrote:

On 8 November a bomb exploded in Bürgerbräukeller in Munich shortly after Hitler had given his annual speech on the anniversary of the beer hall putsch of 1923 and after he had left the building. This event still remains unresolved.

Some evidence suggests that the infernal machine was exploded with the knowledge of Hitler and Himmler in order to consolidate the German sense of community, or, as in the case of the Reichstag fire, to give rise to a new wave of terror.

I heard there were photographs showing a high-ranking SS officer standing next to Hitler with a watch in hand, to take care that the leaders escaped in time. Others claim the attack was the work of communists acting independently and without the knowledge of other anti-Nazi groups. A new report presents the plot as the attempted assassination of an illegal socialist group.

In 1969, historical research by Anton Hoch based on The Gestapo Protokoll (interrogation report) dated 19–23 November 1939, found that Elser had acted alone and there was no evidence to involve the Nazi regime or any outside group in the assassination attempt.

== Memorials ==
Berlin memorial to Georg Elser on Wilhelmstrasse

In contrast to the conspirators of the 20 July 1944 assassination attempt on Hitler, Elser was barely acknowledged in the official commemorative culture of the Federal Republic of Germany until the 1990s. A breakthrough to a positive way of looking at Elser came with the publication of a biography by Hellmut G. Haasis in 1999 followed by an expanded and revised edition in 2009. Since 2001, every two years the Georg-Elser Prize is awarded for courage, and on the occasion of Elser's 100th birthday in January 2003, Deutsche Post issued a special stamp.

There are at least 60 streets and places named after Elser in Germany and several monuments. Welt journalist Claus Christian Malzahn wrote in 2005: "That he was for so long ignored by the historians of both East and West Germany, merely goes to show just how long it took Germany to become comfortable with honestly confronting its own history. Johann Georg Elser, though, defied ideological categorization—and for that reason, he is a true German hero."

In 2008, a music venue called Georg Elser Hallen was demolished in Munich. However, as of 2014, there were five venues in Munich bearing the name Georg Elser Hallen. In 2011, a 17-metre (56 ft) steel sculpture of Georg Elser was unveiled in Berlin, by German playwright Rolf Hochhuth. The memorial, which cost 200,000 euros, was built on Hochhuth's initiative, after the city authorities dismissed the project as too expensive. In the end, the Berlin state senate financed the Elser sculpture, alongside a 50,000 euro donation by an anonymous benefactor. In September 1979, the Bürgerbräukeller was demolished. On its site now stands the GEMA Building, the Gasteig Cultural Centre and the Munich City Hilton Hotel. A plaque in the pavement at the entrance to the GEMA Building marks the position of the pillar that concealed Elser's bomb. 8. November 1939 is the name of the Johann Georg Elser Memorial in Munich to commemorate the resistance fighters fighting against the Nazis. The monument is located in the Maxvorstadt district.

The story of Elser is commemorated in the 1989 film Seven Minutes (German: Georg Elser – Einer aus Deutschland) directed by Klaus Maria Brandauer, and the 2015 film 13 Minutes (German: Elser), directed by Oliver Hirschbiegel.

The Georg Elser Prize was established in 2001. It is awarded every two years to individuals who have demonstrated civil courage or civil disobedience against injustice committed by the state.

== See also ==
- List of assassination attempts on Adolf Hitler
