= Richard Henry Stevens =

British military officer and SIS agent (1893-1967)

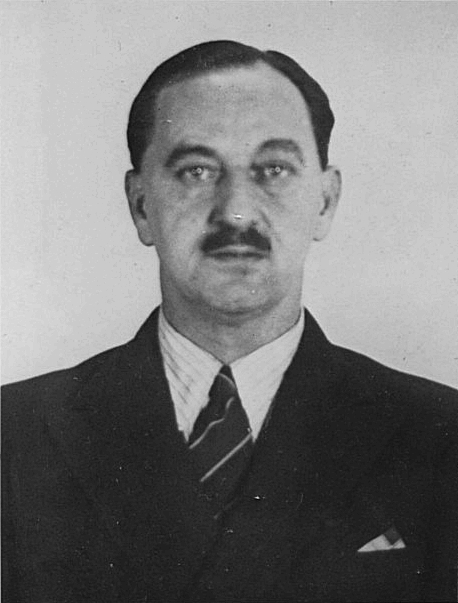
Major Richard Henry Stevens (1939)

Richard Henry Stevens (9 April 1893 – 12 February 1967) was a major in the British Indian Army and from 1939 Head of the Passport Control Office (PCO) of the British Secret Intelligence Service in the Netherlands. His name is closely associated with the Venlo Incident in 1939.

== Background and earlier life ==
Stevens mastered Arabic, Hindustani, and Malay, and until 1939 worked as an intelligence officer in India. That year he was transferred to Europe and put in charge of the SIS station in The Hague. His second language was Greek and he also spoke excellent German, French and Russian but he had no specific training or experience of intelligence gathering in Europe.

== Abduction at the Venlo Incident ==
In November 1939 he was abducted to Germany in the Venlo Incident with Captain Sigismund Payne Best. It has been suggested that he may then have revealed vital secrets about the Secret Intelligence Service under interrogation. In any event, the inexperienced Stevens was carrying on his person a plain-text list of SIS agents when he was abducted.

The two officers were imprisoned for over five years in Sachsenhausen and Dachau concentration camps before their release in April 1945. Nazi propaganda portrayed Best and Stevens as the alleged masterminds of the Beer Hall attempt to assassinate Adolf Hitler by Georg Elser.

== Later life ==
Stevens retired from the Indian army as a lieutenant-colonel on the 26 February 1946, having been promoted to that rank during his captivity. He then worked as a translator at NATO in Paris and London between 1951 and 1952. He died of cancer in 1967.

== See also ==
- Sigismund Payne Best#Second World War intelligence work
