= Bürgerbräukeller =

Historic beer hall in Munich, Germany

Coordinates: 48°07′52″N 11°35′38″E

The Bürgerbräukeller ([ˈbʏʁ.ɡɐ.bʁɔʏ̯.ˌkɛ.lɐ]; "citizen brew cellar") was a large beer hall in Munich, Germany. Opened in 1885, it was one of the largest beer halls of the Bürgerliches Brauhaus. Bürgerliches merged with Löwenbräu, which thereby became the hall's owner.

The Bürgerbräukeller was where Adolf Hitler launched the Beer Hall Putsch in November 1923 and where he announced the re-establishment of the Nazi Party in February 1925. In 1939, the beer hall was the site of an attempted assassination of Hitler and other Nazi leaders by Georg Elser. It survived aerial bombing in World War II.

The Bürgerbräukeller was demolished in 1979, and the Gasteig complex was built on its site.

== Location ==
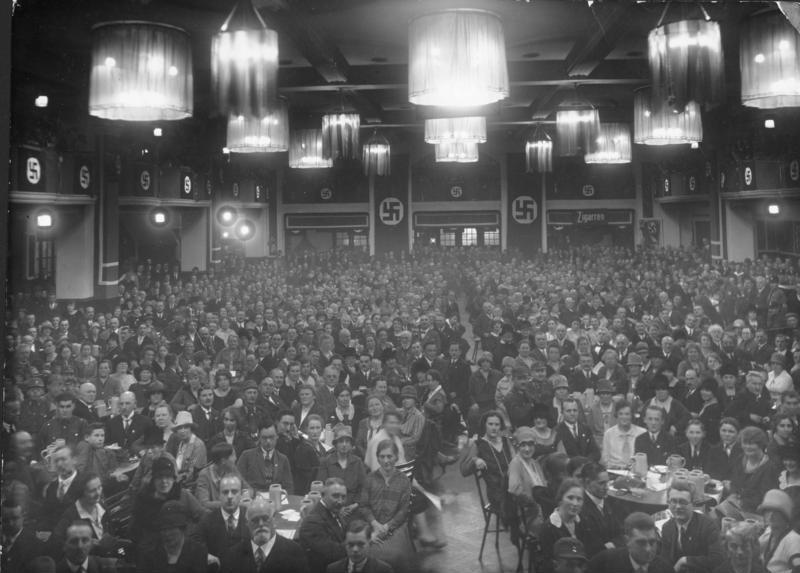
A meeting of the Nazi Party at the Bürgerbräukeller beer hall, circa 1923

The Bürgerbräukeller was located in the Haidhausen district of Munich on the east side of the Isar River. The entrance was from Rosenheimer Street, with rear access from Keller Street. Since 1980, the site has been redeveloped with the construction of the Gasteig Culture Centre, the Hilton Munich City Hotel and the headquarters of GEMA.

== Description ==
As early as the 16th century, brewers in Bavaria collected the barrels of beer near the end of the brewing season and stocked them in specially developed cellars for the summer. By the 18th century, brewers discovered they could make a greater profit if they opened their garden-topped cellars to the public and served the beer on site. In the 20th century, the Bürgerbräukeller had both a cellar and a beer garden, as well as the grand hall for indoor functions.

The grand hall was a rectangular space accommodating up to 3,000 people, though fewer in full dining mode. Pillars on either side of the hall supported narrow galleries and the roof. The load-bearing walls and the internal pillars with classical capitals were plastered brickwork. A decorative plastered ceiling, divided into bays with three rows of chandeliers, concealed steel beams supporting the timber roof structure.

== Nazi connection ==
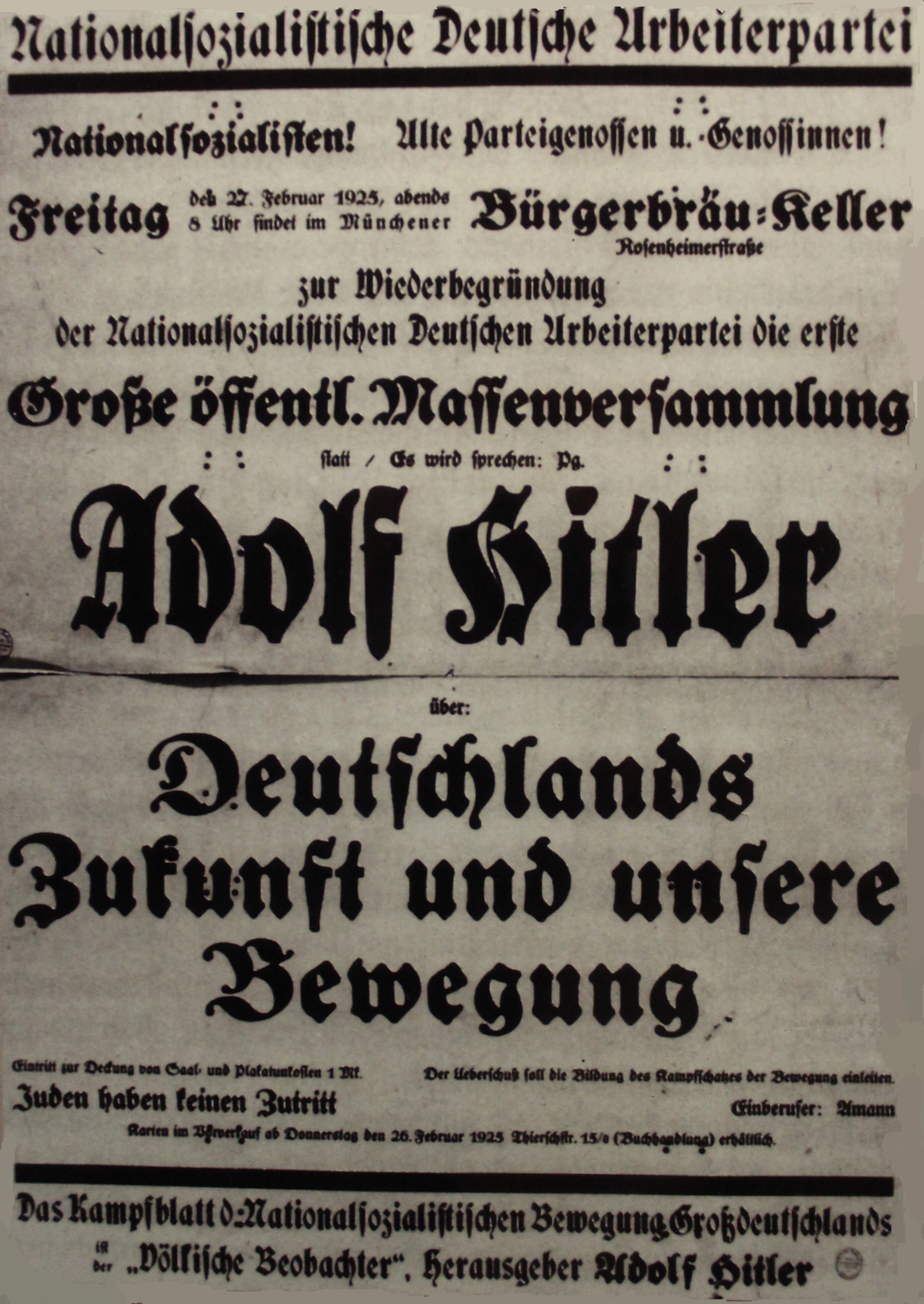
Invitation to a "re-establishment" of the Nazi party with Adolf Hitler as an orator, 27 February 1925, Munich, Bürgerbräukeller

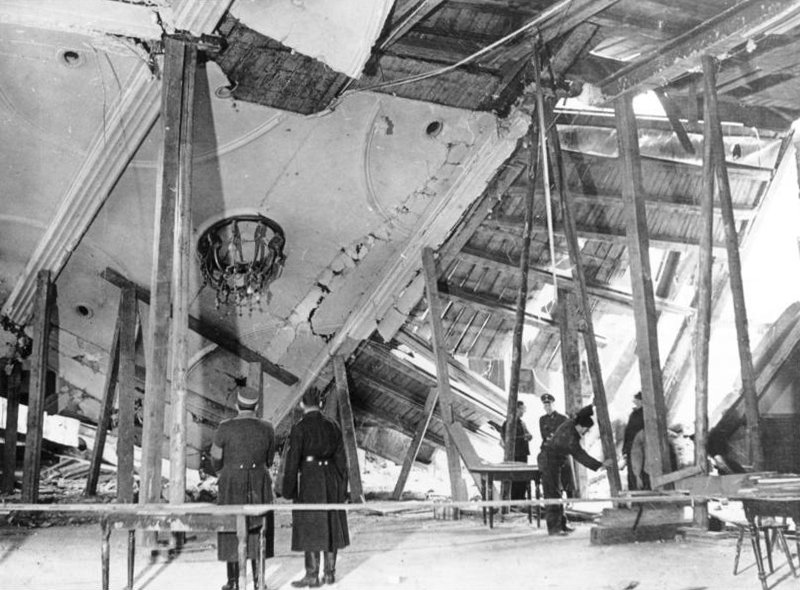
Bürgerbräukeller after the 1939 assassination attempt

From 1920 to 1923, the Bürgerbräukeller was one of the main gathering places of the Nazi Party. There, on 8 November 1923, Adolf Hitler launched the Beer Hall Putsch. After Hitler seized power in 1933, he commemorated each anniversary on the night of 8 November with an address to the Alte Kämpfer (Old Fighters) in the great hall of the Bürgerbräukeller. The following day, a re-enactment was conducted of the march through the streets of Munich from the Bürgerbräukeller to Königsplatz. The event climaxed with a ceremony at the Feldherrnhalle to revere the 16 'blood martyrs' of the Beer Hall Putsch.

The Bürgerbräukeller was also the site Hitler chose to publicly announce the re-establishment of the Nazi Party on 27 February 1925, some ten weeks after his release from Landsberg prison. With a sense of theater and symbolism, he returned in triumph to the scene of his failed putsch of sixteen months earlier. Three hours before his 8:00 p.m. speech, the hall was filled to capacity with 3,000 attendees and 2,000 more were turned away. Hitler spoke for two hours and reclaimed leadership of the Nazi movement, unifying the feuding factions that had led the fragmented organization while he was incarcerated.

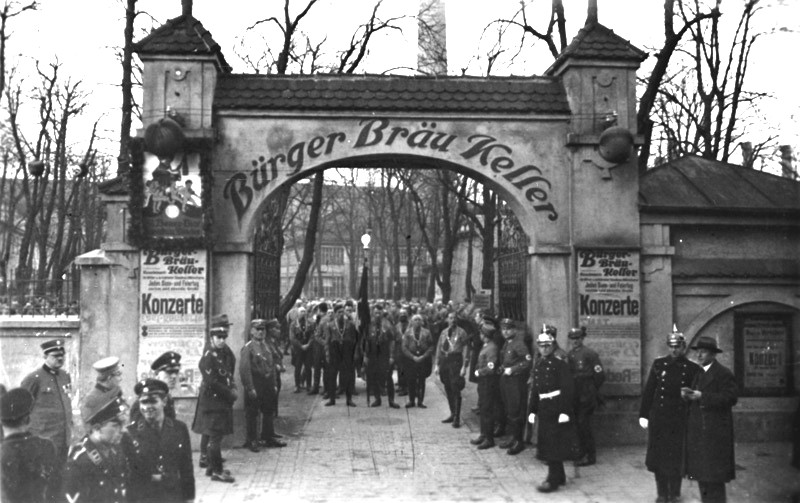
A Beer Hall Putsch march leaving the Bürgerbräukeller

In 1939, a time bomb concealed inside a pillar in the Bürgerbräukeller was set to go off during Hitler's Beer Hall Putsch address on 8 November. The bomb exploded, killing eight people and injuring 57, but Hitler had cut short his speech and had already left. A carpenter, Georg Elser, was arrested, imprisoned for 5 1/2 years, and executed shortly before the end of the war.

The building suffered severe structural damage from Elser's bomb, and in subsequent years, 1940–1943, the Beer Hall Putsch address was held at the Löwenbräukeller at Stiglmaierplatz, and in 1944 at the Circus Krone Building.

== During World War II ==
After the attempted assassination of Hitler on 8 November 1939, repairs began on the Bürgerbräukeller with the intention of repairing the building to its original state. Due to the shortage of materials, work was never completed. During the Allied aerial bombing of Munich, a single bomb hit the hall where the 1939 explosion had taken place, but failed to explode.

== After World War II ==
When American forces entered Munich on 30 April 1945, the 42nd ‘Rainbow’ Infantry Division found the Bürgerbräukeller filthy, piled with Nazi Party records, and unused.

The Bürgerbräukeller served as an American Red Cross Club starting in late 1945 and became a Special Services club in September 1947. An average of 1,700 servicemen made use of the club's facilities every day. The Bürgerbräukeller was one of nine service clubs in the Munich Military Post.

With the departure of American forces in 1957, the Bürgerbräukeller was taken over by Löwenbräu beer company, and after partial rebuilding, it was reopened as a bierkeller at Christmas 1958.

In preparation for the 1972 Olympic Games in Munich, the city authorities undertook the construction of an underground railway system. The construction of station escalators emerging on Rosenheimerstrasse, next to the Bürgerbräukeller, required the cellar, which had been used for Nazi Party meetings, to be sealed off. In 1976, the great hall at the rear was still available for large gatherings.

In the 1970s, it was in use also as a recording studio and Carlos Kleiber's La Traviata was recorded there in 1976.

The Bürgerbräukeller was demolished in 1979 in a redevelopment programme, as were the nearby Münchner-Kindl-Keller and the Hofbräu brewery.

On the Bürgerbräukeller site now stands the GEMA building, the Gasteig Cultural Centre, and the Munich City Hilton Hotel.

== Georg Elser plaque ==
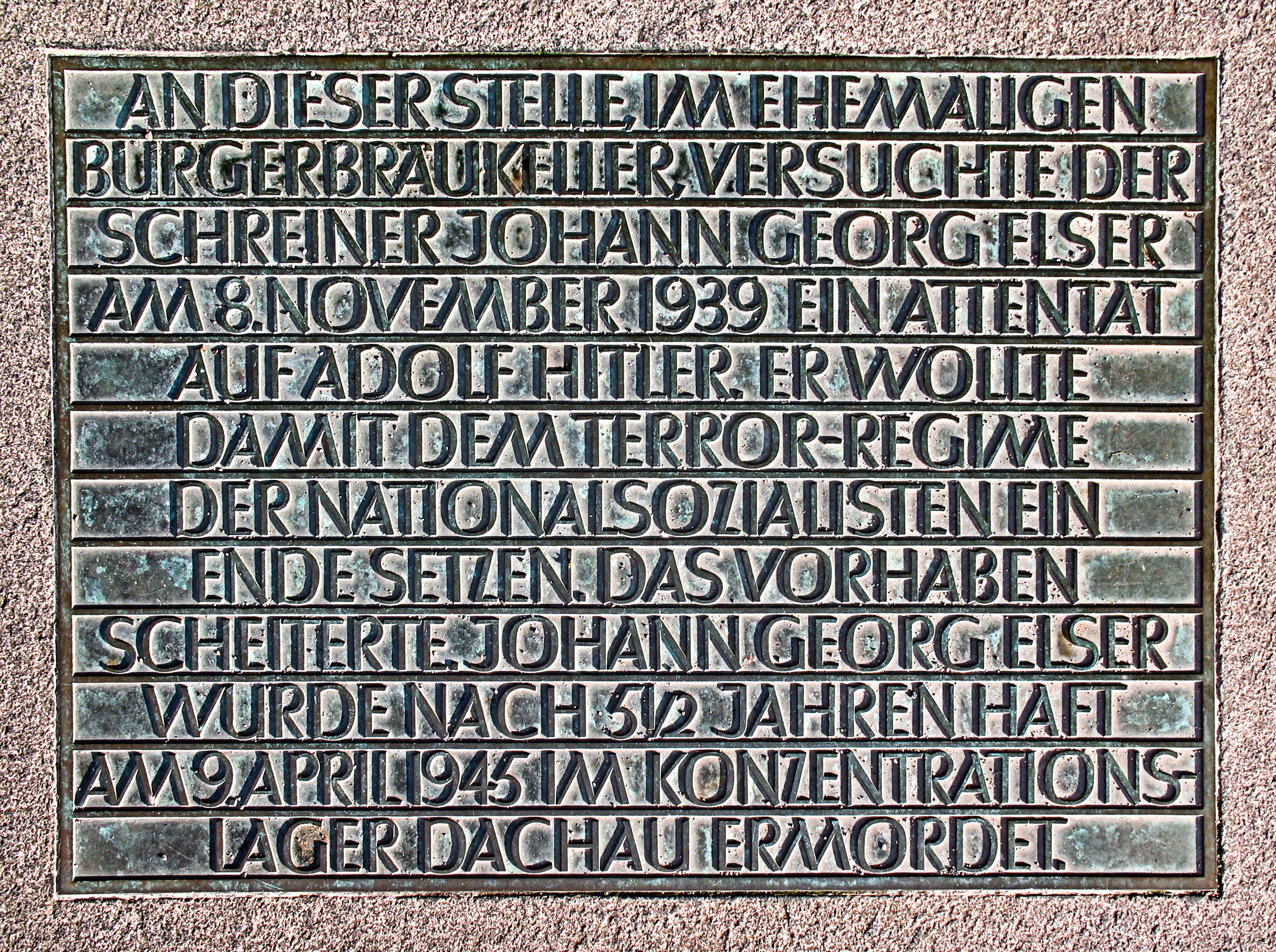
Georg Elser plaque

Near the entrance to the GEMA building, a plaque in the pavement marks the position of the pillar that concealed Georg Elser's bomb in his attempt to assassinate Adolf Hitler.
