= Voorne aan Zee =

Island municipality in South Holland province, Netherlands

- Municipality
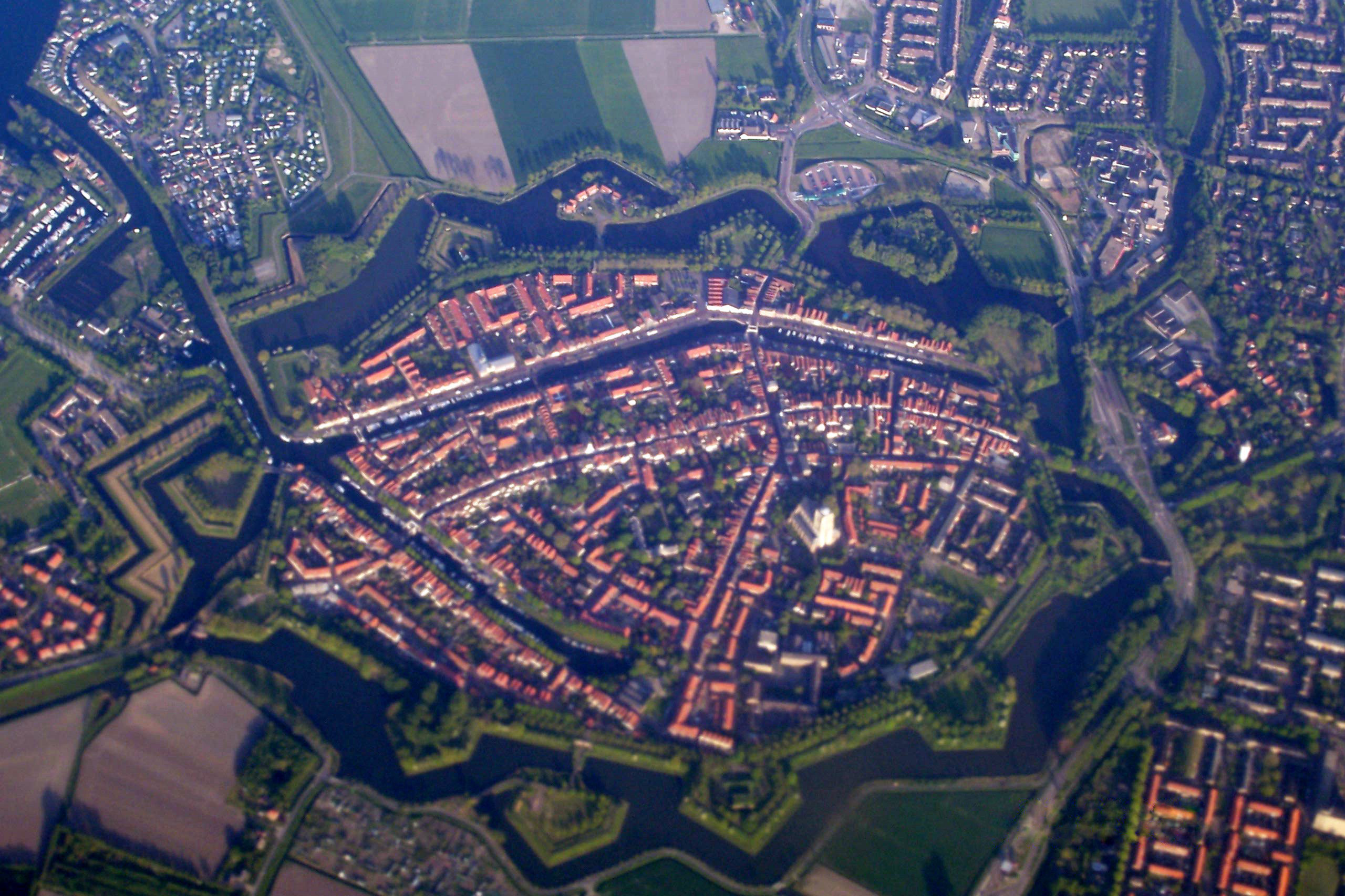
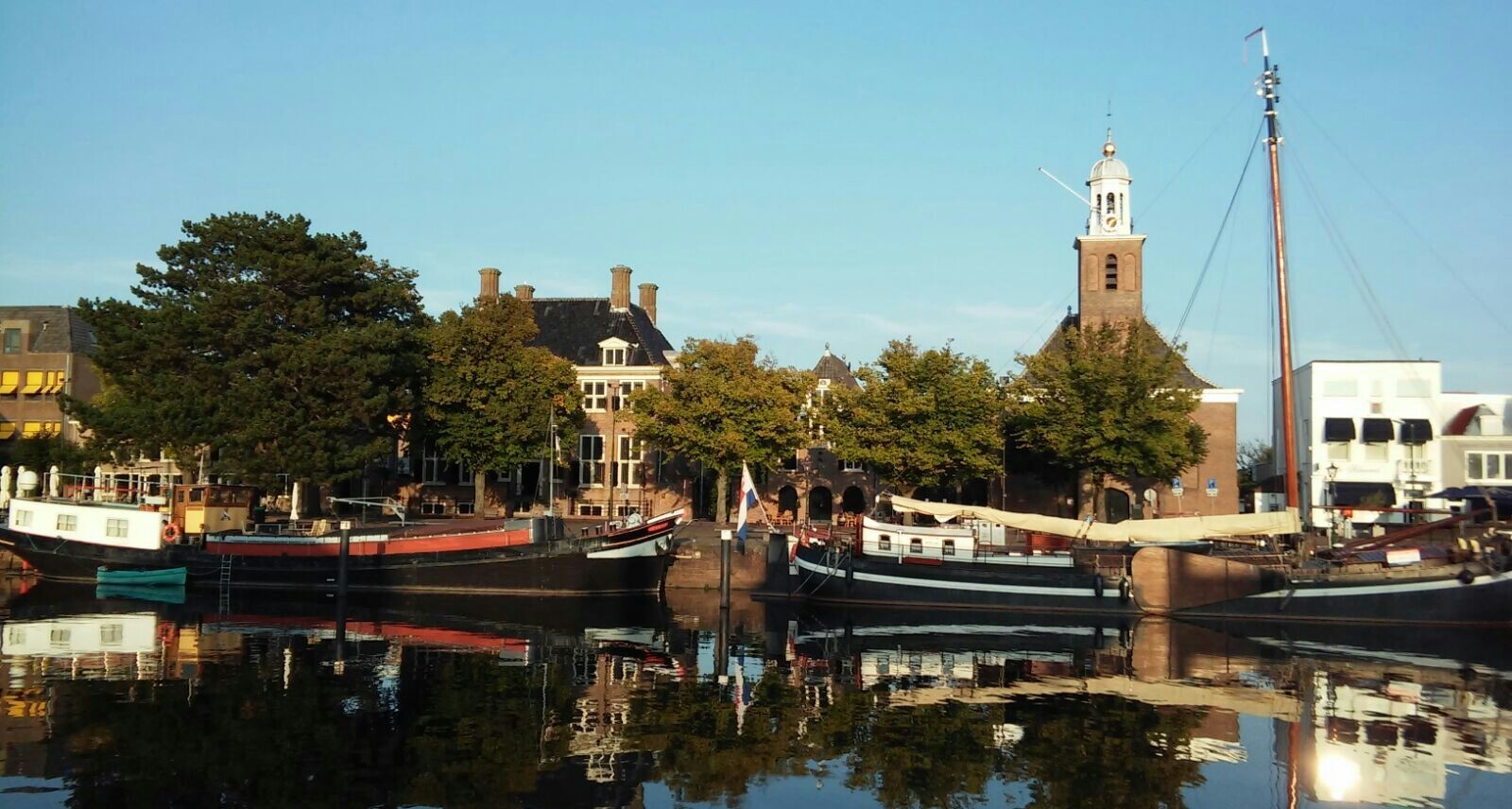
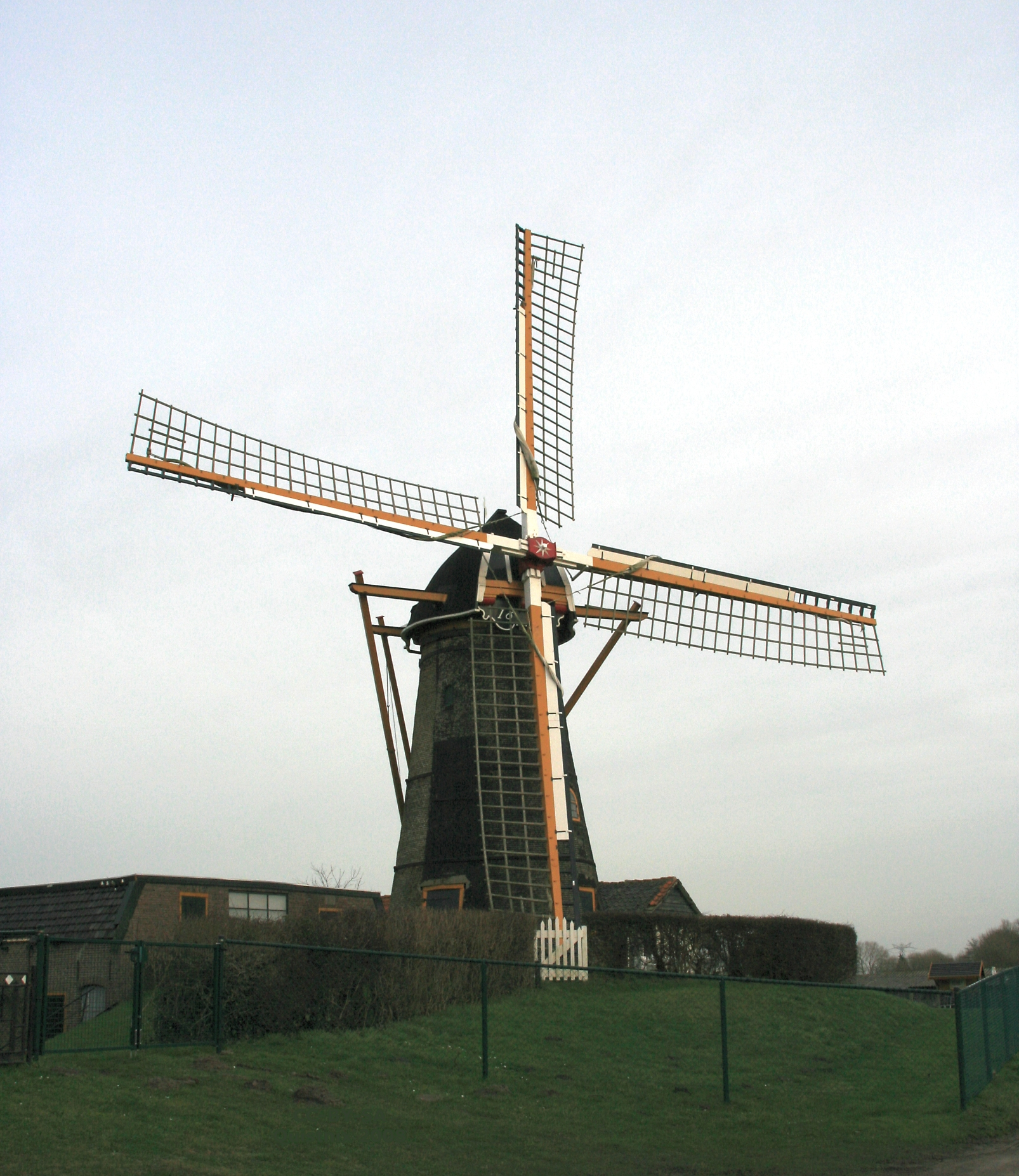
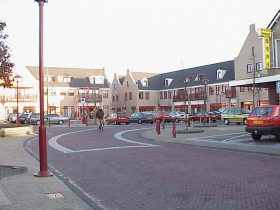
- Historic town centre of Brielle Harbour of Hellevoetsluis Corn mill of Oostvoorne Village centre of Rockanje

- Flag Coat of arms

- Location in South Holland
- Coordinates: 51°52′N 4°4′E
- Country: Netherlands
- Province: South Holland
- Established: 1 January 2023

Government
  - Body: Municipal council
  - Mayor: Peter Rehwinkel (PvdA)

Area
  - Total: 189.82 km^{2} (73.29 sq mi)
  - Land: 121.83 km^{2} (47.04 sq mi)
  - Water: 67.99 km^{2} (26.25 sq mi)
- Elevation: 0 m (0 ft)

Population (November 2022)
  - Total: 73,873
- Time zone: UTC+1 (CET)
  - Summer (DST): UTC+2 (CEST)
- Postcode: 3220-3225, 3227, 3230-3235
- Area code: 0181
- Website: www.voorneaanzee.nl

Voorne aan Zee (Dutch pronunciation: [ˈvoːrnə ʔaːn ˈzeː]) is a municipality on the island of Voorne-Putten in the western Netherlands, in the province of South Holland. The municipality covers an area of 189.82 km^{2} (73.29 sq mi) of which 67.99 km^{2} (26.25 sq mi) is water. It had a population of 73,873 in 2022.

The municipality of Voorne aan Zee was formed on 1 January 2023, through the merger of the former municipalities of Brielle, Hellevoetsluis and Westvoorne, which itself was formed on 1 January 1980, through the merger of the former municipalities Oostvoorne and Rockanje.

It consists of the towns Brielle and Hellevoetsluis, the villages Nieuwenhoorn, Nieuw-Helvoet, Oostvoorne, Oudenhoorn, Rockanje, Tinte, Vierpolders and Zwartewaal, the water board neighbourhood Oude en Nieuwe Struiten, and the hamlet Helhoek.

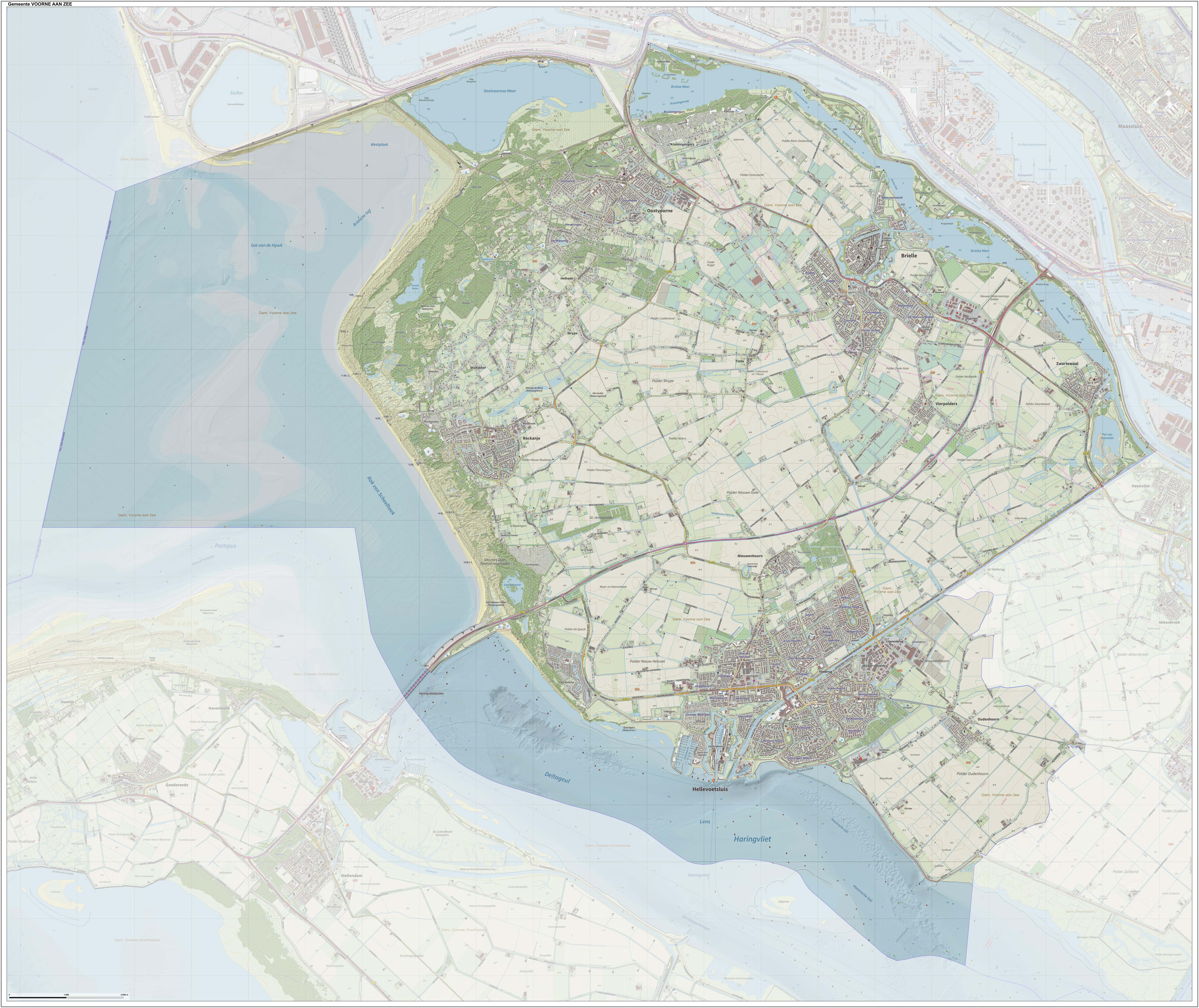
Topographic map of Voorne aan Zee, January 2023

== Notable people ==
- Jacob van Maerlant (ca.1230–40 – ca.1288–1300), a Flemish poet of the 13th century, an important Middle Dutch author of the Middle Ages
- Maarten Tromp (1598 in Brielle – 1653), a Dutch army general and admiral in the Dutch navy
- Witte de With (1599 in Hoogendijk – 1658), a Dutch naval officer during the Eighty Years War and the First Anglo-Dutch War
- Volkert Simon Maarten van der Willigen (1822–1878), a Dutch mathematician, physicist and professor
- Jan Greshoff (1888 in Nieuw-Helvoet – 1971), a Dutch journalist, poet, and literary critic
- Belinda Meuldijk (born 1955), a Dutch actress, writer, and activist
- Meindert van Buuren (born 1995), a Dutch racing driver

== Gallery ==
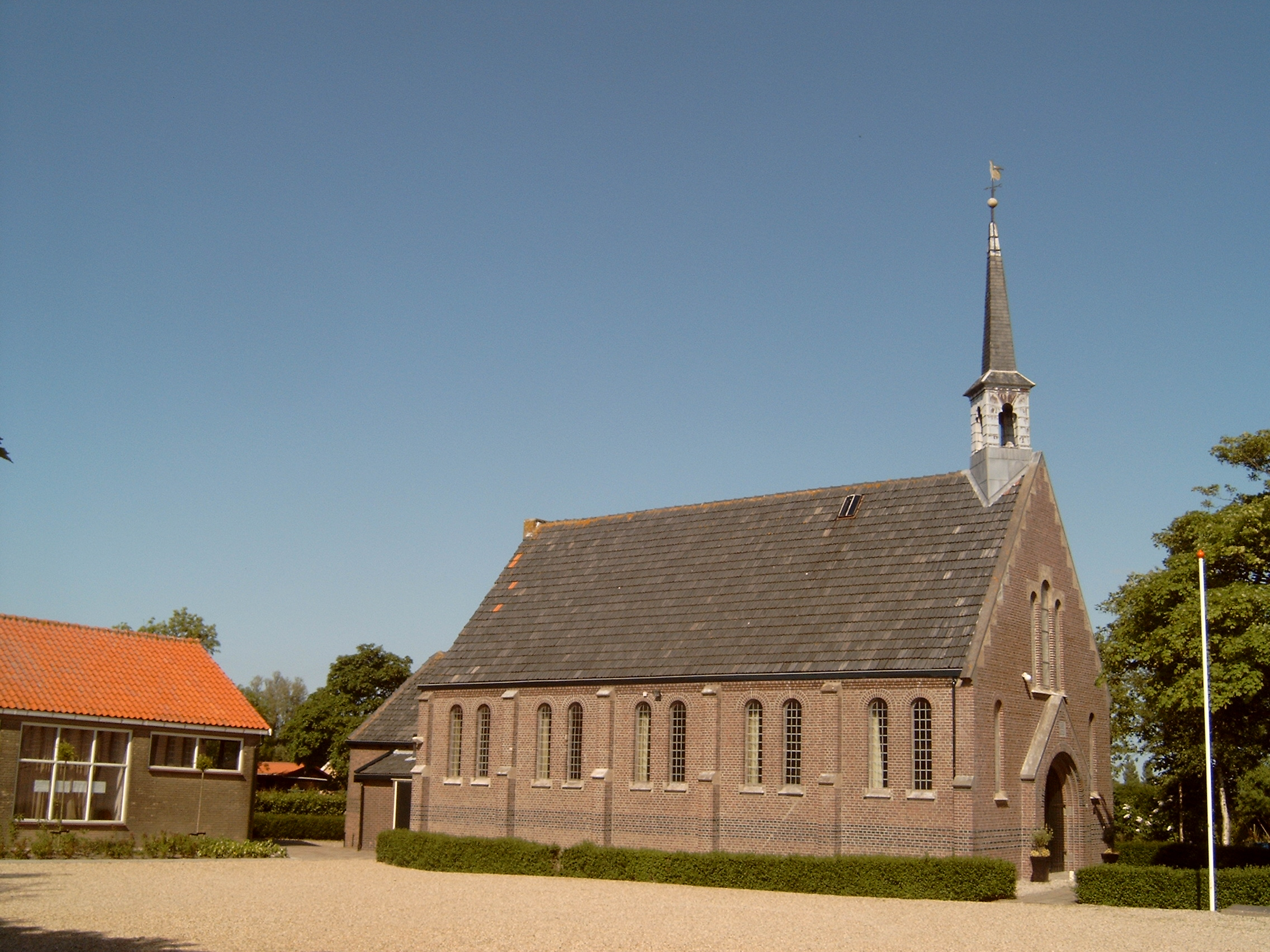
Tinte, chapel

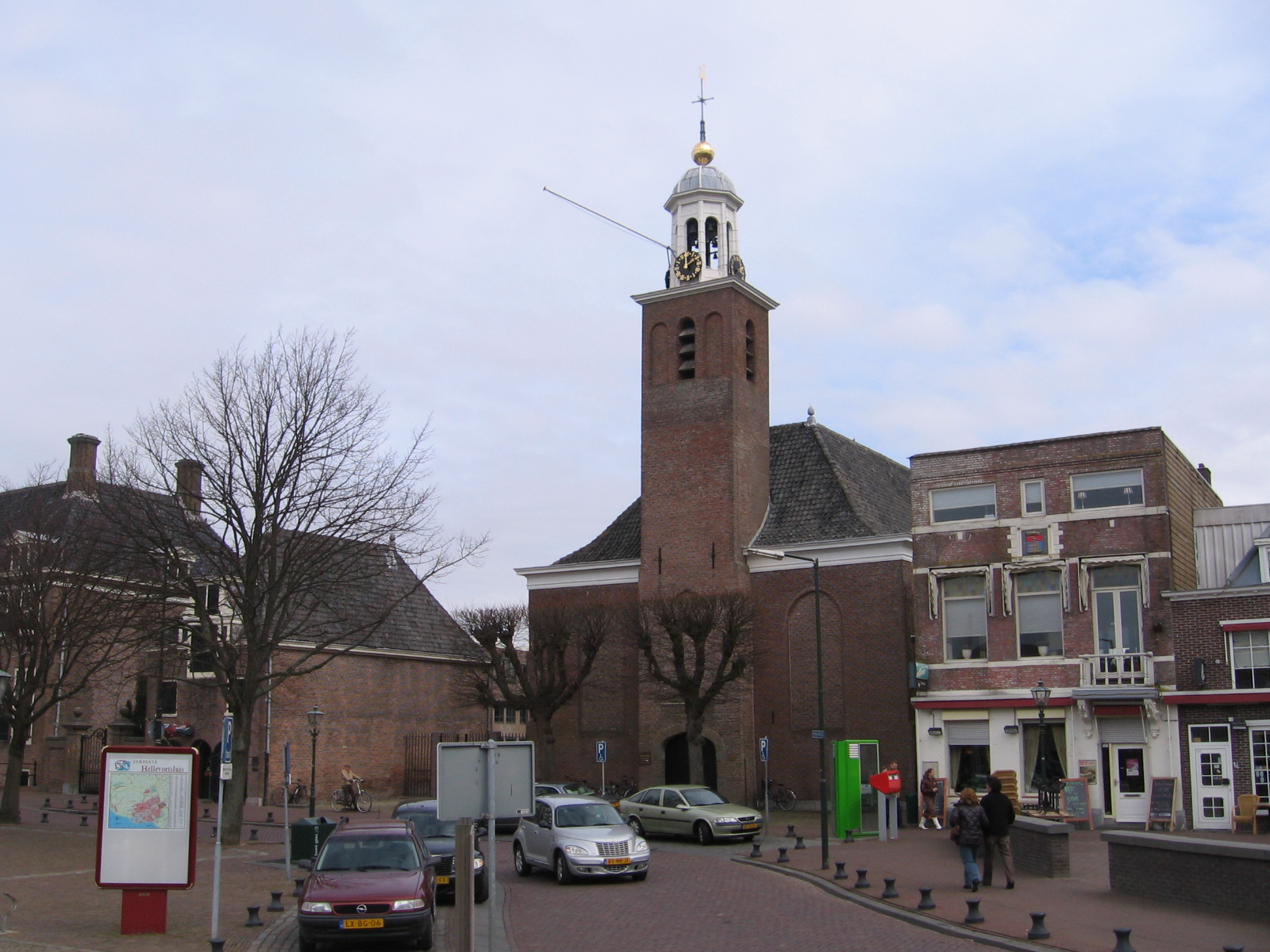
Church in Hellevoetsluis

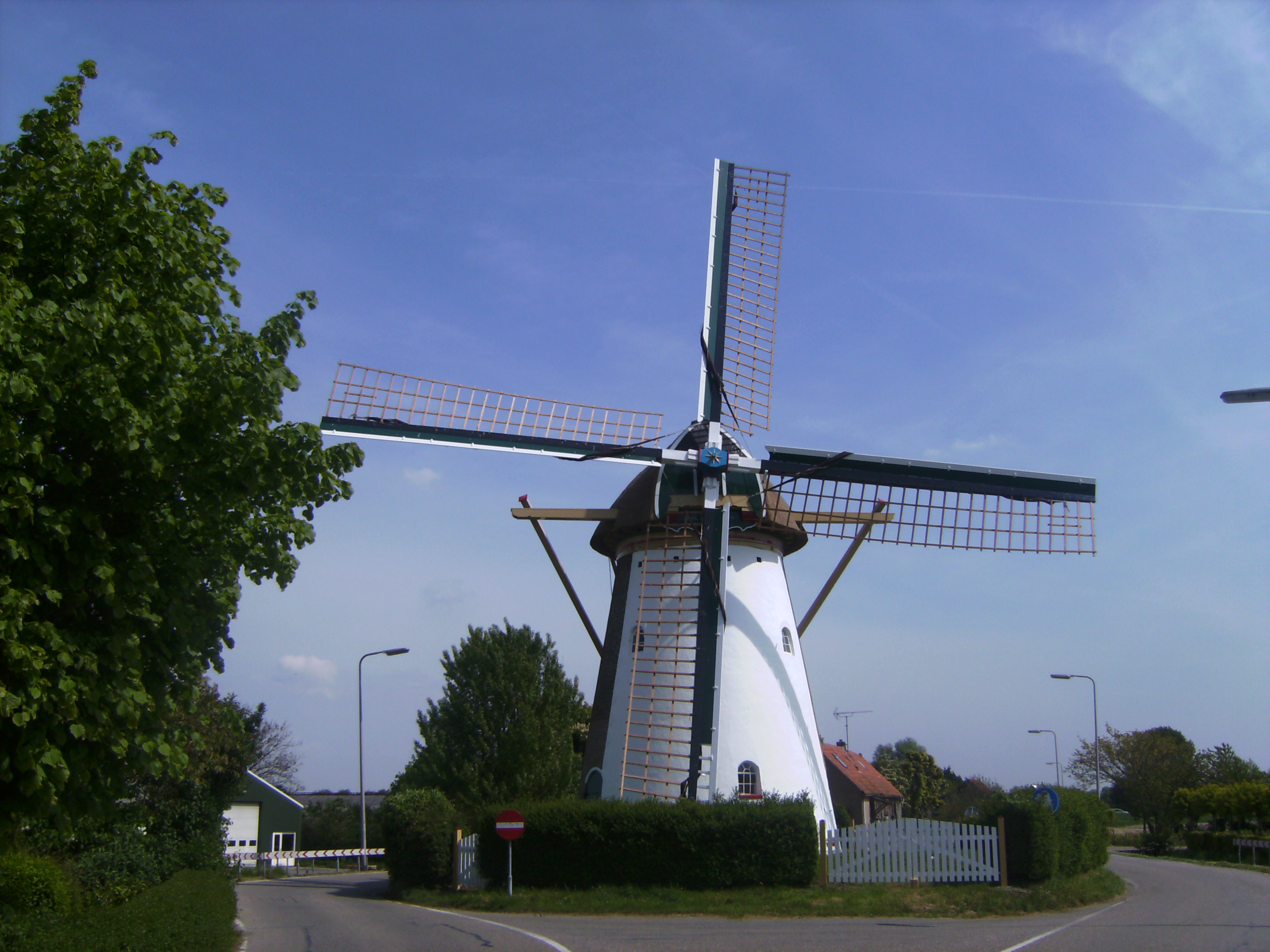
Rockanje, windmill

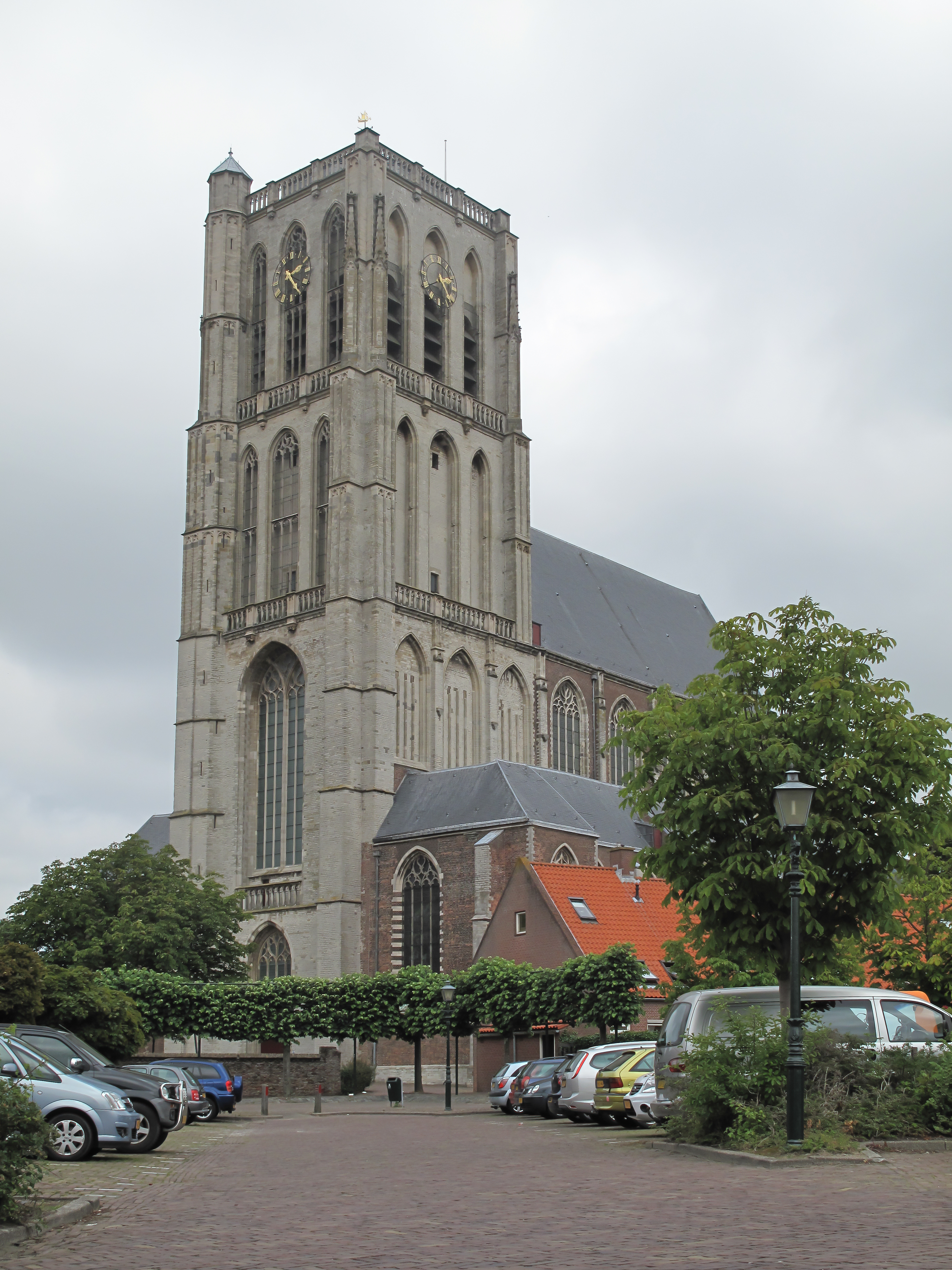
Brielle, church: de Sint Catharijne kerk

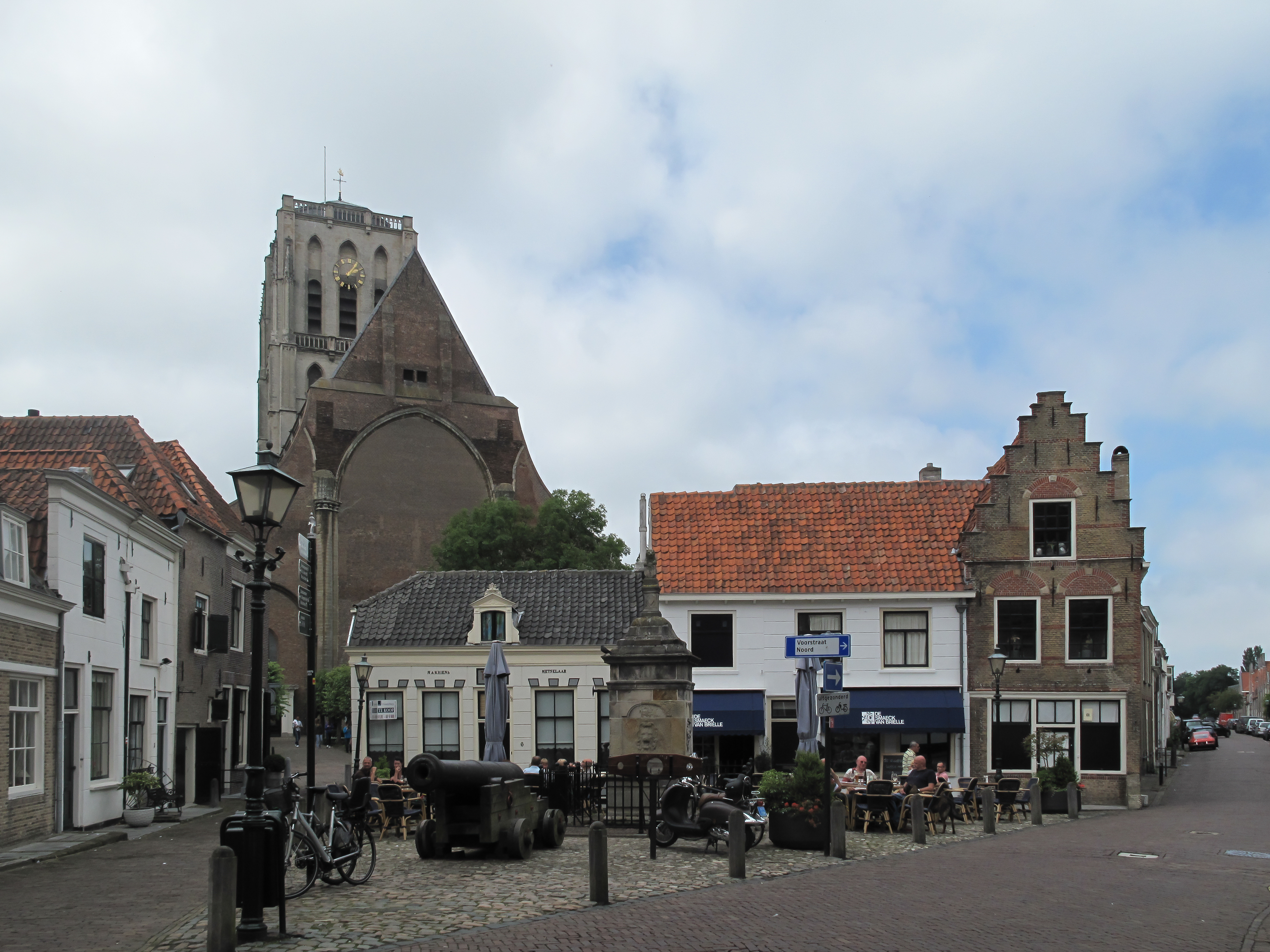
Brielle, monumental houses at the Wellerondom

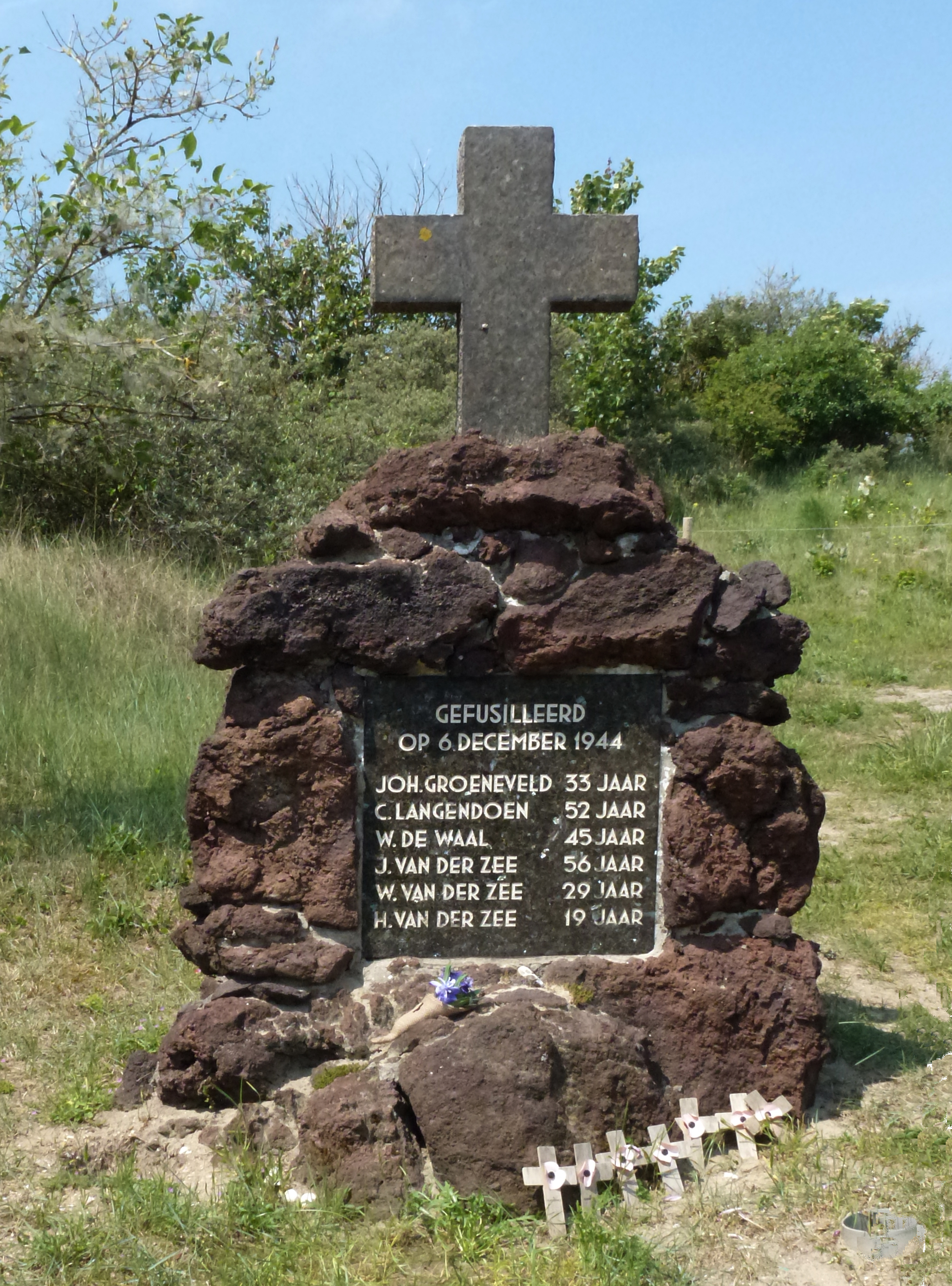
Tweede Slag, Rockanje. Monument honouring executed resistance members during WWII.
