= Westvoorne =

Island municipality in South Holland province, Netherlands

- Former municipality
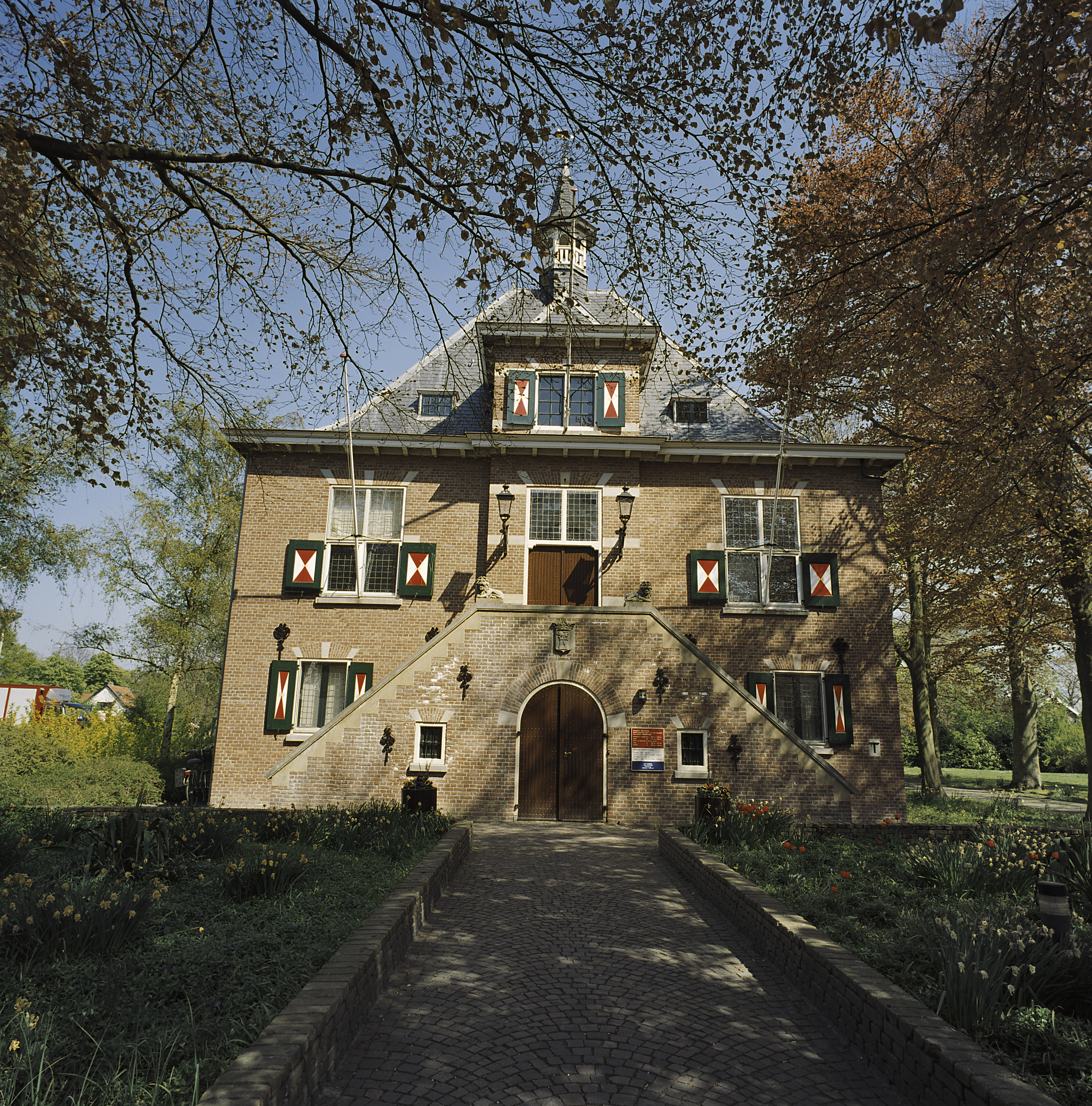
- Former city hall of Oostvoorne

- Flag Coat of arms

- Location in South Holland
- Coordinates: 51°52′N 4°4′E
- Country: Netherlands
- Province: South Holland
- Municipality: Voorne aan Zee

Area
  - Total: 97.48 km^{2} (37.64 sq mi)
  - Land: 53.18 km^{2} (20.53 sq mi)
  - Water: 44.30 km^{2} (17.10 sq mi)
- Elevation: 0 m (0 ft)

Population (January 2021)
  - Total: 14,900
  - Density: 280/km^{2} (730/sq mi)
- Time zone: UTC+1 (CET)
  - Summer (DST): UTC+2 (CEST)
- Postcode: 3233–3235
- Area code: 0181
- Website: www.westvoorne.nl

Westvoorne is a former municipality on the island of Voorne-Putten in the western Netherlands, in the province of South Holland. The former municipality covered an area of 97.48 km^{2} (37.64 sq mi) of which 44.30 km^{2} (17.10 sq mi) was water. It had a population of 14,900 in 2021.

The municipality of Westvoorne was formed on 1 January 1980, through the merger of the former municipalities of Oostvoorne and Rockanje. It consisted of the population centres of Oostvoorne, Rockanje, Tinte and Helhoek.

On 1 January 2023, the municipality of Westvoorne merged with Brielle and Hellevoetsluis into the new municipality of Voorne aan Zee.

== Trivia ==
In 2011, Westvoorne received the QualityCoast Gold Award for its efforts to become a sustainable tourism destination. Because of this award Westvoorne had been selected for inclusion in the global atlas for sustainable tourism DestiNet.

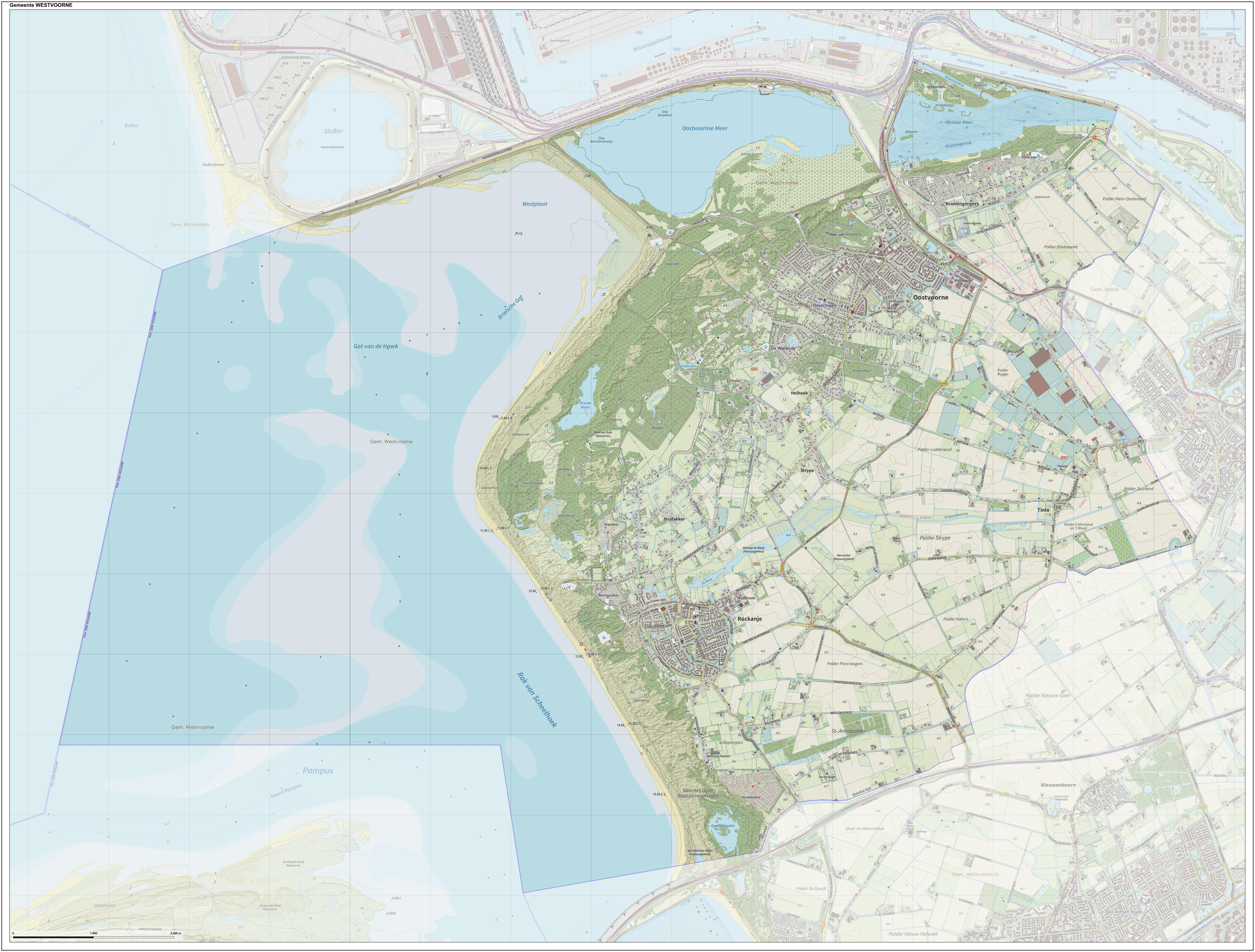
Dutch Topographic map of Westvoorne, September 2022

== Notable people ==
- Jacob van Maerlant (ca.1230–40 – ca.1288–1300) Flemish poet of the 13th century, an important Middle Dutch author of the Middle Ages
- Volkert Simon Maarten van der Willigen (1822–1878) Dutch mathematician, physicist and professor
- Belinda Meuldijk (born 1955) Dutch actress, writer, and activist
- Meindert van Buuren (born 1995) Dutch racing driver

== Gallery ==
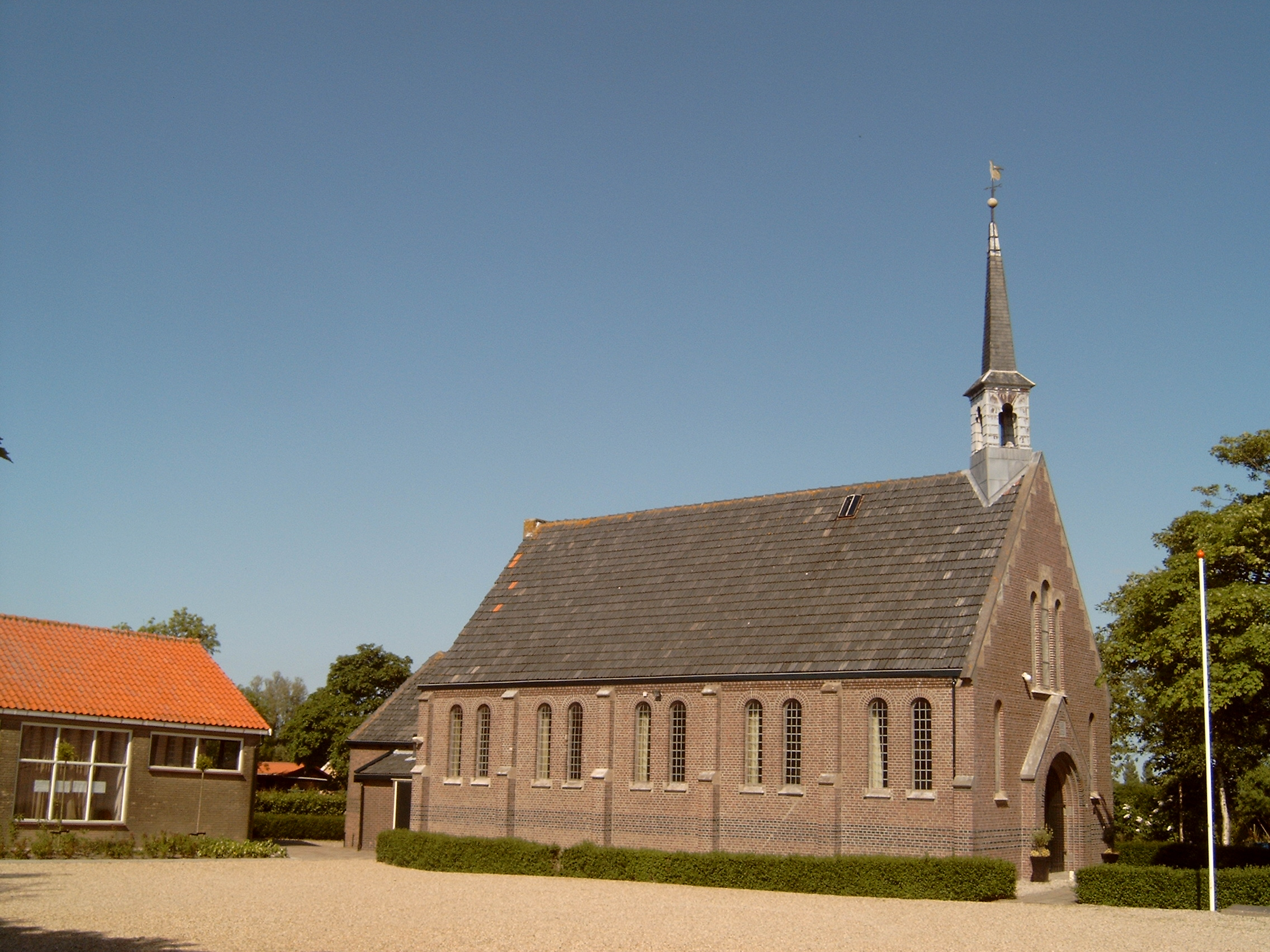
Tinte, chapel

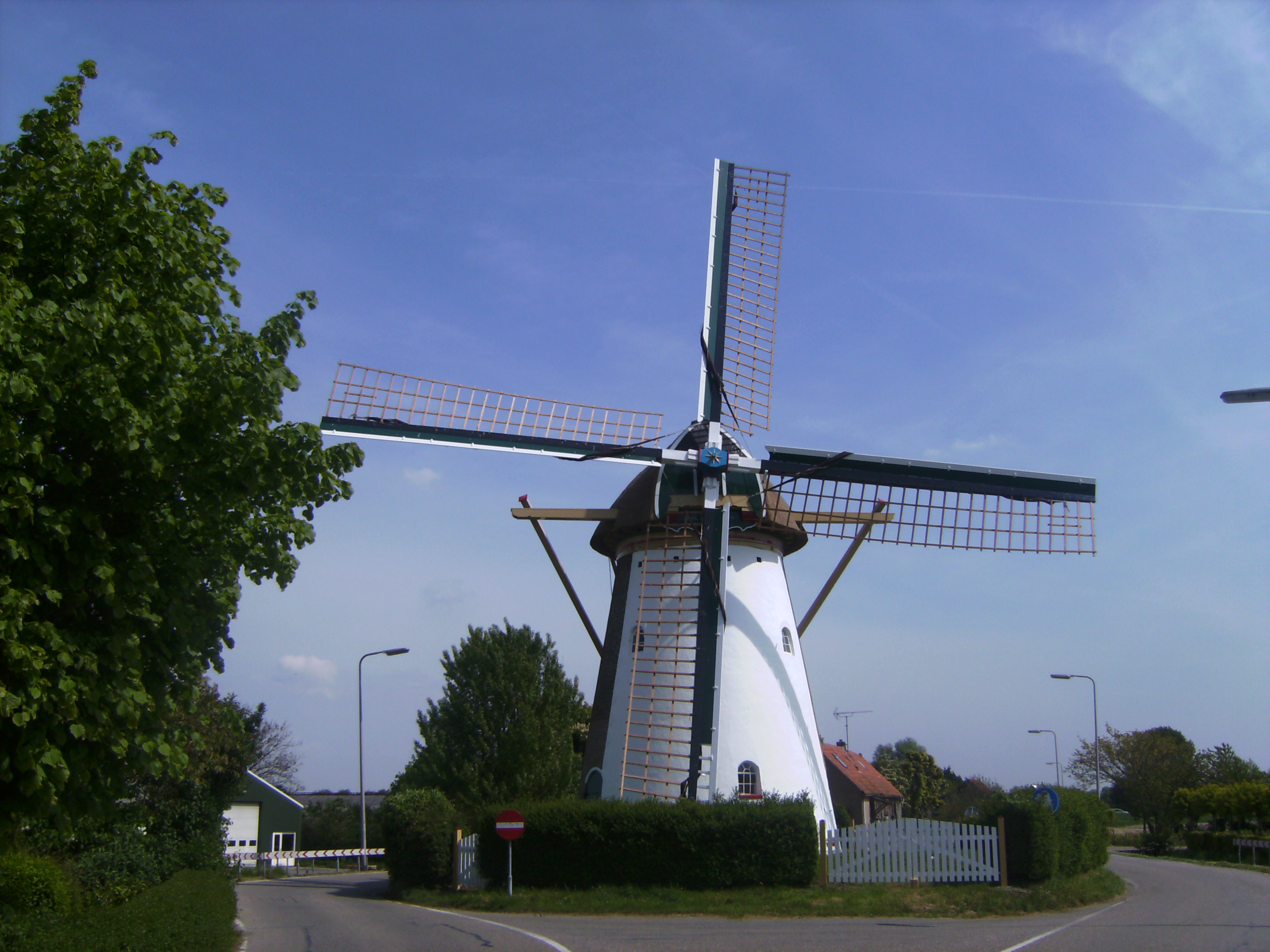
Rockanje, windmill

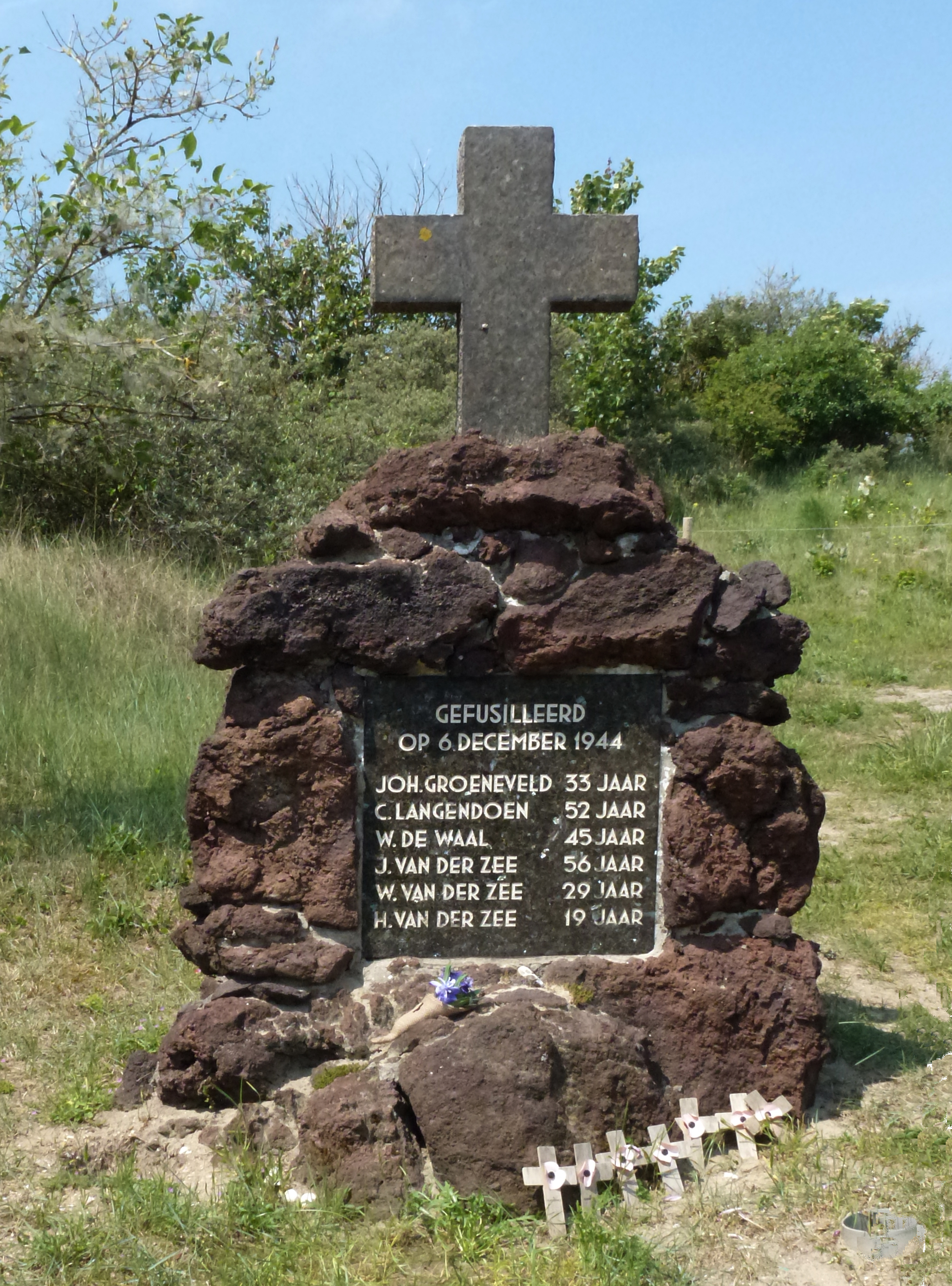
Tweede Slag, Rockanje. Oorlogsmonument in de duinen
