= Tinte =

- Village
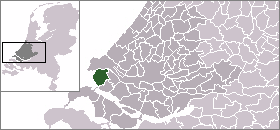

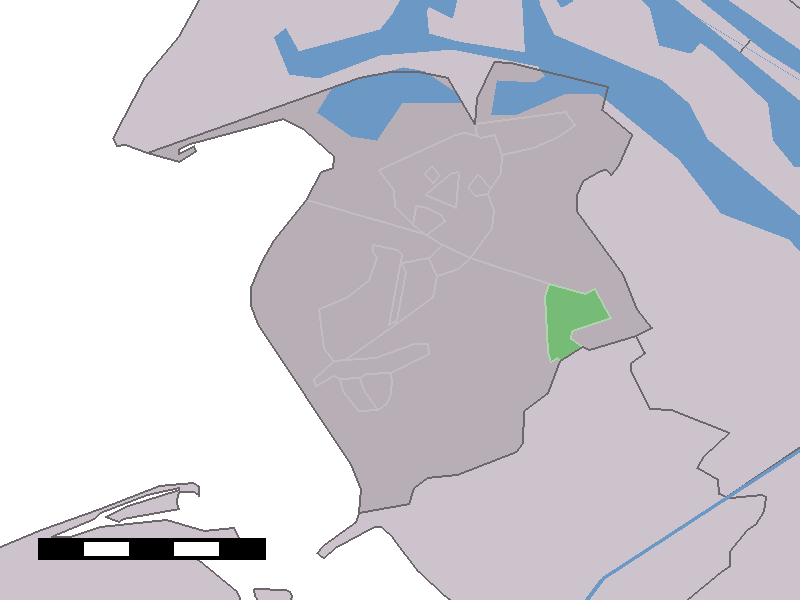
- Tinte in the former municipality of Westvoorne.
- Coordinates: 51°53′N 4°8′E
- Country: Netherlands
- Province: South Holland
- Municipality: Voorne aan Zee

Population
  - Total: 576
- Time zone: UTC+1 (CET)
  - Summer (DST): UTC+2 (CEST)

Tinte is a village in the Dutch province of South Holland. It is a part of the municipality of Voorne aan Zee, and lies about 6 km north of Hellevoetsluis.

The statistical area "Tinte", which also can include the surrounding countryside, has a population of around 537 (2011).
