= Helhoek, South Holland =

Helhoek
- Hamlet
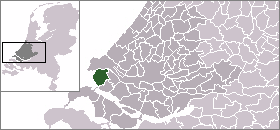

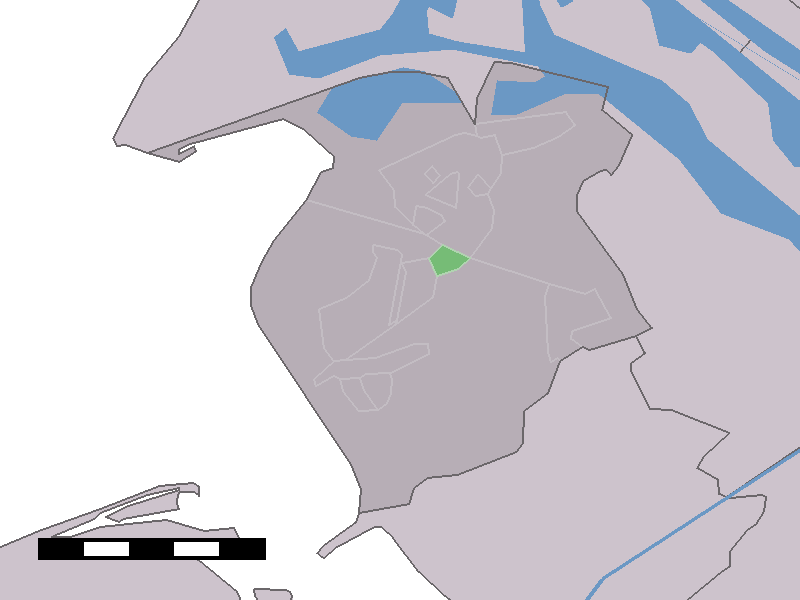
- Helhoek in the former municipality of Westvoorne.
- Coordinates: 51°53′54″N 4°05′25″E
- Country: Netherlands
- Province: South Holland
- Municipality: Voorne aan Zee

Population (2007)
  - Total: 170
- Time zone: UTC+1 (CET)
  - Summer (DST): UTC+2 (CEST)

Helhoek is a hamlet in the Dutch province of South Holland. It is a part of the municipality of Voorne aan Zee, and lies about 8 km north of Hellevoetsluis.

The statistical area "Helhoek", which also can include the surrounding countryside, has a population of around 50.
