= Zwartewaal =

Town in South Holland, Netherlands

- Village
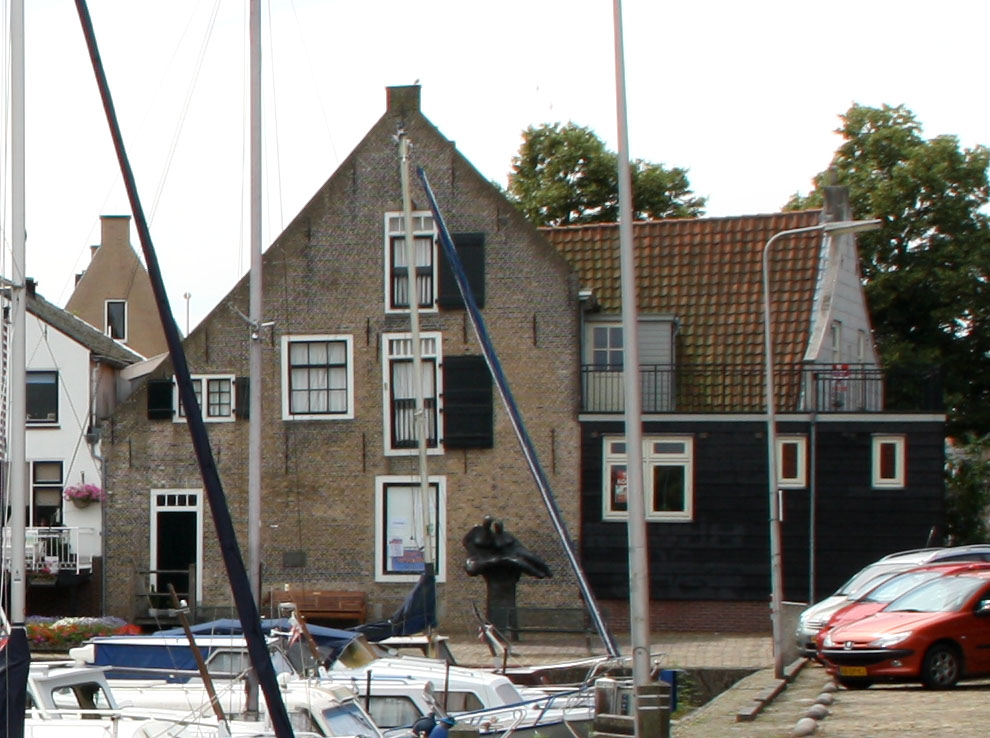
- Warehouse in Zwartewaal

- Flag Coat of arms

- Location in the province of South Holland in the Netherlands Location in the Netherlands
- Coordinates: 51°53′N 4°13′E
- Country: Netherlands
- Province: South Holland
- Municipality: Voorne aan Zee

Area
  - Total: 9.52 km^{2} (3.68 sq mi)
- Elevation: 0.2 m (0.66 ft)

Population (2021)
  - Total: 1,905
  - Density: 200/km^{2} (518/sq mi)
- Time zone: UTC+1 (CET)
  - Summer (DST): UTC+2 (CEST)
- Postal code: 3238
- Dialing code: 0181

Zwartewaal is a village in the Dutch province of South Holland, The Netherlands. It is a part of the municipality of Voorne aan Zee and lies about 5 km south of Maassluis.

== History ==
The village was first mentioned in the middle of the 13th century as "ten Zwarten Wale", and means "black (water) pond created after a dike breech". Zwartewaal is dike village which developed after 1180 when the Zwartewaal polder was created. A fishing harbour was constructed outside the dike. On 5 July 1351, the Battle of Zwartewaal was fought where William I, Duke of Bavaria defeated his mother and became count of Holland. Mother and son made peace in 1354.

The Dutch Reformed church is a single aisled church from the 15th century. The tower was built in 1597. The church is built on a terp (artificial hill) and is located outside of the village centre, because the village relocated due to flooding.

Zwartewaal was home to 1,006 people in 1840. It was a separate municipality between 1817 and 1980, when it became part of Brielle.

== Gallery ==
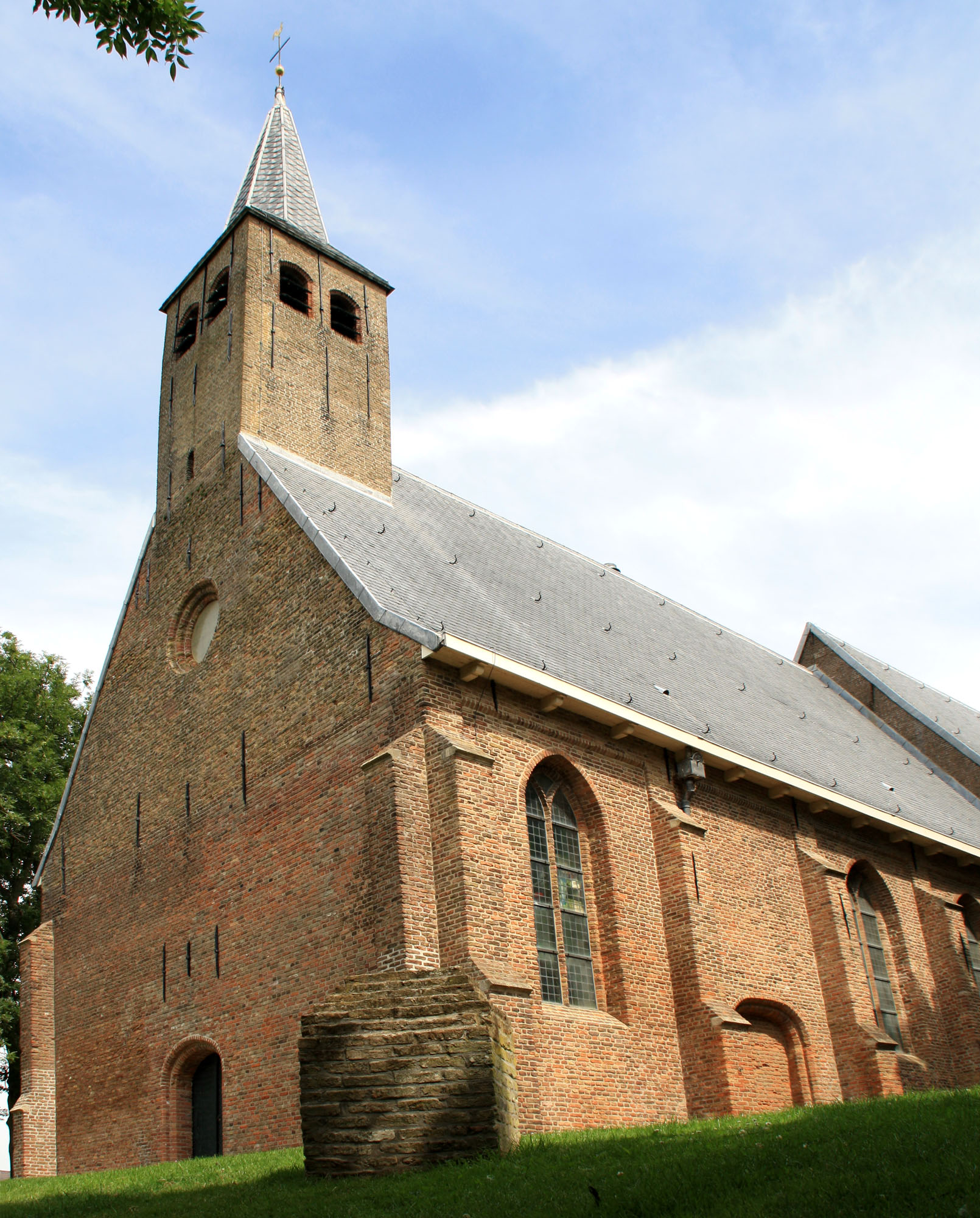
Dutch Reformed church

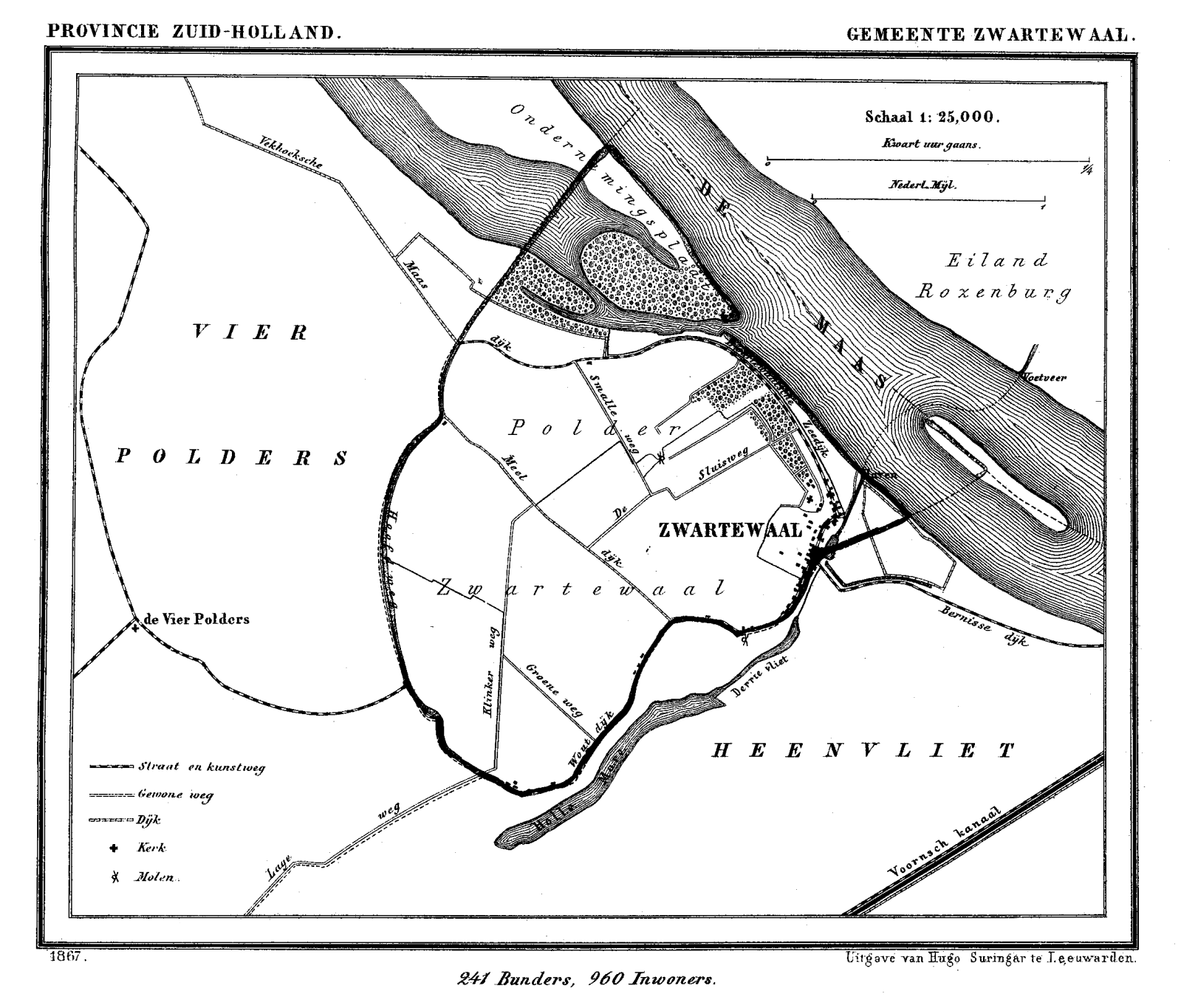
Zwartewaal and surroundings from Gemeente Atlas van Nederland by J. Kuyper, 1867
