= 2015 Formula Renault 3.5 Series =

Motor racing season

The 2015 Formula Renault 3.5 Series season was a multi-event motor racing championship for open wheel, formula racing cars held across Europe. The championship featured drivers competing in Formula Renault 3.5 formula race cars that conformed to the technical regulations for the championship. The 2015 season was the eleventh and final season Formula Renault 3.5 Series organised by Renault Sport, after it was announced that the organisation would withdraw its backing of the championship at the end of the season.

The season began at Motorland Aragón on 25 April and finished on 18 October at Circuito de Jerez. The series formed part of the World Series by Renault meetings at seven double header events, with an additional double header event at the Red Bull Ring and a single race at Monaco, in support of the Monaco Grand Prix.

== Teams and drivers ==
Team	No.	Driver name	Status	Rounds
(France) DAMS	1	(Netherlands) Nyck de Vries	R	All
(France) DAMS	2	(United Kingdom) Dean Stoneman	R	All
(United Kingdom) Fortec Motorsports	3	(Malaysia) Jazeman Jaafar		All
(United Kingdom) Fortec Motorsports	4	(United Kingdom) Oliver Rowland		All
(United Kingdom) Arden Motorsport	5	(Canada) Nicholas Latifi		All
(United Kingdom) Arden Motorsport	6	(Russia) Egor Orudzhev	R	All
(Czech Republic) Lotus	9	(France) Matthieu Vaxivière		All
(Czech Republic) Lotus	10	(Netherlands) Meindert van Buuren		1–4
(Czech Republic) Lotus	10	(Philippines) Marlon Stöckinger		5, 7–9
(Czech Republic) Lotus	10	(United Kingdom) Nick Yelloly		6
(United Kingdom) Strakka Racing	11	(Cyprus) Tio Ellinas	R	All
(United Kingdom) Strakka Racing	12	(Sweden) Gustav Malja	R	All
(Spain) AVF	15	(Mexico) Alfonso Celis Jr.	R	All
(Spain) AVF	16	(Netherlands) Beitske Visser		All
(France) Tech 1 Racing	17	(Israel) Roy Nissany	R	All
(France) Tech 1 Racing	18	(France) Aurélien Panis	R	All
(Italy) International Draco Racing	19	(Brazil) Pietro Fantin		1–7
(Italy) International Draco Racing	19	(Brazil) André Negrão		8
(Italy) International Draco Racing	20	(Brazil) Bruno Bonifacio	R	1–7
(Italy) International Draco Racing	20	(Brazil) André Negrão		9
(United Kingdom) Comtec Racing	21	(Switzerland) Louis Delétraz	R	5
(United Kingdom) Jagonya Ayam with Carlin	25	(Indonesia) Sean Gelael	R	All
(United Kingdom) Jagonya Ayam with Carlin	26	(France) Tom Dillmann		All
(Spain) Pons Racing	39	(Indonesia) Philo Paz Armand	R	1–4, 6
(Spain) Pons Racing	39	(Netherlands) Meindert van Buuren		5
(Spain) Pons Racing	39	(Japan) Yu Kanamaru	R	7–9
(Spain) Pons Racing	40	(Spain) Roberto Merhi		1, 3–5
(Spain) Pons Racing	40	(Switzerland) Alex Fontana	R	2
(Spain) Pons Racing	40	(United Kingdom) Will Bratt	R	6
(Spain) Pons Racing	40	(Austria) René Binder		7
(Spain) Pons Racing	40	(Russia) Nikita Zlobin	R	8–9

Icon	Meaning
R	Series rookie for 2015

=== Driver changes ===
Changed teams

- After competing for Tech 1 Racing at the Nürburgring during the 2014 season, Alfonso Celis Jr. switched to AVF for a full 2015 campaign.
- Jazeman Jaafar switched from ISR Racing to Fortec Motorsports.
- Nicholas Latifi, who competed in three rounds in 2014 for Tech 1 Racing, joined Arden Motorsport for a full-time campaign in 2015.
- Roberto Merhi switched from Zeta Corse to Pons Racing. He had also signed a short-term contract to race in Formula One for the Manor F1 Team.
- Meindert van Buuren switched from Pons Racing to Lotus.

Entering/Re–Entering FR3.5

- Formula Renault 2.0 Alps driver Philo Paz Armand made his Formula Renault 3.5 début with Pons Racing.
- Bruno Bonifacio, who graduated from Eurocup Formula Renault 2.0, joined the series with International Draco Racing.
- Tom Dillmann, who raced in the GP2 Series and Porsche Carrera Cup France in 2014, moved to the series with Carlin, alongside newcomer Sean Gelael, who graduated from the FIA European Formula 3 Championship.
- Tio Ellinas moved from the GP2 Series to the Formula Renault 3.5 Series, joining Strakka Racing.
- Gustav Malja, who raced for Josef Kaufmann Racing in the Eurocup Formula Renault 2.0, graduated to the series, joining Strakka Racing.
- Roy Nissany graduated to the series from the European Formula Three Championship, competing with Tech 1 Racing.
- Egor Orudzhev, who raced for Tech 1 Racing in the Eurocup Formula Renault 2.0, joined Arden Motorsport.
- Aurélien Panis, who raced for the ART Junior Team in the Eurocup Formula Renault 2.0, joined fellow French team Tech 1 Racing.
- Facu Regalia, who raced a part-season in the GP2 Series with Hilmer Motorsport, originally signed to race for Zeta Corse, but left the team prior to the start of the season to join Comtec Racing. However, prior to the first round he switched to Auto GP with FMS Racing.
- Dean Stoneman, the GP3 Series runner-up, returned to the series with DAMS.
- Nyck de Vries, the 2014 Eurocup Formula Renault 2.0 and Formula Renault 2.0 Alps champion, made his series début with DAMS.

Leaving FR3.5

- Zoël Amberg and Oliver Webb, who contested three rounds of the championship in 2014, moved to the FIA World Endurance Championship, racing in the LMP2 category for Team SARD Morand. Amberg will also race for Lazarus in the GP2 Series.
- William Buller, who raced for Arden Motorsport in 2014, joined Kondō Racing in Japanese Super Formula.
- Pierre Gasly, the runner-up of the 2014 season, joined the GP2 Series with DAMS. Gasly also took part in the final three rounds of the 2014 GP2 season with Caterham Racing.
- Luca Ghiotto, who raced for International Draco Racing in 2014, moved to the GP3 Series with Trident Racing, the team with which he contested two rounds of the 2014 season. He will be joined at the team by Óscar Tunjo, who raced for Pons Racing in 2014.
- Norman Nato, who drove for DAMS in 2014, entered the GP2 Series with Arden International.
- Carlos Sainz, Jr. the 2014 champion, graduated to Formula One, racing for Toro Rosso alongside fellow rookie Max Verstappen.
- Sergey Sirotkin, who finished fifth for Fortec Motorsports in 2014, joined the GP2 Series with Rapax.
- Marco Sørensen, who raced for Tech 1 Racing in 2014, entered the GP2 Series with Carlin, and the FIA World Endurance Championship with Aston Martin Racing.
- Will Stevens, who finished sixth for Strakka Racing in 2014, graduated to Formula One, racing for the Manor F1 Team. Stevens made his Formula One debut with Caterham in the 2014 Abu Dhabi Grand Prix.
- Marlon Stöckinger, who finished ninth for Lotus in 2014, joined Status Grand Prix in the GP2 Series.
- Cameron Twynham, who contested three rounds of the championship for Comtec Racing in 2014, joined the Porsche Supercup with MOMO-Megatron.

Mid-season changes

- GP3 Series driver Alex Fontana replaced Roberto Merhi at Pons Racing for the Monaco round due to Merhi's Formula One commitments with the Manor F1 Team on the same weekend. Former Euroseries 3000 champion Will Bratt deputised for Merhi at the Silverstone round due to his participation in the Italian Grand Prix. Bratt was replaced by GP2 Series driver René Binder at the Nürburgring round, after Merhi disbanded his contract with Pons. At the Le Mans round, Binder was replaced by Nikita Zlobin.
- After missing the first four rounds of the season, Comtec Racing returned to the championship at the Red Bull Ring with a single car for Eurocup Formula Renault 2.0 leader Louis Delétraz.
- Marlon Stöckinger replaced Meindert van Buuren at Lotus for the Red Bull Ring round after the team cancelled their contract with him. Van Buuren in turn replaced Philo Paz Armand at Pons Racing, who missed the event due to visa issues.
- GP2 Series driver Nick Yelloly replaced Stöckinger at the Silverstone round due to his GP2 Series commitments with Status Grand Prix at Monza.
- Euroformula Open driver Yu Kanamaru replaced Philo Paz Armand at Pons Racing for the Nürburgring round due to continued visa issues for Armand.
- Pietro Fantin will be replaced at Le Mans by series' returnee André Negrão, who had three consecutive seasons with Draco Racing in 2011–2013.

=== Team changes ===
- After five seasons in FR3.5, ISR Racing withdrew from the championship to focus on Sports car racing.
- British team Carlin returned to the championship after withdrawing from the 2014 season.
- Zeta Corse withdrew from the championship before the opening round after failing to secure fully funded drivers for the season.

== Race calendar and results ==
The calendar for the 2015 season was announced on 20 October 2014, on the final day of the 2014 season. Seven rounds formed meetings of the 2015 World Series by Renault season, with additional rounds to be held at the Red Bull Ring and at the Monaco Grand Prix. The championship returns to the Red Bull Ring, Silverstone and Le Mans. Monza, Moscow Raceway and Paul Ricard, which all held races in 2014, have been removed from the schedule.

On 11 February 2015, it was announced that the Silverstone round would be moved back a week due to the circuit reacquiring the rights to host the British round of the 2015 MotoGP season.

Round		Circuit	Date	Pole position	Fastest lap	Winning driver	Winning team	Rookie winner
1	R1	(Spain) Ciudad del Motor de Aragón, Alcañiz	25 April	(France) Matthieu Vaxivière	(Netherlands) Meindert van Buuren	(United Kingdom) Oliver Rowland	(United Kingdom) Fortec Motorsports	(United Kingdom) Dean Stoneman
1	R2	(Spain) Ciudad del Motor de Aragón, Alcañiz	26 April	(Netherlands) Nyck de Vries	(Mexico) Alfonso Celis Jr.	(France) Matthieu Vaxivière	(Czech Republic) Lotus	(Netherlands) Nyck de Vries
2		Circuit de Monaco, Monte Carlo	24 May	(Malaysia) Jazeman Jaafar	(United Kingdom) Oliver Rowland	(Malaysia) Jazeman Jaafar	(United Kingdom) Fortec Motorsports	(United Kingdom) Dean Stoneman
3	R1	(Belgium) Circuit de Spa-Francorchamps, Spa	30 May	(France) Matthieu Vaxivière	(Malaysia) Jazeman Jaafar	(France) Matthieu Vaxivière	(Czech Republic) Lotus	(United Kingdom) Dean Stoneman
3	R2	(Belgium) Circuit de Spa-Francorchamps, Spa	31 May	(United Kingdom) Oliver Rowland	(Canada) Nicholas Latifi	(United Kingdom) Oliver Rowland	(United Kingdom) Fortec Motorsports	(Netherlands) Nyck de Vries
4	R1	(Hungary) Hungaroring, Mogyoród	13 June	(United Kingdom) Oliver Rowland	(France) Matthieu Vaxivière	(Russia) Egor Orudzhev	(United Kingdom) Arden Motorsport	(Russia) Egor Orudzhev
4	R2	(Hungary) Hungaroring, Mogyoród	14 June	(France) Matthieu Vaxivière	(France) Matthieu Vaxivière	(United Kingdom) Oliver Rowland	(United Kingdom) Fortec Motorsports	(Sweden) Gustav Malja
5	R1	(Austria) Red Bull Ring, Spielberg	12 July	(United Kingdom) Oliver Rowland	(United Kingdom) Oliver Rowland	(United Kingdom) Oliver Rowland	(United Kingdom) Fortec Motorsports	(United Kingdom) Dean Stoneman
5	R2	(Austria) Red Bull Ring, Spielberg	12 July	(France) Matthieu Vaxivière	(United Kingdom) Oliver Rowland	(France) Matthieu Vaxivière	(Czech Republic) Lotus	(Israel) Roy Nissany
6	R1	(United Kingdom) Silverstone Circuit	5 September	(Cyprus) Tio Ellinas	(Brazil) Pietro Fantin	(Cyprus) Tio Ellinas	(United Kingdom) Strakka Racing	(Netherlands) Nyck de Vries
6	R2	(United Kingdom) Silverstone Circuit	6 September	(France) Matthieu Vaxivière	(France) Matthieu Vaxivière	(United Kingdom) Oliver Rowland	(United Kingdom) Fortec Motorsports	(United Kingdom) Dean Stoneman
7	R1	(Germany) Nürburgring, Nürburg	12 September	(United Kingdom) Oliver Rowland	(United Kingdom) Oliver Rowland	(United Kingdom) Oliver Rowland	(United Kingdom) Fortec Motorsports	(Netherlands) Nyck de Vries
7	R2	(Germany) Nürburgring, Nürburg	13 September	(United Kingdom) Oliver Rowland	(France) Tom Dillmann	(Cyprus) Tio Ellinas	(United Kingdom) Strakka Racing	(Sweden) Gustav Malja
8	R1	(France) Le Mans Bugatti, Le Mans	26 September	(United Kingdom) Oliver Rowland	(France) Matthieu Vaxivière	(United Kingdom) Oliver Rowland	(United Kingdom) Fortec Motorsports	(Russia) Egor Orudzhev
8	R2	(France) Le Mans Bugatti, Le Mans	27 September	(Cyprus) Tio Ellinas	(France) Matthieu Vaxivière	(Russia) Egor Orudzhev	(United Kingdom) Arden Motorsport	(Russia) Egor Orudzhev
9	R1	(Spain) Circuito de Jerez, Jerez de la Frontera	17 October	(France) Tom Dillmann	(Mexico) Alfonso Celis Jr.	(United Kingdom) Oliver Rowland	(United Kingdom) Fortec Motorsports	(Russia) Egor Orudzhev
9	R2	(Spain) Circuito de Jerez, Jerez de la Frontera	18 October	(United Kingdom) Oliver Rowland	(Netherlands) Nyck de Vries	(Netherlands) Nyck de Vries	(France) DAMS	(Netherlands) Nyck de Vries

== Championship standings ==
Points system

Points were awarded to the top 10 classified finishers.

Position	**1st**	**2nd**	**3rd**	**4th**	**5th**	**6th**	**7th**	**8th**	**9th**	**10th**
Points	25	18	15	12	10	8	6	4	2	1

=== Drivers' Championship ===
Pos	Driver	ARA (Spain)		MON (Monaco)	SPA (Belgium)		HUN (Hungary)		RBR (Austria)		SIL (United Kingdom)		NÜR (Germany)		LMS (France)		JER (Spain)		Points
1	(United Kingdom) Oliver Rowland	1	3	6	5	**1**	**3**	1	**1**	2	2	1	**1**	**10**	**1**	8	1	**2**	307
2	(France) Matthieu Vaxivière	**4**	1	Ret	**1**	3	4	**2**	6	**1**	3	**2**	4	11	10	2	3	3	234
3	(Netherlands) Nyck de Vries	7	**2**	11	9	2	11	9	3	5	4	Ret	2	3	7	10	4	1	160
4	(Cyprus) Tio Ellinas	Ret	4	Ret	7	5	17	6	9	13	**1**	11	6	1	9	**3**	5	4	135
5	(Russia) Egor Orudzhev	Ret	18	4	10	9	1	11	11	Ret	7	6	9	5	2	1	2	7	133
6	(United Kingdom) Dean Stoneman	3	12	2	3	4	6	12	2	Ret	Ret	4	Ret	6	4	4	13	Ret	130
7	(France) Tom Dillmann	9	5	3	6	16	5	5	5	8	5	Ret	5	14	3	5	**Ret**	6	122
8	(Malaysia) Jazeman Jaafar	2	7	**1**	2	6	18	4	10	9	10	Ret	3	17	13	14	6	8	118
9	(Sweden) Gustav Malja	10	20	Ret	8	14	10	3	7	7	6	8	8	2	11	9	11	5	79
10	(Brazil) Pietro Fantin	6	11	5	Ret	8	Ret	8	13	4	11	3	7	9					61
11	(Canada) Nicholas Latifi	8	14	Ret	4	13	Ret	17	4	Ret	8	5	Ret	Ret	Ret	7	7	10	55
12	(France) Aurélien Panis	12	13	7	Ret	7	7	13	8	Ret	Ret	9	14	Ret	5	6	Ret	13	42
13	(Israel) Roy Nissany	14	16	12	14	Ret	8	14	Ret	3	9	14	Ret	18	8	12	9	Ret	27
14	(Spain) Roberto Merhi	Ret	9		Ret	Ret	2	7	DSQ	EX									26
15	(Netherlands) Meindert van Buuren	5	6	Ret	11	10	16	10	Ret	Ret									20
16	(Mexico) Alfonso Celis Jr.	Ret	8	Ret	13	11	14	16	Ret	12	13†	12	10	4	Ret	16	15	Ret	17
17	(Philippines) Marlon Stöckinger								Ret	6			11	7	15	11	17	14	14
18	(Japan) Yu Kanamaru												12	13	6	Ret	10	11	9
19	(Indonesia) Sean Gelael	Ret	15	8	15	12	15	Ret	Ret	Ret	Ret	10	15	16	16	17	16	9	7
20	(United Kingdom) Nick Yelloly										14	7							6
21	(Brazil) André Negrão														12	Ret	8	12	4
22	(Austria) René Binder												13	8					4
23	(Netherlands) Beitske Visser	DNS	19	13†	DNS	Ret	9	15	12	10	Ret	13	16	15	14	13	12	Ret	3
24	(Switzerland) Alex Fontana			9															2
25	(Brazil) Bruno Bonifacio	11	10	Ret	12	Ret	12	18	14	11	Ret	Ret	Ret	12					1
26	(Indonesia) Philo Paz Armand	13	17	10	16	15	13	Ret			Ret	16							1
27	(United Kingdom) Will Bratt										12	15							0
28	(Russia) Nikita Zlobin														17	15	14	Ret	0
29	(Switzerland) Louis Delétraz								15	Ret									0
	(Thailand) Alexander Albon						PO	PO											0
Pos	Driver	ARA (Spain)		MON (Monaco)	SPA (Belgium)		HUN (Hungary)		RBR (Austria)		SIL (United Kingdom)		NÜR (Germany)		LMS (France)		JER (Spain)		Points

Colour	Result
Gold	Winner
Silver	Second place
Bronze	Third place
Green	Points classification
Blue	Non-points classification
Blue	Non-classified finish (NC)
Purple	Retired, not classified (Ret)
Red	Did not qualify (DNQ)
Red	Did not pre-qualify (DNPQ)
Black	Disqualified (DSQ)
White	Did not start (DNS)
White	Withdrew (WD)
White	Race cancelled (C)
Blank	Did not practice (DNP)
Blank	Did not arrive (DNA)
Blank	Excluded (EX)

**Bold** – Pole

Italics – Fastest Lap

† – Retired, but classified

Rookie

=== Teams' Championship ===
Pos	Team	Car No.	ARA (Spain)		MON (Monaco)	SPA (Belgium)		HUN (Hungary)		RBR (Austria)		SIL (United Kingdom)		NÜR (Germany)		LMS (France)		JER (Spain)		Points
1	(United Kingdom) Fortec Motorsports	3	2	7	**1**	2	6	18	4	10	9	10	Ret	3	17	13	14	6	8	425
1	(United Kingdom) Fortec Motorsports	4	1	3	6	5	**1**	**3**	1	**1**	2	2	1	**1**	**10**	**1**	8	1	2	425
2	(Czech Republic) Lotus	9	**4**	1	Ret	**1**	3	4	**2**	6	**1**	3	**2**	4	11	6	2	3	3	274
2	(Czech Republic) Lotus	10	5	6	Ret	11	10	16	10	Ret	6	14	7	11	7	15	11	17	14	274
3	(France) DAMS	1	7	**2**	11	9	2	11	9	3	5	4	Ret	2	3	7	10	4	1	246
3	(France) DAMS	2	3	12	2	3	4	6	12	2	Ret	Ret	4	Ret	6	4	4	13	Ret	246
4	(United Kingdom) Strakka Racing	11	Ret	4	Ret	7	5	17	6	9	13	**1**	11	6	1	9	3	5	4	214
4	(United Kingdom) Strakka Racing	12	10	20	Ret	8	14	10	3	7	7	6	8	8	2	11	9	11	5	214
5	(United Kingdom) Arden Motorsport	5	8	14	Ret	4	13	Ret	17	4	Ret	8	5	Ret	Ret	Ret	7	7	10	188
5	(United Kingdom) Arden Motorsport	6	Ret	18	4	10	9	1	11	11	Ret	7	6	9	5	2	1	2	7	188
6	(United Kingdom) Jagonya Ayam with Carlin	25	Ret	15	8	15	12	15	Ret	Ret	Ret	Ret	10	15	16	16	17	16	9	129
6	(United Kingdom) Jagonya Ayam with Carlin	26	9	5	3	6	16	5	5	5	8	5	Ret	5	14	3	5	**Ret**	6	129
7	(France) Tech 1 Racing	17	14	16	12	14	Ret	8	14	Ret	3	9	14	Ret	18	8	12	9	Ret	69
7	(France) Tech 1 Racing	18	12	13	7	Ret	7	7	13	8	Ret	Ret	9	14	Ret	5	6	Ret	13	69
8	(Italy) International Draco Racing	19	6	11	5	Ret	8	Ret	8	13	4	11	3	7	9	12	Ret			66
8	(Italy) International Draco Racing	20	11	10	Ret	12	Ret	12	18	14	11	Ret	Ret	Ret	12			8	12	66
9	(Spain) Pons Racing	39	13	17	10	16	15	13	Ret	Ret	Ret	Ret	16	12	13	6	Ret	10	11	40
9	(Spain) Pons Racing	40	Ret	9	9	Ret	Ret	2	7	DSQ	EX	12	15	13	8	17	15	14	Ret	40
10	(Spain) AVF	15	Ret	8	Ret	13	11	14	16	Ret	12	13†	12	10	4	Ret	16	15	Ret	20
10	(Spain) AVF	16	DNS	19	13†	DNS	Ret	9	15	12	10	Ret	13	16	15	14	13	12	Ret	20
11	(United Kingdom) Comtec Racing	21								15	Ret									0
Pos	Team	Car No.	ARA (Spain)		MON (Monaco)	SPA (Belgium)		HUN (Hungary)		RBR (Austria)		SIL (United Kingdom)		NÜR (Germany)		LMS (France)		JER (Spain)		Points

Colour	Result
Gold	Winner
Silver	Second place
Bronze	Third place
Green	Points classification
Blue	Non-points classification
Blue	Non-classified finish (NC)
Purple	Retired, not classified (Ret)
Red	Did not qualify (DNQ)
Red	Did not pre-qualify (DNPQ)
Black	Disqualified (DSQ)
White	Did not start (DNS)
White	Withdrew (WD)
White	Race cancelled (C)
Blank	Did not practice (DNP)
Blank	Did not arrive (DNA)
Blank	Excluded (EX)

**Bold** – Pole
Italics – Fastest Lap

† – Retired, but classified
