= Nieuw-Helvoet =

- Interactive map of Nieuw-Helvoet
- Coordinates: 51°50′17″N 4°7′47″E
- Country: Netherlands
- Province: South Holland
- Municipality: Voorne aan Zee

Population (2004)
  - Total: 6,610

Nieuw-Helvoet is a former village in the Dutch province of South Holland. It is now a neighbourhood in the north of the town of Hellevoetsluis.

Nieuw-Helvoet was a separate municipality until 1960, when it became part of Hellevoetsluis. In 1855, Oude en Nieuwe Struiten had merged into Nieuw-Helvoet.
