= Oostvoorne =

- Village
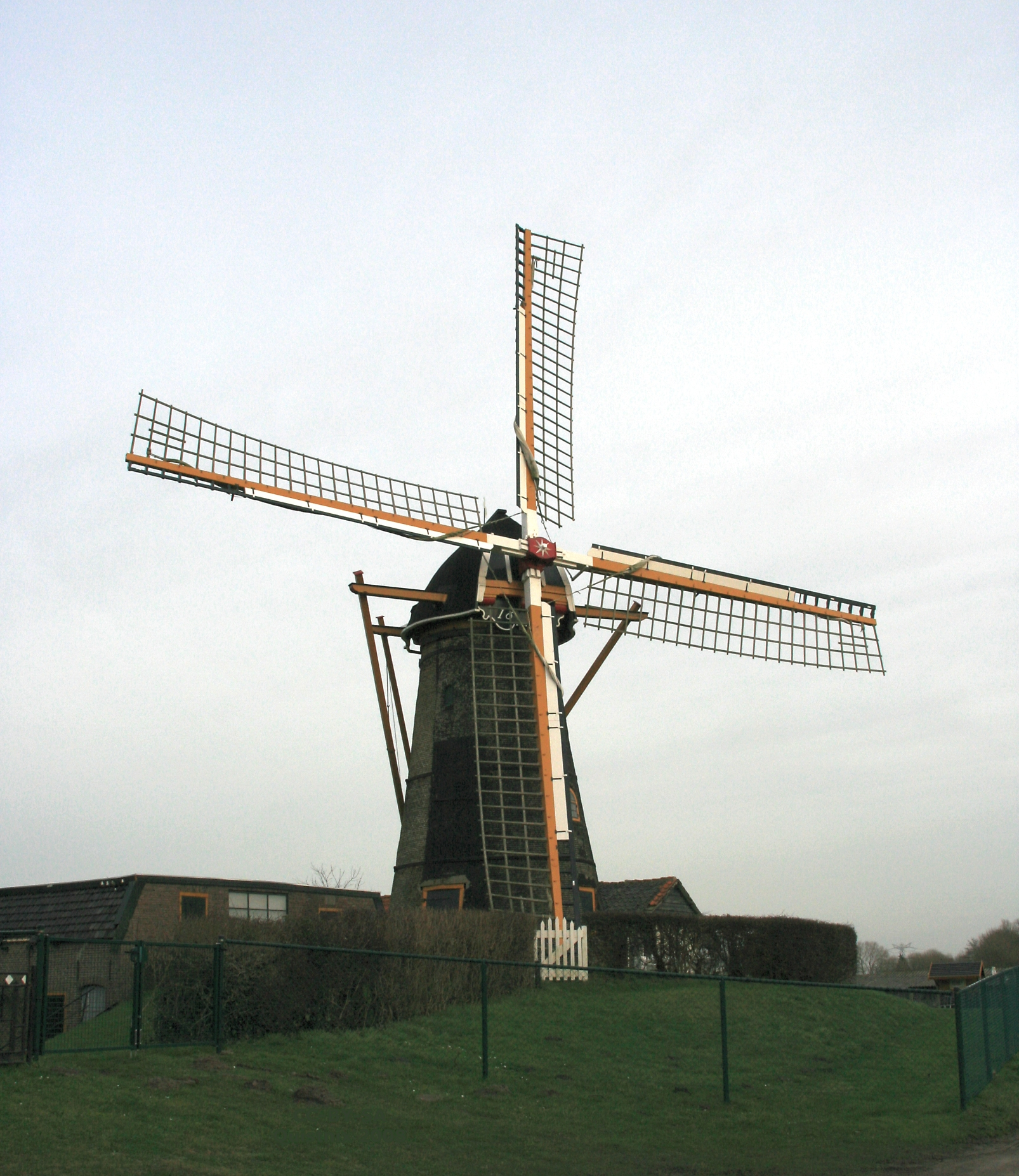
- Oostvoornse molen

- Flag Coat of arms

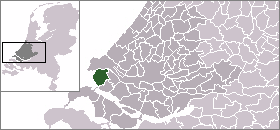

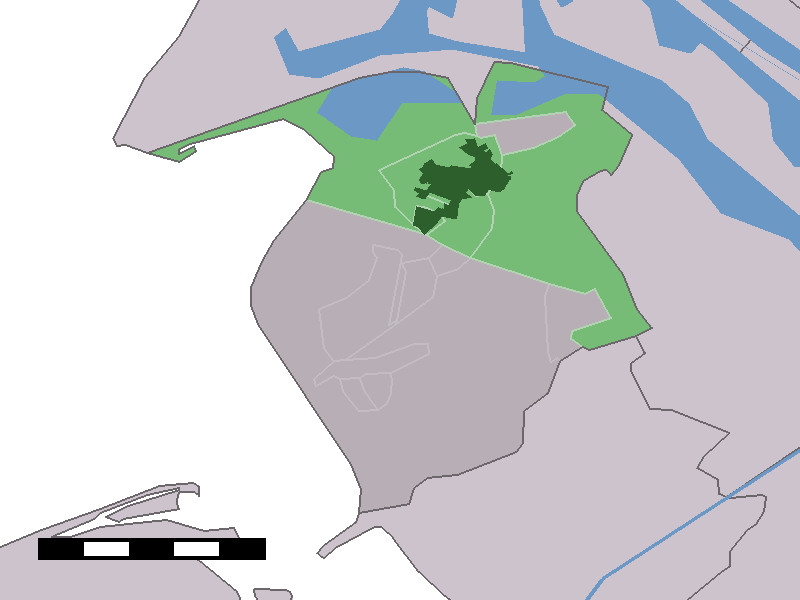
- The town centre (dark green) and the statistical district (light green) of Oostvoorne in the former municipality of Westvoorne.
- Coordinates: 51°54′43″N 4°6′3″E
- Country: Netherlands
- Province: South Holland
- Municipality: Voorne aan Zee

Population (1 January 2005)
  - Total: 7,680
- Time zone: UTC+1 (CET)
  - Summer (DST): UTC+2 (CEST)
- Postal code: 3233

Oostvoorne is a village in the western Netherlands, in the municipality of Voorne aan Zee.

In 2001, the town of Oostvoorne had 5,403 inhabitants, the built-up area of the town was 1.9 km^{2} (1 sq mi), and contained 2,274 residences. The statistical area "Oostvoorne", which also can include the peripheral parts of the village, as well as the surrounding countryside, has a population of around 7,270.

Oostvoorne was a separate municipality until 1980, when it became part of Westvoorne.

Oostvoorne was since before World War II the only location in the Netherlands where automobiles were permitted on the beach. In 1992 it was proposed to close the beach to cars resulting in consultations and negotiations lasting many years. The provincial government finally decided to close it permanently on October 15, 2004.

In the center of Oostvoorne are the ruins of the Burcht of Voorne, one of the few Dutch castles still visibly situated on top of a motte. It was built shortly after 1200 by the Lords of Voorne. It also served as a residence for Jacqueline, Countess of Hainaut (Jacoba van Beieren).

== Sport ==
=== Cycling ===
Since 1985 Oostvoorne has been organizing the Profronde van Oostvoorne, an elite men's and women's professional road bicycle racing criterium.

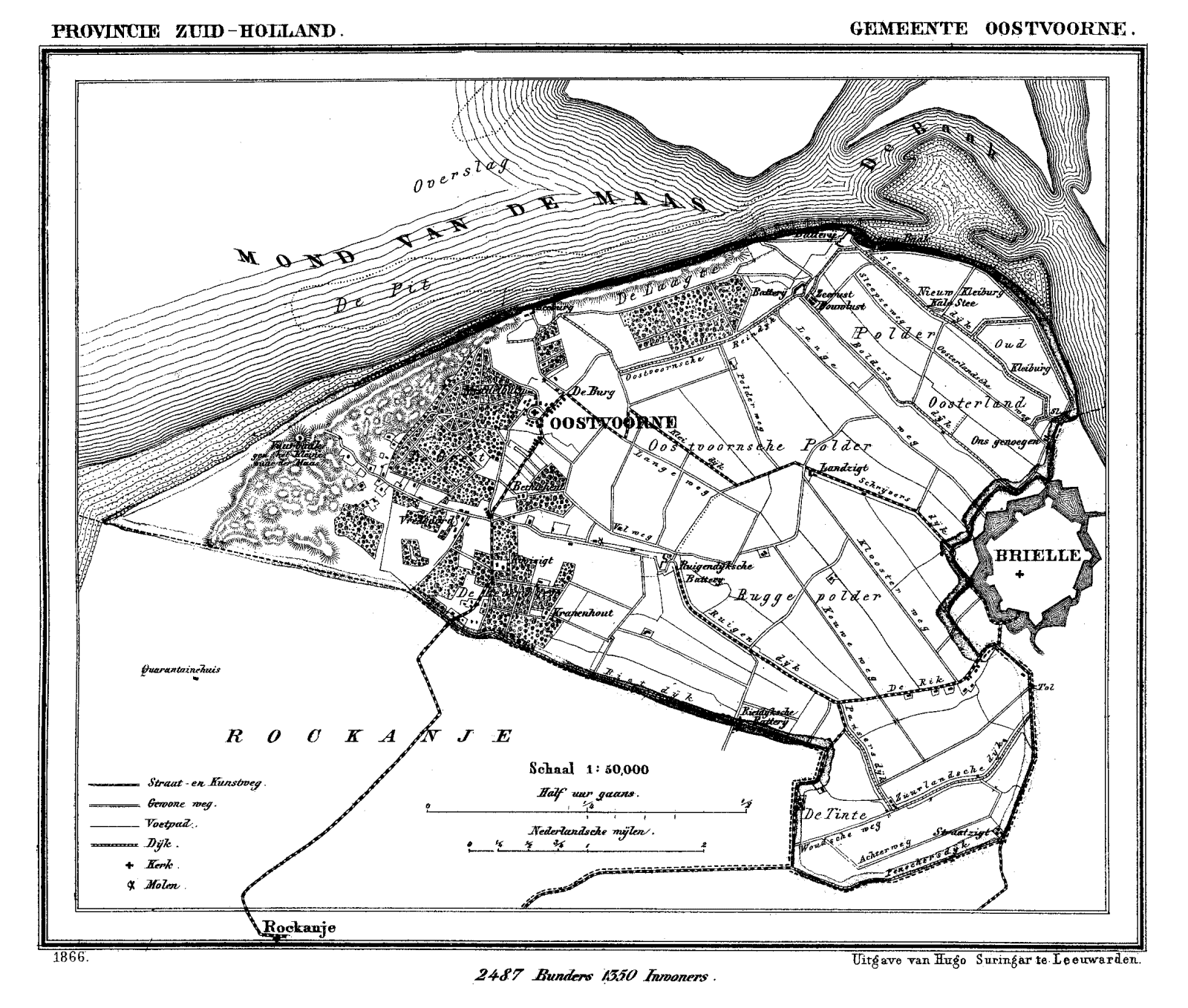
Oostvoorne in 1866.

== Notable people born in Oostvoorne ==
- Youri Baas, football player
- Belinda Meuldijk, actress, writer, and activist
