= Rockanje =

- Village
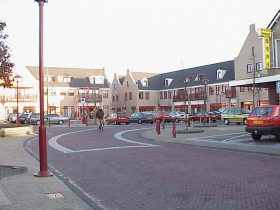
- Village centre of Rockanje

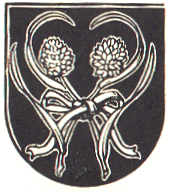
- Flag Coat of arms

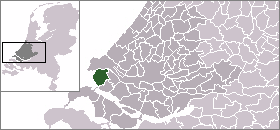

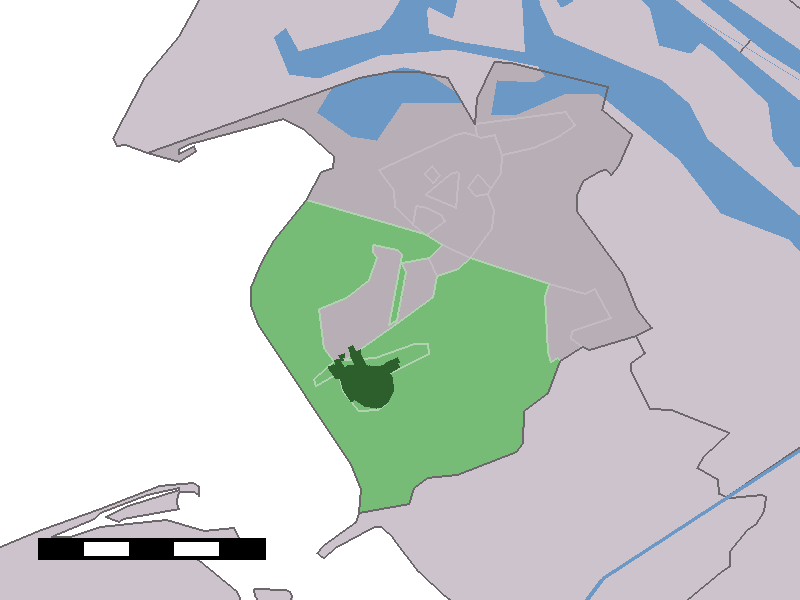
- The village centre (dark green) and the statistical district (light green) of Rockanje in the former municipality of Westvoorne.
- Coordinates: 51°52′14″N 4°4′8″E
- Country: Netherlands
- Province: South Holland
- Municipality: Voorne aan Zee

Area
  - Total: 30.03 km^{2} (11.59 sq mi)
  - Land: 29.75 km^{2} (11.49 sq mi)
  - Water: 0.26 km^{2} (0.10 sq mi)

Population (1 January 2005)
  - Total: 6,560
  - Density: 221/km^{2} (571/sq mi)
- Time zone: UTC+1 (CET)
  - Summer (DST): UTC+2 (CEST)
- Postal code: 3235

Rockanje is a village in the Dutch province of South Holland. It is a part of the municipality of Voorne aan Zee, and lies about 7 km northwest of Hellevoetsluis.

In 2001, the village of Rockanje had 4805 inhabitants. The built-up area of the village was 1.2 km^{2}, and contained 2004 residences. The statistical area "Rockanje", which also can include the peripheral parts of the village, as well as the surrounding countryside, has a population of around 5710.

Rockanje was a separate municipality until 1980, when it became part of Westvoorne.

== Notable people ==
- Annelous Lammerts (born 1993), windsurfer.
- Meindert van Buuren (born 1995), racing driver

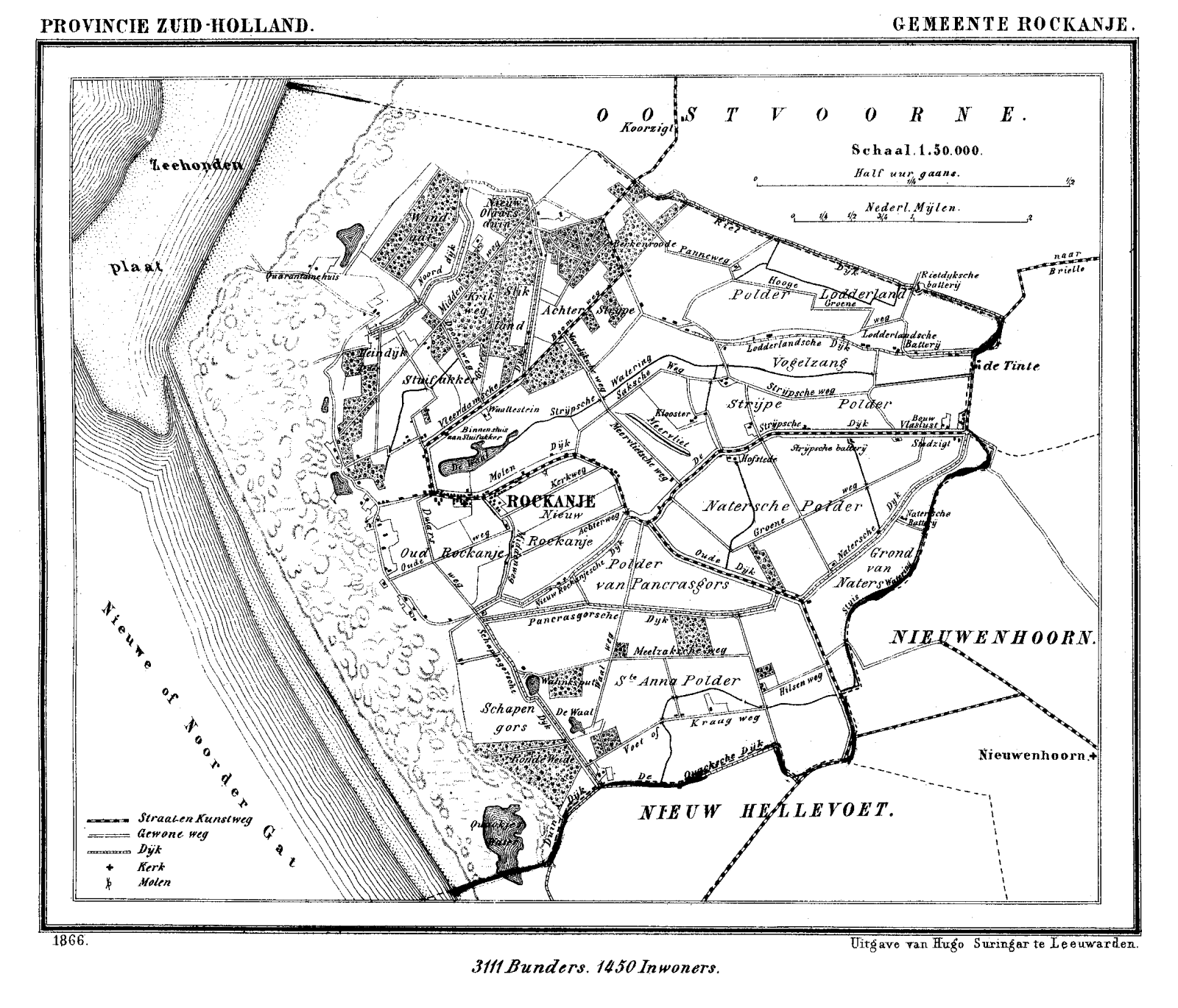
Rockanje in 1866.
