= Oude en Nieuwe Struiten =

Coordinates: 51.824851°N 4.14691°E

Oude en Nieuwe Struiten is a former municipality in the Dutch province of South Holland. It consisted of a small polder east of Hellevoetsluis, and is now covered by the suburbs Wittenshoeck and De Struyten of that city.

The municipality existed between 1817 and 1855, when it merged with Nieuw-Helvoet.
