= Hoogendijk =

Hoogendijk is a Dutch toponymic surname meaning "high dike". Among variant forms are Hogendijk and Hoogerdijk. Abroad the "ij" digraph is usually replaced with a "y." Notable people with the surname include:

- Anouk Hoogendijk (born 1985), Dutch footballer
- Cornelis Hoogendijk (1866–1911), Dutch art collector
- Ferry Hoogendijk (1933–2014), Dutch journalist and politician
- Jack Hoogendyk (born 1955), American (Michigan) Republican politician
- Jan Hogendijk (born 1955), Dutch mathematician and historian of science
- Jan Hoogendyk (born 1979), South African musician and songwriter known as "Elvis Blue"
- Leen Hoogendijk (1890–1969), Dutch water polo player
- Maria Ida Adriana Hoogendijk (1874–1942), Dutch painter
- Micky Hoogendijk (born 1970), Dutch actress, presenter, model and photographer
- Oeke Hoogendijk (born 1961), Dutch documentary film maker
- Steven Hoogendijk (1698–1788), Dutch watchmaker and physicist
