= Volkert Simon Maarten van der Willigen =

Dutch mathematician and physicist (1822–1878)

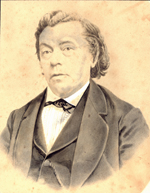
- Born: May 9, 1822 , Rockanje, Netherlands
- Died: February 19, 1878 (aged 55); Haarlem, Netherlands
- Education: Hoogeschool Leiden
- Scientific career
- Fields: Metrology
- Thesis: De aberratione lucis (1847)

Volkert Simon Maarten van der Willigen (9 May 1822 – 19 February 1878), sometimes referred to as Volcardus Simon Martinus van der Willigen, was a Dutch mathematician, physicist and professor.

== Life ==
Volkert was born in Rockanje, son of the minister Johannes van der Willigen (1777–1857) and his wife Gerarde Maria Elsabé Bodde (1795–1865). He was the nephew of the Dutch patriot and writer Adriaan van der Willigen.

He studied at the Hoogeschool Leiden (the current Leiden University) and promoted in 1847 with his dissertation De aberratione lucis (on the aberrations of the light). After graduating he became teacher at the Latin school in Amsterdam. In 1848 he was appointed to professor in the mathematics and physics and philosophy at Athenaeum Illustre in Deventer. He accepted his appointment with the lauratio Over natuur- en sterrekundig onderzoek (On physical and astronomical research). In 1857 he became a member of the Koninklijke Nederlandse Akademie van Wetenschappen (Netherlands Royal Academy of Sciences).

When the Athenaeum Illustre of Deventer was abolished in 1864, he was appointed conservator of the Physical Cabinet of the Teylers Museum in Haarlem where Jacob Gijsbertus Samuël van Breda had resigned his post nine months earlier. Contrary to Van Breda however, Van der Willigen refused to accept the responsibility for the Paleontological-Mineralogical cabinet alongside his duties for the Physical cabinet, and that position was later filled by Tiberius Cornelis Winkler. Thus free to devote himself to the instrument collection and physics experiments, in the years that he spent at Teylers, Van der Willigen published 51 papers.

As a scientist, Van der Willigen did significant work in the research on physical units – where he tried to use the wavelength of light to set a new and trustworthy standard for a unit of distance. In those days there was insufficient data on the reliability of measurement units because errors had been made in the standards based on the circumference of the earth. The Dutch Minister of the Interior had requested the Koninklijke Nederlandse Akademie van Wetenschappen in 1851 to come up with a new standard for both length and weight. Inspired by this discussion and a publication by the Swedish scientist Anders Ångström in 1855, Van der Willigen decided to dedicate himself first to the determination of the refractive index and the wavelength of light, in order to be able to more accurately define the unit of length. In the inner garden of the Museum, he had a small observatory built in 1866/1867, where he set up several precision instruments to determine the latitude (zenith telescope) and time (clock). There he also kept an astronomical regulator, heliostat, spectroscope, diffraction gratings, microscope with micrometer, balance, thermometers and barometers. He also ordered the standards of length (glass) and weight (copper). Combining these instruments he tried to determine a standard of length by use of a seconds pendulum (initially a Foucault pendulum, later he ordered a Repsold reversible pendulum which arrived shortly after his death). Besides his work on measurements, he also purchased acoustics instruments, on which he gave a series of lectures in the museum.

Van der Willigen became active in Haarlem society and was a member of the Haarlem city council from 1864 (the year of his arrival) to the year of his death.

== Works ==
(incomplete overview)

- Iets over meteorologische waarnemingen (Something about meteorological observations)
- Slingerproeven te Deventer (Pendulum experiments in Deventer); 1852
- Verzameling kleine geschriften (Collection of small writings); 1852
- Bepaling der poolshoogte voor Deventer (Determination of the pile height for Deventer); 1852
- Proeve betreffende den galvanschen lichtboog (Experiment regarding the galvanic arc); 1854
- Nog iets over electrische ringen (Another something about electrical rings); 1863
- De coefficienten van breking van mengsels van zwavelzuur en water (The coefficients of refraction of mixtures of sulfuric acid and water); 1864
- Over de verschijnselen van gekleurde polarisatie voor eenassige kristallen convergent licht (On the phenomena of colored polarization of single axis crystals converging light); 1873
- Over de onhoudbaarheid der stelling dat de betrekking der lichtstralen wordt gewijzigd door de beweging van licht-bron en prisma (On the untenability of the proposition that the relation of light beams is changed by the movement of light source and prism); 1873
- Mémoire sur la détermination des longueurs d'onde du spectre solaire (French); 1875
- Over het electrisch spectrum (on the electric spectrum); unknown year
- Over eene optische illusie, waarbij het relief van het beschouwde voorwerp wordt omgekeerd (On an optical illusion, where the relief of the considered object is reversed); unknown year
