= Meindert van Buuren =

Dutch racing driver

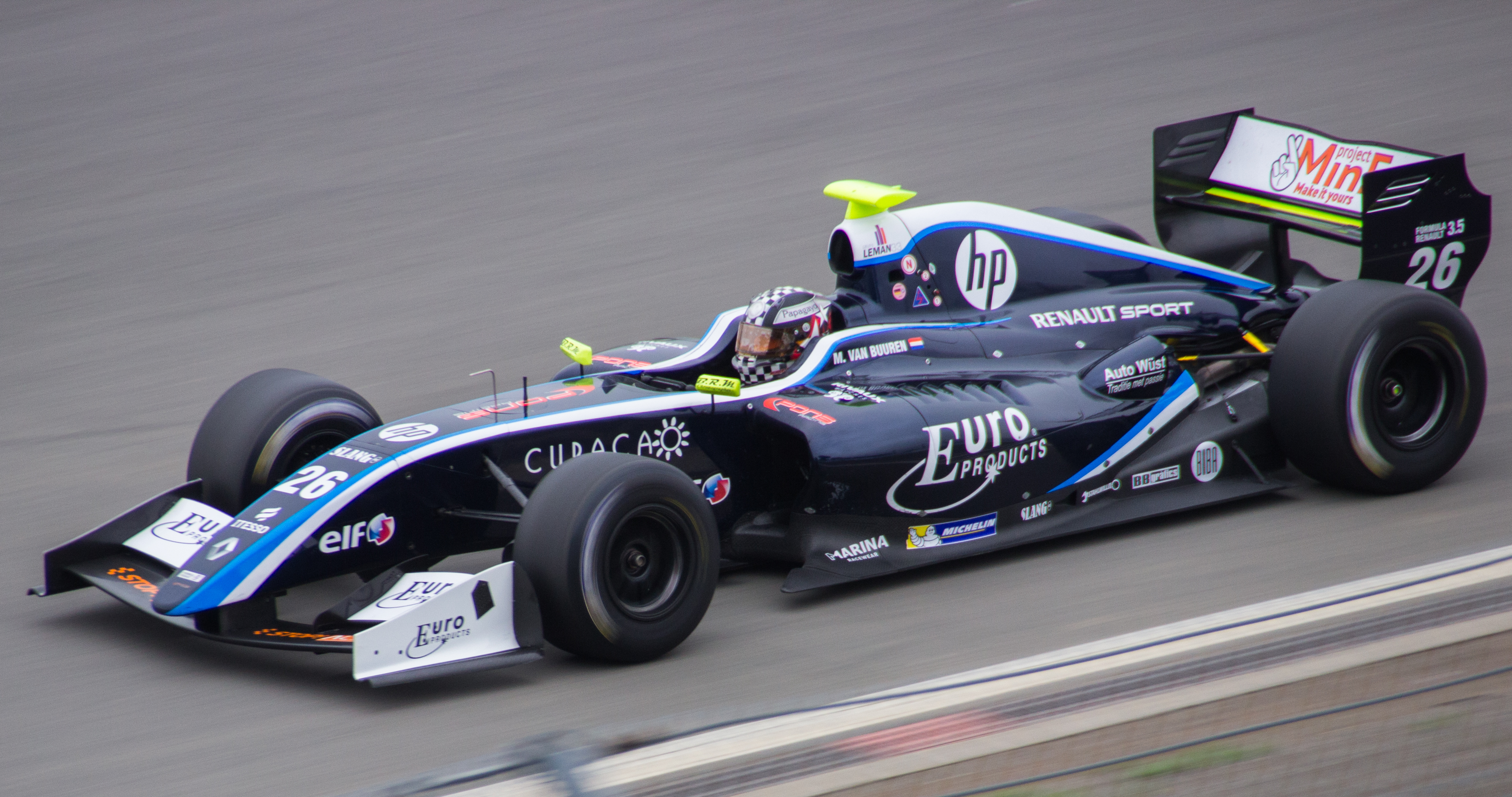
- Van Buuren racing at Nürburgring in 2014
- Nationality: (Netherlands) Dutch
- Born: 5 January 1995 (age 31) Rockanje, South Holland, Netherlands

Formula Renault 3.5 Series career
- Debut season: 2014
- Current team: Pons Racing
- Car number: 10
- Former teams: Lotus
- Starts: 26
- Wins: 0
- Poles: 0
- Fastest laps: 2
- Best finish: 15th in 2015

Previous series
- 2015 2015 2013 2011–12 2011–12: Renault Sport Trophy; GP2 Series; Auto GP; Eurocup Formula Renault 2.0; Formula Renault 2.0 NEC

Meindert van Buuren Jr. (born 5 January 1995) is a Dutch former racing driver, who currently resides in Rockanje.

== Career ==
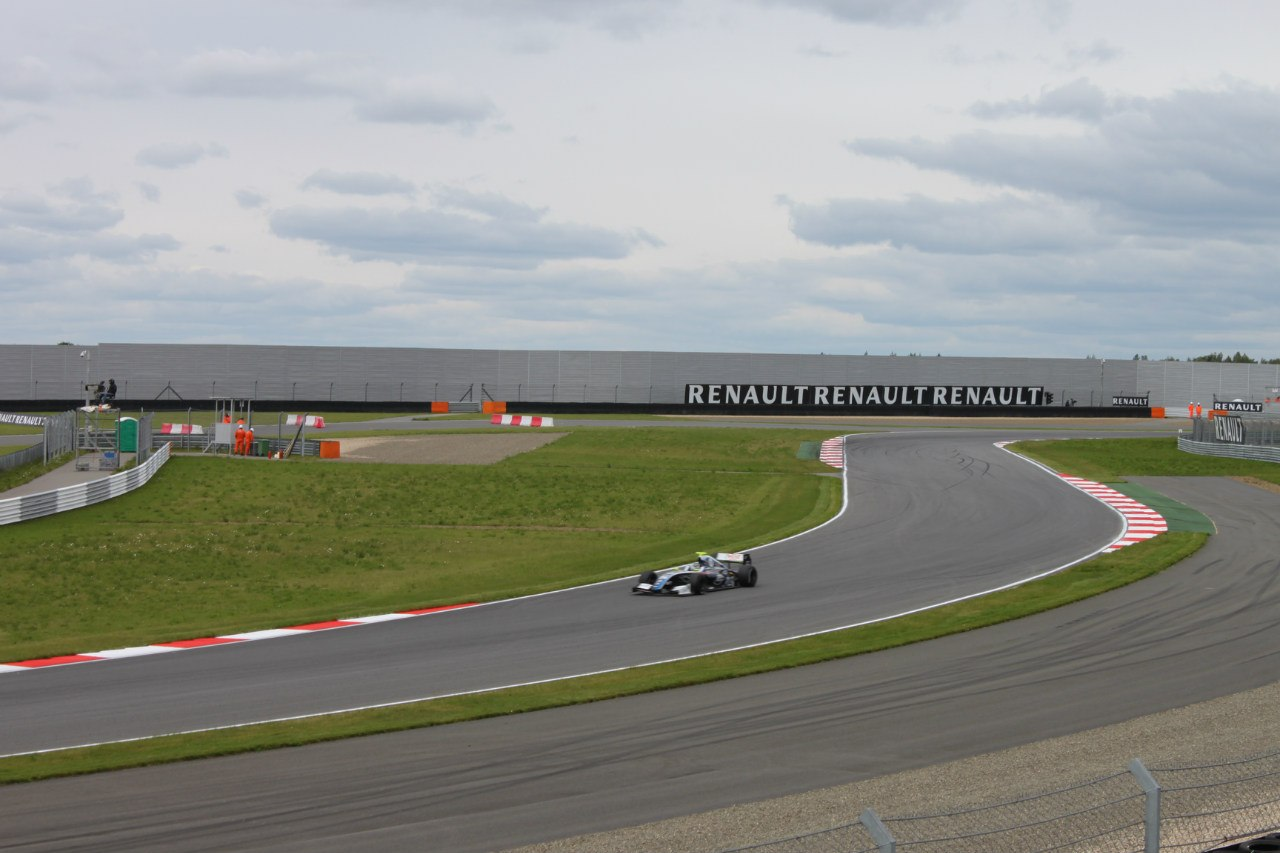
Van Buuren during Race 1 of the 2014 Formula Renault 3.5 Series season at Moscow Raceway.

=== Karting ===
Van Buuren began karting in 2004 at the age of nine and raced mostly in various Dutch championships, working his way up from the junior ranks to progress through to the Rotax Max DD2 category by 2011, when he finished in fourth position in the Rotax Max Wintercup.

=== Formula Renault 2.0 ===
2011 saw his début in the Formula Renault 2.0 Northern European Cup championship with Van Amersfoort Racing. Van Buuren finished 21st in the championship, despite missing the final round of the championship, at Monza. He also contested four rounds of the Eurocup Formula Renault 2.0, but only finished one race inside the top twenty placings.

Van Buuren remained in both series for the 2012 season, but switched to Manor MP Motorsport. He improved to eleventh position in the NEC series, while in the Eurocup, he recorded four top-twenty finishes.

=== Auto GP ===
Van Buuren continued his collaboration with Manor MP Motorsport into the Auto GP in 2013. He finished ninth in the drivers' standings with a podium at Donington Park and another nine point-scoring finishes.

=== Formula Renault 3.5 Series ===
In 2014, Van Buuren would graduate to the Formula Renault 3.5 Series, joining Pons Racing.

== Racing record ==
=== Career summary ===
Season	Series	Team	Races	Wins	Poles	F/Laps	Podiums	Points	Position
2011	Formula Renault 2.0 NEC	Van Amersfoort Racing	17	0	0	0	0	85	21st
2011	Eurocup Formula Renault 2.0	Van Amersfoort Racing	2	0	0	0	0	0	39th
2011	Eurocup Formula Renault 2.0	KTR	6	0	0	0	0	0	39th
2012	Formula Renault 2.0 NEC	Manor MP Motorsport	19	0	0	0	1	161	11th
2012	Eurocup Formula Renault 2.0	Manor MP Motorsport	12	0	0	0	0	0	32nd
2013	Auto GP	Manor MP Motorsport	15	0	0	0	1	57	9th
2014	Formula Renault 3.5 Series	Pons Racing	17	0	0	0	0	21	19th
2015	Formula Renault 3.5 Series	Lotus	7	0	0	1	0	20	15th
2015	Formula Renault 3.5 Series	Pons Racing	2	0	0	0	0	20	15th
2015	GP2 Series	MP Motorsport	1	0	0	0	0	0	NC
2015	Renault Sport Trophy - Elite	V8 Racing	2	0	0	1	0	0	NC†
2015	Renault Sport Endurance Trophy	V8 Racing	1	0	0	0	0	0	NC†
2016	Renault Sport Trophy - Pro	V8 Racing	3	0	0	0	0	12	17th
2016	Renault Sport Endurance Trophy	V8 Racing	3	0	0	0	0	0	32nd
2016	TCR BeNeLux Touring Car Championship	Bas Koeten Racing	3	0	0	0	1	52	26th
2016	TCR BeNeLux Touring Car Championship – Junior	Bas Koeten Racing	3	0	0	0	1	47	7th
2017	TCR BeNeLux Touring Car Championship	Bas Koeten Racing	3	0	0	0	0	46	26th
2017	Lamborghini Super Trofeo Asia - Pro	Team Lazarus	2	1	0	0	2	27	11th
2019	GT4 European Series - Silver	Selleslagh Racing Team	2	0	0	0	0	0	NC
2023	Supercar Challenge - Supersport 2	CP Motorsport by DRDO	2	0	0	0	2	40	11th

^{†} As van Buuren was a guest driver, he was ineligible to score points.

=== Complete Formula Renault 2.0 NEC results ===
(key) (Races in bold indicate pole position) (Races in italics indicate fastest lap)

Year	Entrant	1	2	3	4	5	6	7	8	9	10	11	12	13	14	15	16	17	18	19	20	DC	Points
2011	Van Amersfoort Racing	HOC; 1; 10	HOC; 2; 22	HOC; 3; 17	SPA; 1; 20	SPA; 2 Ret	NÜR; 1; 14	NÜR; 2; 20	ASS; 1; 10	ASS; 2; 20	ASS; 3; 10	OSC; 1; 17	OSC; 2; 12	ZAN; 1; 18	ZAN; 2; 9	MST; 1 Ret	MST; 2 Ret	MST; 3 Ret	MNZ; 1	MNZ; 2	MNZ; 3	21st	85
2012	Manor MP Motorsport	HOC; 1 DNS	HOC; 2; 9	HOC; 3 Ret	NÜR; 1; 16	NÜR; 2; 11	OSC; 1; 15	OSC; 2 Ret	OSC; 3; 9	ASS; 1; 11	ASS; 2; 6	RBR; 1; 18	RBR; 2; 7	MST; 1 Ret	MST; 2; 28	MST; 3; 16	ZAN; 1; 4	ZAN; 2; 4	ZAN; 3; 3	SPA; 1; 9	SPA; 2; 18	11th	161

=== Complete Eurocup Formula Renault 2.0 results ===
(key) (Races in bold indicate pole position; races in italics indicate fastest lap)

Year	Entrant	1	2	3	4	5	6	7	8	9	10	11	12	13	14	DC	Points
2011	Van Amersfoort Racing	ALC; 1	ALC; 2	SPA; 1; 20	SPA; 2 Ret											39th	0
2011	KTR					NÜR; 1	NÜR; 2	HUN; 1	HUN; 2	SIL; 1; 21	SIL; 2; 27	LEC; 1; 25	LEC; 2; 26	CAT; 1; 25	CAT; 2; 32	39th	0
2012	Manor MP Motorsport	ALC; 1 Ret	ALC; 2 Ret	SPA; 1; 18	SPA; 2; 15	NÜR; 1; 20	NÜR; 2 Ret	MSC; 1; 22	MSC; 2; 21	HUN; 1	HUN; 2	LEC; 1 Ret	LEC; 2; 23	CAT; 1; 11	CAT; 2 Ret	32nd	0

=== Complete Auto GP results ===
(key) (Races in bold indicate pole position) (Races in italics indicate fastest lap)

Year	Entrant	1	2	3	4	5	6	7	8	9	10	11	12	13	14	15	16	Pos	Points
2013	Manor MP Motorsport	MNZ; 1 Ret	MNZ; 2; 10	MAR; 1 Ret	MAR; 2; 6	HUN; 1; 6	HUN; 2 Ret	SIL; 1; 8	SIL; 2; 4	MUG; 1; 10	MUG; 2; 6	NÜR; 1; 12	NÜR; 2 DNS	DON; 1; 8	DON; 2; 2	BRN; 2; 12	BRN; 2; 9	9th	57

=== Complete Formula Renault 3.5 Series results ===
(key) (Races in bold indicate pole position) (Races in italics indicate fastest lap)

Year	Team	1	2	3	4	5	6	7	8	9	10	11	12	13	14	15	16	17	Pos	Points
2014	Pons Racing	MNZ; 1; 9	MNZ; 2 Ret	ALC; 1; 14	ALC; 2; 11	MON; 1; 10	SPA; 1; 12	SPA; 2; 9	MSC; 1 NC	MSC; 2; 18	NÜR; 1; 14	NÜR; 2 Ret	HUN; 1; 16	HUN; 2; 5	LEC; 1 Ret	LEC; 2; 14	JER; 1; 7	JER; 2; 15	19th	21
2015	Lotus	ALC; 1; 5	ALC; 2; 6	MON; 1 Ret	SPA; 1; 11	SPA; 2; 10	HUN; 1; 16	HUN; 2; 10											15th	20
2015	Pons Racing								RBR; 1 Ret	RBR; 2 Ret	SIL; 1	SIL; 2	NÜR; 1	NÜR; 2	BUG; 1	BUG; 2	JER; 1	JER; 2	15th	20

=== Complete GP2 Series results ===
(key) (Races in bold indicate pole position) (Races in italics indicate fastest lap)

Year	Entrant	1	2	3	4	5	6	7	8	9	10	11	12	13	14	15	16	17	18	19	20	21	22	DC	Points
2015	MP Motorsport	BHR; FEA	BHR; SPR	ESP; FEA	ESP; SPR	MON; FEA	MON; SPR	AUT; FEA	AUT; SPR	GBR; FEA	GBR; SPR	HUN; FEA	HUN; SPR	BEL; FEA	BEL; SPR	ITA; FEA; Ret	ITA; SPR; DNS	RUS; FEA	RUS; SPR	BHR; FEA	BHR; SPR	ABU; FEA	ABU; SPR	NC	0
