= 1916 Virgin Islands hurricane =

Category 3 Atlantic hurricane

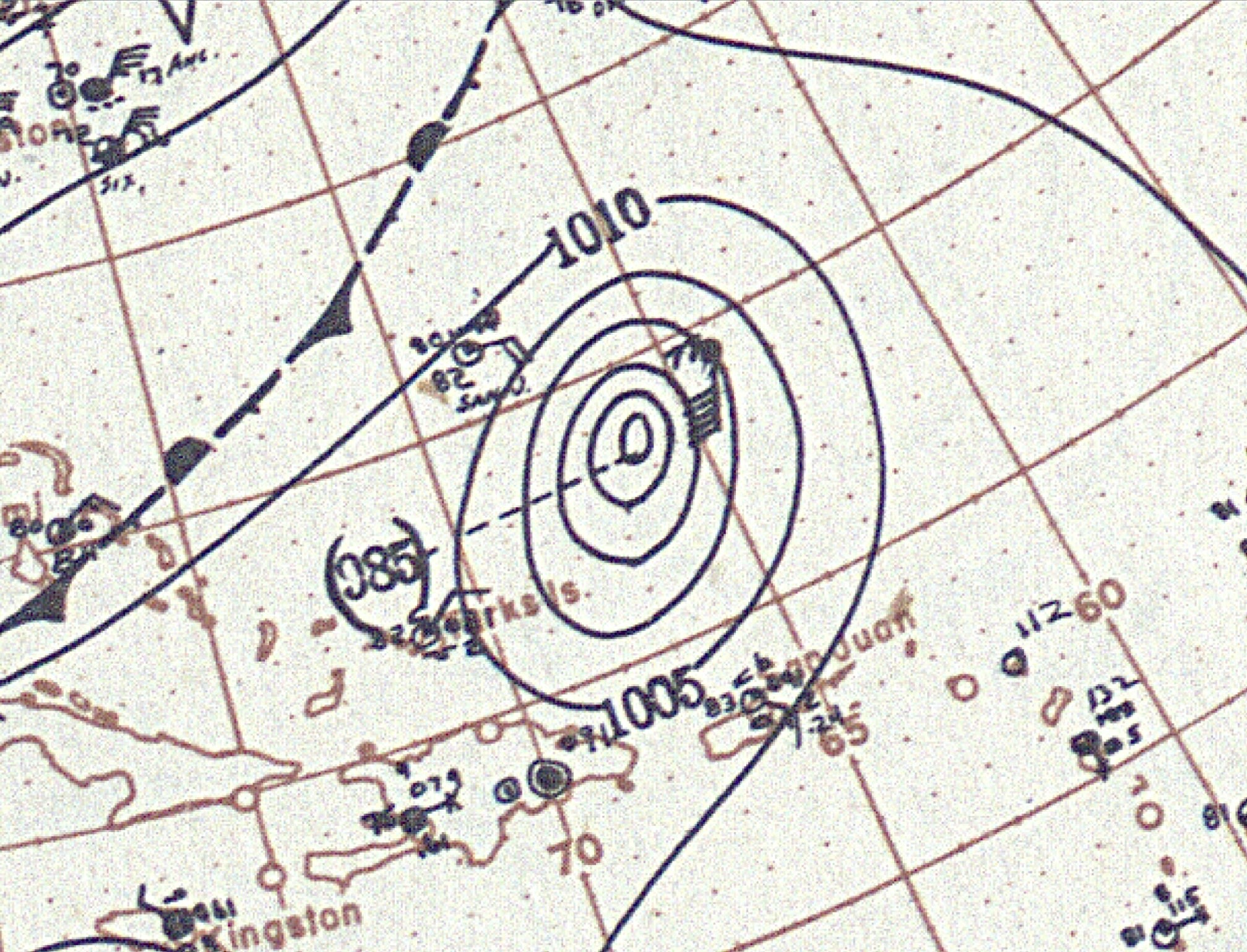
- Surface weather analysis of the hurricane moving north in the Sargasso Sea on October 11

Meteorological history
- Formed: October 6, 1916
- Dissipated: October 15, 1916

Category 3 major hurricane
- 1-minute sustained (SSHWS/NWS)
- Highest winds: 120 mph (195 km/h)
- Lowest pressure: 963 mbar (hPa); 28.44 inHg (Lowest directly measured (Note: A pressure of 963 mbar (963 hPa; 28.4 inHg) was measured at 23:00 UTC on October 9 in St. Croix. The Atlantic hurricane reanalysis project determined that this reading was likely taken at the center of the storm, and as such it is listed as the hurricane's official pressure at 18:00 UTC on October 9 in the official Atlantic hurricane database. However, no other pressures are listed for the storm at other times, including when the hurricane attained its maximum winds.))

Overall effects
- Fatalities: 41 total
- Damage: <$2 million (1916 USD)
- Areas affected: Windward Islands; Virgin Islands
- Part of the 1916 Atlantic hurricane season

The 1916 Virgin Islands hurricane was a strong tropical cyclone that inflicted extensive damage across the Virgin Islands in October 1916. It was the region's most destructive storm since at least the 1867 San Narciso hurricane; Consul General Christopher Payne and archaeologist Theodoor de Booy considered the 1916 storm as the archipelago's most damaging. Its peak intensity was equivalent to a Category 3 on the modern Saffir–Simpson scale. The storm began as a tropical depression southeast of Barbados on October 6, though little is known about the storm's origins or its developing stages; by the time its center was first located, the cyclone was already a hurricane and causing damage in the Virgin Islands. After forming, the storm moved northwest into the eastern Caribbean Sea and strengthened quickly. Rough seas were produced in the Windward Islands at Dominica and Saint Kitts as the storm passed nearby between October 7–8, damaging coastal villages.

On the evening of October 9, the hurricane traversed the Virgin Islands with an intensity equivalent to a Category 2 on the modern Saffir–Simpson scale, passing directly over Saint Croix and producing gusts as high as 160 mph (260 km/h). Of the Danish West Indies, Saint Thomas fared worst, with virtually every building sustaining damage. The island harbor suffered greatly and numerous ships were grounded or sunk. Entire towns in Saint Croix and Tortola were destroyed. There were four deaths in Saint Thomas, five in the remainder of the Danish West Indies, and thirty-two in Tortola. After battering the Lesser Antilles, the hurricane continued harmlessly out to sea on a northward and later northeastward trajectory. While well southeast of Bermuda, the storm's intensity peaked on October 12 with maximum sustained winds of 120 mph (190 km/h). Steady weakening ensued thereafter, and the storm transitioned into an extratropical cyclone on October 14 before being absorbed by another cyclone east of Newfoundland a day later. Amid the storm's aftermath, coal carriers successfully went on strike for increased wages. Crop production in 1917 was significantly curtailed by the widespread damage wrought to agriculture by the hurricane.

== Meteorological history ==
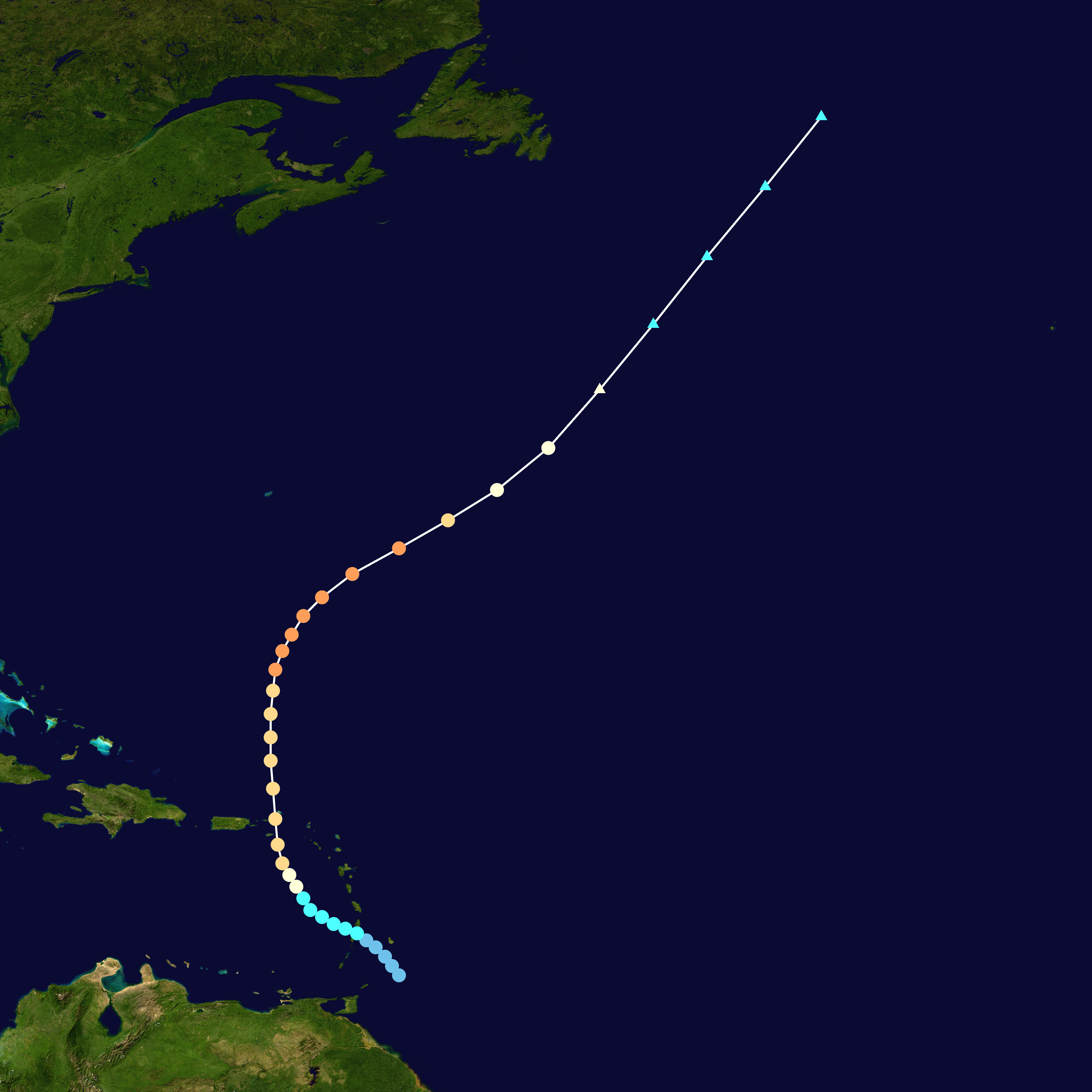
Map plotting the storm's track and intensity, according to the Saffir–Simpson scale Map key Saffir–Simpson scale Tropical depression (≤38 mph, ≤62 km/h) Tropical storm (39–73 mph, 63–118 km/h) Category 1 (74–95 mph, 119–153 km/h) Category 2 (96–110 mph, 154–177 km/h) Category 3 (111–129 mph, 178–208 km/h) Category 4 (130–156 mph, 209–251 km/h) Category 5 (≥157 mph, ≥252 km/h) Unknown Storm type Tropical cyclone Subtropical cyclone Extratropical cyclone, remnant low, tropical disturbance, or monsoon depression

The 1916 Virgin Islands hurricane was the thirteenth known tropical cyclone of the 1916 Atlantic hurricane season. Owing to a paucity of weather observations in the region, the precise location of the storm was not known contemporaneously until it was already traversing the Virgin Islands as a fully-fledged hurricane. According to a reanalysis of the hurricane in 2008, conducted by the Atlantic Oceanographic and Meteorological Laboratory, the storm began just southeast of Barbados as a tropical depression on October 6. Over the next three days, it traveled on a northwestward course into the Caribbean Sea. Winds in the southern Lesser Antilles remained low as the system passed between Saint Lucia and Saint Vincent on October 7. However, the emergence of low air pressures in Dominica prompted the United States Weather Bureau to begin monitoring the disturbance, requesting additional weather observations to better diagnose the developing tropical cyclone. The tropical storm strengthened into a hurricane on October 9.

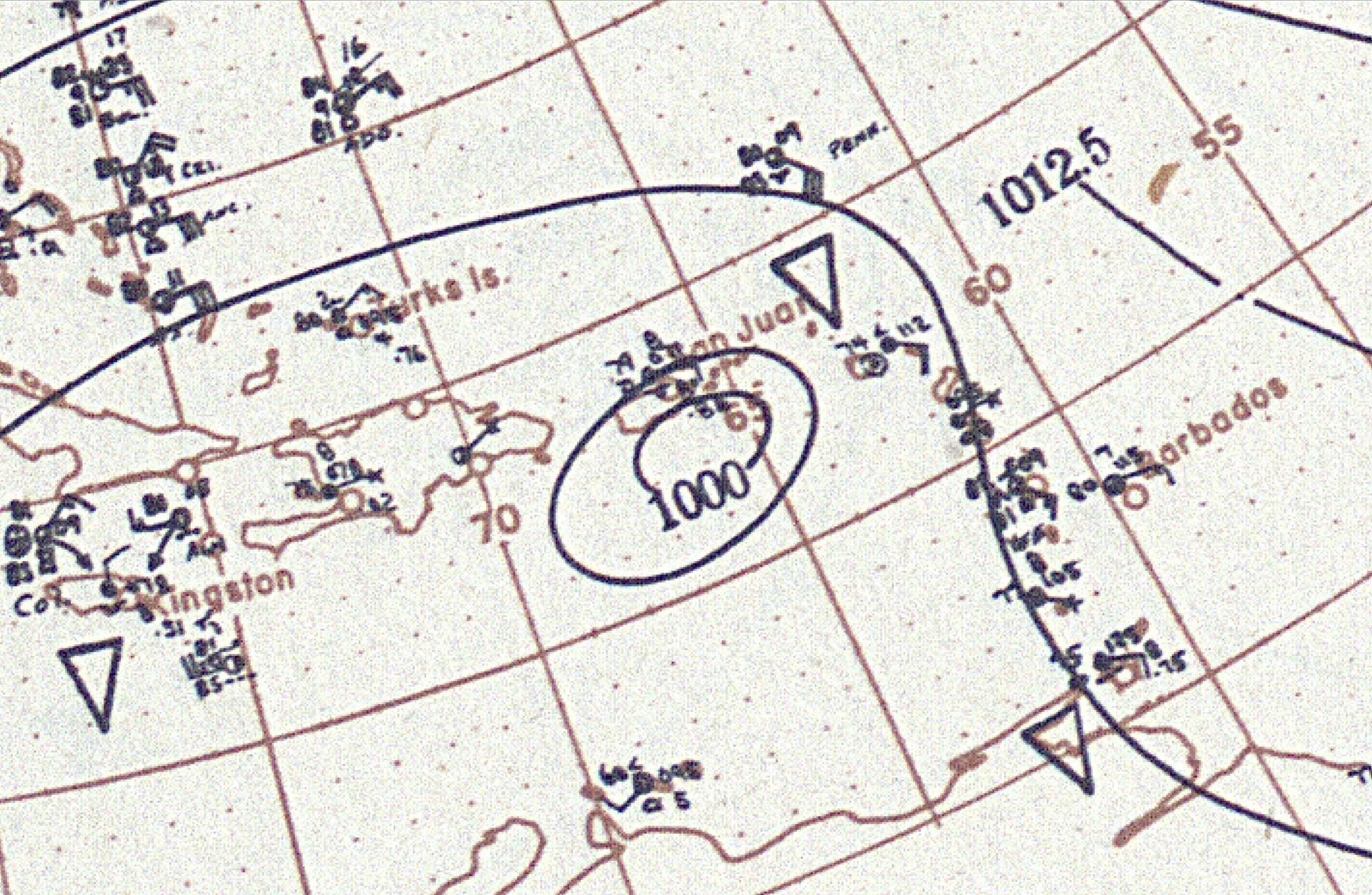
Surface weather map of the hurricane approaching the Virgin Islands on October 9

Curving towards the north, the storm intensified quickly and made landfall on the Danish West Indies at Saint Croix on the evening of October 9. According to a Weather Bureau report published in the Monthly Weather Review, "The storm was of small area and of great intensity." An air pressure of 963 mbar (hPa; 28.44 inHg) was registered on the island, lower than any other reading in the island's history; based on this reading, the Atlantic hurricane reanalysis project estimated that the hurricane possessed maximum sustained winds of at least 110 mph (180 km/h) during its passage through the Virgin Islands, equivalent to a Category 2 hurricane on the modern Saffir–Simpson scale. The project also noted that the storm may have been a major hurricane at landfall. (Note: A major hurricane is a storm that ranks as Category 3 or higher on the Saffir–Simpson hurricane scale.) Gusts may have been as high as 140–160 mph (230–260 km/h). After crossing the islands, the hurricane continued north, its winds increasing further to a peak of 120 mph (190 km/h) southeast of Bermuda on October 12. A ship caught in the hurricane that day reported winds of 105 mph (169 km/h). The storm curved towards the northeast and weakened following this peak intensity, transitioning into an extratropical cyclone on October 14; the system continued its trajectory into the northern Atlantic before it was absorbed by another extratropical cyclone east of Newfoundland on October 15.

== Impact ==
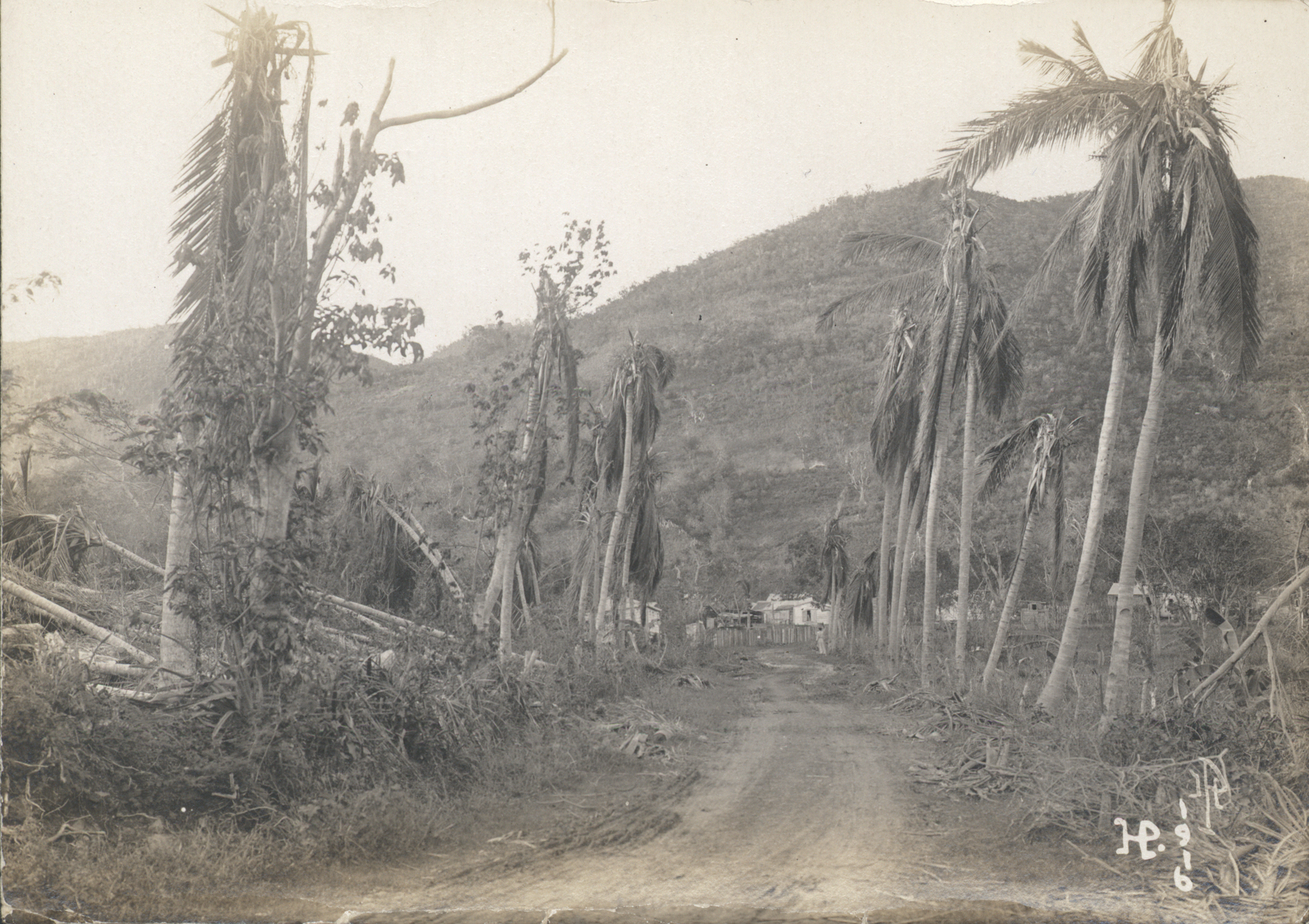
Saint Thomas was the most heavily impacted of the Danish West Indies.

=== Windward Islands and Puerto Rico ===
Inclement weather prevailed over the Windward Islands between October 7–8, yielding the storm's only discernible effects during its unclear origins. The developing system generated rough seas off Dominica; damaging waves in Roseau advanced well-inland. Jetties and shore roads were washed away by the surf. Parts of coastal villages and small craft were lost to the heavy seas. Buildings that had stood for 60–70 years were destroyed. Rural parts of the island experienced significant damage. Similar seas were reported on the evening of October 8 at Basseterre in Saint Kitts, where waves overtopped the island's seawall. Strong winds swept over eastern Puerto Rico on October 9 as the hurricane passed to the east. At San Juan, peak winds were just under gale-force, while winds faster than 50 mph (80 km/h) were measured farther east. At Naguabo, the winds held at or above gale-force for 14 hours, with a peak velocity of 70–75 mph (113–121 km/h). Buildings on a mostly abandoned U.S. naval station on Culebra were destroyed by the storm.

=== Virgin Islands ===
The hurricane greatly affected the entire Virgin Islands archipelago between the evening of October 9 through the morning of October 10. The islands' resources were already strained due to World War I, exacerbating the hurricane's impacts and thwarting measures implemented by the colonial authorities to bolster the economy of the Danish West Indies. One account called it the most destructive storm since the 1867 San Narciso hurricane. The American consulate in the Danish West Indies sent a cablegram to the U.S. State Department remarking that the hurricane was "the most disastrous known". Accounts of the hurricane in The Bulletin and Lightbourn's Mail Notes, newsletters in Saint Thomas, made similar judgements, as did American archaeologist Theodoor de Booy. There was little warning in advance of the storm's approach: the U.S. Weather Bureau transmitted general notices of the hurricane's path to points in the West Indies on October 8 while hurricane signals were sounded (Note: On Saint Thomas, the hurricane signal was sounded by the ship HMS Valkyrien firing her alarm guns twice, in addition to the hoisting of hurricane warning flags.) on the Virgin Islands on the afternoon of October 9 hours before landfall, leaving little time for residents to batten down.

==== Saint Thomas ====
With a mighty hand the storm king as with utmost fury struck an island-wide blow that has swept it from end to end, leaving it its path a trail of desolation and misery from which it will be slow, and in a sense impossible, to recover if outside help—prompt and ample—be not obtained.

— Account of the storm in The Bulletin, October 11, 1916

Of the Danish West Indies, Saint Thomas experienced the most severe effects from the hurricane. Nearly every building on the island incurred damage, and several among them were destroyed. Many buildings that remained standing were nonetheless wrecked beyond repair. Slave cabins were separated from their foundations and smashed into flinders against other buildings or trees. The severity of impacts was largely uniform throughout the island, though Savanne and Frenchman's Hill were most seriously affected. Severe flooding occurred in Charlotte Amalie, Frenchtown, and Lindbergh Bay. The 6–10 ft (1.8–3.0 m) storm surge tore buildings away from their foundations and inundated large tracts of land. Extensive losses were wrought upon shipping. The harbor at Saint Thomas, normally shielded from most tropical disturbances, saw extensive impacts; the harbor was most susceptible to a hurricane approaching from the south, as was the case in the 1916 hurricane. Steamers were grounded upon the island by the force of the wind-driven waves. Beached ships included the ocean liners Calabria and Wasgenwald of the Hamburg America Line and the Danish dredge St. Hilda. Calabria and Wasgenwald, both German ships, were interned in the Danish West Indies since the start of World War I. Calabria was considered a total loss and St. Hilda was reduced to smaller fragments. Two other Danish ships were severely damaged and many smaller vessels capsized. The distress vessel Blandford was the only ship in the harbor not moved from her moorings. Two electric harbor cranes operated by the West Indian Company and built to withstand a 100-mph (160 km/h) wind were mangled and partially strewn in the sea. Recent additions to the Saint Thomas harbor also sustained heavy blows. A machine shop was swept away by the sea.

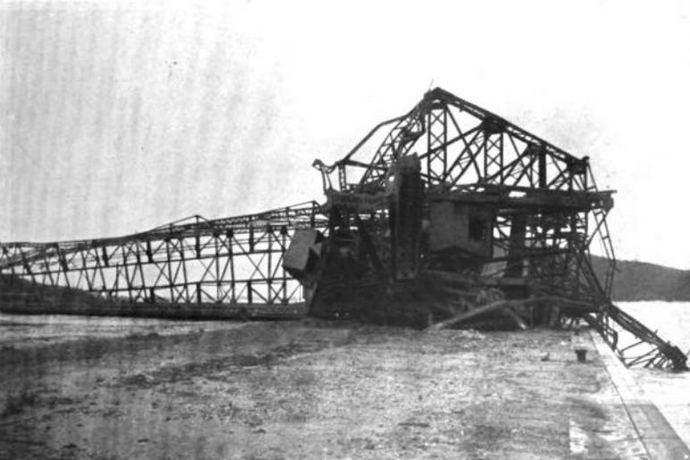
The harbor in Saint Thomas suffered a heavy blow.

Electric wires were blown down and warehouses were unroofed across Saint Thomas. The iron sheet roofs of homes were pried off by the wind. Many trees were uprooted or debarked. In the market square, trees laid mangled with communication and electric wires, littering public thoroughfares alongside amalgamations of wind-torn gutters and rooftop tiling. At the supply station of the West India and Panama Telegraph Company, ancillary buildings and storehouses were destroyed. Nearby, a coconut plantation was rendered infertile due to damage sustained to the tops of trees. As more sturdier structures, places of worship fared comparably well but were nevertheless subject to the violence of the winds; rectories were seriously damaged and a chapel was destroyed. Some people sought shelter in parsonages. In addition to the winds and surge, the hurricane also produced heavy rainfall; at Charlotte Amalie, the storm's rainfall total in 24 hours was a 1-in-20 year event. (Note: The return period refers to the probability of a given flood peak occurring over a period of time. A 20-year event, by definition, has a 5% chance happening in a specific year, although it is possible for such events to happen more than once over 20 years.) Merchant stocks were tarnished by the rainfall. Four deaths—all drownings—were documented at Saint Thomas; these occurred at the harbor in addition to several injuries.

==== Other islands ====
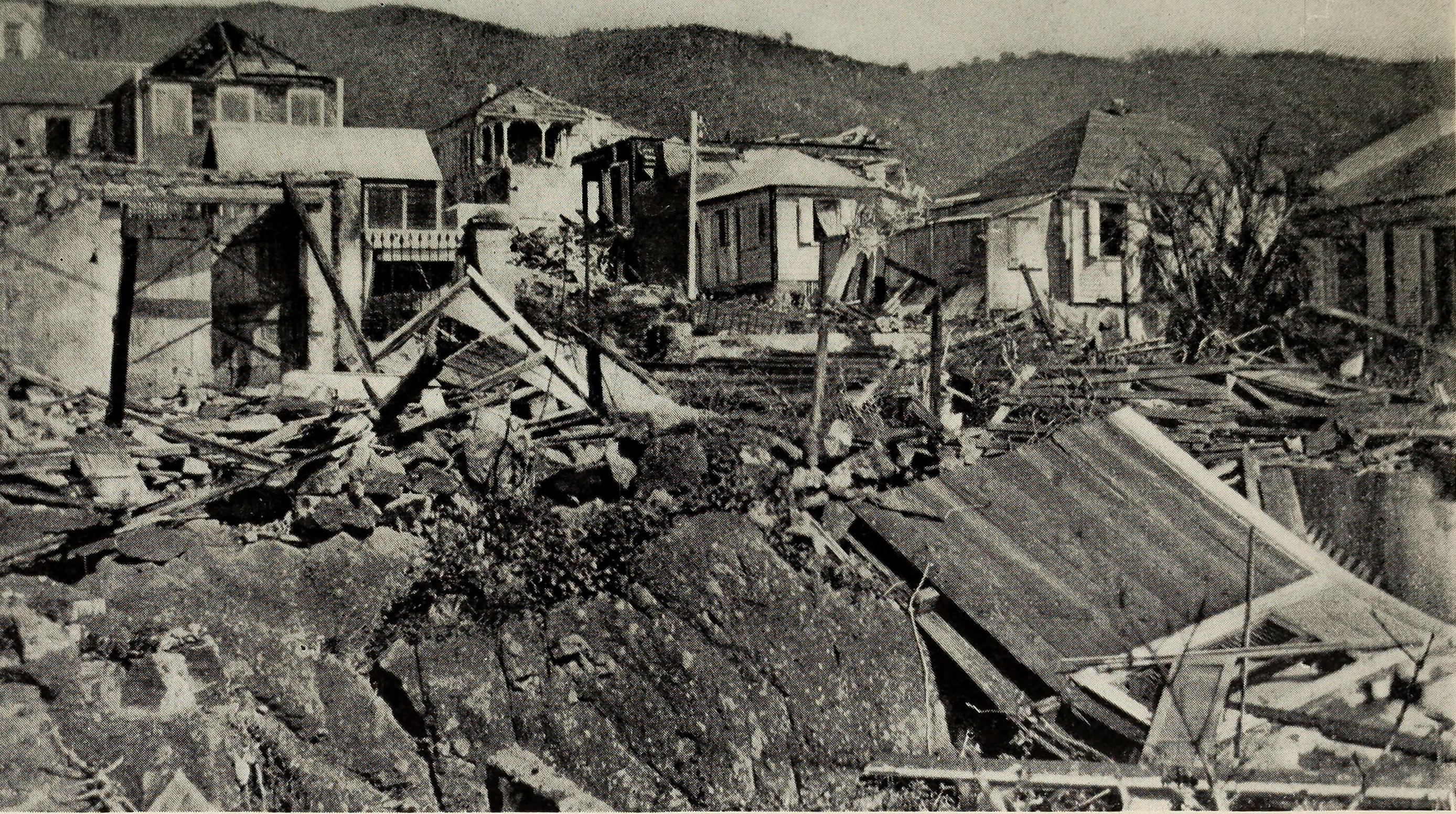
Damage in Saint Croix

On Saint Croix, destruction befell entire towns and many factories. The town of Christiansted reported extensive damage. The schooner Vigilant capsized in the Christiansted reef; the ship was raised after sinking in the 1876 San Felipe hurricane only to suffer the same fate in 1916. In Frederiksted, saltwater was found on the upper-stories of residences, marking the height of the storm's waves. The roof of one home destroyed a stable and a few rooms after being blown away. Ninety percent of fences and most trees were knocked down. Heavy damage was also wrought in rural areas of Saint Croix, where telecommunications were disrupted. At several settlements, homes were badly damaged; only 4 homes of 23–25 at an estate in Annaly were destroyed. Anegada, Tortola, and Saint John of the Virgin Islands were devastated by the hurricane. At Tortola the hurricane's winds were strongest on the evening of October 9, holding at around 100 mph (160 km/h) for an hour. A report sent to The Sun, a New York-based newspaper, enumerated thirty-two fatalities in Tortola and eight in Saint John. However, a later report indicated five deaths combined in Saint Croix and Saint John from injuries caused by falling walls or trees. More than 50 people were injured in Saint John. Nearly all houses on the Saint John and Tortola were destroyed. Most boats at Tortola were destroyed, and some were dispersed by the storm's wind and waves on inland hills. Significant damage was dealt to the island's crops. Two thousand people were displaced by the storm in Tortola. Across three settlements in Saint John, all houses except one were razed. Swaths of trees were denuded in some areas of the island. Although the force of the storm was stronger on Saint John than on Saint Thomas, the island's lower population led to a lesser monetary toll to infrastructure; however, total casualties were higher in Saint John due to a lack of communications, leaving the island's residents unaware of the storm's approach.

== Aftermath ==
Many residents across the Danish West Indies were rendered destitute, with two-thirds in need of food and clothing and a third needing shelter. Damage from the hurricane was initially estimated by the American consulate at $2 million. (Note: All monetary values are in 1916 United States dollars unless otherwise indicated.) However, further surveys of the damage suggested a smaller toll. Christopher Payne, the American Consul General to the Danish West Indies, appealed for $50,000 in immediate relief. The government of the Danish West Indies provisioned $5,000 for relief on October 11. Some of the funds allowed the poor to build new homes, though other parts were loaned without interest. Crews were dispatched to repair effaced mountain roads. Further assistance was provided by the Danish Ministry of Finance. HMS Valkyrien embarked on a search-and-rescue operation following the storm, extracting survivors from the stricken barquentine Thor. The Valkyrien's junior surgeon was sent to Saint John to render assistance due to a lack of any medical personnel on the island. Galvanized by the devastation wrought by the hurricane, coal carriers—workers who refueled coal-powered ships—in Saint Thomas went on a successful strike to demand increased wages, ultimately forming a union with 2,700 members and negotiating a doubling of their pay.

The loss of trees and foliage on Saint Croix caused by the storm led to decreased outputs of bananas, cocoa, mangoes, oranges, and pineapples; virtually every fruit tree was destroyed by the hurricane. In Saint John, oil extraction from the bay tree (Pimenta acris) in 1917 was a quarter of the annual average; many of the trees were stripped of their leaves. The lime industry was suspended by the severity of damage inflicted upon lime trees; the storm struck amid an effort to establish lime groves on abandoned estates. Difficult living conditions for older populations following the loss of homes and roofs led to increased mortality rates among those older than 40 years old in 1917; mortality rates recovered to longer-term averages by 1918. The extent of the damage to Saint Thomas's harbor may have increased support for the sale of the Danish West Indies to the United States in the 1916 Danish West Indian Islands sale referendum.

== See also ==
- 1876 San Felipe hurricane
- 1898 Windward Islands hurricane
- Hurricane Omar
- Hurricane Marilyn
- Hurricane Lenny
