= 1916 Pensacola hurricane =

Category 2 Atlantic hurricane in 1916

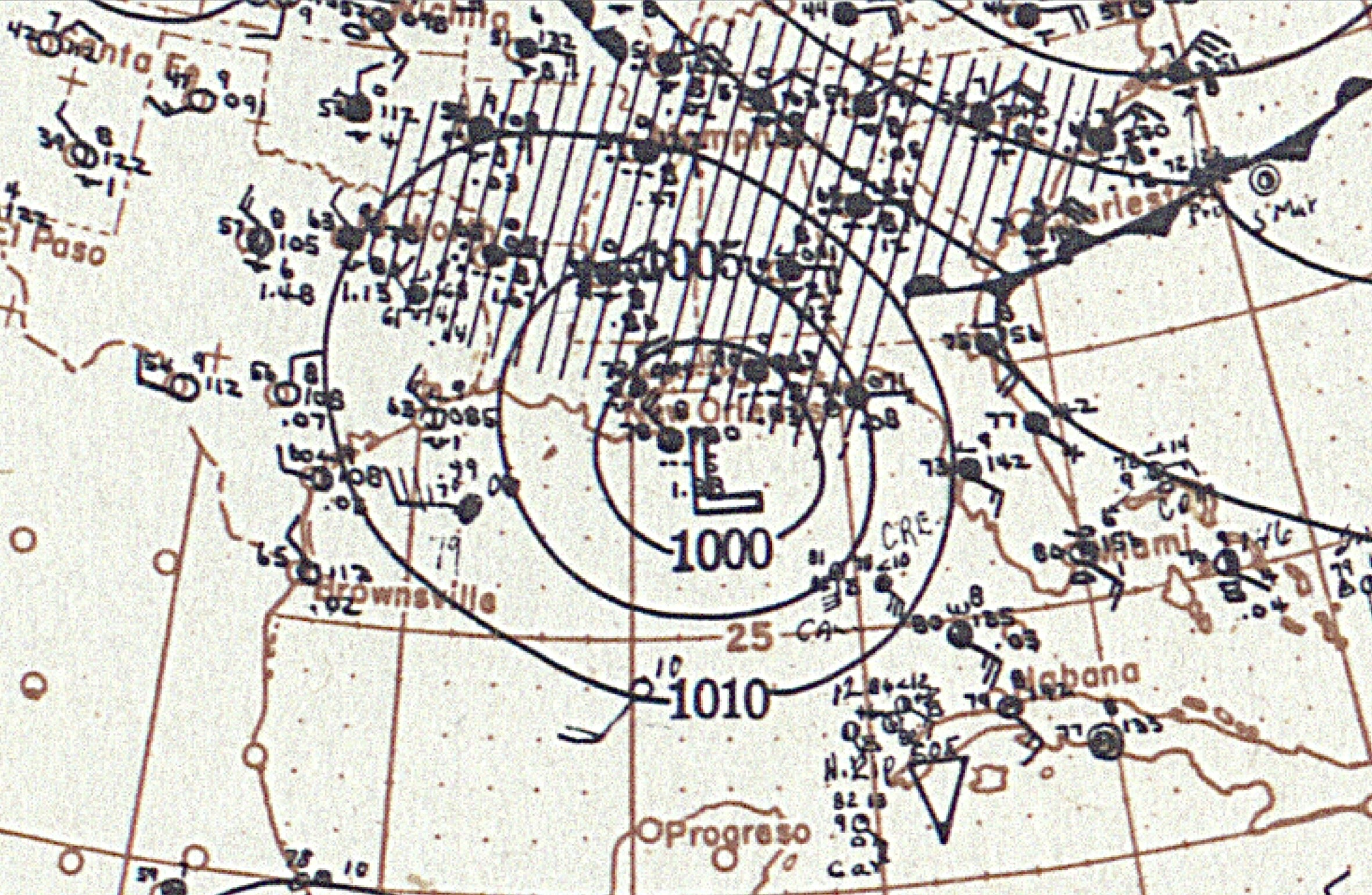
- Surface weather analysis of the hurricane near landfall and at peak strength in the Gulf of Mexico on October 18; also indicated are isobars, weather fronts, and areas of precipitation (shaded)

Meteorological history
- Formed: October 9, 1916
- Dissipated: October 19, 1916

Category 2 hurricane
- 1-minute sustained (SSHWS/NWS)
- Highest winds: 110 mph (175 km/h)
- Lowest pressure: 970 mbar (hPa); 28.64 inHg

Overall effects
- Fatalities: 29
- Damage: $100,000 (1916 USD)
- Areas affected: Swan Islands; Yucatán Peninsula; British Honduras; U.S. Gulf Coast; Midwestern United States; Great Lakes region
- Part of the 1916 Atlantic hurricane season

The 1916 Pensacola hurricane was a tropical cyclone that swept across the western Caribbean Sea and Gulf of Mexico in October 1916. It was the last hurricane of the 1916 Atlantic hurricane season, forming as a tropical depression near Jamaica on October 9 and moved slowly southwest and west, taking an unusual track for storms in October. Intensification was initially slow, but proceeded in earnest after October 11 as the depression strengthened into a tropical storm and then a hurricane. It passed over the Swan Islands before moving ashore the Yucatán Peninsula on October 15 near the border between British Honduras and Mexico. Plantains and coconuts in British Honduras sustained harsh losses. Twenty people were killed following the loss of a ship in the western Caribbean. The tropical cyclone weakened as it moved across the peninsula and curved north into the Gulf of Mexico on October 16.

The hurricane restrengthened as it accelerated towards the U.S. Gulf Coast, reaching a peak with winds of 110 mph (180 km/h) shortly before making landfall near Pensacola, Florida, on the morning of October 18. Records for extreme wind velocities were set in Pensacola and in Mobile, Alabama, where gusts above 120 mph (190 km/h) were recorded. Two people were killed in Alabama. However, the storm's quick movement into the coast reduced the associated storm surge and rainfall, lessening the damage wrought by the hurricane. Total property damage in the Pensacola area amounted to approximately $100,000. (Note: All monetary values are in 1916 United States dollars unless otherwise indicated.) In Louisiana, the storm's rainfall was beneficial for crops struggling from a concurrent drought. After moving inland, the storm weakened and merged with another area of low pressure near the Great Lakes on October 19. The resulting storm produced gusty winds over much of the Eastern United States and was blamed for the loss of 49 lives on Lake Erie in what became known as Black Friday.

== Meteorological history ==
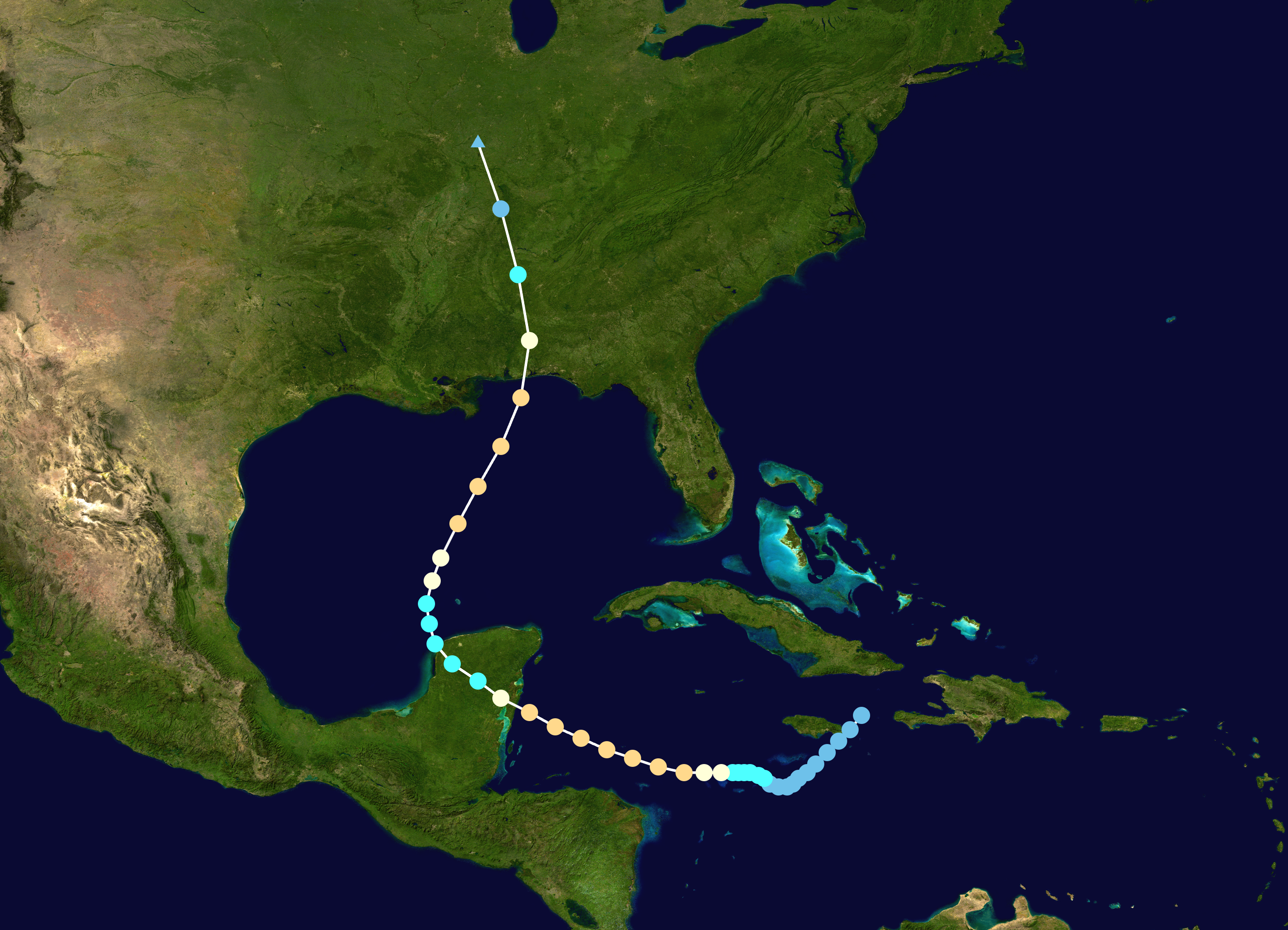
Map plotting the storm's track and intensity, according to the Saffir–Simpson scale Map key Saffir–Simpson scale Tropical depression (≤38 mph, ≤62 km/h) Tropical storm (39–73 mph, 63–118 km/h) Category 1 (74–95 mph, 119–153 km/h) Category 2 (96–110 mph, 154–177 km/h) Category 3 (111–129 mph, 178–208 km/h) Category 4 (130–156 mph, 209–251 km/h) Category 5 (≥157 mph, ≥252 km/h) Unknown Storm type Tropical cyclone Subtropical cyclone Extratropical cyclone, remnant low, tropical disturbance, or monsoon depression

In the wake of an earlier hurricane over the Virgin Islands, lowered air pressures prevailed over the Caribbean Sea in mid-October. The 1916 Pensacola hurricane arose from this broad area of low pressure, though its initial developments were not well-observed; a summary of the storm in the October 1916 issue of the Monthly Weather Review described its origins as "uncertain". The Jamaican Weather Service noted that it was difficult to differentiate the barometric influence of the developing tropical cyclone from the Virgin Islands hurricane. A reanalysis of the hurricane, conducted by the Atlantic Oceanographic and Meteorological Laboratory in 2008, determined that it began as a tropical depression east of Jamaica on October 9. The depression moved slowly southwest for the next two days without much fluctuation in its strength. At the time, the Weather Bureau first noted the storm's cyclonic nature on October 11, but nonetheless the available observations suggested the cyclone was of meager intensity south of Jamaica. The storm then turned west and quickly strengthened, becoming a tropical storm on October 12 and a hurricane the following day.

On October 14, its maximum sustained winds topped out at 110 mph (180 km/h) based on nearby observations taken on the Swan Islands. The hurricane maintained these winds for the remainder of its trek in the western Caribbean, eventually making landfall on the Yucatán Peninsula just north of the British Honduras–Mexico border on October 15. The hurricane weakened as it traversed the Yucatán Peninsula and emerged into the Gulf of Mexico as a tropical storm by 12:00 UTC on October 16. Up until that point, the storm's sustained westward trek in tropical latitudes was unprecedented for an October hurricane. After reaching the Gulf of Mexico, the cyclone then curved towards the central Gulf and restrengthened, attaining hurricane intensity on October 17. As it was accelerating north towards the central U.S. Gulf Coast on October 18, the hurricane's winds once again reached 110 mph (180 km/h), equivalent to a Category 2 on the modern Saffir–Simpson scale. With this intensity, the hurricane made landfall near Pensacola, Florida, at 14:00 UTC that day. Its central pressure was estimated to have been 970 mbar (hPa; 28.64 inHg). Pensacola briefly experienced the storm's calm center. The storm quickly weakened after moving inland, tracking over Alabama, Tennessee, Kentucky, and Illinois before ultimately merging with another area of low pressure near the Great Lakes by 12:00 UTC on October 19. This resulting combined system was initially broad and diffuse, but a dominant center of circulation soon emerged over Illinois on October 19. This new storm tracked northeast into the Great Lakes region and was last observed crossing Ontario.

== Preparations and impact ==
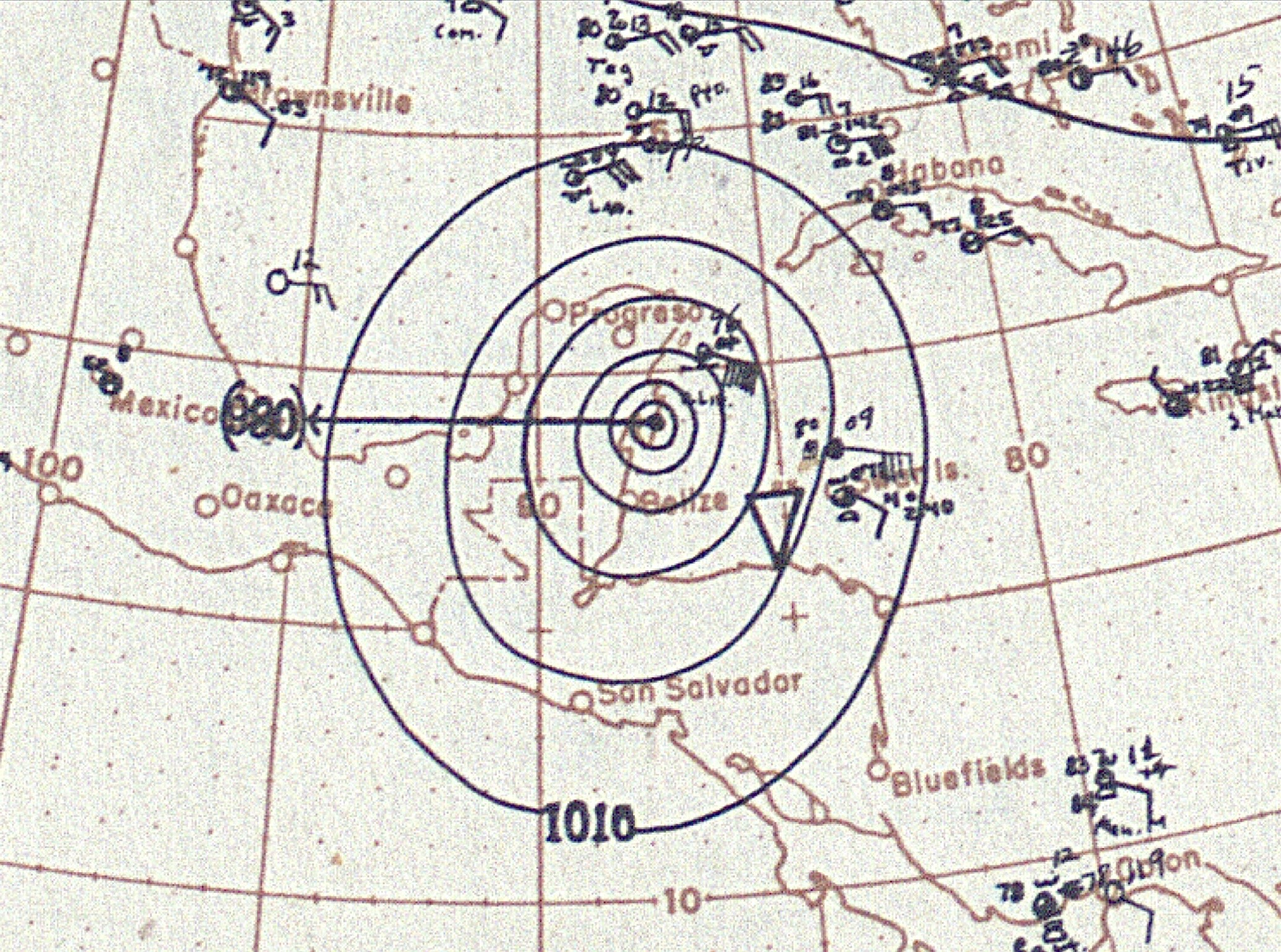
Surface weather analysis of the hurricane making landfall in the Yucatán Peninsula on October 15

Communications with the Swan Islands were disrupted as the hurricane passed nearby. Three wireless towers were destroyed and two thousand coconut trees were blown down. Buildings sustained slight damage. Several barges were grounded on the Swan Islands' shores. Twenty people were killed following a ship's sinking in the western Caribbean. Most plantains and hundreds of coconut trees in the British Honduras were destroyed by the hurricane. Heavy rainfall was documented on the Yucatán Peninsula.

Beginning on October 14, the Weather Bureau began advising ships in the Gulf of Mexico of the storm's possible approach via the Yucatán Channel. Storm warnings were issued by the Weather Bureau for a stretch of the U.S. Gulf Coast between Bay St. Louis, Mississippi, and Carrabelle, Florida, on the morning of October 17. Hurricane warnings were issued for areas between New Orleans, Louisiana, and Apalachicola, Florida, on October 18 as the cyclone drew nearer. Storm warnings were also issued on the Eastern Seaboard between Savannah, Georgia, and Cape Henry, Virginia, and additional warnings for damaging gale-force winds were issued for inland areas in Alabama, western Georgia, northwestern Florida, and Mississippi. These alerts were radioed to coastal interests and yielded enough time for substantial precautionary measures to be put in place. The warnings advised for ships to remain in port. Eight ships bound for Central Americana and European ports remained anchored at the mouth of the Mississippi River. A hundred fishing schooners operating in the wetlands of Louisiana fled for Biloxi, Mississippi, to avoid the storm. The United States Coast Guard dispatched the cutter Tallapoosa to render assistance to vessels in distress if necessary. Shipping firms authorized the resumption of shipping operations at noon on October 18. The perceived threat of the hurricane to Alabama's cotton-growing regions caused the price of cotton at the New Orleans Cotton Exchange to advance by $4.50 per bale, reaching autumnal highs unseen since the Civil War. On the evening of October 18, all warnings concerning the hurricane's landfall were terminated.

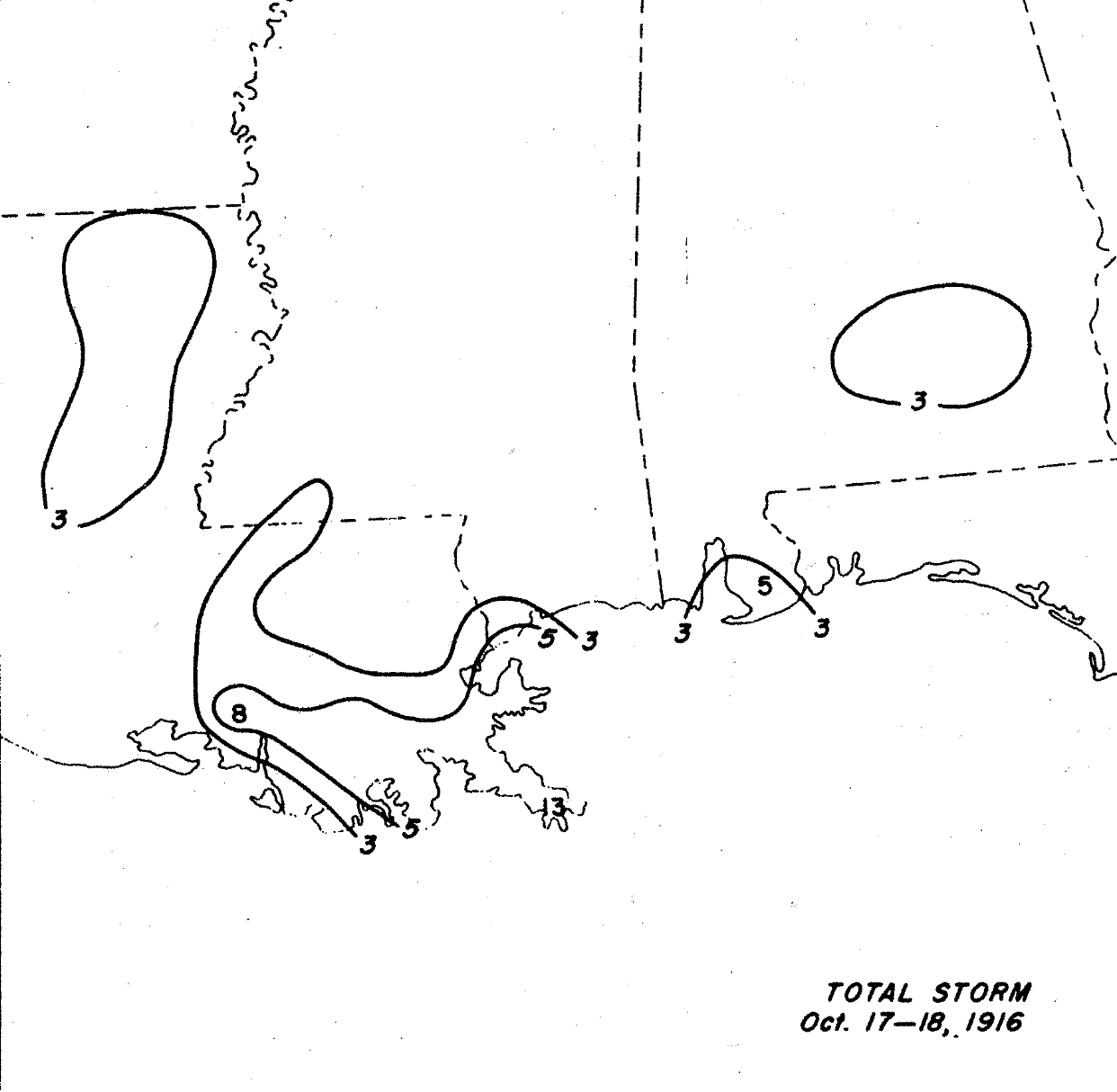
Rainfall totals between October 17–18 associated with the storm in the United States

Category 2 hurricane conditions were experienced in Alabama and the Florida Panhandle. The storm's damaging effects were localized; in Florida, damage was limited to the Pensacola area. At the coast, the hurricane produced a storm surge generally 3–4 ft (0.91–1.22 m) above mean tide. These values were low relative to the storm's intensity due to the storm's small size and fast forward speed at landfall. Rough seas along Santa Rosa Island and the Fairpoint Peninsula caused $10,000 in damage to railroads as embankments were eroded. Most of the damage associated with the hurricane at its Gulf landfall was caused by the strong winds that accompanied the storm. Mobile, Alabama, recorded a peak gust of 120 mph (190 km/h), while a peak gust of 128 mph (206 km/h) was registered in Pensacola, Florida. These were new highs for both cities, topping records set three months prior in the 1916 Gulf Coast hurricane. One-minute sustained winds of 94 mph (151 km/h) were also documented in the two cities. (Note: Five-minute sustained winds of 115 mph (185 km/h) were originally recorded in both Mobile, Alabama, and Pensacola, Florida. However, wind tunnel research beginning in the 1920s found that the era's four-cup anemometers exhibited a high bias. The 94 mph (151 km/h) figure arises from correcting for this high bias and adjusting five-minute sustained winds to one-minute sustained winds as done by the Atlantic hurricane reanalysis project.) The anemometer in Pensacola was blown away a minute after recording the peak gust and shortly before the storm's eye passed overhead. The winds damaged fences, roofs, signs, and trees. In Pensacola, 200 trees were felled. Several ships were lost in the Pensacola harbor and many small craft were damaged. Three schooners were driven ashore. The sinking of the steamship Flanders off Pensacola killed one person. Plateglass windows were smashed; a 13-year-old boy sustained injuries after being defenestrated by the winds. All electric and communication wires in Pensacola were knocked out of commission for 12 hours. Storm damage suspended rail service between the city and Jacksonville, Florida, for a week. The roof of a school was almost entirely peeled away. At the Pensacola Naval Yard, an office building was unroofed and the sheathing of the hangar was partially torn off.

In Alabama, the heaviest damage occurred in Dale, Covington, and Coffee counties. Strong winds blew down homes and timber. Mobile was caught in the storm's core for two hours. A steamship sank and two large ships were driven aground. One steamship, the James A. Carney, partially sunk in her dry dock after being raised following the 1916 Gulf Coast hurricane. Many smaller skiffs and launches in the Mobile area were driven ashore or capsized. Damage was relatively light in the city proper, totaling a few thousand dollars. Two buildings in the business district were unroofed and plateglass windows were broken. Communications wires were downed on the morning of October 18, though restorations of telecommunications began within hours. Trains in Mobile bound for New Orleans, Louisiana, and Mobile-bound trains from Montgomery, Alabama, were halted due to the loss of communications. Seven people were killed when a home was razed. One person was killed due to electrocution by a live electric wire. Electric crews from Albany, Alabama, were dispatched to repair telecommunications infrastructure in the Mobile area. Other towns in South Alabama reported homes unroofed and trees blown down, but without loss of life.

Rainfall associated with the hurricane was heaviest farther away from the storm's center to the west and east, with totals above 5 in (130 mm) across much of the Mississippi River Delta. Most rain occurred ahead of the system as it was approaching the coast, with drier conditions prevailing to the storm's south after it moved inland. At Burrwood, Louisiana, the storm produced 12.8 in (330 mm) of rain overall; 11.88 in (302 mm) of rain fell in the 24-hours ending on the morning of October 18. Five stations, including the one at Burwood, set 24-hour rainfall records during the hurricane's passage. Rainfall in the state proved beneficial, relieving drought conditions and helping to restore struggling crops.

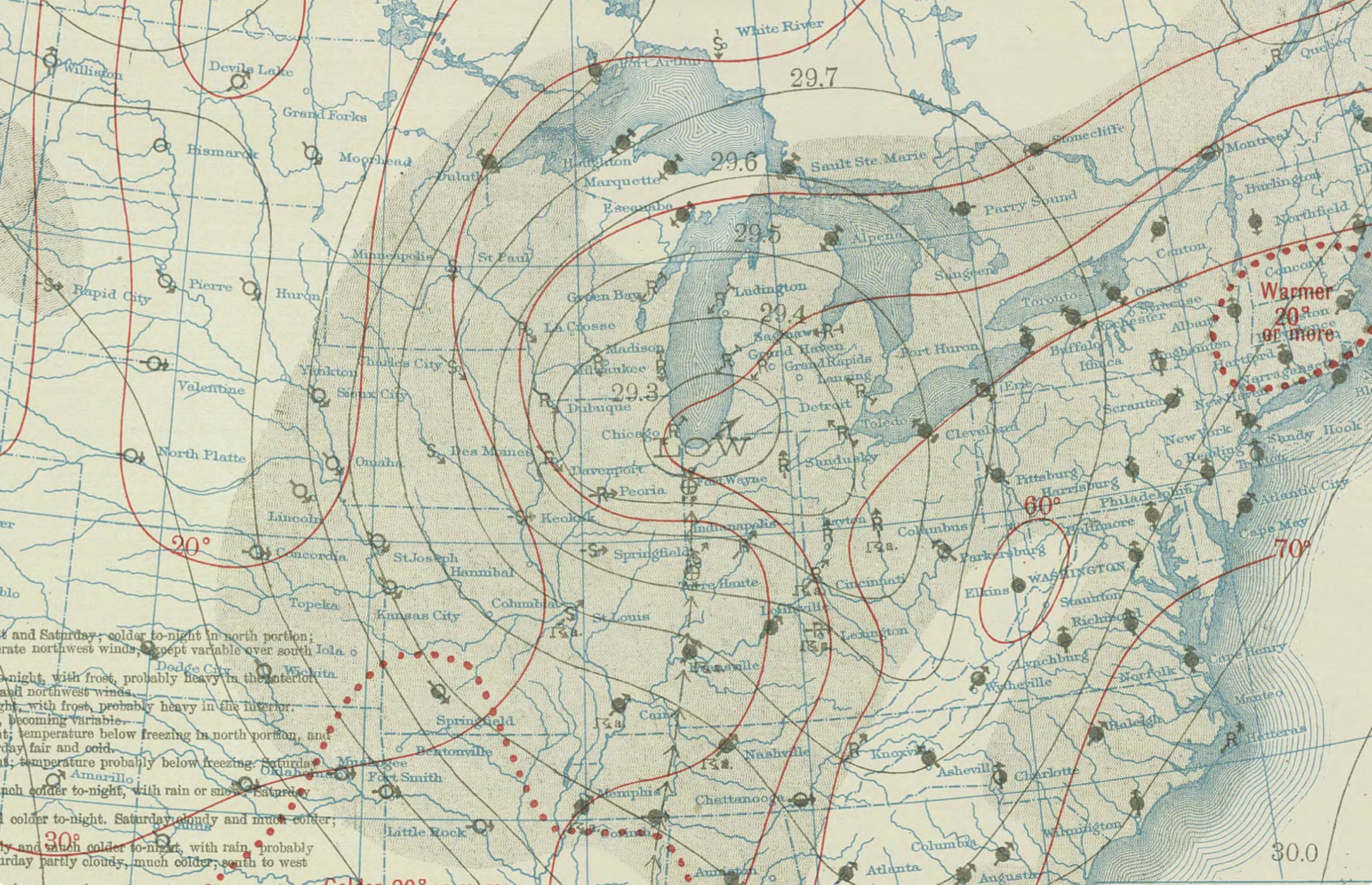
Weather map of the hurricane’s remnants over the Great Lakes on October 20

Despite the intensity of the hurricane, the warnings from the Weather Bureau combined with the storm's small size and fast motion kept losses low along the Gulf coast, reducing the damage potential of storm surge and rainfall. Total property damage in the Mobile and Pensacola area was approximately $100,000. Shipping interests incurred about $25,000 in losses. The storm's extratropical stages contributed to the formation of a powerful storm that brought gusty winds throughout all of the Great Lakes and gale-force winds off the coasts of the Mid-Atlantic states and New England between October 15–20. Winds reaching 60–75 mph (97–121 km/h) on Lake Erie claimed the lives of 49 people and sank 4 ships in what became known as Black Friday. The influence of this system was extensive; in Florida, the cold temperatures brought equatorward by the cyclone were still in place through October 23.

== See also ==
- List of Florida hurricanes (1900–1949)
- List of Alabama hurricanes
- Hurricane Baker (1950) – struck a similar area of the Gulf coast
- 1916 Irondale earthquake – occurred as the hurricane was making landfall

Other storms that transitioned into or fueled damaging extratropical cyclones

- Hurricane Grace (1991) – led to the formation of the 1991 Perfect Storm
- Hurricane Ida – helped fuel the November 2009 nor'easter
- Hurricane Hazel – its extratropical stages were particularly deadly in the Toronto area
