= Water Tower Hellevoetsluis =

- Watertoren in Hellevoetsluis
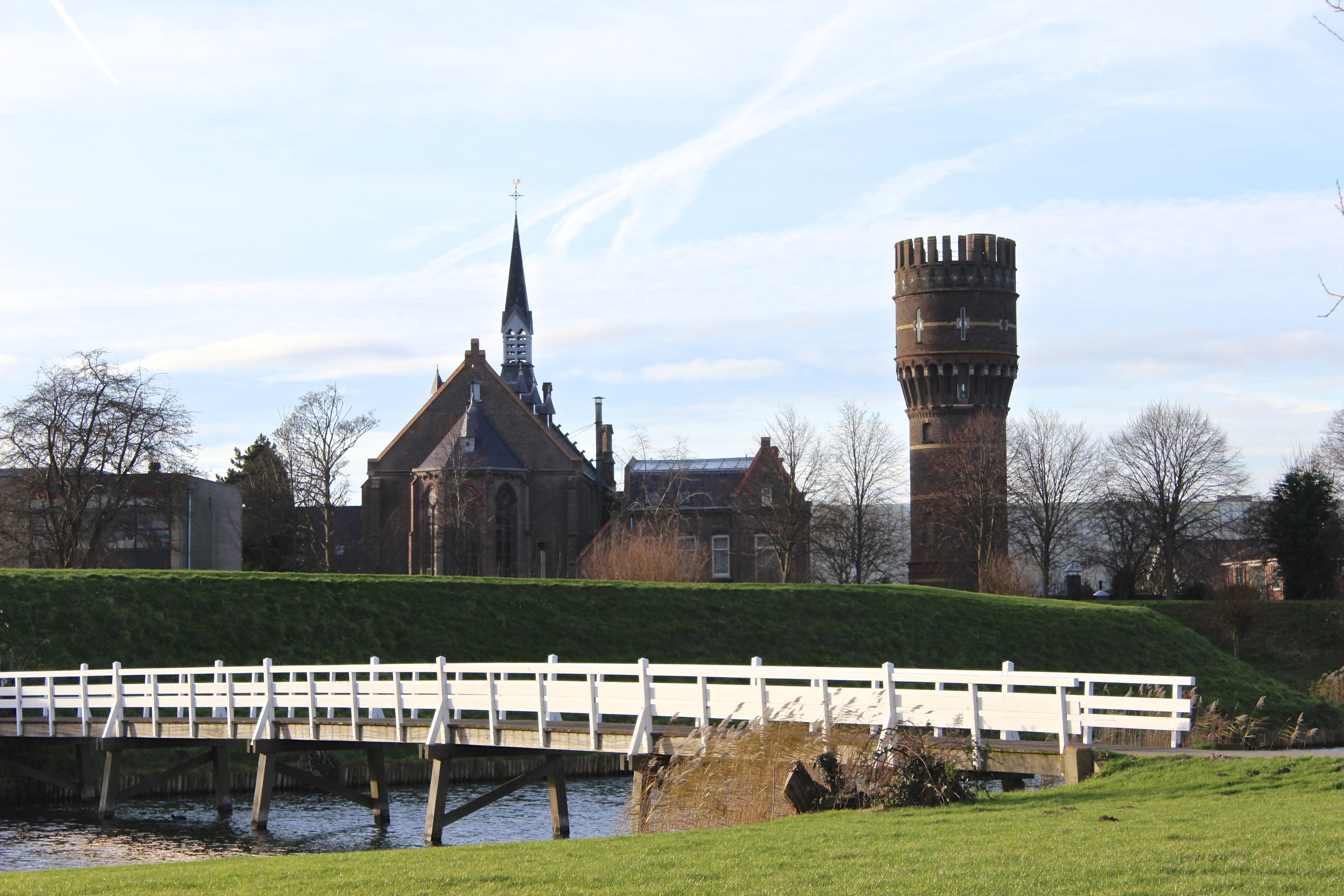
- The Water Tower and Anthony of Padua church
- Interactive map of the Water Tower Hellevoetsluis area

General information
- Type: Water tower
- Location: Opzoomerlaan 112, Hellevoetsluis, Netherlands
- Coordinates: 36.696°N 53.508°E
- Completed: 1896

Design and construction
- Designations: Water tower

The Water Tower in Hellevoetsluis was designed by architect N. Biezeveld and built in 1896.

The water tower is 22 metres (72 ft) high and has two reservoirs, each with a capacity of 60 cubic metres (13,000 imp gal).

== History ==
It took many years before Hellevoetsluis got a piped water supply. Before that time, the navy operated a watership, with which they fetched water from the Meuse. The navy threatened the schout-bij-nacht that they would leave the city unless a supply of water was secured. This threat led to the construction of the water tower in 1896. It came into operation on 31 August 1896, Hellevoetsluis becoming the first municipality on the island of Voorne-Putten with a piped water supply.

In 1965, the water tower was decommissioned and sold for a symbolic sum of 1 Dutch guilder.
