= De Hoop, Hellevoetsluis =

Dutch windmill

De Hoop
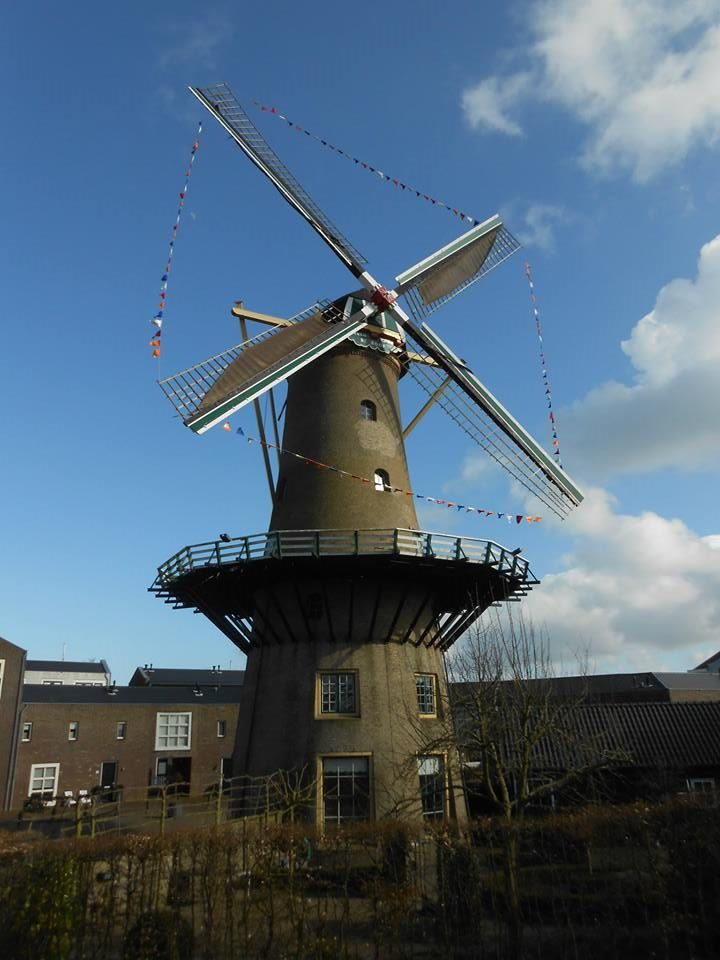

Origin
- Mill location: Molenstraat 43
- Coordinates: 51.8242°N 4.1275°E
- Operator(s): J.W. Hage and others
- Year built: 1801

Information
- Purpose: flour grinding
- Type: round stone scaffolding mill
- Type of sails: Old Dutch
- No. of pairs of millstones: 2

De Hoop is a gristmill in Hellevoetsluis, the Netherlands. The mill was built in 1801.

== History ==
In 1697 there was a post mill on the place of caisson Jan Blancen. Dirk Jacobsz Goutswaart is named as the first miller. At the end of the 18th century, this mill needed to make place for this caisson.

The stone scaffolding mill was built in 1801. In 1960, the mill was bought by the municipality Hellevoetsluis. There was a restoration in 1963.

The mill had a sack hoist where flour carts could drive under, to be loaded or unloaded. This lap was repaired at a restoration in 1961-1962.

Till the restoration of 1992-1993, an architectural firm, a smith and various artists used the mill.

Nowadays, the current miller and his partner, live at the ground floor and first floor of the mill.

The mill is opened every Sunday from 12.00 CET till 16.00 CET for public during the months May till September.
