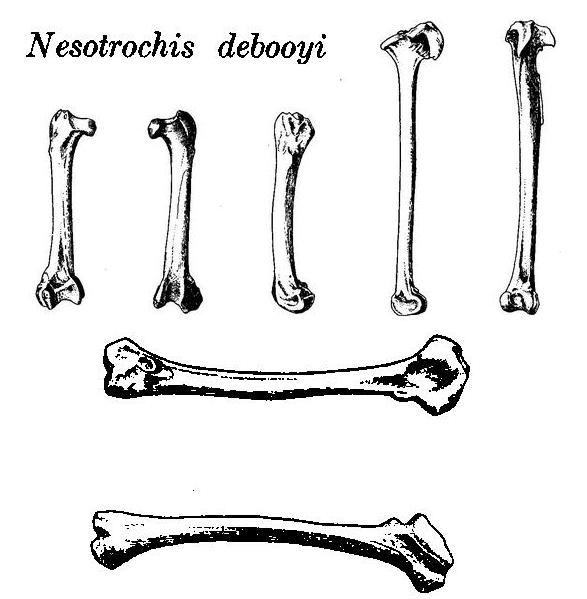
- Leg and foot bones

Scientific classification
- Kingdom: Animalia
- Phylum: Chordata
- Class: Aves
- Order: Gruiformes
- Family: †Nesotrochidae
- Genus: †Nesotrochis
- Species: †N. debooyi

Binomial name
- †Nesotrochis debooyi Wetmore, 1918
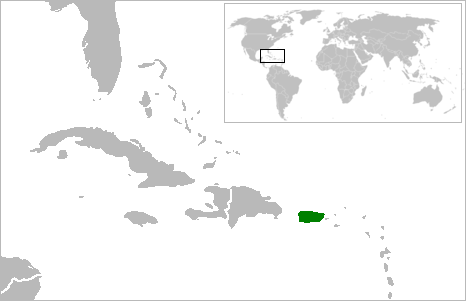
- Location of Puerto Rico.

= Antillean cave rail =

Antillean cave rail Temporal range: Late Pleistocene–Early Holocene

Extinct species of bird

The Antillean cave rail (Nesotrochis debooyi), also known as DeBooy's rail, is an extinct species of flightless bird which occurred on Puerto Rico and the United States Virgin Islands.

== Extinction ==
Bone fragments of this species were first unearthed by archaeologist Theodoor de Booy in kitchen midden deposits on the Richmond estate near Christiansted, U.S. Virgin Islands in July 1916 and described by Alexander Wetmore in 1918. The Antillean cave rail might have become extinct before the arrival of Europeans.
