= 1916 Black Friday storm =

Weather event in North America

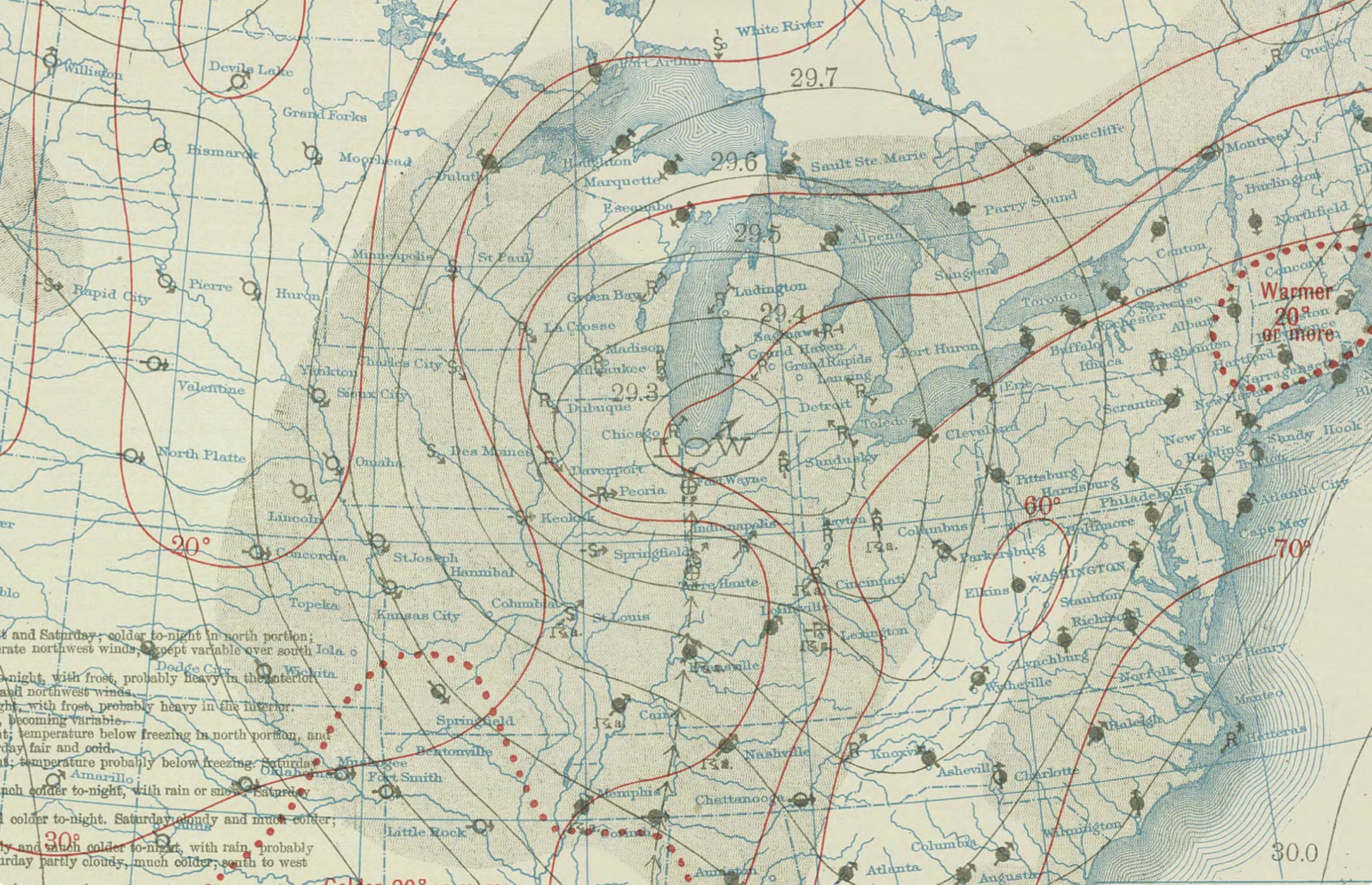
Surface weather map of the storm over the Great Lakes on October 20

The 1916 Black Friday storm was a large storm that passed over Lake Erie on Friday, October 20, 1916. Dubbed "Black Friday", the "perfect storm" sank four large ships, killing forty-nine people. The ships that were sunk by the violent weather were James B. Colgate, Marshall F. Butters, D. L. Filer and Mérida. In the western part of the lake, "the convergence of two high pressure systems and a minor hurricane" created the large storm that day.

== Individual ships ==
The whaleback freighter James B. Colgate was on its way to Thunder Bay when it sank at approximately 10 p.m. near Blenheim, Ontario. Only the vessel's captain survived the disaster. The wreck was later discovered on the lakebed.

The wooden-hulled lumber carrier Marshall F. Butters, departing from Midland, Ontario, went down near the Detroit River. All thirteen crew members were rescued by two nearby ships. The wreck has been located. One of the survivors provided a detailed firsthand account of the sinking and the rescue.

D.L. Filer, a 45-year-old schooner, also sank near the mouth of the Detroit River. Only the captain survived, and he was not rescued until the following day. The wreck remains undiscovered.

Merida, a Canadian steamer, was lost with all twenty-three crew members. Their bodies were later found, still wearing life vests. The wreck has been located.
