= Hellevoetsluis =

- Town
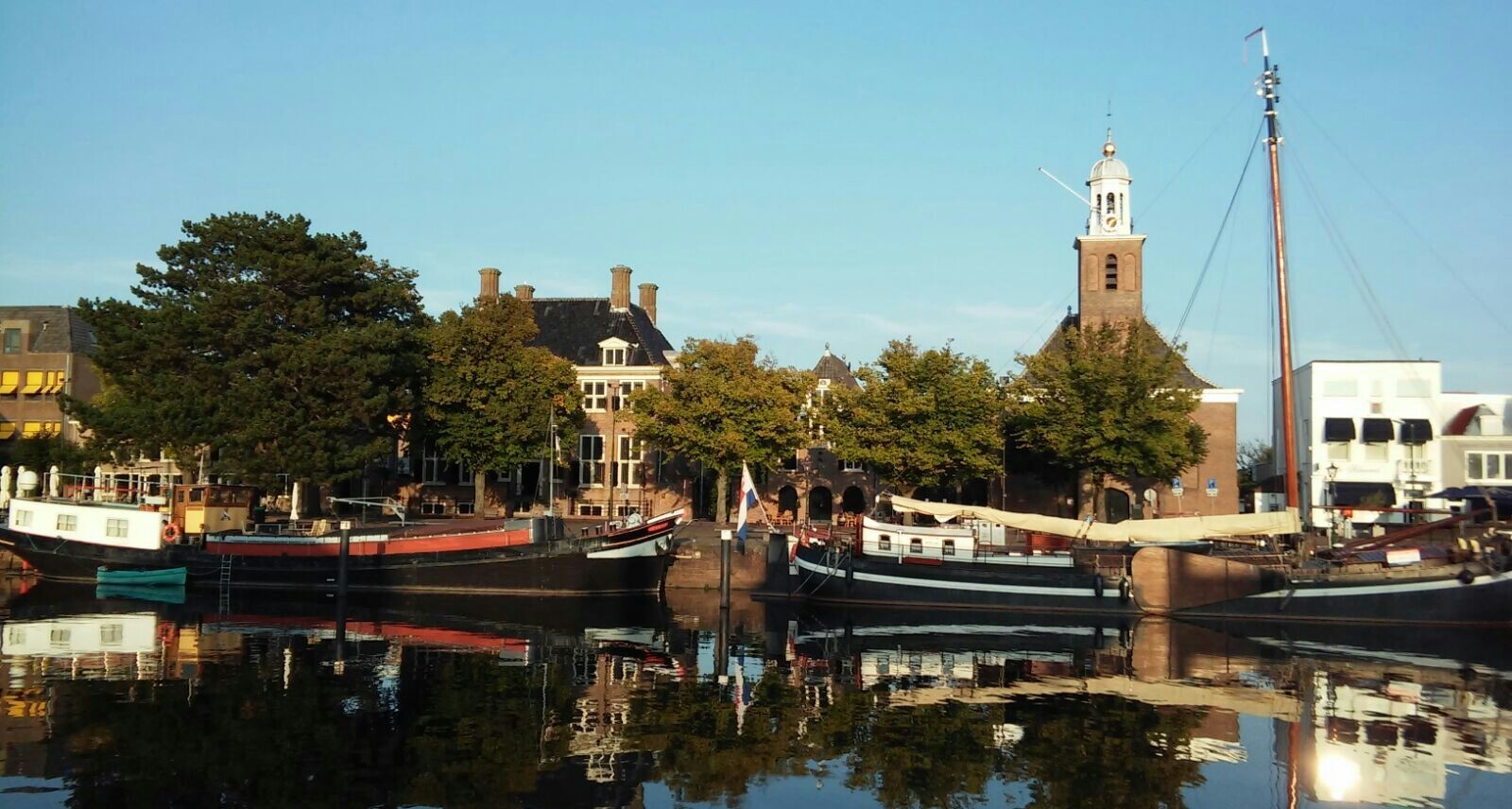

- Flag Coat of arms

- Location in South Holland
- Coordinates: 51°49′N 4°8′E
- Country: Netherlands
- Province: South Holland
- Municipality: Voorne aan Zee

Area
  - Total: 61.20 km^{2} (23.63 sq mi)
  - Land: 41.10 km^{2} (15.87 sq mi)
  - Water: 20.10 km^{2} (7.76 sq mi)
- Elevation: 2 m (6.6 ft)

Population (January 2021)
  - Total: 40,312
  - Density: 981/km^{2} (2,540/sq mi)
- Demonym: Hellevoeter
- Time zone: UTC+1 (CET)
  - Summer (DST): UTC+2 (CEST)
- Postcode: 3220–3225
- Area code: 0181
- Website: www.hellevoetsluis.nl

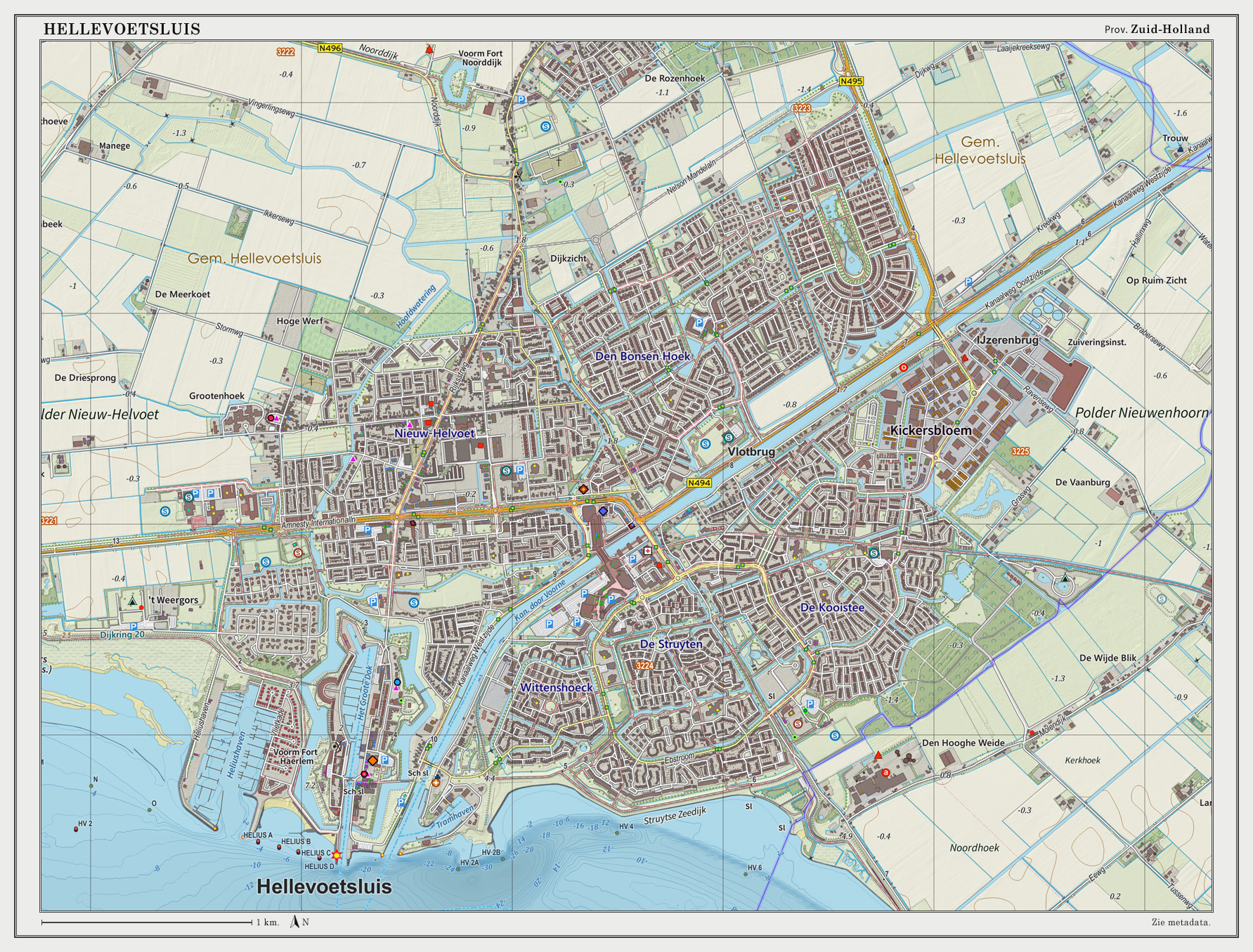
Dutch Topographic map of Hellevoetsluis (town), Sept. 2014

Hellevoetsluis (Dutch pronunciation: [ˌɦɛləvutˈslœys]) is a town and former municipality in the west of Netherlands. It is located in Voorne-Putten, South Holland. The former municipality covered an area of 61.20 km^{2} (23.63 sq mi) of which 20.10 km^{2} (7.76 sq mi) was water and it included the population centres of Nieuw-Helvoet, Nieuwenhoorn, and Oude en Nieuwe Struiten, all former municipalities.

Hellevoetsluis is located on the Haringvliet with the sea, beach, and dunes close by, on the extreme southern edge of the Rijnmond and Europoort areas, close to the broad Zeeland landscape. The name translates as "lock at the foot of the Helle". The Helle was a small local river that disappeared over time.

On 1 January 2023, the municipality of Hellevoetsluis merged with Brielle and Westvoorne into the new municipality of Voorne aan Zee.

== History ==
The area has been settled since before Roman times and was concentrated around a body of water called the "Helle", which was later Latinized by the Romans to "Helinium" and "Helius". The name Hel(le) Voet, Helius' foot or "(land at) the lowest point of Helius", appears in documents from the 13th century and later, such as in 1395, when the Nieuw-Helvoet Polder is issued for inspection. This polder had a drainage sluice (Dutch: "sluis") in the southern dike: the Hellevoetse sluis.

The history of Hellevoetsluis has always been connected with water. During the time of the Eighty Year's War and the forming of the United Provinces Hellevoetsluis was the naval port of the Admiralty of de Maze (Rotterdam) and could accommodate an entire fleet within a special land-enclosed fortress with harbour and dockyard facilities, accessible through a canal. Thanks to its strategic situation the town grew from the beginning of the 17th century to be the homeport for the Dutch war fleet. In later years the port was fortified more and more and Hellevoetsluis, therefore, became a unique combination of a fortified town and a naval port. The Admirals Maarten Tromp, Michiel de Ruyter, and Piet Heyn had their home base here and in 1688 during the Glorious Revolution William III of Orange's invasion fleet departed from the port.

In the early 1700s the English painter John Thornhill lamented on how townspeople in ports took advantage of travellers who often had to wait for the weather to calm before a ship could sail. Hellevoetsluis was one of the ports mentioned in his journal in 1711:

Gravesend, Dover, Deal and Harwich
The devil gave his daughter in marriage
And further to fulfil his will
He threw in Helvoetsluice and Brill

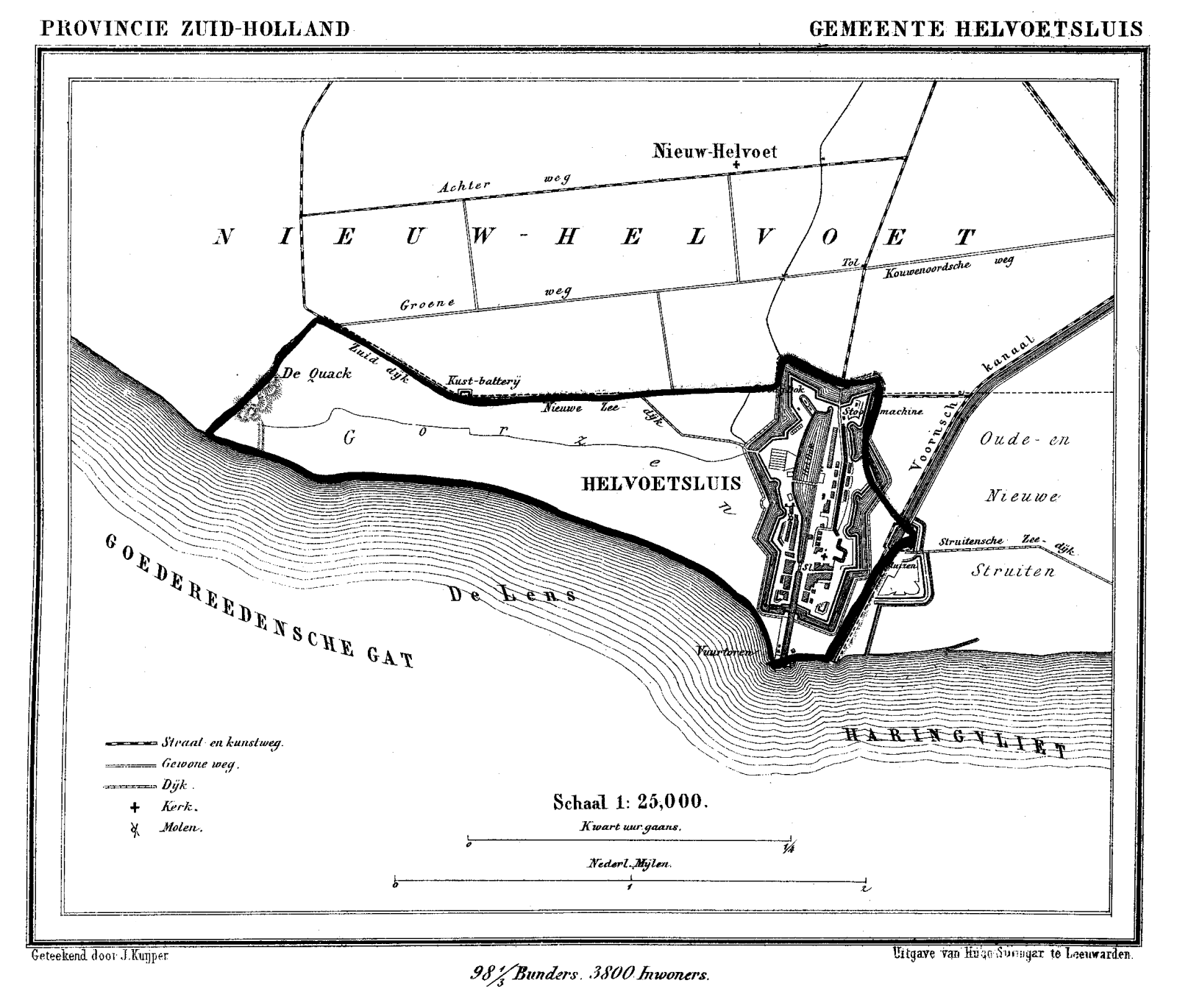
Hellevoetsluis in 1866.

The Voorne Canal (Kanaal door Voorne) was built in 1830 from Hellevoetsluis to Nieuwesluis (near Heenvliet) and made Hellevoetsluis an outport of Rotterdam. It was a period when the town grew and flourished; the shipping industry provided prosperity. Its neighbourhood Vlotbrug may have been named after a vlotbrug constructed over the canal.

In the first half of the 20th century, however, Hellevoetsluis went into decline. Ocean-going ships became too large to use the canal and the Nieuwe Waterweg was dug, making the Canal through Voorne redundant. The naval base was relocated to Den Helder in the 1930s, the Government shipyard was closed, and during World War II the Germans destroyed three-quarters of all buildings in 1944. They also used the canal as a base for Biber submarines.

After World War II Hellevoetsluis grew considerably. As a New Town, the population doubled in the 1970s. Today 43,000 inhabitants live in modern houses with abundant green areas nearby. It is home to many commuters working in Europoort or Rotterdam.

During the flood of 1953 Hellevoetsluis was inundated and after this flood, the Netherlands implemented the Deltawerken, a vast plan that put in place sea-defenses such as dams to protect vulnerable islands in the Meuse-Rhine river delta.

The town is home to several buildings from the 16th–19th centuries that are listed monuments. Among these are the Admiraliteitsgebouw (currently used as the town hall); the de Hoop windmill; the Haerlem Fort/Bastion; Droogdok Jan Blanken, a historic shipbuilding site; and the Hellevoetsluis Water Tower, designed by architect N. Biezeveld and built in 1896.

== Facilities ==
Hellevoetsluis has many shops: in addition to the various small (community) shopping centres, there is the covered shopping centre De Struytse Hoeck, which has over 120 shops and is partly built over the Canal through Voorne. Education up to secondary school level, a library, community centres, health care, and modern facilities for water sport are all available. Following the construction of the Haringvliet locks, the Haringvliet is ideal water for surfing and sailing. There are also extensive mooring facilities. Close by are the beach and the dunes at Voorne, a nature reserve.

== Tourism ==
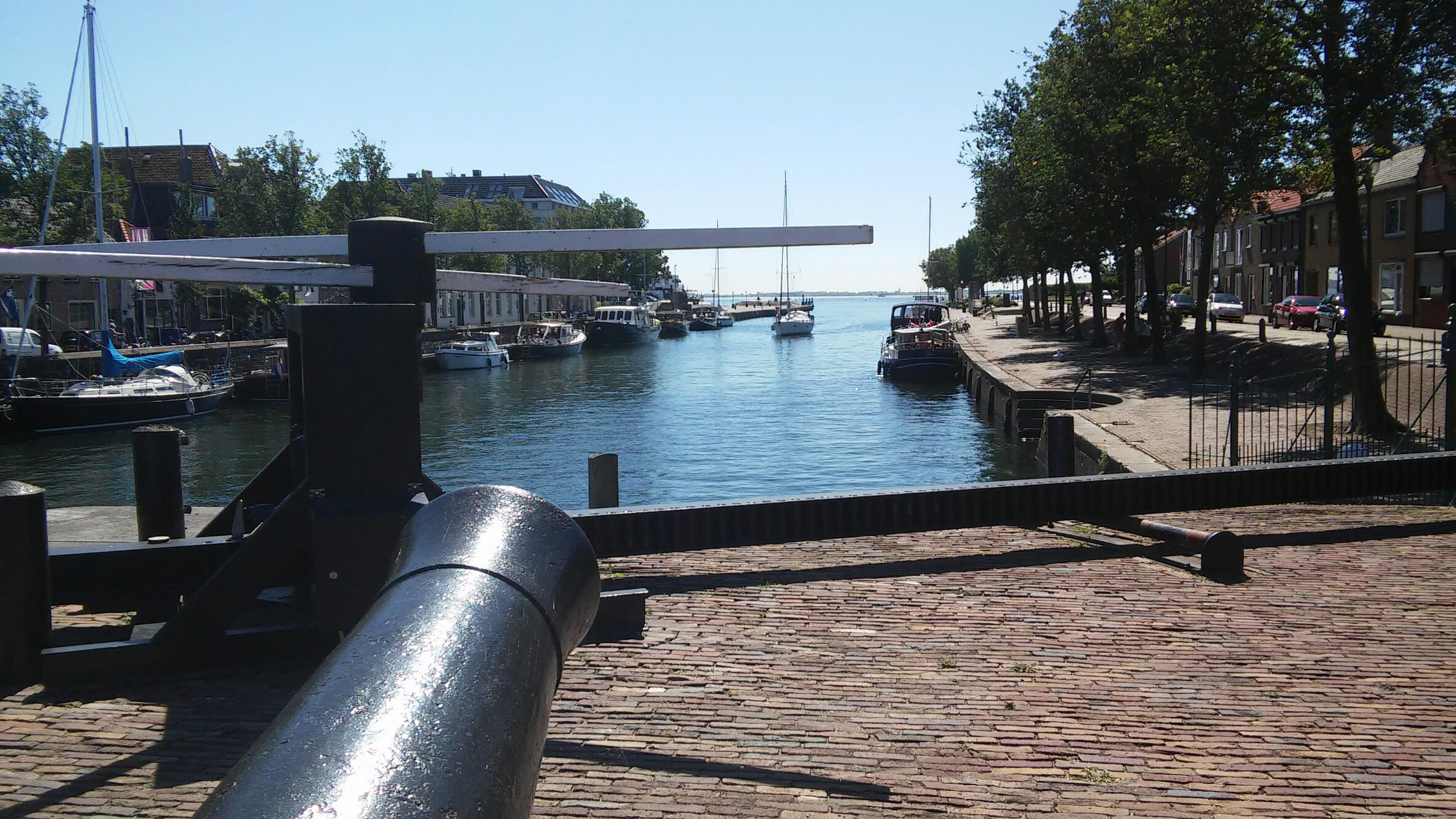

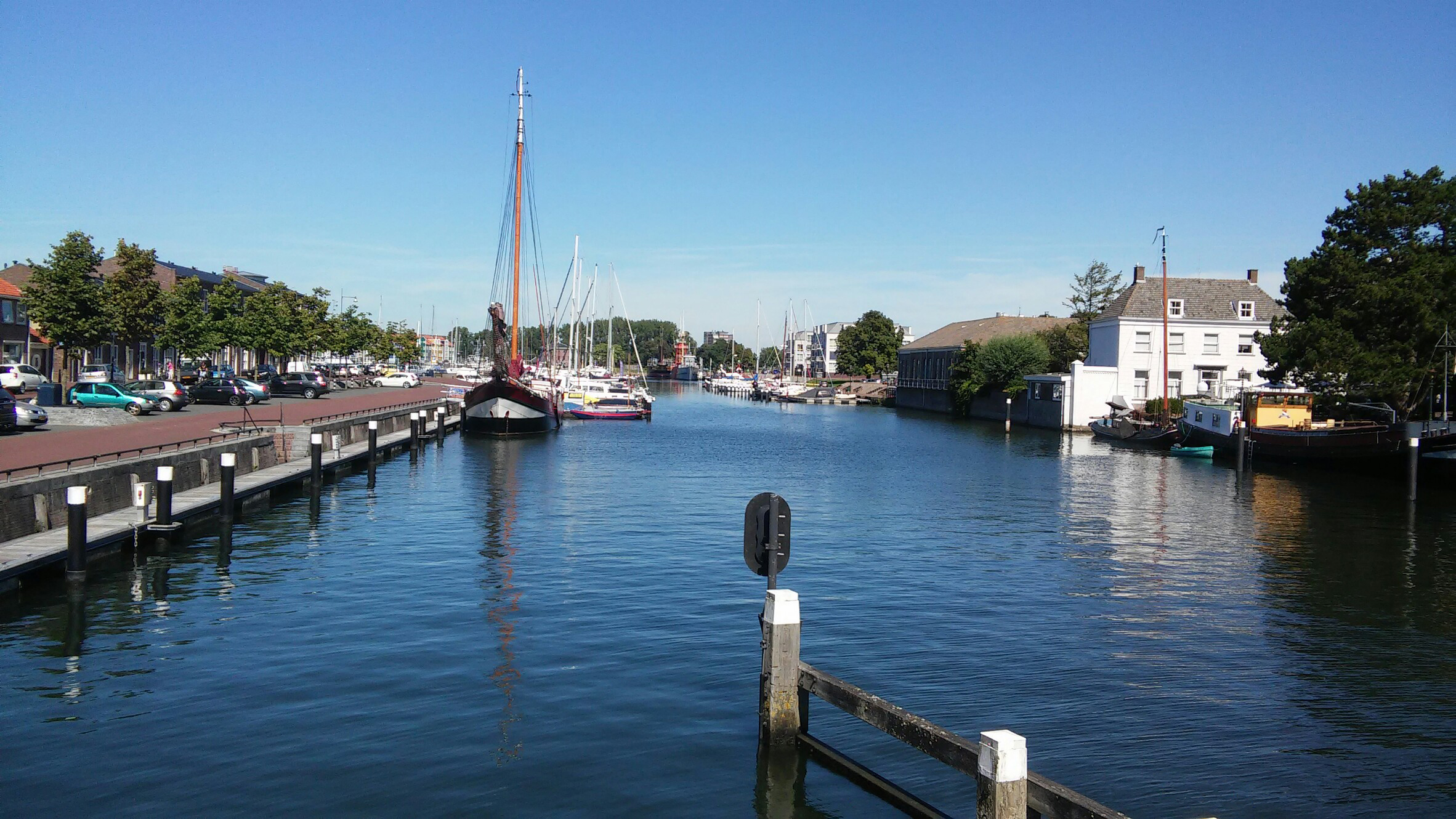

=== Water sports ===
Hellevoetsluis is one of the largest water sports centres in the country. There are 2,000 mooring places, spread over five harbours. With such a broad expanse of water as the Haringvliet and the North Sea close by, it is popular with water sports lovers and the Haringvliet is being used increasingly for national and international water sports events.

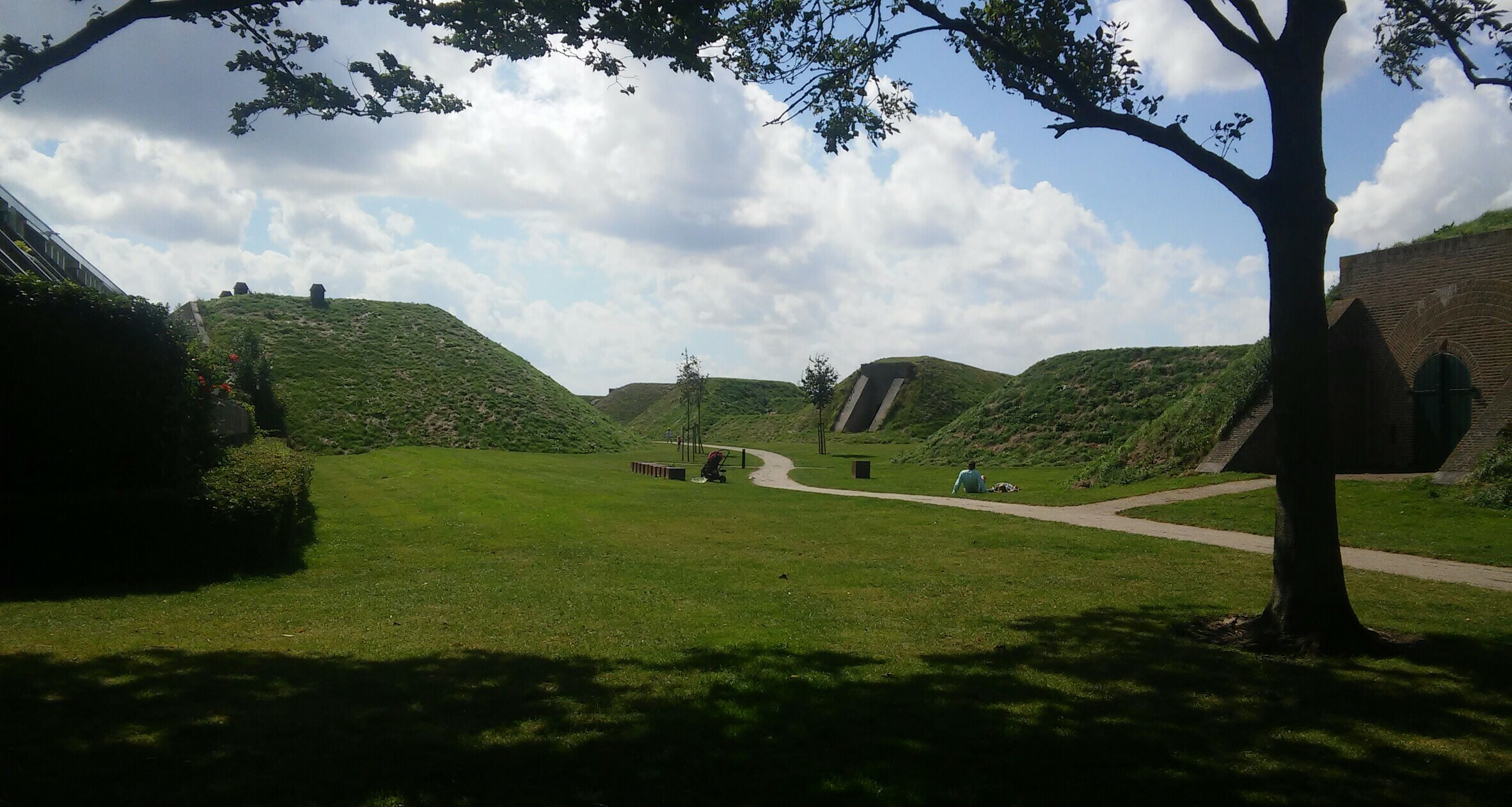

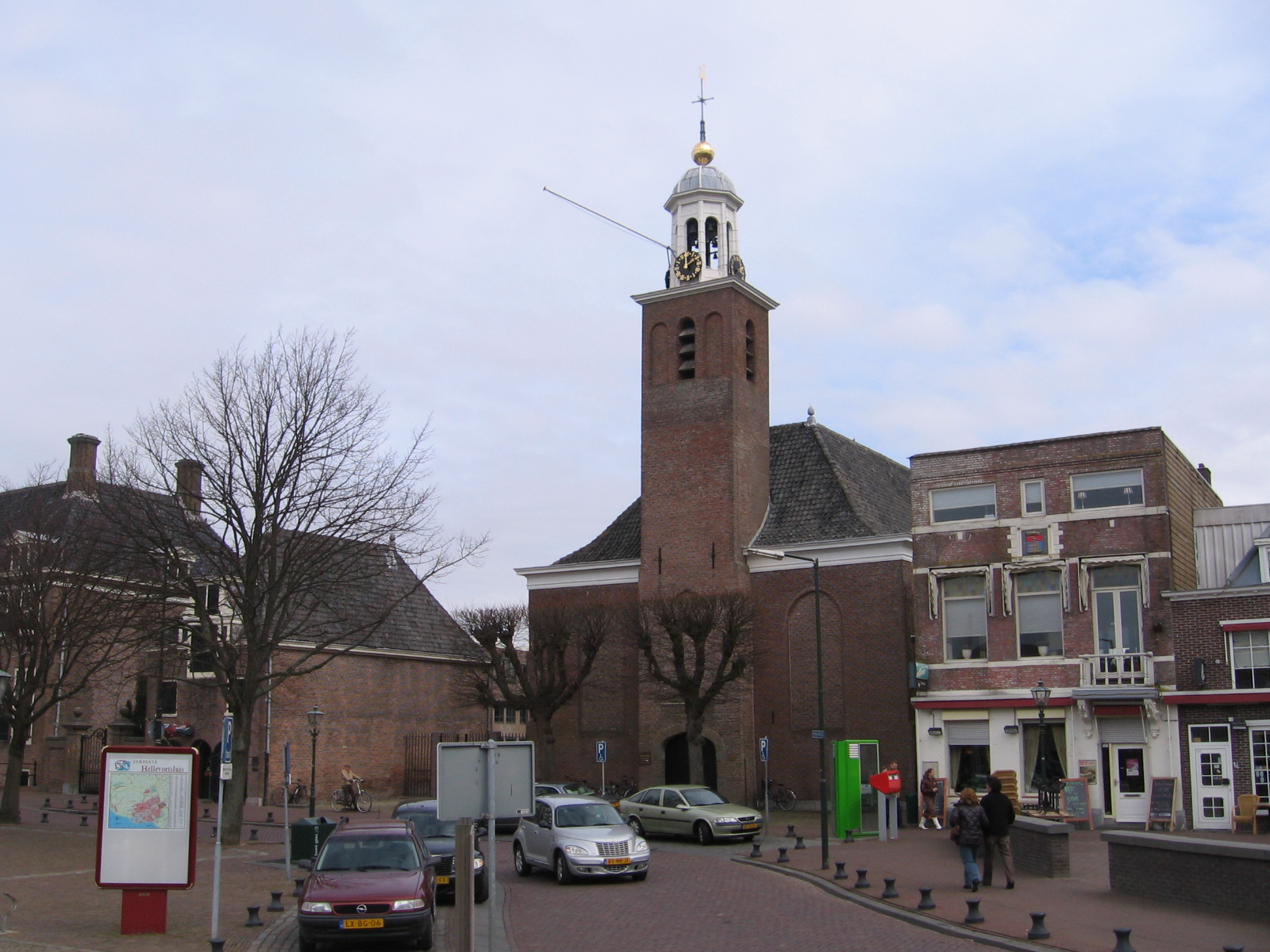

=== Entertainment ===
The old town centre, the fortress, has many terraces that look out upon the busy harbour and plenty of bars and restaurants serving international' food. There are also restaurants and bars outside the fortress. A petting zoo, a sailing school, a fitness centre, tennis courts, a sauna, etc., are nearby.

=== Events ===
In August the "Fortress Days" (Dutch: "Vestingdagen") are held. During the festivities which includes live music and a market, there are also displays of ships, aeroplane demonstrations, and a big firework display. However due to responsibility issues, the "Fortress Day" organization decided to no longer organize this event.

Every two years, the Dutch Classic Yacht Regatta is held in the harbour. A large number of classic, sharp yachts can be seen.

=== Museums ===
The town has well-preserved fortifications in the fortress. A walking tour leads to historical buildings such as the lighthouse, the Prinsehuis, Corn Mill De Hoop, and several museums. The museum Gesigt van 't Dok, situated at Oostzanddijk, contains a replica of the town, fortress, and naval shipyard as it was in 1834. This replica forms the heart of an exhibition on the development of Hellevoetsluis into a modern naval port at the beginning of the previous century.

The National Firefighting Museum, located in what used to be the Kuiperij and Grootmagazijn on Industriehaven, contains a rich collection ranging from the most primitive fire fighting equipment from centuries ago to the highly sophisticated equipment of today. Water buckets, fire hoses, water barrels, uniforms, hand- and steam engines, and many other devices that mark a point in the history of fire fighting are represented.

In the Oudheidskamer, also situated on the Industriehaven, there is a collection of items from the daily life of the past two centuries. It includes items that relate to the past of Hellevoetsluis as a naval port as well as agriculture-related articles.

Hellevoetsluis Dry Dock dates from 1806. It marks a revolutionary development in the history of shipbuilding and ship repair. The dry dock is still operational and has become a major historical and industrial/archaeological monument.

== International relations ==
=== Twin towns — Sister cities ===
Hellevoetsluis is twinned with Torbay, England because on 5 November 1688 a fleet of 463 ships with 14,000 men landed William III of Orange in Torbay having sailed from Hellevoetsluis to claim thrones of Great Britain, as part of the Glorious Revolution

== Born in Hellevoetsluis ==
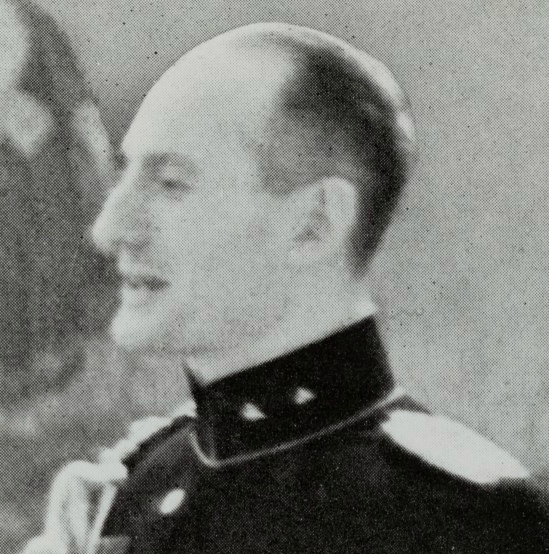
Dirk Klop, 1939

- Jan Pieter Theodoor Huydecoper (1728 in Hellevoetsluis – 1767) an administrator of the Dutch West India Company and Director-General of the Dutch Gold Coast 1764 to 1767
- Theodoor de Booy (1882 in Hellevoetsluis – 1919) a Dutch-born American archaeologist
- Jan Greshoff (1888 in Nieuw-Helvoet – 1971) a Dutch journalist, poet, and literary critic
- Dirk Klop (1906 in Nieuw-Helvoet – 1939) a Dutch Army intelligence officer, killed in the Venlo incident
- Adriaan Wesselink (1909 in Hellevoetsluis – 1995) a Dutch astronomer, specialising in variable stars
- Anthony van Kampen (1911 in Hellevoetsluis - 1991) a Dutch writer
- Ellemieke Vermolen (born 1976 in Hellevoetsluis) a Dutch actress, model and presenter
- Ronald Brouwer (born 1979 in Hellevoetsluis) a field hockey striker, team silver medallist at the 2004 Summer Olympics
- Maarten Ketting (born 1983 in Hellevoetsluis) a soccer referee
- Duncan Laurence (born 1994) a Dutch singer-songwriter, grew up in Hellevoetsluis
- Jerdy Schouten (born 1997) professional footballer
