= Annaly, U.S. Virgin Islands =

Settlement on the island of St. Croix in the United States Virgin Islands

Coordinates: 17.749695°N 64.854313°W

Annaly is a settlement on the island of St. Croix in the United States Virgin Islands. It is located in the northwest of the island, to the northeast of Frederiksted.

== History ==
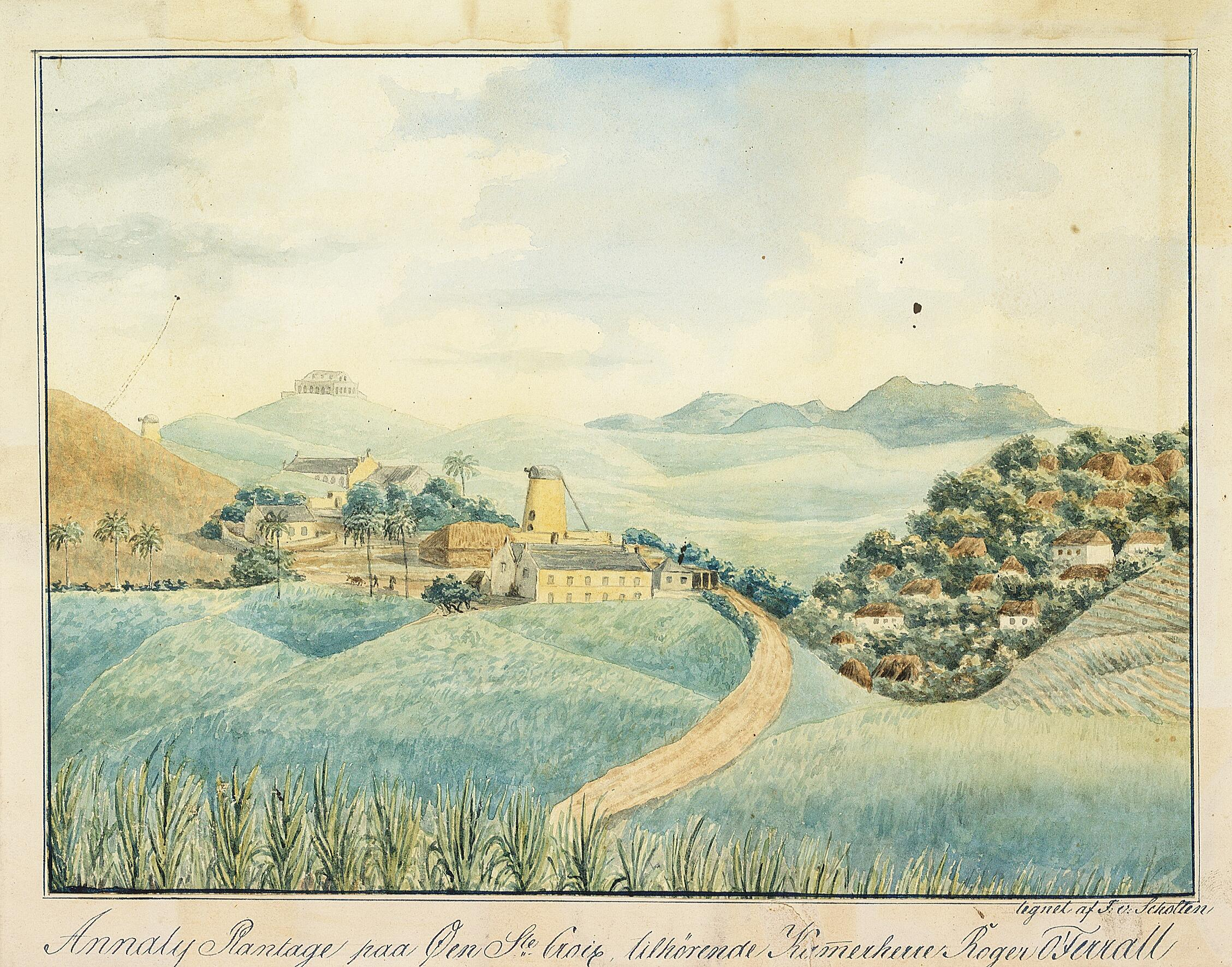
Watercolour by Frederik von Scholten.

Annaly is a former sugar plantation. It was for several generations owned by the Ferrall family during the Danish colonial era. It belonged to chamberlain (kammerherre) Roger O' Ferrall (1776-1855) in the first half of the 19th century. Frederik von Scholten a brother of Peter von Scholten, has created a watercolour of it during his ownership.

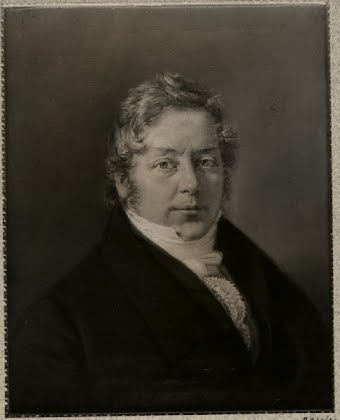
Roger Fergus Ferrall (1776-1855).

Roger Ferrall married in 1797 in Copenhagen to Sophy Krempion (1781-1829), daughter of the imperial Russian Titular Counsellor and Conference Secretary Johann Krempion and Sarah Nugent. Roger O'Ferrall was a senior customs official on the island with title of chamberlain and ritmester. He witnessed the events in Frederiksted in conjunction with the emancipation of the slaves in 1849. He was one of the men who next day rode around the plantations on the island to announce Peter con Scholten's proclamation. He was later called to testify in the case against Scholten. He owned the country house Constantia north of Copenhagen from 1811 to 1816. He is buried at Assistens Cemetery in Copenhagen.

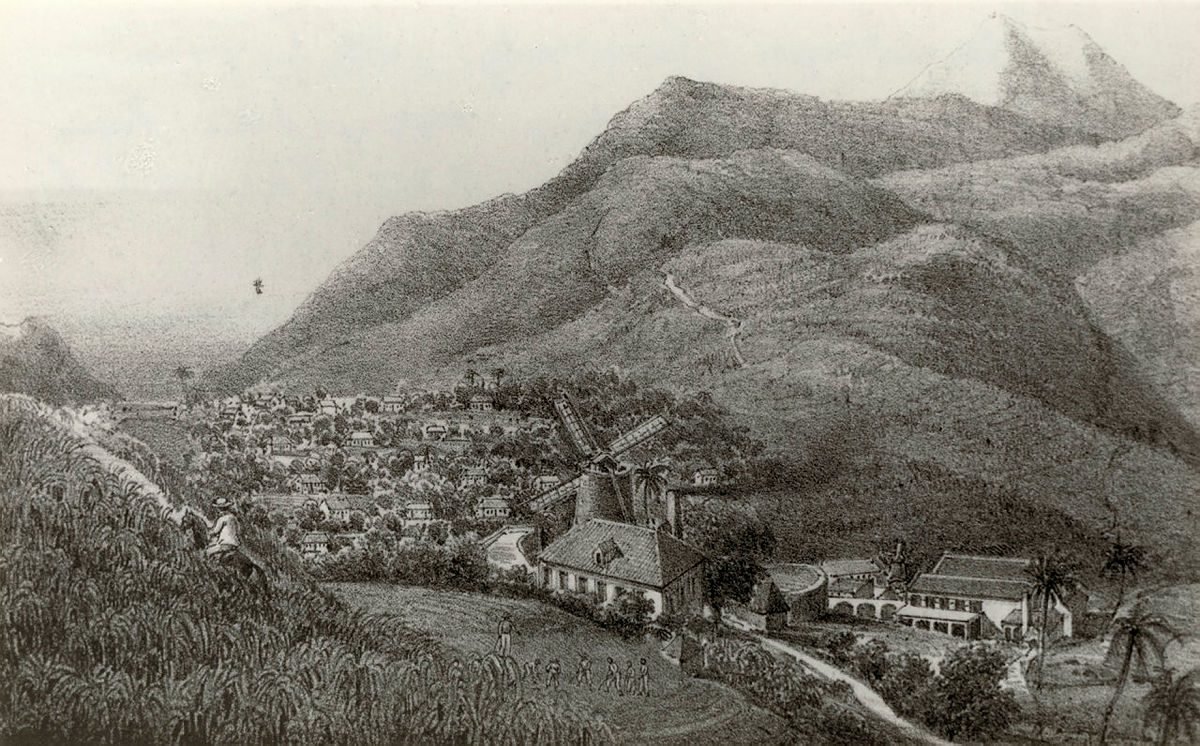
Annaly in the 1860s.

Gerraall's eldest daughter Emily Sophy Mary O'Ferral (1802-1885) married Gustav Carl Frederik, Count von Blücher-Altona (1799-1964). Their younger daughter Annie O'Ferell married Frederik Julius Christian de Castonier. Two of their daughters into the wealthy Scavenius family: Louise Sophie married the politician and owner of Gjorslev Jacob Frederik Scavenius. Her younger sister Annie Julie married the owner of JlKntholm Carl Sophus Brønnum Scavenius.
