= Theodoor de Booy =

Dutch archaeologist (1882–1919)

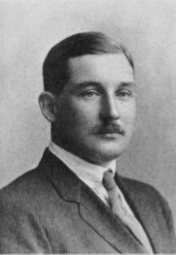
- Born: Theodoor Hendrik Nikolaas de Booy; December 5, 1882; Hellevoetsluis, Netherlands
- Died: February 18, 1919 (aged 36); Yonkers, New York
- Education: Royal Naval Institute
- Occupation: Archaeologist
- Spouse: Elizabeth Hamilton Smith (m. 1909)

Theodoor Hendrik Nikolaas de Booy (December 5, 1882 – February 18, 1919) was a Dutch-born American archaeologist.

== Biography ==
De Booy was born as son of a vice admiral in Hellevoetsluis, Netherlands. He was educated at the Royal Naval Institute. At the age of 23, he migrated to the United States where he married Elizabeth Hamilton Smith on March 29, 1909.They had two children.

In 1916 he became an American citizen. In 1911 he went to the Bahamas with his wife. During their archaeological fieldwork in the caves and middens they made remarkable discoveries (e.g. a paddle or pottery) from the Pre-Columbian culture of the Lucayan. In the following years he worked for the Heye Museum in New York City. His fieldwork in the Caribbean and in Venezuela made him a prolific expert for the history of the Pre-Columbian Arawak culture.

He died from influenza in his home in Yonkers, New York, on February 18, 1919.

Alexander Wetmore named the extinct Antillean cave rail (Nesotrochis debooyi) after de Booy.

== Selected works ==
- 1913: Lucayan Artifacts from the Bahamas
- 1915: Pottery from Certain Caves in Eastern Santo Domingo, West Indies
- 1915: Certain West-Indian Superstitions Pertaining to Celts
- 1916: Notes on the Archaeology of Margarita Island, Venezuela
- 1918: Certain Archaeological Investigations in Trinidad, British West Indies
- 1918: The Virgin Islands Our New Possessions and the British Islands
- 1919: Indian Notes and Monographs Volume 1, No. 2: Santo Domingo Kitchen-Midden and Burial Ground
- 1920: Indian Notes and Monographs Vol. X, No. 3: An Illinois Quilled Necklace
- 1926: Onder de Motilone's van de Sierre de Perija (Venezuela)
