= Reginald H. Fuller =

English-American Anglican priest and theologian (1915–2007)

The Reverend Reginald H. Fuller
- Born: Reginald Horace Fuller; 24 March 1915; Horsham, England
- Died: 4 April 2007 (aged 92); Richmond, Virginia, US
- Spouse: Ilse Barda Fuller (m. 1942)

Ecclesiastical career
- Religion: Christianity (Anglican)
- Church: Church of England; Episcopal Church (United States)
- Ordained: 1940 (deacon); 1941 (priest)

Academic background
- Education: Peterhouse, Cambridge; Queen's College, Birmingham
- Influences: Ferdinand Hahn

Academic work
- Discipline: Biblical studies; theology
- Sub-discipline: Christology; New Testament studies
- School or tradition: Neo-orthodoxy
- Institutions: Queen's College, Birmingham; St David's College; Seabury-Western Theological Seminary; Union Theological Seminary; Virginia Theological Seminary

Reginald Horace Fuller (24 March 1915 – 4 April 2007) was an English-American biblical scholar, ecumenist, and Anglican priest. His works are recognized for their consequential analysis of New Testament Christology. One aspect of his work is on the relation of Jesus to the early church and the church today. For this, his analysis, which uses the historical-critical method, has been described as neo-orthodox.

== Life events ==
Reginald Fuller was born on 24 March 1915. An obituary from the University of Wales Trinity Saint David noted that "Fuller was the son of Horace Fuller, an agricultural engineer, and his wife Cora Lottie née Heath. He came from Horsham in West Sussex, where he attended Collyer’s School. He was a choir boy in his local parish church between the ages of nine and fifteen."

Fuller subsequently attended Peterhouse, Cambridge, graduating with first-class honours in the Classical Tripos (Part I) and Theological Tripos (Part II) in 1937. He studied at the University of Tübingen, Germany, from 1938 to 1939, and then prepared for ministry in the Church of England at the Queen's College, Birmingham from 1939 to 1940. He was ordained in the Church of England as a deacon in 1940 and as a priest in 1941. He met Ilse Barda in 1940 at a wedding. They married in 1942. Fuller was a curate in England from 1940 to 1950 and lectured in theology at the Queen's College, 1946–1950. He was professor of theology and Hebrew at St David's College, Lampeter, Wales (1950–1955). He also assisted in raising three daughters.

Fuller became a US resident in 1955. He was professor of New Testament at Seabury-Western Theological Seminary, Evanston, Ill., languages and literature (1955–1966), Union Theological Seminary and Columbia (adj.), NYC (1966–1972), and Virginia Theological Seminary, Alexandria (1972–1985; adj., 1994–2002). Fuller was also visiting professor at nine other seminaries or colleges in the United States, Canada, and Australia: University of the South, Sewanee, Tenn. (1960, ..., 1988, 7 terms), Graduate Theological Union, Berkeley, Ca. (1975), College of Emmanuel and St. Chad, Saskatoon, Sask., Canada (1978), Union Theological Seminary, Richmond, Va. (1985), Episcopal Theological Seminary of the Southwest, Austin, Tx. (1986), Nashotah House, Wis. (1986, ..., 2004, 7 terms), St. Mark's College of Ministry, Canberra, Australia (1987), and Wesley Theological Seminary, Washington, DC (1990).

Fuller was a member of World Council of Churches study commissions (1957–1961), Episcopal–Lutheran Conversations (1969–1972, 1977–1980), Anglican–Lutheran Conversations (1970–1972), and Lutheran–Catholic (US) Dialogue Task Force (1971–1973), and the New Revised Standard Version Bible Translation Committee (1981–2006).

Fuller authored some twenty books and over 100 journal articles or book chapters. He also translated such works as Bonhoeffer's The Cost of Discipleship (1948) and Letters and Papers from Prison (1953), Jeremias's Unknown Sayings of Jesus (1957), Bultmann's Kerygma and Myth, 2 v. (1953 & 1962) and Primitive Christianity (1956), Schweitzer's Reverence for Life (with Ilse Fuller) (1969), and Bornkamm's The New Testament: A Guide to Its Writings (1973).

== Honours ==
Fuller was a fellow of the American Association of Theological Schools, 1961–1962. He was president of Studiorum Novi Testamenti Societas, 1983-84 He was recipient of the first annual Ecumenism Award from the Washington Theological Consortium (2001) and of honorary degrees from among others General Theological Seminary (STD), Philadelphia Divinity School (STD), and Seabury-Western Theological Seminary (DD).

Fuller became Professor Emeritus at Virginia Theological Seminary in 1985.

In 1990, his former students presented a festschrift in his honour, titled Christ and His Communities: Essays in Honor of Reginald H. Fuller.

Fuller became an American citizen in 1995. He was an honorary canon of Cathedral Church of St. Paul in Burlington, Vermont, and Priest in Residence at Emmanuel Church at Brook Hill, Richmond, Va.

Fuller was survived by his wife Ilse Barda Fuller, his daughters, Caroline Sloat and Sally Fuller, four grandchildren; and five great-grandsons. Ilse Fuller was honored for her work in transcribing his notes in preparation for publication. For that work, Nashotah House honored her with an honorary Doctor of Humane Letters in 2007. Fuller had been scheduled to deliver the commencement address before his death.

The New York Times obituary recorded Fuller's belief that the Bible must be proclaimed every Sunday. It closed by noting that, "On March 25, the day he suffered the fall that eventually led to his death, he taught a Sunday school class on the Resurrection."

== The Foundations of New Testament Christology ==
Reginald H. Fuller's treatise, The Foundations of New Testament Christology (1965), illustrates aspects of his scholarly publications. The book defines key terms, states assumptions, describes the method used, and develops implications in cumulative fashion. Thus, 'Christology' (the doctrine of Jesus Christ's person) refers to a response to a particular history, not the action of God in Jesus as such nor the history itself. Analysis of New Testament Christology begins with the disciples' belief in the resurrection. It is concerned with "what can be known of the words and works of Jesus" and how these were interpreted. 'Foundations of New Testament Christology' is foundational in referring to presuppositions of NT writers rather than to the theology of their finished product (pp. 15–17). The book considers the response of the early church as to conceptual tools available in successive environments of Palestinian Judaism, Hellenistic Judaism, and the Graeco-Roman gentile world. "What can be known" of the historical Jesus and the early church's mission depends on critical methods and tests applied to documents from the gentile mission. Such methods and tests distinguish the knowledge of early writers about Jesus, their own theology, and other traditions to which they responded (pp. 17–20). The book makes explicit which elements of sources are accepted as going back to each stratum of the early church. It accepts assignment of a tradition to a specific stratum with:

- elaboration in case of wide acceptance
- a summary of the argument in case wide acceptance is lacking
- elaboration in case a common assignment is rejected or a new assignment is proposed (p. 21).

With the emergence of a post-Bultmann school of "historical-traditio criticism", the concern of the book is "to establish a continuity of the historical Jesus and the christological kerygma of the post-resurrection church." The real continuity, Fuller felt, "was obscured, if not actually denied, by Bultmann's own work", to the disadvantage of the church's proclamation (p. 11).

The book concludes that the christological foundations of the early church (as recoverable from the New Testament and formulations of Church Fathers) "are also the foundations of Christology today" (p. 257).

== Selected publications ==
=== Books ===
- Fuller, Reginald H.; Hanson, Richard P. C. (1948). The Church of Rome: A Dissuasive. London: SCM Press. OCLC 560315647. - 1960, 2nd ed.
- ——— (1954). The Mission and Achievement of Jesus: An Examination of the Presuppositions of New Testament Theology. Studies in Biblical theology. Vol. 12. London: SCM Press. OCLC 2560151.
- ———; Wright, G. Ernest (1957). The Book of the Acts of God: Christian Scholarship Interprets the Bible. Christian faith series. Garden City, NY: Doubleday. OCLC 530493.
- Fuller, Reginald H. (1962). The New Testament in Current Study. Scribner studies in biblical interpretation. New York: Scribners. OCLC 8003601.
- ——— (1963). Interpreting the Miracles. Philadelphia, PA: Westminster. ISBN 978-0-334-00681-7. OCLC 383436.
- ______ (1964). The New Testament in Current Study. SCM Press. Reviewed by Burton H. Throckmorton Jr. (1964). [Review untitled] "The New Testament in Current Study by Reginald H. Fuller," The Journal of Religion 44(1}, p. 79.
- ——— (1965). The Foundations of New Testament Christology. New York: Scribners. ISBN 9780684155326. OCLC 383751.
- ——— (1966). A Critical Introduction to the New Testament. Studies in Theology series. Vol. 55. London: G. Duckworth. OCLC 339842.
- ——— (1971). The Formation of the Resurrection Narratives. London: Macmillan. OCLC 313093002.
- ———; Wuellner, Wilhelm H. (1976). Longer Mark: forgery, interpolation, or old tradition?. Colloquy (Center for Hermeneutical Studies in Hellenistic and Modern Culture), December 7, 1975. Vol. 18. Berkeley, CA: Center for Hermeneutical Studies. ISBN 9780892420179. OCLC 854089196.
- ———; Perkins, Pheme (1983). Who Is This Christ?: Gospel Christology and Contemporary Faith. Philadelphia, PA: Fortress Press. ISBN 9780800617066. OCLC 8846197.
- ——— (1984). Preaching the New Lectionary: The Word of God for the Church of Today. Collegeville, MN: Liturgical Press. ISBN 9780814608470. OCLC 1161560.
- ——— (1990). He That Cometh: The Birth of Jesus in the New Testament. Harrisburg, PA: Morehouse Publisher. ISBN 9780819215444. OCLC 21677534.
- ——— (1994). Christ and Christianity: Studies in the Formation of Christology. Valley Forge, PA: Trinity Press International. ISBN 9781563380761. OCLC 30359043.
- ——— (1974). Preaching the Lectionary: The Word of God for the Church Today. Collegeville, MN: Liturgical Press. ISBN 9780814613511. OCLC 11114298.
- ———; Westberg, Daniel (1984). Preaching the Lectionary: The Word of God for the Church Today (2nd ed.). Collegeville, MN: Liturgical Press. ISBN 9780814613511. OCLC 11114298.
- ———; Westberg, Daniel (2006). Preaching the Lectionary: The Word of God for the Church Today (3rd ed.). Collegeville, MN: Liturgical Press. ISBN 9780814613511. OCLC 11114298.

=== Chapters or entries ===
- ——— (1993). "New Testament (under Biblical Theology)". In Metzger, Bruce M.; Coogan, Michael D. (eds.). The Oxford Companion to the Bible. New York: Oxford University Press. pp. 87–91. ISBN 9780195046458. OCLC 802755374.
- ——— (1993). "Jesus Christ". In Metzger, Bruce M.; Coogan, Michael D. (eds.). The Oxford Companion to the Bible. New York: Oxford University Press. pp. 356–66. ISBN 9780195046458. OCLC 802755374.
- ——— (1993). "Resurrection of Christ". In Metzger, Bruce M.; Coogan, Michael D. (eds.). The Oxford Companion to the Bible. New York: Oxford University Press. pp. 647–49. ISBN 9780195046458. OCLC 802755374.
- ——— (1988). "Scripture". In Sykes, Stephen; Booty, John E. (eds.). The Study of Anglicanism. Philadelphia, PA: SPCK/Fortress Press. pp. 86–100. ISBN 9780800620875. OCLC 17353342.
- ——— (1996). "Christology". In Bram, Leon L. (ed.). Funk & Wagnalls New Encyclopedia. New York: Funk & Wagnalls. ISBN 9780834301030. OCLC 34513534.
- ——— (2008). "Christology". Microsoft Encarta Online Encyclopedia.

=== Journal articles ===
- ——— (1964). "Untitled review (of Historical Tradition in the Fourth Gospel by C. H. Dodd)". Journal of Bible and Religion. 32 (3): 270–271.
- ——— (1967). "Review of Rediscovering the Teaching of Jesus by Norman Perrin". Theology Today. 24 (3): 412–14. doi:10.1177/004057366702400325. S2CID 170738002.
- ——— (1978). "The Conception/Birth of Jesus as a Christological Moment". Journal for the Study of the New Testament. 1 (1): 37–52. doi:10.1177/0142064X7800100105. S2CID 170233233.

== See also ==
- The Myth of God Incarnate
