= Life Together =

Book by the German theologian Dietrich Bonhoeffer

- Author: Dietrich Bonhoeffer
- Original title: Gemeinsames Leben
- Translator: John W. Doberstein
- Language: German
- Subject: Christian community
- Publisher: Christian Kaiser Verlag
- Publication date: 1939
- Publication place: Germany
- English publication date: 1954
- Media type: Print (hardcover and softcover)

Life Together (German: Gemeinsames Leben) is a book by the German Protestant theologian Dietrich Bonhoeffer, written while he taught at an underground seminary. Other works of Bonhoeffer include The Cost of Discipleship and a compilation of letters he wrote while imprisoned by the Third Reich.

== Life Together and Bonhoeffer ==
Bonhoeffer during the World Wars, preached to the audience about love and living in harmony. He believed that God bestows human solidarity because people are in fact their "brother's keeper", paraphrasing Genesis 4:9. In his writing, he stated, "Without Christ there is discord between God and man and between man and man […] Christ opened up the way to God and to our brother". He opens with the quote from Psalms 133:1: "Behold how good and how pleasant it is for brethren to dwell together in unity." He then gives several examples of times when we are to come together through praise. He writes that community is not something to be taken for granted. He detailed the necessity of the church functioning as a living and vibrant organism, what he called a "community of love." Because this gave him an inside view of the needs of the Body of Christ, he was able to articulate what he saw as the gap in reality between what the Church should look like according to the Book of Acts and what the Church actually looked like before the eyes of the world. He found it hard to accept that most pastors considered the way the Nazis treated the Jews to be acceptable, which they expressed through inaction. He struggled with the moral dilemma of obeying the authorities or following the higher laws of Christ.

== The Centrality of Christ ==
Throughout Life Together, Bonhoeffer defines the Church as the meeting grounds of Christianity. He expounds on this idea by asking what the Church should do when it meets and why that is important. Bonhoeffer concludes that we are to live as the body of the Church, exercising our gifts to assist the body of believers and then working through that body to reach out to those who still have not made a commitment to the Christian cause. Christians are established in unity by the saving work of Jesus Christ, and it matters not if they agree on the words to sing or what tempo to praise their Creator. He argues what is important is that they are lifting their voices up in unison.

== Church as divine reality ==
Bonhoeffer strongly felt that there is an empirical experience that results from meeting with others to become intimate before Christ. He suggests that Christians should confess their sins to one another. Earlier, in his habilitation thesis published as Act and Being, he states that the church community, not some philosophical or theological system of thought, "is God's final revelation [of his divine self] as 'Christ existing in community [Gemeinde]'". In other words, Christians should not wait for a revelation from God before they do something, but because they are continuously and prayerfully considering what is right, it is possible that God has already revealed His will to them and they need to summon up the courage to take the appropriate actions.

== Church as a community of love ==
A community of love focuses its attention on Jesus and then expects everything else to fall into place. When the people of God come together to share their lives openly and freely, accepting each other with unconditional positive regard, there is a sort of social-spiritual "chemistry" that emerges, and those who come together experience a delightful cohesion and sense of belonging. Bonhoeffer's convictions fit with the Biblical teachings that every human is related in a family relationship. One man is another man's brother, and one woman is another woman's sister. We must endure one another's burdens and help direct others to a more religious life. Bonhoeffer writes that when a person strays from Christianity, it is the problem of the entire group - and their responsibility - to get him on the right track again. In the offset of his work he expresses his conviction that the Church is not a desire, nor the product of desire, nor a wish, a dream, or visionary hope. If the Church were a result of man's efforts, its failure would cause the founder to accuse the other members, God, and finally himself. However, God has created the church in Jesus Christ, and thankfulness is the only attitude: thankfulness for forgiveness, daily provisions, and fellowship. Thankfulness is the key to greater spiritual resources. Without thankfulness for the daily gifts God has given, the greater gifts of God will not come our way. Especially in the case of pastors, thankfulness is important. A pastor has no right to accuse his congregation before God. Rather, let him make intercession and give thanks for his congregation. If the Church is not an ideal, it is also not a human reality. As a divine reality it is also a spiritual entity with its basis in Jesus Christ, whereas the basis of human realities is desire. In the Church, there is the community of those called by Christ. The fellowship of the human community is composed of devout souls and works along the lines of the magnetic persuasion of a leader. The fellowship of Christ is ruled by God's word. In one community Holy Spirit rules; in the other, psychological techniques.

Bonhoeffer's central idea is that the Church, as the fellowship of Christ, centers on Christ rather than being a mere association of people with a common purpose. Human love and actions are related to a desire for human community. Christian love, spiritual love, comes from Christ and goes out to the other person, not directly, but through Christ. For Bonhoeffer, Christ "stands between me and others". This means that disciplining other people is through Christ, not directly. Direct personal influence may amount to coercion or be an impure influence in another's life. Rather, the most direct way to another is found in prayer to Christ, whose influence is greater.

The community will continue to exist only as it learns to distinguish spiritual love from humans, the spiritual community from the human ideal.

"Life together under the Word will remain sound and healthy only where it does not form itself into a movement, an order, a society, a collegium pietatis, but rather where it understands itself as being a part of the one, holy, catholic, Christian Church where it shares actively and passively in the sufferings and struggles and promise of the whole church."

The unity of the community is in Christ, "through him alone do we have access to one another, joy in one another, and fellowship with one another."
