= Von guten Mächten =

Poem and hymn

- Christian poem and hymn
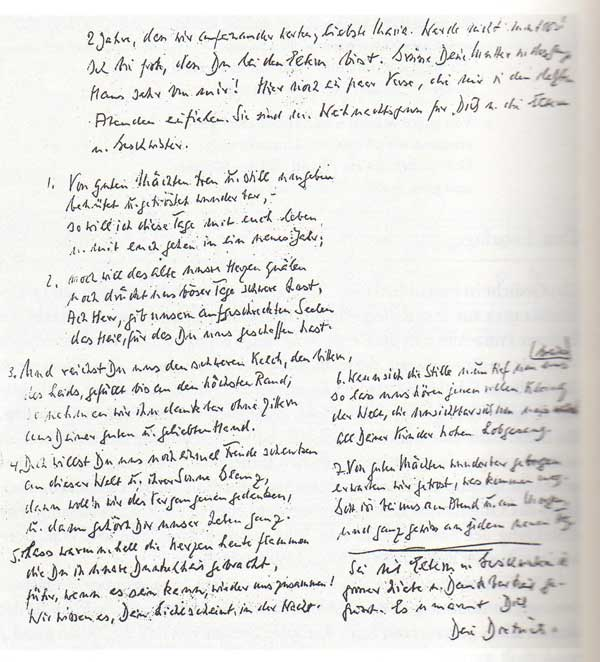
- Bonhoeffer's autograph
- Written: 1944
- Text: by Dietrich Bonhoeffer
- Language: German
- Melody: by Otto Abel; Joseph Gelineau; Kurt Grahl; Siegfried Fietz

"Von guten Mächten" (By good forces) is a Christian poem written by Dietrich Bonhoeffer in 1944 while imprisoned in the basement prison of the Reich Security Main Office because of his resistance to the Nazis. It is his last theological text before he was executed on 9 April 1945. It became a frequently sung hymn, with different melodies, which has appeared in current German hymnals. The incipit is: "Von guten Mächten treu und still umgeben", which can be translated literally as: "By good forces devotedly and quietly surrounded", or, in a more poetic, singable, widely used version: "By loving forces silently surrounded, ...". The seventh and last stanza "Von guten Mächten wunderbar geborgen" respectively "By loving forces wonderfully sheltered" is used as a refrain in this popular rendition.

== History ==
Bonhoeffer was arrested as a prominent opponent of the Nazi regime on 5 April 1943, and was kept at different prisons. His writings in prison showed a new dimension in his theology. From mid-1944, around the time of the 20 July plot, he began to also write poems.

He was transferred to the Reich Security Main Office in Berlin on 8 October 1944. From there he wrote on 19 December 1944 to his betrothed Maria von Wedemeyer, adding the poem with the comments "ein paar Verse, die mir in den letzten Abenden einfielen" (a few verses that occurred to me the last evenings) and "als ein Weihnachtsgruß für Dich und die Eltern und Geschwister" (as a Christmas greeting for you and the parents and siblings). The poem refers both to his own situation and that of his family: he had to face possible execution, his brother Klaus and his brothers-in-law Hans von Dohnanyi and Rüdiger Schleicher were in prison, his brother Walter had died as a soldier, and his twin sister Sabine had left the country with her Jewish husband Gerhard Leibholz.

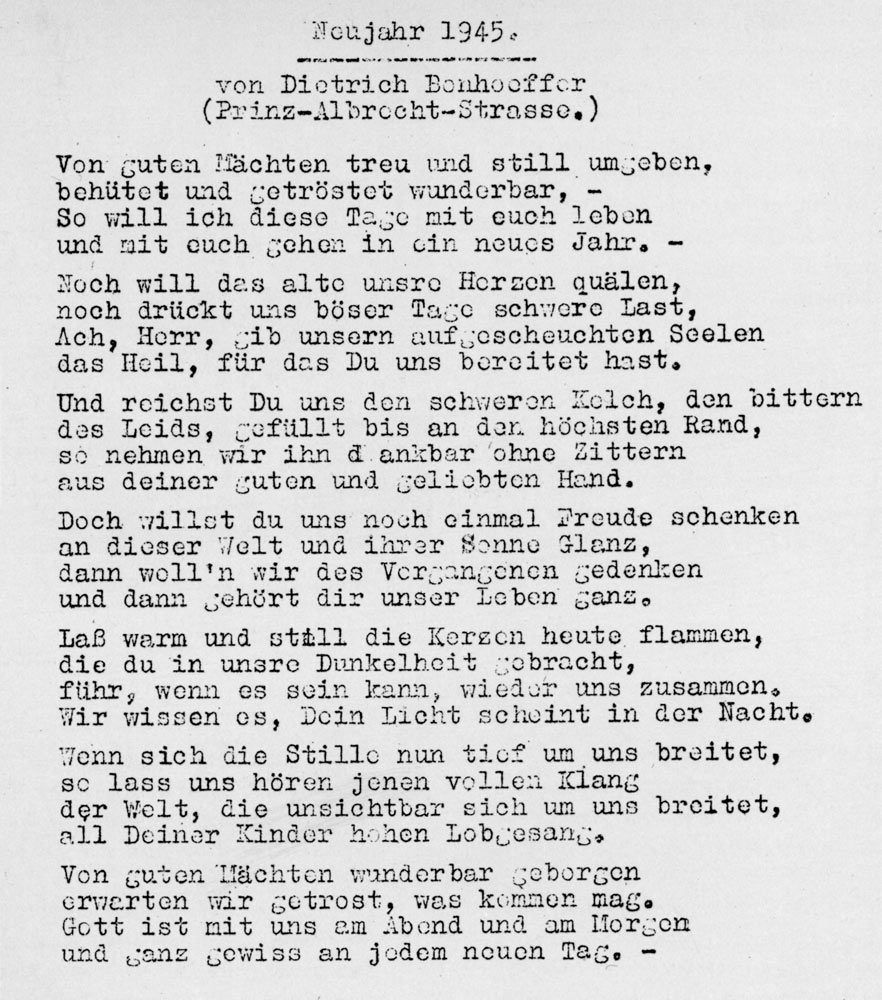
Typed version of 1945, which was believed to be authentic until 1988

Bonhoeffer's letters to Maria were not intended to be published. She made a copy for relatives for Christmas 1944. A derived typed copy appeared first in Geneva in 1945 in the ecumenical Gedenkschrift (memorial writing) Dietrich Bonhoeffer: Das Zeugnis eines Boten. This version was believed to be authentic when Eberhard Bethge included it in his collection of Bonhoeffer's letters, Widerstand und Ergebung ('Resistance and Resignation'), in 1951. It differs from the original in four instances and served as the basis for hymn versions. When the original letter was published in 1988, it was printed then in the critical edition, Dietrich Bonhoeffer Werke, vol. 8 (1998). The Protestant hymnal Evangelisches Gesangbuch of 1993 used the original text, followed by other hymnals and song books.

== Form and text ==
The poem is in seven even stanzas, different from Bonhoeffer's other poetic texts from the period, such as "Glück und Unglück", "Wer bin ich?", "Der Freund", "Vergangenheit". The seven stanzas are numbered as in a hymnal, possibly to clarify their order.

The text of the Evangelisches Gesangbuch follows Bonhoeffer's original:

| German original | English translation |
| 1. Von guten Mächten treu und still umgeben, behütet und getröstet wunderbar, so will ich diese Tage mit euch leben und mit euch gehen in ein neues Jahr. | By good forces devotedly and quietly surrounded, wonderfully protected and solaced, thus I want to live with you these days and head with you into a new year. |
| 2. Noch will das alte unsre Herzen quälen, noch drückt uns böser Tage schwere Last. Ach Herr, gib unsern aufgeschreckten Seelen das Heil, für das du uns geschaffen hast. | Yet the old wants to torment our hearts, yet the burden of evil days oppresses us. Oh Lord, give our scared up souls the salvation, for which Thou created us. |
| 3. Und reichst du uns den schweren Kelch, den bittern; des Leids, gefüllt bis an den höchsten Rand, so nehmen wir ihn dankbar ohne Zittern aus deiner guten und geliebten Hand. | And when Thou extend to us the heavy chalice, the bitter one of suffering, filled to the very tallest brim, so we accept it grateful without shaking from Thy good and beloved hand. |
| 4. Doch willst du uns noch einmal Freude schenken; an dieser Welt und ihrer Sonne Glanz, dann wolln wir des Vergangenen gedenken, und dann gehört dir unser Leben ganz. | But if Thou want to gift us enjoyment once more of this world and its sun's gleam, then we want to think of that which has passed, and then our life belongs to Thee fully. |
| 5. Laß warm und hell die Kerzen heute flammen, die du in unsre Dunkelheit gebracht, führ, wenn es sein kann, wieder uns zusammen. Wir wissen es, dein Licht scheint in der Nacht. | Let flame warmly and brightly today the candles, which Thou hast brought into our darkness, lead, if it is possible, us back together. We know it – Thy light shines during the night. |
| 6. Wenn sich die Stille nun tief um uns breitet, so laß uns hören jenen vollen Klang der Welt, die unsichtbar sich um uns weitet, all deiner Kinder hohen Lobgesang. | When the silence thus engulfs us, so let us hear that vibrant sound of the world, which invisibly enshrouds us, all Thy children's high lauding hymns. |
| 7. Von guten Mächten wunderbar geborgen; erwarten wir getrost, was kommen mag. Gott ist bei uns am Abend und am Morgen und ganz gewiß an jedem neuen Tag. | By good forces wonderfully sheltered we await confidently, what may come. God is next to us in the evening and the morning, and most assuredly on every new day. |

== Melodies ==
The meter of the poem does not match any hymn tune of the time. The personal beginning is not well suited to singing as a congregation. The earliest setting to music by Otto Abel in 1959 used originally only the final stanza. His melody was used for the Evangelisches Gesangbuch as EG 65, in the section Zur Jahreswende, and in the Mennonitisches Gesangbuch as MG 272 in the section Durch das Jahr – Jahreswende und Epiphanias.

The text has been set to music more than 70 times, including a 1971 version by Joseph Gelineau, and a setting by Kurt Grahl in 1976. The most popular melody was written by Siegfried Fietz in 1970. In the style of Neues Geistliches Lied, he used the last stanza as a refrain, with a different melody in lower range for the verses. It appears in several regional parts of the Evangelischen Gesangbuch, and in regional parts of the Catholic hymnal Gotteslob, while the main section has the melody by Kurt Grahl as GL 430.

== Literature ==
- Jürgen Henkys: Von guten Mächten treu und still umgeben. In: Hansjakob Becker u. a.: Geistliches Wunderhorn. C. H. Beck, München 2001, ISBN 3-406-48094-2, pp 452–461.
