= Otto Abel =

German organist and cantor

Otto Abel (October 24, 1905 – September 21, 1977) was a German organist, cantor, composer, editor, and Protestant Landeskirchenmusikdirektor.

== Life ==
Born in Berlin, from 1930 to 1970, Abel was Kantor and organist at the Immanuelkirche in Berlin-Prenzlauer Berg. From 1959, he also served as the Regional Church Music Director for the Eastern Region of the Evangelical Church in Berlin, Brandenburg, and Silesian Upper Lusatia. From 1956 onwards, he was the Church Music Editor at the Evangelische Verlagsanstalt in East Berlin.

Abel composed several church pieces for the organ.

He died on a journey in Tettnang, Baden-Württemberg.

== Compositions ==
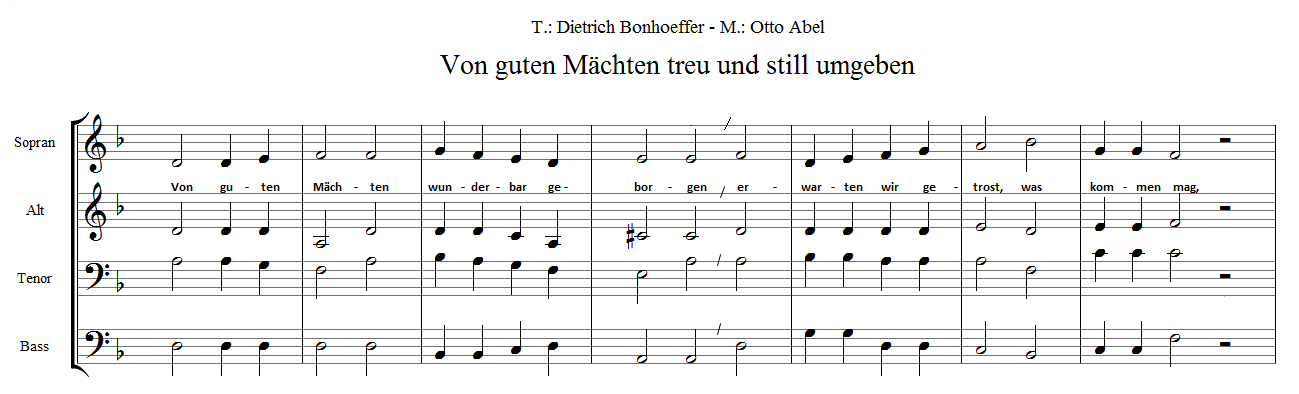
Beginning of the hymn Von guten Mächten wunderbar geborgen by Dietrich Bonhoeffer and Otto Abel

- Angels We Have Heard on High (translation from French) (EG 54, Gesangbuch der Evangelisch-reformierten Kirchen der deutschsprachigen Schweiz 418)
- Von guten Mächten treu und still umgeben (Melody and movement 1959, texte by Dietrich Bonhoeffer 1944) (EG 65, Gesangbuch der Evangelisch-reformierten Kirchen der deutschsprachigen Schweiz 353, Katholisches Gesangbuch der deutschsprachigen Schweiz 554)
- O Heiland, reiß die Himmel auf; Little Advent cantata for soprano, three-part mixed choir with flute, oboe, and organ with cello ad libitum; published by Evangelische Verlagsanstalt in Berlin; 1956
- Sei Lob und Ehr dem höchsten Gut; Cantata for mixed choir, string quartet and organ; published by the Evangelische Verlagsanstalt in Berlin; 1957
- Mein Gott, mein Gott, warum hast du mich verlassen?; Motet for three-part mixed choir
- Ich hebe meine Augen auf; Texte: Psalm 121, 1-3,8; for four-part mixed choir
