= Bangor Theological Seminary =

- Bangor Theological Seminary Historic District
- U.S. National Register of Historic Places
- U.S. Historic district
- Bangor Theological Seminary Chapel

- Location within Maine Location within the United States
- Location: Union St., Bangor, Maine
- Coordinates: 44.802145°N 68.780484°W
- Area: 7.5 acres (3.0 ha)
- Built: 1827; 199 years ago
- Architect: multiple
- Architectural style: Late Victorian, Federal, Greek Revival
- NRHP reference No.: 77000080
- Added to NRHP: August 2, 1977

Bangor Theological Seminary was an ecumenical seminary, founded in 1814 (212 years ago), in the Congregational tradition of the United Church of Christ. Located in Bangor, Maine, and Portland, Maine, it was the only accredited graduate school of religion in Northern New England.

The seminary had campuses in Bangor and Portland, Maine. Its primary mission was preparation for Christian ministry and providing a general theological education. Graduate programs included the Master of Divinity (M.Div.), Master of Arts (MA) and the Doctor of Ministry (D.Min.) degrees. The school was accredited by the Association of Theological Schools in the United States and Canada, New England Association of Schools and Colleges, and Maine Board of Education. Bangor Theological Seminary was an official Open and Affirming seminary.

The school closed with its final commencement service on June 22, 2013.

== History ==
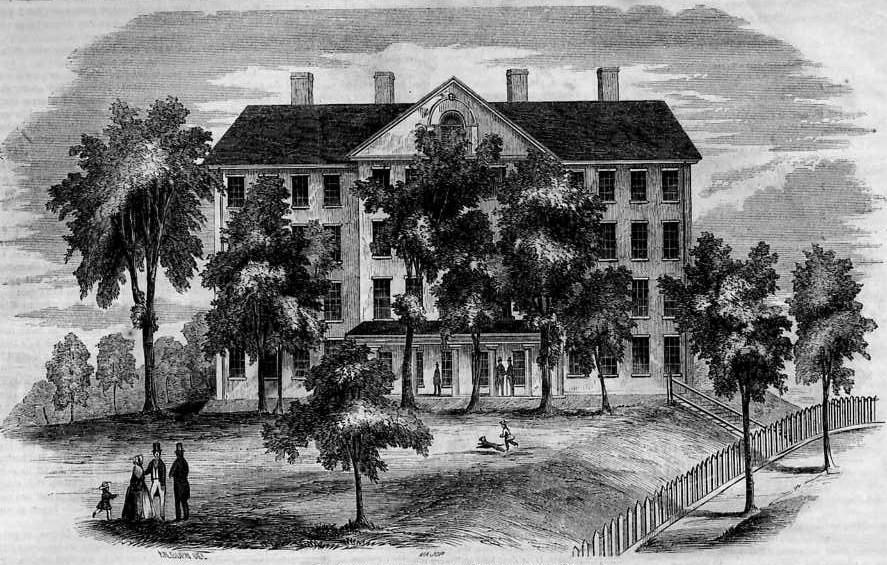
Theological Seminary, at Bangor, Maine, an 1853 engraving

Bangor Theological Seminary was originally of a much more conservative tradition/philosophy than what it evolved into. Led by a group of Congregational ministers and lay leaders who wanted to create a center of theological study in northern New England, the Society for Theological Education met on July 27, 1811, in Portland to establish a school. Jonathan Fisher, a founding trustee, described the urgency and importance of the school's mission:

"I am strongly adverse to an unlearned ministry, but if in this district we wait to be supplied from other institutions, I am fully persuaded that the ground would be preoccupied by Sectarians, many of whom will not only be unlearned, but very unlearned."

Granted a charter on February 25, 1814, by the Great and General Court of Massachusetts, the Maine Charity School shared space with Hampden Academy before moving to its Bangor location in 1819.

The seminary began to assume its later shape under the leadership of the Reverend Enoch Pond. A noted scholar and writer, Pond joined the faculty in 1833, became president in 1856, and remained in that capacity until his death in 1882. In 1858, running a $3000 deficit, it considered consolidating with Bowdoin College or Andover Theological Seminary, but was able to recover.

It sold its historic campus after moving to the Husson University campus in 2005.

At the time of its closing in May 2013, Bangor Theological Seminary had academic programs leading to the Master of Divinity degree, the Master of Arts degree, and the Doctor of Ministry degree. The seminary was ecumenical in nature, with over a dozen religious traditions represented among students and faculty. One of seven United Church of Christ seminaries in the United States, it was the only accredited theological institution in northern New England.

The school website states that its "spiritual successor" is the BTS Center, a non-profit "educational venture" offering opportunities for professional development for both clergy and laity, as well as robust non-degree programs exploring issues of contemporary Christianity and spirituality.

== Campus ==
The seminary's former campus is located just west of central downtown Bangor, occupying the central portion of an irregular city block bounded by Hammond, Cedar, Pond, and Union Streets. The location was a hayfield donated to the seminary by Bangor resident Isaac Davenport. The oldest building on the campus, Old Commons, dated to 1827-28, and was the second building built for the seminary; the first, a chapel, burned down in 1829. The new chapel was built in 1858-59, and is a fine Italianate building designed by William G. Morse. Two of its later buildings, the Denio House and the Gymnasium, were designed by Wilfred E. Mansur, a prominent Bangor architect, in the 1890s. The last addition to the campus was the Moulton Library, designed by Crowell, Lancaster, Higgins & Webster and built in 1959. The campus was listed on the National Register of Historic Places in 1977, in recognition of the seminary's historical importance. Since the school's closure, the buildings have been adapted to other uses. In 2009, the chapel and gymnasium were purchased by the Bangor Masonic Foundation, and now houses the Bangor Masonic Center and the Bangor Children's Dyslexia Learning Center.

== Notable alumni ==
- Elias Bond (1813–1896), missionary to Hawaii
- Joshua Lawrence Chamberlain, governor, Civil War general
- David H. Cyr, Deputy Chief of Chaplains of the U.S. Air Force
- Daniel Dole (1808–1878), missionary to Hawaii, and founder of Punahou School
- Samuel C. Fessenden, U.S. Congressman
- Cyrus Hamlin, founder of Robert College (Istanbul)
- Daniel Collamore Heath, publisher
- Charles Henry Howard, Civil War general and editor
- John Davis Paris (1809–1892), missionary to Hawaii
- Arthur B. Patten, minister and hymn-writer
- Minot Judson Savage, minister, author, and spiritualist
- Elkanah Walker, missionary and early settler in Oregon
- David Atwood Wasson, minister and transcendentalist

== Notable faculty ==
- Jehudi Ashmun, later a founder of Liberia
- William H. Barbour Jr., later Pastor of Yale College, 1877–87
- Samuel Harris, later President of Bowdoin College, 1867-71
- Burton H. Throckmorton Jr., pastor and professor
- David Trobisch
