= Angels We Have Heard on High =

Christmas carol

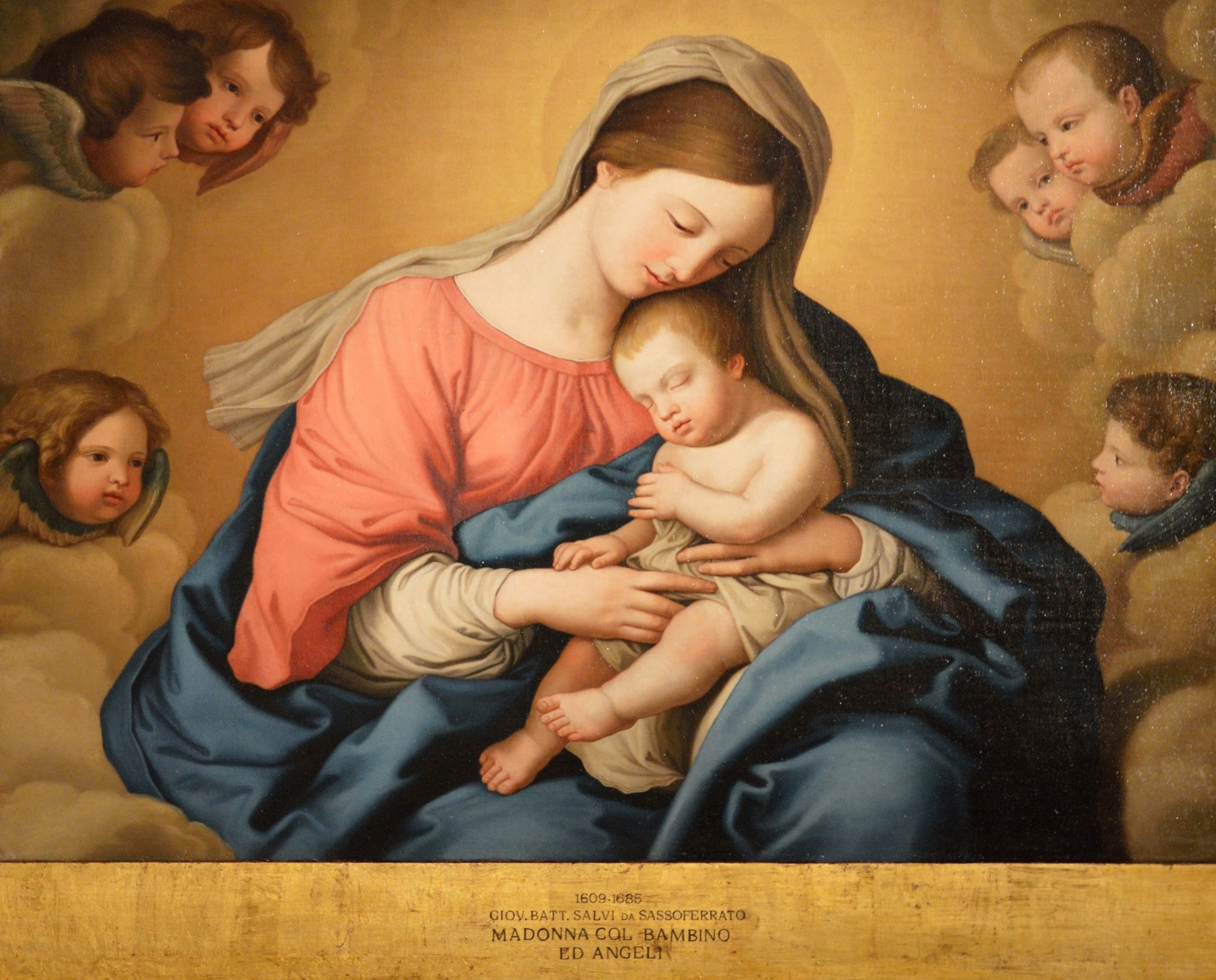
- Madonna with Child and Angels by Giovanni Battista Salvi da Sassoferrato
- Genre: Hymn
- Occasion: Christmas
- Written: 1862
- Text: Unknown French original; English paraphrase by James Chadwick
- Based on: Luke 2:8–20
- Meter: 7.7.7.7 with refrain
- Melody: "Gloria", arranged by Edward Shippen Barnes

"Angels We Have Heard on High"
Chorus of U.S. Army Band, a cappella

"Angels We Have Heard on High"
Performed by Kevin MacLeod on piano

"Angels We Have Heard on High" is a Christmas carol to the hymn tune "Gloria" from a traditional French song called "Les Anges dans nos campagnes", with paraphrased English lyrics by James Chadwick. The song's subject is the birth of Jesus Christ as narrated in the Gospel of Luke, specifically the scene outside Bethlehem in which shepherds encounter a multitude of angels singing and praising the newborn child.

== Tune ==
"Angels We Have Heard on High" is generally sung to the hymn tune "Gloria", a traditional French carol as arranged by Edward Shippen Barnes. Its most memorable feature is its chorus, "Gloria in excelsis Deo", where the "o" of "Gloria" is fluidly sustained through 16 notes of a rising and falling melismatic melodic sequence.

"Les Anges dans nos campagnes" is sung to a similar tune known as "Iris". This tune takes its name from the newspaper associated with James Montgomery, who wrote "Angels from the Realms of Glory", the version of this carol normally sung in the United Kingdom. "Iris" is also generally used with "Shepherds in the Fields Abiding", the version normally sung in Canada.

== Lyrics ==
Like the 1816 "Angels from the Realms of Glory", the lyrics of "Angels We Have Heard on High" are inspired by, but not an exact translation of, the traditional French carol now known as "Les Anges dans nos campagnes" ("the angels in our countryside"). Its first known publication was in 1805 in a book of French carols by Révérend Père Roche, as "J'Entends, là sur ces collines". No author of the carol was given, and it is unclear whether Rev. Roche wrote the carol or merely collected it. The melody, listed as "Cherche-moi, etc.", has not yet been identified. Twelve stanzas were provided, with the first stanza significantly different from what was later more widely adopted. Dozens of textual variants appeared in the 19th century.

The earliest known publication of the carol as "Les Anges dans nos campagnes", with text and notes, was in 1842. The music was attributed to "W. M.". According to some websites, the music is by the nineteenth-century Wilfrid Moreau from Poitiers. This should probably read Wulfran Moreau (1827–1905), who, though only about fifteen years old in 1842, was from Poitiers and later was professor of rhetoric at Montmorillon and a published composer of religious and school music.

"Angels We Have Heard on High" was an 1862 paraphrase by James Chadwick, the Roman Catholic Bishop of Hexham and Newcastle, in the north-east of England. Chadwick's lyrics, original in some sections, and loosely translated from the French in other sections, may have been based on multiple versions of the French carol. The carol quickly became popular in the West Country, where it was described as "Cornish" by R. R. Chope, and featured in William Adair Pickard-Cambridge's Collection of Dorset Carols. It has since been translated into other languages, and is widely sung and published. Modern hymnals usually include three verses.

=== English ===
Angels we have heard on high
Sweetly singing o'er the plains
And the mountains in reply
Echoing their joyous strains
|: Gloria in excelsis Deo! :|

Shepherds, why this jubilee?
Why your joyous strains prolong?
What the gladsome tidings be?
Which inspire your heavenly songs?
|: Gloria in excelsis Deo! :|

Come to Bethlehem and see
Him whose birth the angels sing;
Come, adore on bended knee,
Christ the Lord, the newborn King.
|: Gloria in excelsis Deo! :|

See Him in a manger laid
Whom the choirs of angels praise;
Mary, Joseph, lend your aid,
While our heart in love we raise.
|: Gloria in excelsis Deo! :|

=== French ===
(First stanza, 1805 version)
J'Entends, là sur ces collines,
Les Anges descendus des Cieux,
Chanter d'une voix divine
Ce Cantique mélodieux,
|: Gloria in excelsis Deo! :|

(First stanza, 1842 version)
Les anges dans nos campagnes
Ont entonné l'hymne des cieux,
Et l'écho de nos montagnes
Redit ce chant mélodieux
|: Gloria in excelsis Deo! :|

Bergers, pour qui cette fête?
Quel est l'objet de tous ces chants?
Quel vainqueur, quelle conquête
Mérite ces cris triomphants?
|: Gloria in excelsis Deo! :|

Ils annoncent la naissance
Du libérateur d'Israël
Et pleins de reconnaissance
Chantent en ce jour solennel
|: Gloria in excelsis Deo! :|

=== German ===
In 1951, Lieselotte Holzmeister (1921–1994) translation „Engel haben Himmelslieder“ (Angels Have Heavenly Songs) was the first transmission in German-speaking countries. Another German text version comes from Otto Abel (1905–1977); „Hört der Engel helle Lieder“ (Hear the angels' bright songs). It was created in 1954 and was included in the German evangelical hymn book (EG 54); The chorus is accompanied by a movement for three equal voices by Theophil Rothenberg. Also in 1954, Maria Luise Thurmair wrote "Engel auf den Feldern singen" (Angels sing in the fields). The same melody was used by Diethard Zils for a hymn for Epiphany, "Seht ihr unsern Stern dort stehen" (Do you see our star there standing). Both hymns are part of the Catholic hymnal Gotteslob. The Austrian composer Cesar Bresgen (1913–1988) created two other arrangements. Johannes Haas (1931–2004) created „Engel bringen frohe Kunde“ (Angels Bring Good News"). A translation by the evangelist Manfred Paul (1938–2020) appeared in 1972 under the title „Friede, Freude hier auf Erden“ (Peace, Joy here on Earth). Rolf Zuckowski (*1947) published his text version „Hört ihr, wie die Engel singen“ (Hear how the angels sing) in 1987.

== See also ==
- "Ding Dong Merrily on High" – similar Gloria refrain
- List of Christmas carols
