= Ethics (Bonhoeffer book) =

Book by Dietrich Bonhoeffer

- Author: Dietrich Bonhoeffer
- Original title: Ethik
- Language: German
- Subjects: Christlikeness; Ethics; Patriotism
- Published: 1949
- Publication place: Germany

Ethics (German: Ethik) is an unfinished book by Dietrich Bonhoeffer that was edited and published after his death by Eberhard Bethge in 1949. Bonhoeffer worked on the book in the early 1940s and intended it to be his magnum opus. At the time of writing, he was a double agent; he was working for Abwehr, Nazi Germany's military intelligence organization but was simultaneously involved in the 20 July plot to assassinate Adolf Hitler. The central theme of Ethics is Christlikeness. The arguments in the book are informed by Lutheran Christology and are influenced by Bonhoeffer's participation in the German resistance to Nazism. Ethics is commonly compared to Bonhoeffer's earlier book The Cost of Discipleship, with scholars debating the extent to which Bonhoeffer's views on Christian ethics changed between his writing of the two books. In The Cambridge Companion to Dietrich Bonhoeffer, John W. de Gruchy argues that Ethics evinces more nuance than Bonhoeffer's earlier writings. In 2012, David P. Gushee, director of Mercer University's Center for Theology and Public Life, named Ethics one of the five best books about patriotism.

== Bibliography ==
- de Gruchy, John W. (1991). Dietrich Bonhoeffer: Witness to Jesus Christ. Augsburg Fortress. ISBN 1451411588.
- de Gruchy, John W. (1999). The Cambridge Companion to Dietrich Bonhoeffer. Cambridge University Press. ISBN 0521587816.
- DeJonge, Michael P. (2012). Bonhoeffer's Theological Formation: Berlin, Barth, and Protestant Theology. Oxford University Press. ISBN 978-0199639786.
- Green, Clifford J. (1999). Bonhoeffer: A Theology of Sociality. William B. Eerdmans Publishing Company. ISBN 0802846327.
- Kelly, Geffrey B.; F. Burton Nelson (2003). The Cost of Moral Leadership: The Spirituality of Dietrich Bonhoeffer. William B. Eerdmans Publishing. ISBN 0802805116.
- Metaxas, Eric (2015). Bonhoeffer Student Edition: Pastor, Martyr, Prophet, Spy. Thomas Nelson. ISBN 978-0718022440.
- Muers, Rachel (2007). Jackie Leach Scully; Pink Dandelion (eds.). "'It is Worse to Be Evil Than to Do Evil': Dietrich Bonhoeffer's Challenge to the Quaker Conscience". Good and Evil: Quaker Perspectives. Ashgate Publishing. ISBN 978-0754656210.
- Plant, Stephen (2014). Taking Stock of Bonhoeffer: Studies in Biblical Interpretation and Ethics. Ashgate Publishing. ISBN 978-1409441069.
