= Siegfried Fietz =

German singer-songwriter and composer

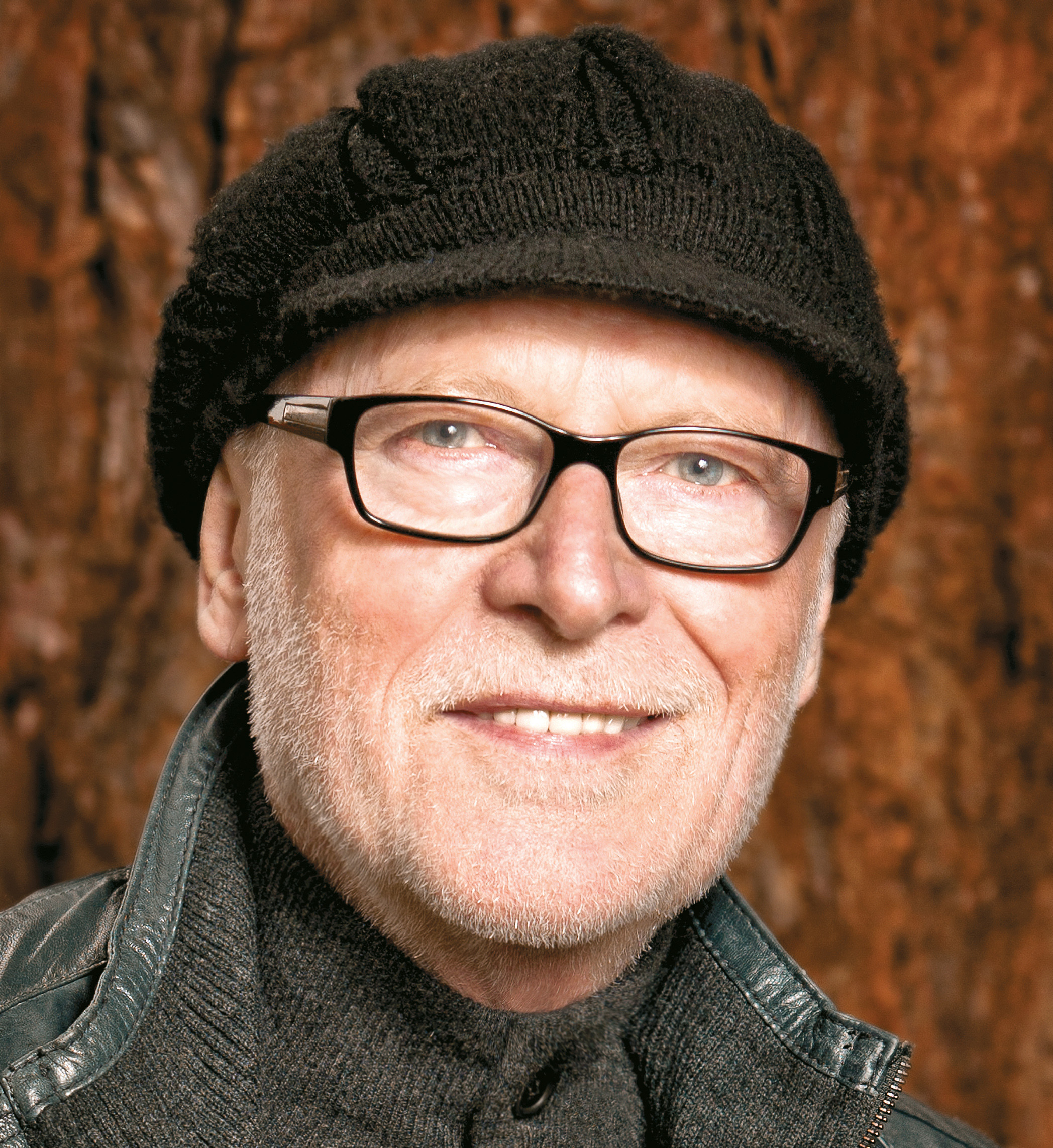
- Fietz in 2012
- Born: 25 May 1946 (age 79); Berleburg
- Occupations: Composer; Singer-songwriter; Music producer; Sculptor
- Organizations: Hessischer Rundfunk; Abakus Musik Verlag

Siegfried Fietz (German: [ˈziːkfʁiːt ˈfiːts]; born 25 May 1946) is a German singer-songwriter, composer, music producer and sculptor. He is known for songs of the genre Neues Geistliches Lied, particularly his setting of Dietrich Bonhoeffer's poem "Von guten Mächten".

== Career ==
Born in Berleburg, Fietz grew up in Hilchenbach. He began to play on his father's violin at age five, and learned to play the guitar a little later. He began voice training at age 15, and piano lessons at age 17. A year later, he took an exam as a church musician and organist. He studied composition with Gustav Adolf Schlemm.

He gave his first concerts with his friend Klaus Panthel, as the Fietz Team, at the festival Offene Abende Siegen (Open evenings [at] Siegen) which attracted up to 10,000 visitors. Fietz wrote new songs in German for these occasions, inviting the audience to sing along. He wrote a setting of the poem "Von guten Mächten" that Dietrich Bonhoeffer wrote in prison in 1944. The song has become part of the German Protestant and Catholic hymnals. Fietz had written the melodies for 3000 songs by the age of 65.

Fietz moderated a series for the broadcaster Hessischer Rundfunk, Lieder zwischen Himmel und Erde (Songs between Heaven and Earth), with up to 150,000 listeners.

Fietz founded a music edition, the Abakus Musik Verlag, together with his wife Barbara. They have published around 250 productions with him as a performer, and others, to a total of 320 recordings. He has collaborated with Ivan Rebroff, Clemens Bittlinger, Dieter Falk, Eberhard Weber, Petula Clark, Uwe Kröger, Eva Lind, Bill Ramsey, Edwin Hawkins, Olivia Molina and Coretta Scott King. He developed a Weltraumsinfonie (Space Symphony) with the astronaut James Irwin.

His oratorio Franziskus – Ein Heiliger und ein Papst premiered in 2016 at the 100th Katholikentag in Leipzig.

Since 1995, Fietz has also worked as an artist, creating abstract paintings and wooden sculptures. His first exposition was in 2009. He opened a sculpture park in Greifenstein-Allendorf in 2015.

== Literature ==
- Jan Vering: Siegfried Fietz – Von guten Mächten und bewegten Zeiten. Biographie, Gerth, Asslar 2011, ISBN 978-3-86591-582-5.
- Siegfried Fietz: Aufbruch wagen. Kunst Broschüre, Abakus Musik, Greifenstein 2012, ISBN 978-3-88124-522-7.
- Siegfried Fietz: Skulpturen Bilder. Kunst Broschüre, Abakus Musik, Greifenstein 2011.
