= Maria von Wedemeyer Weller =

American computer scientist

- Born: April 23, 1924; Pätzig, Weimar Republic
- Died: November 16, 1977 (aged 53); Boston, Massachusetts, U.S.
- Education: Bryn Mawr College
- Scientific career
- Fields: Computer science
- Workplaces: Remington Rand, Honeywell

Maria von Wedemeyer Weller (23 April 1924 – 16 November 1977) was an American computer scientist, who emigrated from Germany to the US after the Second World War. She was known in the field of computer science for her role in developing emulation capability. She was also notable as having been the fiancée of the German Protestant theologian and Resistance worker Dietrich Bonhoeffer.

== Life ==
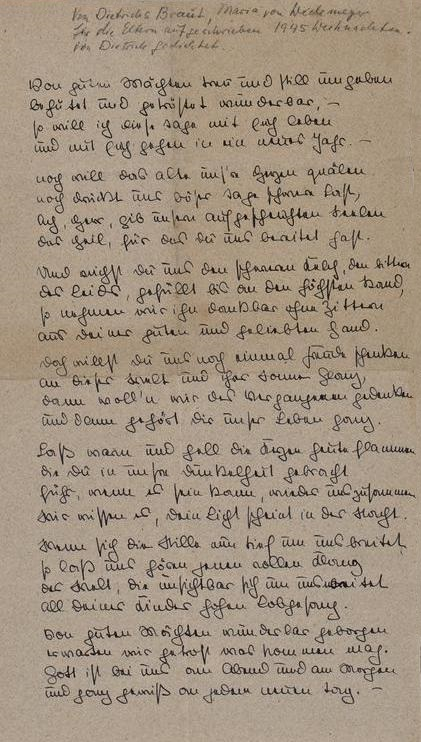
von Wedemeyer's copy of Good Powers.

Maria von Wedemeyer was born in 1924 at Pätzig in the Neumark area of Brandenburg to Hans von Wedemeyer, a landowner / gentleman farmer, and his wife Ruth (née von Kleist-Retzow). Maria was the third of their seven children. Relatives came from the Bismarck family and other Prussian noble families. She grew up on her parents' estate at Pätzig.

=== Relationship with Bonhoeffer ===
Von Wedemeyer first met Bonhoeffer in the urban home of Ruth von Kleist-Retzow, her maternal grandmother, when she was 11 or 12 years old. He was conducting confirmation classes for Maria's elder brother and cousins; and the grandmother asked if Maria could be included. Bonhoeffer interviewed her and refused to have her join the class due to her "immaturity".

Bonhoeffer and von Wedemeyer were reintroduced seven years later when Bonhoeffer was on a writing retreat at Ruth von Kleist-Retzow's country home, Klein-Krössin. Notwithstanding their age difference of 18 years — she was 18 years old and he was 36 — they developed a rapport. They became engaged on 13 January 1943.

Less than three months after their engagement, Bonhoeffer was arrested for his activities in resisting the Nazi government. He and von Wedemeyer corresponded during his imprisonment in Tegel Prison and she was permitted to visit him "fairly regularly, at least once a month". After he was implicated by association with the Abwehr members who planned the 20 July 1944 plot to assassinate Hitler, Bonhoeffer was transferred to the Gestapo high security prison at Prinz-Albrecht-Strasse and was permitted no further contact with her or his family.

Bonhoeffer, and most of the other incarcerated members of the 20th of July plot, were ultimately executed just before the end of the war. Bonhoeffer was hanged at the Flossenbürg concentration camp on 9 April 1945. Bonhoeffer's remaining possessions from his time in prison were returned to his parents, including the letters that Maria had written to him. His parents returned those letters to her and, as result, she possessed their (essentially) complete correspondence.

=== Computer science career and marriages ===
Following the war, von Wedemeyer began studying mathematics at the University of Göttingen (1945-1947); then at the University of Frankfurt (1947-1948). From 1948-1950, she continued her studies on a scholarship to Bryn Mawr College near Philadelphia, graduating with an MA in 1950.

In 1949, she returned to Germany to marry Paul Werner Schniewind (born 1923), son of the theologian Julius Schniewind, and they decided to emigrate to the United States. They had two children before their marriage ended in divorce in 1959. During this time, she initially was completing her Masters Degree at Bryn Mawr, then was employed as a statistician. She soon moved on to employment at the pioneering computer company, Remington Rand UNIVAC, writing code (in machine language). Following her divorce from Schniewind, she married an American semiconductor manufacturer, Barton L Weller, but they divorced in 1965.

Following this divorce, she returned to the computer industry, joining Honeywell Information Systems, which was based near Boston, and advanced from being a technical employee to a series of management positions.

In 1974, she gave a presentation on the development of the decompiler at the Association for Computing Machinery (ACM).

=== Donation of Bonhoeffer letters ===
In 1966, she donated the Bonhoeffer letters and manuscripts that she possessed (including the original of Faithfully and Quietly Surrounded by Good Powers, Jonah, The Death of Moses and The Past) to the Houghton Library of Harvard University, with access to them initially restricted until her death, then later further restricted until 2002 (25 years following her death). She published selected excerpts from the letters in 1967 under the title 'The Other Letters From Prison' in the journal of the Union Theological Seminary. The publication of this article resulted in extensive coverage in the media - with articles on the front page of the New York Times, and in TIME, Newsweek and other publications.

=== Death ===
She died of cancer, in 1977, at Massachusetts General Hospital in Boston. She was survived by her two sons and one stepdaughter. Her ashes are buried at the Catholic graveyard Gernsbach in the von Wedemeyer family gravesite in Gernsbach, Germany, where a memorial tablet to her, created by Andreas Helmling, was placed in the cemetery chapel in September 2009. Fifteen years after her death, the complete correspondence with Bonhoeffer was published by her elder sister, Ruth-Alice von Bismarck (wife of Klaus von Bismarck) as Brautbriefe Zelle 92 - Dietrich Bonhoeffer / Maria von Wedemeyer 1943-1945. This book has subsequently been translated into English, French, Japanese and other languages.

== Bibliography ==
- (in German) "Books on and by von Wedemeyer". in the Deutsche Nationalbibliothek catalogue
- (in German) Ruth-Alice von Bismarck, Urich Kabitz (ed.): Brautbriefe Zelle 92 – Dietrich Bonhoeffer / Maria von Wedemeyer 1943–1945. C.H. Beck, München 1992, ISBN 978-3-406-36795-3.
- (in English) Ruth-Alice von Bismarck, Urich Kabitz (ed.): Love Letters from Cell 92: The Correspondence Between Dietrich Bonhoeffer and Maria Von Wedemeyer
- (in German) Renate Wind: 'Liebe als Produktivkraft.' In: Dietrich Bonhoeffer – Allein in der Tat ist die Freiheit. Publik-Forum Dossier; Publik-Forum Verlagsgesellschaft, Oberursel März 2005.
- (in German) Paavo Rintala: Marias Liebe. Ein biographischer Roman. Evangelische Verlagsanstalt, Leipzig 2006, ISBN 978-3-374-02363-9.
- (in German) Renate Wind: Wer leistet sich heute noch eine wirkliche Sehnsucht? Maria von Wedemeyer und Dietrich Bonhoeffer. Gütersloher Verlagshaus, Gütersloh 2006, ISBN 978-3-579-07124-4.
- (in German) Birgit Schlegel: Maria von Wedemeyer, Nachfahrin Katlenburger Amtmänner und Braut Dietrich Bonhoeffers. In: Northeimer Jahrbuch 82.2017, p. 115–124
