= Richard Hanson (bishop) =

Irish bishop

Richard Patrick Crosland Hanson, FBA, MRIA (1916–1988) was bishop of Clogher in the Church of Ireland from 1970 to 1973. A historian of antiquity (he claimed to distrust history written concerning periods subsequent to 600 AD) he was particularly noted for a life of St. Patrick. He discovered that ecumenical work was particularly restricted in the context of the Troubles in a diocese lying on both sides of the border between Northern Ireland and the Republic of Ireland, which he accordingly resigned to take up a professorship in Systematic Theology in the Faculty of Theology at Manchester University. During this period he worked notably on the evolution of Christian theology in the period between (and immediately prior to) the Councils of Nicaea (325 AD) and Constantinople (381 AD) He was the first British or Irish contributor to the Sources Chrétiennes collection of early Christian writings.

Among his writings was Reasonable Belief, which was written jointly with his brother, Anthony Tyrrell Hanson, a Professor of Theology at Hull University. In the introduction he notes "One of the authors is an Anglican priest and the other an Anglican bishop, and neither can jump out of his skin" and "It should perhaps be explained that this book is not only a collaboration between two Anglican theologians but between two identical twin brothers."

First published in the year of his death (1988), his book, The Search for the Christian Doctrine of God: The Arian Controversy, 318–381, is still considered by many scholars to be the finest work on the Arian controversy. Rowan Williams described it as an indispensable tool for future researchers and stated that there is nothing else in English of comparable scope. Trevor A. Hart, lecturer in Systematic Theology in the University of Aberdeen, described it as the distillation of some twenty years' careful research and also stated that nothing comparable exists in either scale or erudition in the English language. Kevin Giles refers to this book as Hanson’s "definitive book on Arianism".

== Publications (selected) ==
- 1948, 1960, 2nd ed. The Church of Rome: A Dissuasive (with Reginald H. Fuller). Seabury.
- 1954: Origen's Doctrine of Tradition
- 1962: Tradition in the Early Church London: SCM Press.
- 1968: Saint Patrick
- 1978: Saint Patrick: Confession et lettre à Coroticus, (Sources Chrétiennes; no. 249 )(annotated edition with French translation)
- Hanson, Robert (1981). Reasonable Belief: A Survey of the Christian Faith. Oxford: Oxford University Press. ISBN 0-19-213235-0. Archived from the original on 4 March 2016 – via Questia.
- 1988: The Search for the Christian Doctrine of God: The Arian Controversy 318-381
