= Arthur B. Patten =

American writer

Arthur Bardwell Patten (March 26, 1864 – May 10, 1952) was a distinguished United States Congregational Church clergyman who served congregations in New England and the Pacific coast. He was the author of books, hymn texts and poems. His best remembered work is the hymn text "Faith of Our Mothers," written circa 1920.

== Early life and education ==
Patten was born in Bowdoinham, Maine, on March 26, 1864, the son of Captain Bardwell P. Patten and Frances J. ("Fanny") Meserve. His Patten ancestors were among the earliest settlers in Bowdoinham; a section of the town called Patten's Landing is named for them.

Patten was educated at Colby University (AB 1890) and received his theology degree from Bangor Theological Seminary (in 1893). He was ordained as a Congregational minister in Everett, Massachusetts, on February 1, 1894. Patten was part of the world mission movement of the late 1800s that strove to "reach the world for Jesus in our generation."

== Ordained ministry ==
Patten served pastorates at First Congregational Church, Everett, Massachusetts, from 1895 to 1897, First Congregational Church, South Hadley, Massachusetts, 1897–1905; First Congregational Church, Santa Rosa, California, 1905–1909; Sacramento, California, 1909–1917; Forest Grove Congregational Church, Oregon, 1917–1919; Center Church, Torrington, Connecticut.; 1919–1929; Madison Congregational Church, Connecticut, 1929–1934.

Patten was the author of books, articles and poems, including:

- "The Awakening" – 1892
- "The Religious Training of Children" – 1897
- "With God at Sea" (poem) in "The Sea Breeze" by Boston Seaman's Friends Society – 1900
- "Youth, Plus" (poem)
- A Hymn for the Dedication of the New Organ at Torrington, CT – 1922
- "Can We Find God?" – (George H. Doran Co., New York) – 1924
- "Open Letter to Prof. John Dewey" – 1933

== Personal life ==
Patten married the former Kate Howes Ryder of Chelsea, Massachusetts (born November 26, 1876) on October 1, 1896. They had had three sons: Ryder (the eldest; 31 July 1897 – August 1957), Julian and Roger Wolcott Patten (the youngest). Tragedy struck the family on July 8, 1903, when A.B.'s son Roger aged one year and a half was drowned while they were vacationing at Lake Winnipesaukee, New Hampshire.

Arthur B. Patten died at Claremont, California, on May 10, 1952.

== The text of "Faith of Our Mothers" ==
Faith of our mothers, living still,
In cradle song and bedtime prayer;
In nursery lore and fireside love,
Thy presence still pervades the air:
Faith of our mothers, living faith!
We will be true to thee to death.

Faith of our mothers, loving faith,
Fount of our childhood's trust and grace,
Oh, may thy consecration prove
Source of a finer, nobler race:
Faith of our mothers, living faith,
We will be true to thee till death.

Faith of our mothers, guiding faith,
For youthful longing, youthful doubt,
How blurred our vision, blind our way,
Thy providential care without:
Faith of our mothers, guiding faith,
We will be true to thee till death.

Faith of our mothers, Christian faith,
Is truth beyond our stumbling creeds,
Still serve the home and save the Church,
And breathe thy spirit through our deeds:
Faith of our mothers, Christian faith!
We will be true to thee till death.
