= Burton H. Throckmorton Jr. =

Burton Hamiliton Throckmorton Jr. (1921 in Elizabeth, New Jersey – 2009 in Bangor, Maine) was an American New Testament scholar. He was Hayes Professor of New Testament Language and Literature at Bangor Theological Seminary from 1954 to 1989, and a minister in the Presbyterian Church (USA) and the United Church of Christ.

== Early life ==
Burton H. Throckmorton Jr. was born to a family of five in Elizabeth, New Jersey on February 21, 1921.

== Education ==
Throckmorton earned a Bachelor of Art degree from the University of Virginia in 1943. Later, he studied at the University of Marburg in Germany.

=== New York ===
Throckmorton began studying at the Juilliard School of Music. He later earned a bachelor of Divinity from Union Theological Seminary in 1945 and a doctorate of philosophy from Columbia University in 1952.

== Celebrity ==
=== 1932-1934 ===
From 1932-1934, Throckmorton performed a tap dance routine with his sister, Joan Throckmorton, for the revue, "Sunday Nights at Nine," starring Shirley Booth and Van Heflin, on Broadway.

=== 1980s and 1990s ===
Following the publications of his works in the 1980s and 1990s, Throckmorton appeared on various radio programs in addition to "CBS This Morning" and "The Phil Donahue Show."

== Works ==
- Gospel Parallels 1949, 5th edition 1993. This is one of the standard Gospel Synopsis texts.
- The New Testament and Mythology 1952, The Westminster Press
- Romans for the Layman 1961, The Seabury Press: reprinted under the title “Adopted Love” 1978
- pamphlet “The Bible and the Church” 1989
- Jesus Christ, The Message of the Gospels, The Hope of the Church 1989, Westminster John Knox Press
