= Dietrich Bonhoeffer =

German Lutheran pastor and theologian (1906–1945)

The Reverend Dietrich Bonhoeffer
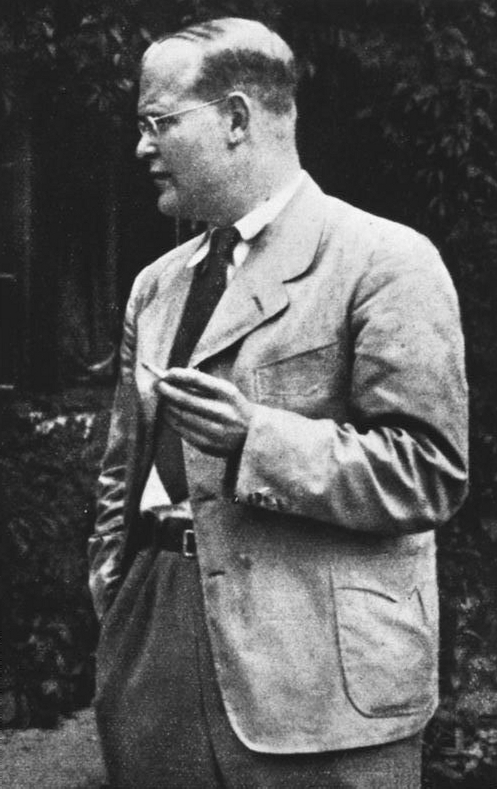
- Bonhoeffer in 1939
- Born: 4 February 1906; Breslau, Kingdom of Prussia, German Empire
- Died: 9 April 1945 (aged 39); Flossenbürg, Nazi Germany
- Cause of death: Execution by hanging
- Education: University of Tübingen (attended); Frederick William University of Berlin (D.Th.)
- Father: Karl Bonhoeffer
- Relatives: Klaus Bonhoeffer (brother); Karl-Friedrich Bonhoeffer (brother); Sabine Bonhoeffer-Leibholz (sister); Hans von Dohnányi (brother-in-law)

Ecclesiastical career
- Religion: Christianity (Lutheran)
- Church: Evangelical Church of the old-Prussian Union (1906–1933); Confessing Church (1933–1945)
- Writings: The Cost of Discipleship; Sanctorum Communio; Act and Being
- Congregations: Zion's Church congregation, Berlin; German-speaking congregations of St. Paul's and Sydenham, London
- Offices held: Privatdozent at the Frederick William University of Berlin (1931–1936); Student pastor at the Technische Hochschule in Berlin (now Technische Universität Berlin) (1931–1933); Lecturer of Confessing Church candidates of pastorate in Finkenwalde (1935–1937)

Dietrich Bonhoeffer (Note: German pronunciation: [ˈdiːtʁɪç ˈbɔnhøːfɐ].) (4 February 1906 – 9 April 1945) was a German Lutheran pastor, neo-orthodox theologian and anti-Nazi dissident who was a key founding member of the Confessing Church. His writings on Christianity's role in the secular world have become widely influential; his 1937 book The Cost of Discipleship is described as a modern classic. Apart from his theological writings, Bonhoeffer was known for his staunch resistance to the Nazi dictatorship, including vocal opposition to Nazi euthanasia program and genocidal persecution of Jews. He was arrested in April 1943 by the Gestapo and imprisoned at Tegel Prison for a year and a half. Later, he was transferred to Flossenbürg concentration camp.

Though many believe Bonhoeffer was accused of being associated with a plot to assassinate Hitler, the actual arrest and court documents show that he was arrested for his involvement in "Operation 7" – which succeeded in saving the lives of first 7 then 14 Jews. He was hanged on 9 April 1945 during the collapse of the Nazi regime.

== Childhood and family ==
Bonhoeffer was born on 4 February 1906 in Breslau, Germany (now Wrocław, Poland), into a large family. Dietrich and his twin sister, Sabine Bonhoeffer Leibholz, were the sixth and seventh children out of eight. His father, Karl Bonhoeffer, was a psychiatrist and neurologist, noted for his criticism of Sigmund Freud; his mother, Paula Bonhoeffer, was a teacher and the granddaughter of Protestant theologian Karl von Hase and painter Stanislaus von Kalckreuth. Bonhoeffer's family dynamic and his parents' values enabled him to receive a high level of education and encouraged his curiosity, which impacted his ability to lead others around him, specifically in the church setting. He learned how to play the piano at age eight and composed songs performed at the Philharmonic at age eleven. Walter Bonhoeffer, second born of the Bonhoeffer family, was killed in action during World War I, when Bonhoeffer was twelve years old.

At age fourteen, Bonhoeffer decided to pursue his education in theology despite the criticism of his older brothers Klaus, a lawyer, and Karl-Friedrich, a scientist. He took Hebrew as an elective in school and attended many evangelical meetings, moved by the manifold suffering inflicted by war. Bonhoeffer began his studies at Tübingen and eventually moved to the University of Berlin, where he defended his dissertation, Sanctorum Communio. At age twenty-one, on 17 December 1927, he went on to complete his Doctor of Theology degree from Humboldt University of Berlin, graduating summa cum laude.

== Early life ==
=== Studies in the United States ===
In 1930, Bonhoeffer moved to the United States with the intent of attaining a Sloane Fellowship at New York City's Union Theological Seminary. Bonhoeffer was greatly unimpressed with the theology of the United States. He described the students as lacking interest in theology and would "laugh out loud" when learning a passage from Martin Luther's Sin and Forgiveness. During his time there, he met Frank Fisher, a black seminarian who introduced him to the Abyssinian Baptist Church in Harlem, where Bonhoeffer taught Sunday school and formed a lifelong love for the African-American church. He heard Adam Clayton Powell Sr. preach the "Gospel of Social Justice" and became sensitive to the social injustices experienced by racial and ethnic minorities in the U.S., as well as the ineptitude of churches when it came to bringing about integration. He was captivated by the sermons he witnessed in black churches. The originally nationalist Bonhoeffer later changed his views after seeing All Quiet on the Western Front, which showed the horrors of war. Later in life he favored the views of pacifism, which promoted love for all people and placed a high value on each individual life. Bonhoeffer became involved with the ecumenical Christian movement, which eventually led him to resist Adolf Hitler and the Nazis.

=== Return to Germany ===
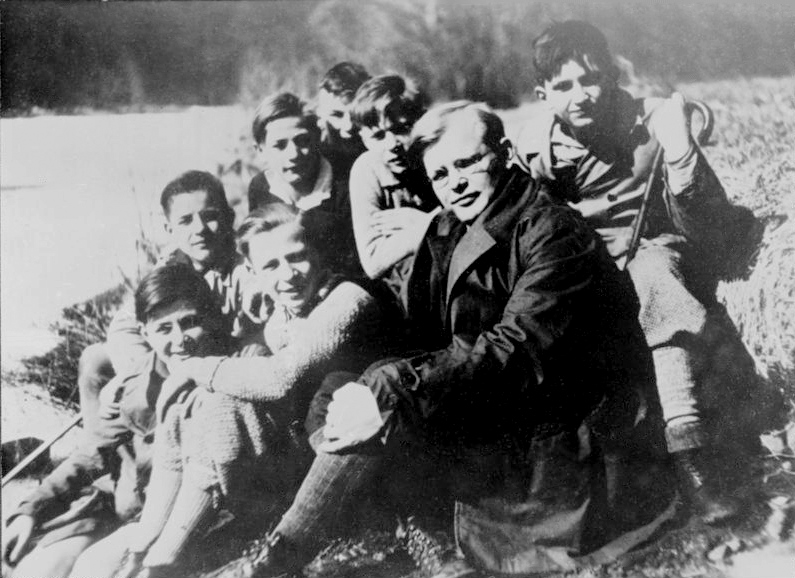
Bonhoeffer on a retreat weekend with confirmands of Zion's Church congregation (1932)

After returning to Germany in 1931, Bonhoeffer became a lecturer in systematic theology at the University of Berlin. Deeply interested in ecumenism, he was appointed by the World Alliance for Promoting International Friendship through the Churches (a forerunner of the World Council of Churches) as one of its three European youth secretaries. At this time he seems to have undergone a personal conversion, as he changed from being a theologian primarily attracted to the intellectual side of Christianity, to being a dedicated man of personal faith, resolved to literally carry out the teachings of Christ, revealed in the Gospels. On 15 November 1931, at age 25, he was ordained at Old-Prussian United St. Matthew in Berlin-Tiergarten.

== Anti-Nazism ==
Bonhoeffer's promising academic and ecclesiastical career was derailed by the Nazi ascent to power on 30 January 1933. He was a determined opponent of the regime from its first days. Two days after Hitler was installed as chancellor, Bonhoeffer delivered a radio address in which he attacked Hitler and warned Germany against slipping into an idolatrous cult of the Führer (leader), who he argued might well turn out to be verführer ("misleader", "seducer"). His broadcast was abruptly cut off, though it is unclear whether the newly elected Nazi regime was responsible.

In November 1932, two months before the Nazi takeover, there had been an election for presbyters and synodals (church officials) of the German Landeskirche (Protestant mainstream churches). This election was marked by a struggle within the Old-Prussian Union Protestant Church between the pro-Nazi Deutsche Christen (German Christian) movement and Young Reformers, who were interested in following the Gospel teachings of Jesus—a struggle that threatened to explode into schism. In July 1933, Hitler unconstitutionally imposed new church elections. Bonhoeffer put all his efforts into the election, campaigning for the selection of independent, non-Nazi officials who were dedicated to following Christ.

Despite Bonhoeffer's efforts, in the July election an overwhelming number of key church positions went to the Deutsche Christen. The Deutsche Christen won a majority in the Old-Prussian general synod and all its provincial synods except Westphalia, and in synods of all other Protestant church bodies, except for the Lutheran churches of Bavaria, Hanover, and Württemberg. The anti-Nazi Christian opposition regarded these bodies as uncorrupted "intact churches", as opposed to the other so-called "destroyed churches".

In opposition to Nazification, Bonhoeffer urged an interdict to stop offering all pastoral ceremonial services (baptisms, confirmations, weddings, funerals, etc.), but Karl Barth and others advised against such a radical proposal. In August 1933, Bonhoeffer and Hermann Sasse were deputized by opposition church leaders to draft the "Bethel Confession," as a statement of faith in opposition to the Deutsche Christen movement. Notable for affirming God's fidelity to Jews as His chosen people, the "Bethel Confession" was eventually so watered down to make it more palatable that ultimately Bonhoeffer refused to sign it.

In September 1933, the nationalist church synod at Wittenberg voluntarily passed a resolution to apply the Aryan paragraph within the church, meaning that pastors and church officials of Jewish descent were to be removed from their posts. Regarding this as an affront to the principle of baptism, Martin Niemöller founded the Pfarrernotbund (Pastors' Emergency League). In November, a rally of twenty thousand Deutsche Christens demanded the removal of the Jewish Old Testament from the Bible, which was seen by many as heresy, further swelling the ranks of the Pastors Emergency League.

Within weeks of its founding, more than a third of German pastors had joined the Emergency League, forerunner of the Bekennende Kirche (Confessing Church), which aimed to preserve historical, biblically based Christian beliefs and practices. The Barmen Declaration, drafted by Barth in May 1934 and adopted by the Confessing Church, insisted that Christ, not the Führer, was the head of the Church. The adoption of the declaration has often been viewed as a triumph, although only about twenty percent of German pastors supported the Confessing Church.

=== Ministries in London ===
When Bonhoeffer was offered a parish post in eastern Berlin in the autumn of 1933, he refused it in protest of the Nationalist policy, and he accepted a two-year appointment as a pastor of two German-speaking Protestant churches in London: the German Lutheran Church in Dacres Road, Sydenham, and the German Reformed Church of St Paul's, Goulston Street, Whitechapel. He explained to Barth that he had found little support for his views on devotion to literally following the words of Jesus—even among friends—and that "it was about time to go for a while into the desert". Barth regarded this as running away from a real battle. He sharply rebuked Bonhoeffer: "I can only reply to all the reasons and excuses which you put forward: 'And what will now happen to the people of the German Church?'" Barth accused Bonhoeffer of abandoning his post and wasting his "splendid theological armory" while "the house of your church is on fire", and chided him to return to Berlin "by the next ship".

Bonhoeffer, however, did not go to England simply to avoid trouble at home; he hoped to put the ecumenical movement to work in the interest of the Confessing Church. He continued his involvement with the Confessing Church, running up a high telephone bill to maintain his contact with Martin Niemöller. In international gatherings, Bonhoeffer rallied people to oppose the Deutsche Christen movement and its attempt to amalgamate Nazi nationalism with Christianity. When Bishop Theodor Heckel—the official in charge of German Lutheran Church foreign affairs—traveled to London to warn Bonhoeffer to abstain from any ecumenical activity not directly authorized by Berlin, Bonhoeffer refused to abstain.

=== Underground seminaries ===
In 1935, Bonhoeffer was offered a coveted opportunity to study non-violent resistance under Mahatma Gandhi in his ashram. However, remembering Barth's rebuke, Bonhoeffer decided to return to Germany instead, where he was the head at an underground seminary in Finkenwalde for training Confessing Church pastors. As the Nazi suppression of the Confessing Church intensified, Barth was driven back to Switzerland in 1935; Niemöller was arrested in July 1937; and in August 1936, Bonhoeffer's authorization to teach at the University of Berlin was revoked after he was denounced as a "pacifist and enemy of the state" by Theodor Heckel.

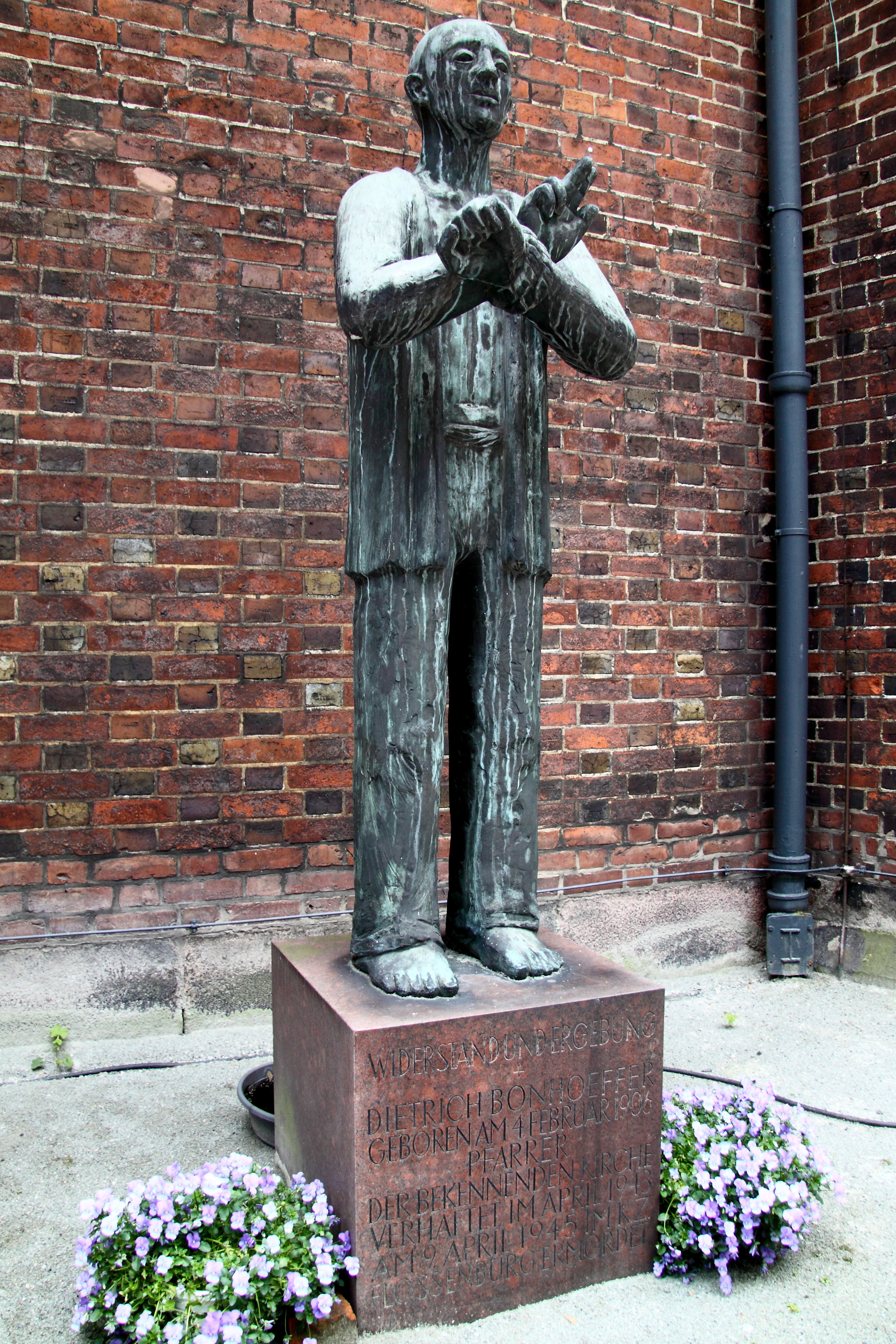
Memorial of Bonhoeffer in front of St. Peter's Church, Hamburg

Bonhoeffer's efforts on behalf of the underground seminaries included securing necessary funds. He found a great benefactor in Ruth von Kleist-Retzow. In times of trouble, Bonhoeffer's former students and their wives would take refuge in von Kleist-Retzow's Pomeranian estate, and Bonhoeffer was a frequent guest. Later he fell in love with Kleist-Retzow's granddaughter, Maria von Wedemeyer, to whom he became engaged three months before his arrest in 1943. By August 1937, SS leader Heinrich Himmler had decreed the education and examination of Confessing Church ministry candidates illegal. In September 1937, the Gestapo closed the seminary at Finkenwalde, and by November twenty-seven pastors and former students were arrested. It was around this time that Bonhoeffer published his best-known book, The Cost of Discipleship, a study on the Sermon on the Mount in which he attacked "cheap grace" as a cover for ethical laxity against the virtues of "costly grace".

Bonhoeffer spent the next two years secretly traveling from one eastern German village to another to conduct a "seminary on the run," supervising the continuing education and work of his students, most of whom were working illegally in small parishes within the old-Prussian Ecclesiastical Province of Pomerania. The von Blumenthal family hosted the underground seminary on its estate of Groß Schlönwitz. The pastors of Groß Schlönwitz and neighbouring villages supported the education of young men who voluntarily housed these seminarians (among whom was Eberhard Bethge, who later became his best friend and edited Bonhoeffer's Letters and Papers from Prison) and employing them as vicars in their congregations.

In 1938, the Gestapo banned Bonhoeffer from Berlin. In the summer of 1939, the seminary was able to move to Sigurdshof, an outlying estate (Vorwerk) of the von Kleist family in Wendisch Tychow. In March 1940, the Gestapo shut down the underground seminary there following the outbreak of World War II. Bonhoeffer's semi-monastic communal life and teaching at the underground Finkenwalde seminary formed the basis of his books, The Cost of Discipleship and Life Together.

Bonhoeffer's sister Sabine, along with her Jewish-classified husband Gerhard Leibholz and their two daughters, escaped to England by way of Switzerland in 1938.

=== Return to the United States ===
In February 1938, Bonhoeffer made an initial contact with members of the German resistance when his brother-in-law Hans von Dohnányi introduced him to a group seeking Hitler's overthrow at the Abwehr, the German military intelligence service.

Bonhoeffer learned from Dohnányi that war was imminent. He was particularly troubled by the prospect of being conscripted. As a committed Christian pacifist opposed to the Nazi regime, he refused to swear an oath to Hitler, commit violence, or fight in Hitler's army, though such refusal was potentially a capital offense. He worried about consequences refusing military service could have for the Confessing Church, as it was a move that would be frowned upon by most nationalist Christians and their churches at the time.

It was at this juncture that Bonhoeffer left for the United States in June 1939 at the invitation of Union Theological Seminary in New York. After much inner turmoil, he soon regretted his decision and returned after only two weeks, despite strong pressure from his friends to remain in the United States. He wrote to Reinhold Niebuhr:

I have come to the conclusion that I made a mistake in coming to America this time. I must live through this difficult period in our national history along with the people of Germany. I will have no right to participate in the reconstruction of Christian life in Germany after the war if I do not share the trials of this time with my people ... Christians in Germany will have to face the terrible alternative of either willing the defeat of their nation in order that a future Christian civilization may survive, or else willing the victory of their nation and thereby destroying our civilization and any true Christianity. I know which of these alternatives I must choose but I cannot make that choice from a place of security.

=== Abwehr agent ===
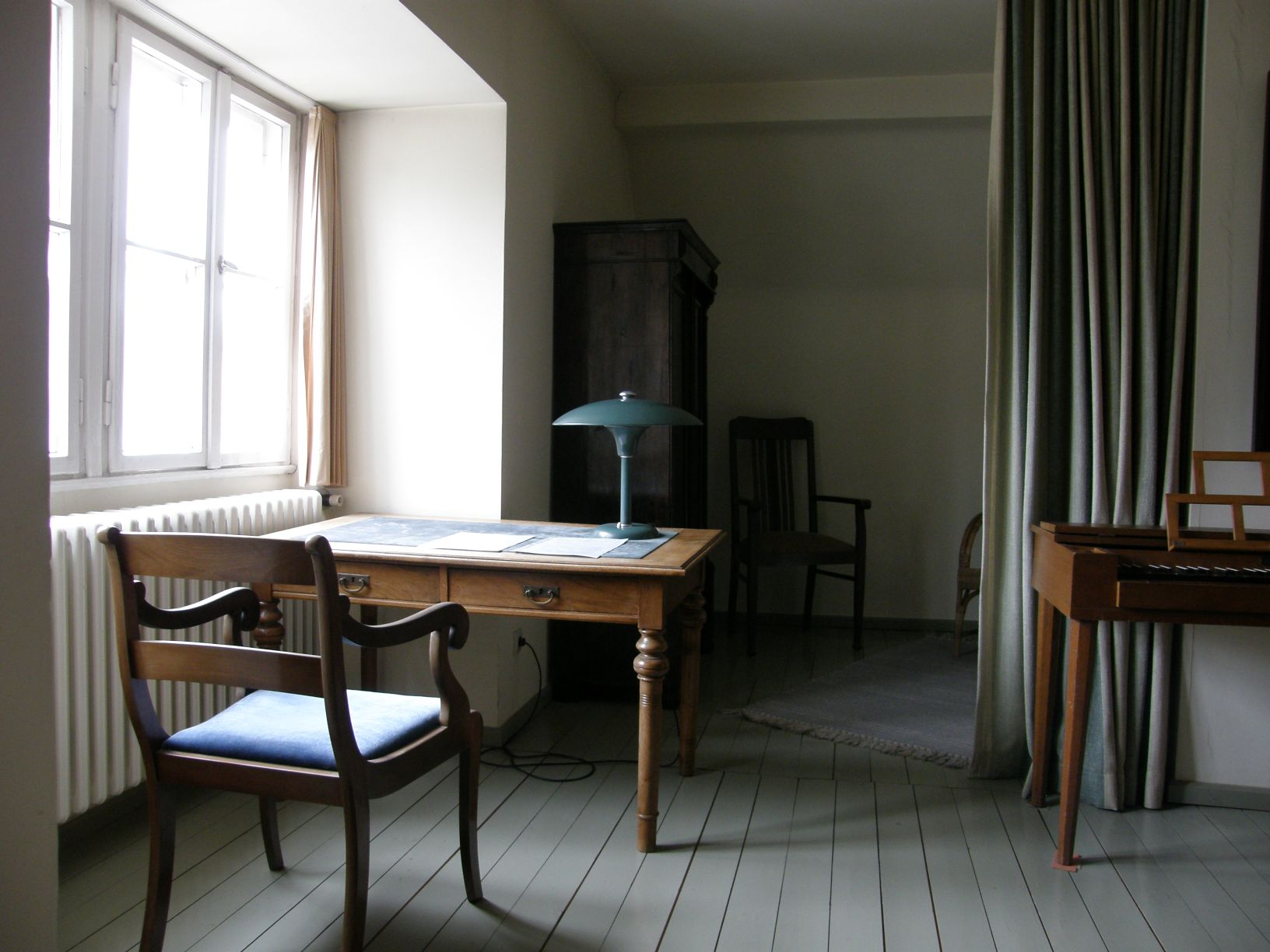
Bonhoeffer's study

Back in Germany, Bonhoeffer was further harassed by the Nazi authorities, as he was forbidden to speak in public and was required regularly to report his activities to the police. In 1941, he was forbidden to print or to publish anything. In the meantime, Bonhoeffer had joined the Abwehr. Dohnányi, already part of the Abwehr, brought him into the organization on the claim that his wide ecumenical contacts would be of use to Germany, thus protecting him from conscription to active service. Bonhoeffer presumably knew about various 1943 plots against Hitler through Dohnányi, who was actively involved in the planning. Bonhoeffer had advocated for nonviolent resistance and conscientious objection, and been clear in his radio addresses and in his writing.

In the face of Nazi atrocities against the Jews and other minorities, the full scale of which Bonhoeffer learned through the Abwehr, some read back into his work that he concluded that "the ultimate question for a responsible man to ask is not how he is to extricate himself from this whole affair, but how the coming generation shall continue to survive and live for Truth." He did not justify his action but wrote, "When a man takes guilt upon himself in responsibility, he imputes his guilt to himself and no one else. He answers for it... Before other men he is justified by dire necessity; before himself he is acquitted by his conscience, but before God he hopes only for grace." (In a 1932 sermon, Bonhoeffer said, "The blood of martyrs might once again be demanded, but this blood, if we really have the courage and loyalty to shed it, will not be innocent, shining like that of the first witnesses for the faith. On our blood lies heavy with guilt, the guilt of the unprofitable servant who is cast into outer darkness." Despite ways that this is quoted as supporting assassination, Bonhoeffer also advocated for conscientious objection against conscription in 1935.) The quotes in support of his participation in plots are retrospective, assuming his own involvement as his friend, Eberhard Bethge, asserted rather than the reality about which he wrote often: The seminarians he had taught were actively involved in fighting for Hitler; they had written to him about participating in atrocities such as the killing of surrendered soldiers. Historian Victoria J. Barnett supported the conclusion that Bonhoeffer endorsed the overthrow of the Nazi regime and that he understood that this would involve Hitler's assassination.

Under cover of the Abwehr, Bonhoeffer served as a courier for the German resistance movement to reveal its existence and intentions to the Western Allies in hope of garnering their support. Through his ecumenical contacts abroad, he hoped to secure possible peace terms with the Allies for a post-Hitler government. In May 1942, he met Anglican Bishop George Bell of Chichester, a member of the House of Lords and an ally of the Confessing Church, contacted by Bonhoeffer's exiled brother-in-law Leibholz; through him feelers were sent to British Foreign Secretary Anthony Eden. However, the British government ignored these, as it had all other approaches from the German resistance, considering all Germans to be the enemy. In addition, British war policy was to conduct area bombing of civilian cities, which Bell opposed, a view that had become unpopular in Britain. Dohnányi and Bonhoeffer were also involved in Abwehr operations to help German Jews escape to Switzerland – again, the actual stated reason for his arrest. During this time, Bonhoeffer worked on his book Ethics and wrote letters to keep up the spirits of his former students. He intended Ethics as his magnum opus, but it remained unfinished when he was arrested. On 5 April 1943, Bonhoeffer and Dohnányi were arrested and imprisoned. The judge in the trial was especially angry that Bonhoeffer had successfully avoided serving in the military by working for the Abwehr, something cited in the court documents.

=== Imprisonment ===
On 13 January 1943 Bonhoeffer had become engaged to Maria von Wedemeyer, the granddaughter of his close friend and Finkenwalde seminary supporter, Ruth von Kleist Retzow. Ruth had campaigned for this marriage for several years, although up until late October 1942, Bonhoeffer remained a reluctant suitor despite Ruth being part of his innermost circle. He considered that his responsibilities during wartime made it the wrong time to marry. A large age gap loomed between Bonhoeffer and Maria: he was 36 to her 18. Bonhoeffer had first met her when she was his confirmation student at age 11. As was considered proper at the time, the two had spent almost no time together alone prior to the engagement and did not see each other between becoming engaged and Bonhoeffer's arrest on 5 April, three months later. Once he was in prison, however, Maria's status as his fiancée became invaluable, as it meant she could visit Bonhoeffer and correspond with him. While their relationship was troubled, she was a source of food and smuggled messages. Bonhoeffer made Eberhard Bethge his heir, but Maria, in allowing her correspondence with Bonhoeffer to be published after her death, provided an invaluable addition to this scholarship.

For a year and a half, Bonhoeffer was imprisoned at Tegel Prison awaiting trial. There he continued his work in religious outreach among his fellow prisoners and guards. Sympathetic guards helped smuggle his letters out of prison to Bethge and others, and these uncensored letters were posthumously published in Letters and Papers from Prison. One of those guards, a corporal named Knobloch, even offered to help him escape from the prison and "disappear" with him, and plans were made for that end; eventually Bonhoeffer declined it, fearing Nazi retribution against his family, especially his brother Klaus and brother-in-law Dohnányi, who was also imprisoned.

Notes on Bonhoeffer's intelligence activities and ecumenical contacts featured among the contents of the Zossen documents uncovered by the Gestapo on 22 September 1944; this fact, combined with his familial connection to Dohnanyi, sealed Bonhoeffer's fate and led directly to his transfer to Gestapo headquarters on the Prinz-Albrecht-Straße.

On 4 April 1945, the bulk of the diary belonging to Admiral Wilhelm Canaris, head of the Abwehr, was also discovered, and in a rage upon reading them, Hitler ordered that the other Abwehr members be executed. Bonhoeffer was led away just as he concluded his final Sunday service and asked an English prisoner, Payne Best, to convey a message to Bishop Bell if Best should ever reach his home: "This is the end—but for me it is the beginning of Life!"

== Execution ==
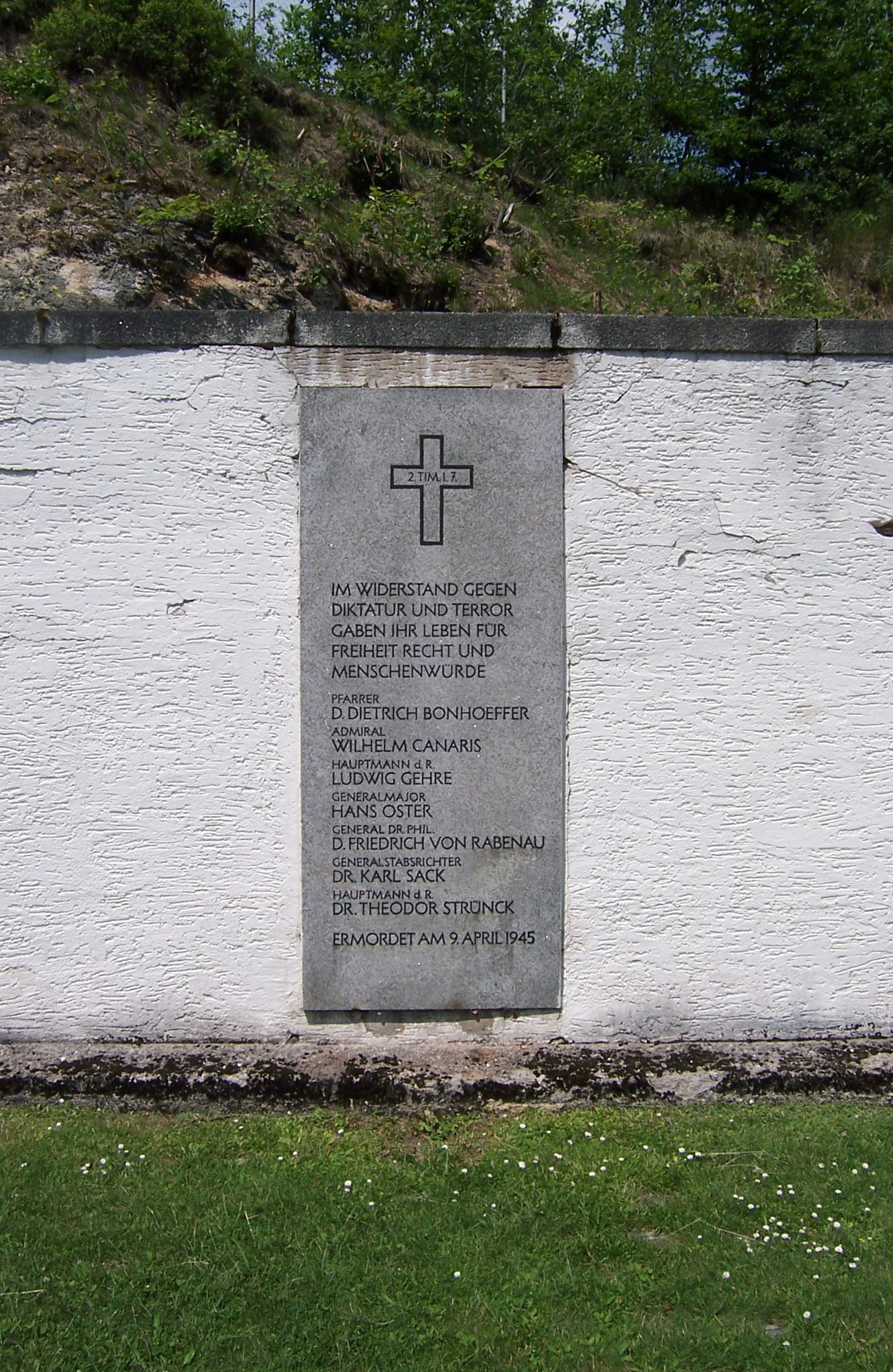
Flossenbürg concentration camp, Arrestblock-Hof: Memorial to members of German resistance executed on 9 April 1945

Bonhoeffer was sentenced to death on 8 April 1945 by SS judge Otto Thorbeck at a drumhead court-martial without witnesses, without any evidence against him, with no records of the proceedings or a defense. He was executed in Flossenbürg concentration camp by hanging at dawn on 9 April 1945. Bonhoeffer was stripped of his clothing and led naked into the execution yard where he was hanged with five others: Canaris; General Hans Oster, Canaris's deputy; General Karl Sack, a military jurist; lawyer Theodor Strünck; and German resistance fighter Ludwig Gehre.

Eberhard Bethge, a student and close friend of Bonhoeffer, writes of a man who saw the execution:

I saw Pastor Bonhoeffer... kneeling on the floor praying fervently to God. I was most deeply moved by the way this lovable man prayed, so devout and so certain that God heard his prayer. At the place of execution, he again said a short prayer and then climbed the few steps to the gallows, brave and composed. His death ensued after a few seconds. In the almost fifty years that I worked as a doctor, I have hardly ever seen a man die so entirely submissive to the will of God.

This historical account of Bonhoeffer's death went unchallenged over the following decades. However, several recent biographers see problems with the story because Bethge's witness, Hermann Fischer-Hüllstrung, was a doctor at Flossenbürg concentration camp. J.L.F. Mogensen, a former prisoner at Flossenbürg, cited the length of time it took for the execution to be completed (almost six hours), plus departures from camp procedure that may not have been granted to prisoners so late in the war, as jarring inconsistencies. Considering that the sentences had been confirmed at the highest levels of Nazi government, by individuals with a pattern of torturing prisoners who dared to challenge the regime, Craig J. Slane posits that "the physical details of Bonhoeffer's death may have been much more difficult than we earlier had imagined."

Other recent critics of the traditional account are more caustic. It also appears in some instances that "Fischer-Hüllstrung had been given the job of reviving political prisoners after they had been hanged until they were almost dead, in order to prolong the agony of their dying." Another critic charges that Fischer-Hüllstrung's "subsequent statement about Bonhoeffer as kneeling in wordy prayer ... belongs to the realm of legend," although without evidence to the contrary.

The disposition of Bonhoeffer's remains is not known. His body may have been cremated outside the camp along with hundreds of other recently executed or dead prisoners, or American troops may have placed his body in one of several mass graves in which they interred the unburied dead of the camp.

== Legacy ==
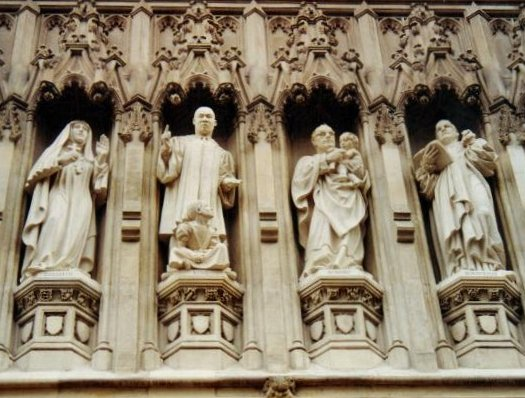
Gallery of 20th Century Martyrs at Westminster Abbey. From left, Mother Elizabeth of Russia, Martin Luther King Jr., Óscar Romero and Bonhoeffer.

Bonhoeffer is commemorated in the liturgical calendars of several Christian denominations on the anniversary of his death, 9 April. This includes many parts of the Anglican Communion, where he is sometimes identified as a martyr and other times not. His commemoration in the liturgical calendar of the Evangelical Lutheran Church in America uses the liturgical color of white, which is typically used for non-martyred saints. In 2008, the General Conference of the United Methodist Church, which does not enumerate saints, officially recognized Bonhoeffer as a "modern-day martyr". He was the first martyr to be so recognized who lived after the Reformation and is one of only two as of 2017. Bonhoeffer is remembered in the Church of England with a commemoration on 9 April.

The Deutsche Evangelische Kirche in Sydenham, London, at which he preached between 1933 and 1935, was destroyed by bombing in 1944. A replacement church was built in 1958 and named Dietrich-Bonhoeffer-Kirche in his honor.

Dietrich Bonhoeffer's text "Von guten Mächten" (translated as 'By Gentle' or 'By Gracious Powers') is known to a large audience as a worship song. The song is often sung at funerals. In 2021 it was voted the most popular hymn in Germany. The best-known melody was written by Siegfried Fietz in 1970.

=== Theological legacy ===
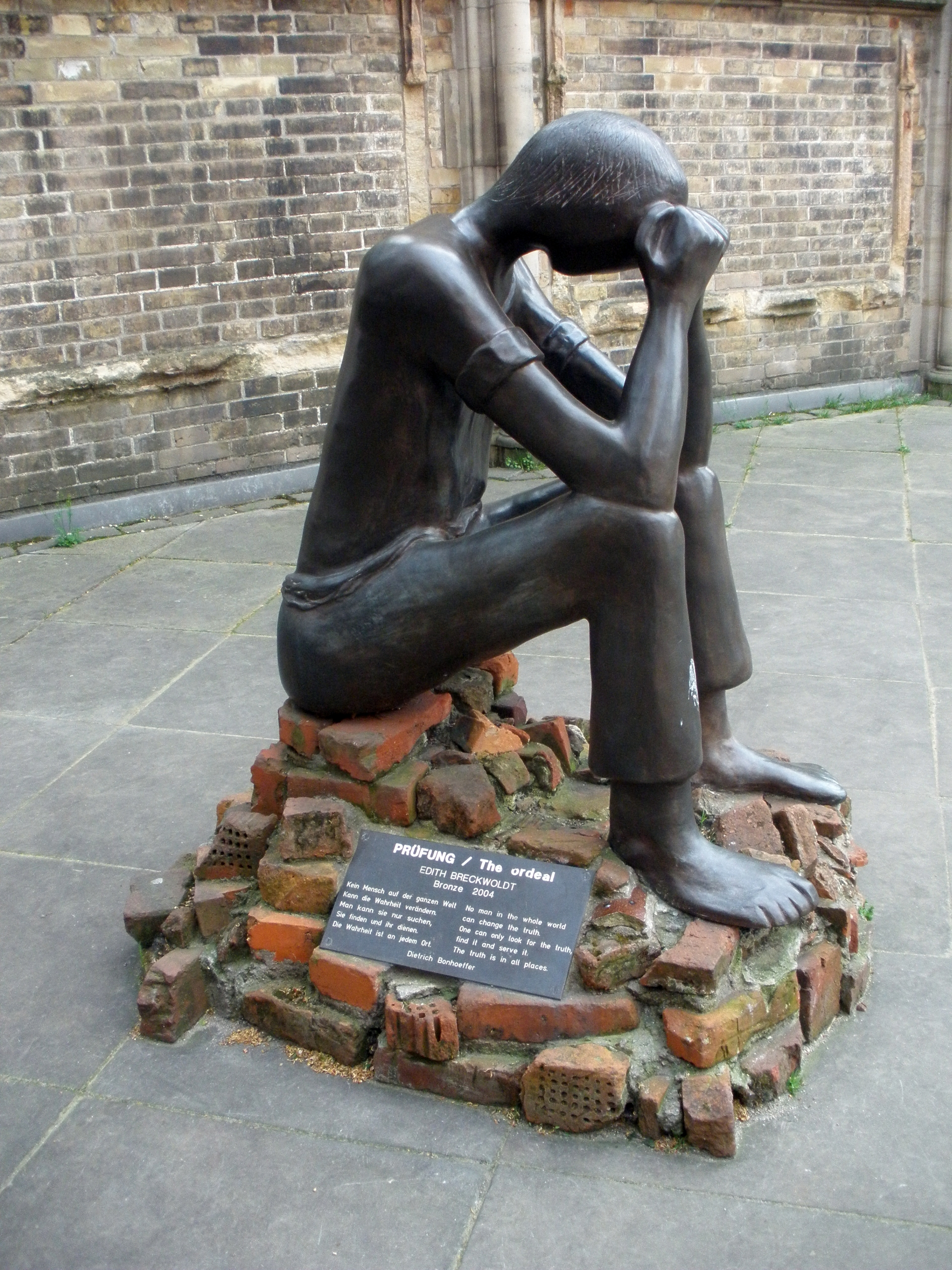
Sculpture by Edith Breckwoldt, with a citation by Bonhoeffer: "The ordeal. No man in the whole world can change the truth. One can only look for the truth, find it and serve it. The truth is in all places."

Bonhoeffer's theology is subject to diverse interpretations, sometimes based on speculation. For example, while his Christocentric approach appeals to conservative, confession-minded Protestants, other commentators note his commitment to justice, and ideas about "religionless Christianity". He also argued that Christians should not retreat from the world but act within it. He believed that two elements were constitutive of faith: the implementation of justice and the acceptance of divine suffering.

His book The Cost of Discipleship discusses the concept of cheap grace, as opposed to costly grace. He contends that Christians have relied so much on Christ's forgiveness that they do not challenge themselves enough in actually following his word to the best of their ability, instead relying on God's grace to save them when they fall. Bonhoeffer says that Christians are instructed to strive to follow the Word of God. Only then—after they strive to the best of their ability—should God's grace come into play. He contrasts cheap grace with costly grace, writing:

Cheap grace is the grace we bestow on ourselves. Cheap grace is the preaching of forgiveness without requiring repentance, baptism without church discipline, Communion without confession, absolution without personal confession. Cheap grace is grace without discipleship, grace without the cross, grace without Jesus Christ, living and incarnate. [...] Costly grace is the gospel which must be sought again and again, the gift which must be asked for, the door at which a man must knock. Such grace is costly because it calls us to follow, and it is grace because it calls us to follow Jesus Christ. It is costly because it costs a man his life, and it is grace because it gives a man the only true life. It is costly because it condemns sin, and grace because it justifies the sinner. Above all, it is costly because it cost God the life of his Son [...]

Continuing with this idea, Bonhoeffer discusses the idea of simple obedience. He admonishes Christians who come too quickly to the conclusion that God could not possibly have meant his commands literally. Bonhoeffer cites the example of the rich man who asks Jesus how he can enter the kingdom of heaven. He writes that people often simply assume that Jesus did not mean literally to leave everything and follow him and that instead it was a matter of faith or a command to be inwardly detached. Bonhoeffer writes that God says exactly what he means and that Christians need to follow simple obedience to him by following divine commands as they are written. He writes "only he who believes is obedient, and only he who is obedient believes".

Years after Bonhoeffer's death, some, such as Protestant theologian Thomas Altizer and Jewish religious scholar Richard L. Rubenstein, developed his critique into a thoroughgoing attack against traditional Christianity in the "Death of God" movement, which briefly attracted the attention of the mainstream culture in the mid-1960s. However, some critics, such as Jacques Ellul, have charged that those radical interpretations of Bonhoeffer's insights amount to a grave distortion, that Bonhoeffer did not mean to say that God no longer had anything to do with humanity and had become a mere cultural artifact. More recent Bonhoeffer interpretations are more cautious in this regard, respecting the parameters of the neo-orthodox school to which he belonged. Bonhoeffer also influenced the Comboni missionary Father Ezechiele Ramin.

=== Theory of stupidity ===
Bonhoeffer wrote an essay titled "After Ten Years" in December 1942, which was later published in Letters and Papers from Prison. In it, he argued that stupidity was a greater enemy of the good than malice. He saw stupidity as different from a lack of intelligence, describing it as a problem shaped by social circumstances. Bonhoeffer believed that displays of political or religious power could lead people to stop thinking for themselves, often without realizing it. He believed that overcoming stupidity required liberation, not just instruction, and that external freedom generally had to come before the inner freedom needed to live responsibly before God. In more recent years, Bonhoeffer's argument has become known as his theory of stupidity.

== Portrayals in media ==
=== Books ===
==== Non-fiction ====
- Bethge, E.; Barnett, V.J. (1999). Dietrich Bonhoeffer: A Biography. Fortress Press. ISBN 978-1-4514-0742-6.
- Marsh, Charles (2014). Strange glory: a life of Dietrich Bonhoeffer. New York: Knopf. ISBN 978-0-307-26981-2.
- Schlingensiepen, Ferdinand (2010). Dietrich Bonhoeffer, 1906–1945: Martyr, Thinker, Man of Resistance. T&T Clark. ISBN 978-0-7735-1531-4.
- Root, A. (2014). Bonhoeffer as Youth Worker: A Theological Vision for Discipleship and Life Together. Baker Publishing Group. ISBN 978-1-4412-2131-5.
- Eberhard Bethge, Dietrich Bonhoeffer: Theologian, Christian, Man for His Times: A Biography, rev. ed. (Minneapolis, Fortress Press, 2000)
- Trey Palmisano (author), Reinhard Krauss (foreword), Peace and Violence in the Ethics of Dietrich Bonhoeffer: An Analysis of Method (Wipf & Stock, 2016). ISBN 978-1-4982-8772-2
- Diane Reynolds, The Doubled Life of Dietrich Bonhoeffer (Wipf & Stock, 2016)
- Keith Clements, Bonhoeffer and Britain (Churches Together in Britain and Ireland, 2006). ISBN 978-0-85169-307-1
- DeJonge, Michael P. (2012), Bonhoeffer's Theological Formation: Berlin, Barth, and Protestant Theology, Oxford University Press, ISBN 978-0-19-963978-6
- DeJonge, Michael P. (2017), Bonhoeffer's Reception of Luther, Oxford University Press, ISBN 978-0-19-879790-6
- DeJonge, Michael P. (2018), Bonhoeffer on Resistance: The Word against the Wheel, Oxford University Press, ISBN 978-0-19-882417-6
- Frick, Peter, ed. (2008), Bonhoeffer's Intellectual Formation: Theology and Philosophy in His Thought, Mohr Siebeck, ISBN 978-3-16-149535-9
- Donald Goddard, The Last Days of Dietrich Bonhoeffer, Harper and Roe,1976, ISBN 978-0-06-011564-7
- Stephen R. Haynes,The Bonhoeffer Legacy: Post-Holocaust Perspectives (Fortress Press, 2006). ISBN 978-0-8006-3815-3.
- Geffrey B. Kelly & F. Burton Nelson (editors), A Testament to Freedom: The Essential Writings of Dietrich Bonhoeffer (Harper San Francisco, 1990) ISBN 978-0-06-060813-2
- Michael J. Martin, Dietrich Bonhoeffer. Champion of Freedom series. (Morgan Reynolds Publishing, 2012). ISBN 978-1-59935-169-8. Winner of 2013 Wilbur Award for Best Book, Youth Audiences.
- John W. Matthews, Bonhoeffer: A Brief Overview of the Life and Writings of Dietrich Bonhoeffer (Lutheran University Press, 2011)
- John McCabe, Dietrich Bonhoeffer – The Last Eight Days (Baylor University Press, 2024) ISBN 978-1-4813-2167-9
- John McCabe, Acht Tage im April – Dietrich Bonhoeffers letzter Weg nach Flossenbürg Trans. Thomas Görden (Gütersloher Verlagshaus, 2025) ISBN 978-3-57908257-8
- John A. Moses, The Reluctant Revolutionary: Dietrich Bonhoeffer's Collision with Prusso-German History (New York/Oxford: Berghahn, 2009)
- Metaxas, Eric, Bonhoeffer: Pastor, Martyr, Prophet, Spy. (Nashville: Thomas Nelson, 2010.) ISBN 978-1-59555-138-2.
- Nation, Mark Thiessen; Siegrist, Anthony G.; Umbel, Daniel P. (2013). Bonhoeffer the Assassin? Challenging the Myth, Recovering His Call to Peacemaking. Baker Grand Rapids. ISBN 978-0-8010-3961-4.
- Plant, Stephen (2004), Bonhoeffer, Continuum International Publishing, ISBN 978-0-8264-5089-0.
- Robertson, Edwin (1987), The Shame and the Sacrifice: The Life and Teaching of Dietrich Bonhoeffer, Hodder & Stoughton, ISBN 978-0-340-41063-9.
- Robertson, Edwin (1989), Bonhoeffer's Legacy: The Christian Way in a World Without Religion, Collier Books, ISBN 978-0-02-036372-9.
- Schlingensiepen, Ferdinand (2012), Dietrich Bonhoeffer 1906-1945, Martyr, Thinker, Man of Resistance, Bloomsbury, ISBN 978-0-567-49319-4.
- Kenneth Slack. George Bell. S.C.M. Press, 1971. ISBN 978-0-334-00093-8.
- Reggie L. Williams, Bonhoeffer's Black Jesus: Harlem Renaissance Theology and an Ethic of Resistance (Baylor University Press, 2014). ISBN 978-1-60258-805-9
- Valentin Jeutner, The Sovereign Human Being: Carl Schmitt, Dietrich Bonhoeffer and Responsible Decision-Making (Bloomsbury/T&T Clark, 2024). ISBN 978-0-567-71704-7

==== Fiction ====
- Denise Giardina, Saints and Villains (Ballantine Books, 1999). ISBN 978-0-449-00427-2. A Fictional Account of Bonhoeffer's life.
- Mary Glazener, The Cup of Wrath: The Story of Dietrich Bonhoeffer's Resistance to Hitler (Frederic C. Beil, 1992). ISBN 978-0-913720-71-4.
- Daniel Jándula, El Reo (Tarragona: Ediciones Noufront, 2009). ISBN 978-84-937017-0-3
- George Mackay Brown, Magnus (Hogarth Press, 1973)
- Simon Perry, All Who Came Before (Wipf and Stock, 2011)
- Elizabeth Strout, Abide with me (Simon and Schuster UK Ltd 2006)
- Jack Saarela, Love Out of Reach (Can't Put it Down Books 2019). ISBN 978-0-9994623-5-5

=== Films ===
- Dr. John F. Boogaert, director (1978), Bonhoeffer, A Life of Challenge, US: Panagraph.
- Beller, Hava Kohav (1991). "The Restless Conscience". US. Archived from the original on 14 January 2016..
- A View From The Underside – The Legacy of Dietrich Bonhoeffer – Al Staggs, 1992
- Hanged on a Twisted Cross (1996) T.N. Mohan, 1996
- Bonhoeffer: Agent of Grace (2000) Eric Till, PBS, 2000
- Bonhoeffer – Martin Doblmeier, 2003
- "Come Before Winter" (2016) Produced by Dr. Gary Blount, directed by Kevin Ekvall.
- Bonhoeffer and the Third Reich (2023).
- Bonhoeffer (2024) distributed by Angel Studios. Written and directed by Todd Komarnicki.

=== Plays ===
- Lies, Love and Hitler – an Australian play written by Elizabeth Avery Scott. Premiered 2010 at The Street Theatre, Canberra, Australia (directed by P.J. Williams).
- Bonhoeffer – a play written and performed by South African playwright, actor and human rights activist Peter Krummeck (directed by Christopher Weare) and premiered at Capitol Hill in Washington DC during the week commemorating the First Anniversary of 9/11.
- Bonhoeffer – an American play by Tim Jorgenson, available in a print edition (Xulon Press, 2002 ISBN 978-1-59160-343-6), premiered in 2004 at the Acacia Theatre Company, Milwaukee, Wisconsin.
- Bonhoeffer – a Finnish monologue play written and performed by Timo Kankainen and directed by Eija-Irmeli Lahti, premiered in January 2008 at the Seinäjoki city theatre.
- Personal Honor: Suggested by the Life of Dietrich Bonhoeffer – by Nancy Axelrad and performed by the Ricks-Weil Theatre Company (directed by Thom Johnson), premiered 1 May 2009 at the H.J. Ricks Centre for the Arts in Greenfield, Indiana.
- The Beams are Creaking – an American play by Douglas Anderson, Baker's Plays, Boston (ISBN 978-0-87440-963-5). Premiered at Case Western University in October 1978. Won the Marc A. Klein Playwright Award and Wichita State National Playwright Competition that same year.
- Bonhoeffer's Cost – Mary Ruth Clarke with Timothy Gregory, presented by Provision Theatre, Chicago, 17 September – 30 October 2011.
- True Patriot – BBC2 Play of the Week (TV Series) (1977) Director Ronald Wilson. Written by Don Shaw. Michael York plays Bonhoeffer. Notable for ending with incomplete execution scene made to resemble Nazi film such as those known to have been made of the executions of actual and accused participants in the 20 July Bomb Plot, such as Bonhoeffer; Beethoven's Sonata No. 8 Op. 13 (Pathetique) Adagio cantabile accompanies the final scene.

=== Choral theater ===
- "Bonhoeffer" – a choral theater piece by Thomas Lloyd, with text adapted from the writings of Dietrich Bonhoeffer and Maria von Wedemeyer. Premiered 10 March 2013 at the Philadelphia Episcopal Cathedral (performed by the chamber choir "The Crossing" conducted by Donald Nally).
- Peter Janssens composed a musical play ("Musikspiel") Dietrich Bonhoeffer in 1995 on a text by Priska Beilharz.

=== Verse about Bonhoeffer ===
- "Friday's Child" reading by W.H. Auden, 1958

=== Opera ===
- Bonhoeffer Ann Gebuhr, 2000

=== Oratorios ===
- Bonhoeffer-Oratorium – composed from 1988 to 1992 by Tom Johnson for orchestra, soloists, and choir
- Ende und Anfang – composed in 2006 by Gerhard Kaufmann for orchestra, soloists, and choir and based on the writings of Bonhoeffer

=== Songs ===
- "Dietrich Bonhoeffer," by the band The Chairman Dances

=== Radio ===
- Focus on the Family Radio Theatre produced a dramatized radio show depicting Bonhoeffer's life starring Brian Deacon as Bonhoeffer.

== Writings ==
English translations of Bonhoeffer's works, most of which were originally written in German, are available. Many of his lectures and books were translated into English over the years and are available from multiple publishers. These works are listed following the Fortress Press edition of Bonhoeffer's writings.

All sixteen volumes of the English Bonhoeffer Works Edition of Bonhoeffer's Oeuvre had been published by October 2013. A volume of selected readings entitled The Dietrich Bonhoeffer Reader which presents a chronological view of Bonhoeffer's theological development became available by 1 November 2013.

Fortress Press editions of Bonhoeffer's works

- Sanctorum Communio. Dietrich Bonhoeffer Works, Volume 1. Dietrich Bonhoeffer; Clifford Green, Editor Translated by Reinhard Krauss and Nancy Lukens. Hardcover, 392 pp; ISBN 978-0-8006-8301-6 and paperback, 386 pp; ISBN 978-0-8006-9652-8. Bonhoeffer's dissertation, completed in 1927 and first published in 1930 as Sanctorum Communio: eine Dogmatische Untersuchung zur Soziologie der Kirche. In it, he attempts to work out a theology of the person in society, and particularly in the church. Along with explaining his early positions on sin, evil, solidarity, collective spirit, and collective guilt, it unfolds a systematic theology of the Spirit at work in the church and what it implies for questions on authority, freedom, ritual, and eschatology.
- Act and Being. Dietrich Bonhoeffer Works, Volume 2. Dietrich Bonhoeffer; Wayne Whitson Floyd and Hans Richard Reuter, Editors; Translated by H. Martin Rumscheidt. Hardcover, 256 pp: ISBN 978-0-8006-8302-3. Bonhoeffer's second dissertation, written in 1929–1930 and published in 1931 as Akt und Sein, deals with the consciousness and conscience in theology from the perspective of the Reformation's insight into the origin sinfulness in the "heart turned in upon itself and thus open neither to the revelation of God nor to the encounter with the neighbor." Bonhoeffer's thoughts about power, revelation, Otherness, theological method, and theological anthropology are explained.
- Creation and Fall. Dietrich Bonhoeffer Works, Volume 3. Dietrich Bonhoeffer; John W. De Gruchy, Editor Translated by Douglas Stephen Bax. In 1932, Bonhoeffer called on his students at the University of Berlin to focus their attention on the word of God, the word of truth, in a time of turmoil. Hardcover, 214 pp: ISBN 978-0-8006-8303-0. Paper, 224 pp: ISBN 978-0-8006-8323-8.
- Discipleship. Dietrich Bonhoeffer Works, Volume 4. Dietrich Bonhoeffer; John D. Dodsey and Geffrey B. Kelly, Editors. Originally published in 1937, this book (generally known in English by the title The Cost of Discipleship) soon became a classic exposition of what it means to follow Christ in a modern world beset by a dangerous and criminal government. Hardcover, 384 pp: ISBN 978-0-8006-8304-7. Paper, 354 pp: ISBN 978-0-8006-8324-5.
- Life Together and Prayerbook of the Bible. Dietrich Bonhoeffer Works, Volume 5. Dietrich Bonhoeffer; James H. Burtness and Geffrey B. Kelly, Editors; Translated by Daniel W. Bloesch. Hardcover, 242 pp: ISBN 978-0-8006-8305-4. Paper, 232 pp: ISBN 978-0-8006-8325-2. Life Together is a classic which contains Bonhoeffer's meditation on the nature of the Christian community. Prayerbook of the Bible is a classic meditation on the importance of the Psalms for Christian prayer. In this theological interpretation of the Psalms, Bonhoeffer describes the moods of an individual's relationship with God and also the turns of love and heartbreak, of joy and sorrow, that are themselves the Christian community's path to God.
- Ethics. Dietrich Bonhoeffer Works, Volume 6. Dietrich Bonhoeffer; Clifford Green, Editor; Translated by Reinhard Krauss, Douglas W. Stott, and Charles C. West. Despite remaining incomplete at the time of Bonhoeffer's execution, this book is central to understanding Bonhoeffer's body of work. Ethics is the culmination of his theological and personal odyssey. Hardcover, 544 pp: ISBN 978-0-8006-8306-1. Paperback, 605 pp: ISBN 978-0-8006-8326-9.
- Fiction from Tegel Prison. Dietrich Bonhoeffer Works, Volume 7. Dietrich Bonhoeffer; Clifford Green, Editor Translated by Nancy Lukens. Hardcover, 288 pp: ISBN 978-0-8006-8307-8. Writing fiction—an incomplete drama, a novel fragment, and a short story—occupied much of Bonhoeffer's first year in Tegel prison, as well as writing to his family and his fiancée and dealing with his interrogation. "There is a good deal of autobiography mixed in with it," he explained to his friend and biographer Eberhard Bethge. Richly annotated by German editors Renate Bethge and Ilse Todt and by Clifford Green, the writings in this book disclose a great deal of Bonhoeffer's family context, social world, and cultural milieu. Events from his life are recounted in a way that illuminates his theology. Characters and situations that represent Nazi types and attitudes became a form of social criticism and help to explain Bonhoeffer's participation in the resistance movement and the plot to kill Hitler.
- Letters and Papers from Prison. Dietrich Bonhoeffer Works, Volume 8. Dietrich Bonhoeffer; John W. de Gruchy, Editor; Translated by Isabel Best; Lisa E. Dahill; Reinhard Krauss; Nancy Lukens. This splendid volume, in many ways the capstone of the Dietrich Bonhoeffer Works, is the first unabridged collection of Bonhoeffer's 1943–1945 prison letters and theological writings. Here are over 200 documents that include extensive correspondence with his family and Eberhard Bethge (much of it in English for the first time), as well as his theological notes, and his prison poems. The volume offers an illuminating introduction by editor John de Gruchy and a historical Afterword by the editors of the original German volume: Christian Gremmels, Eberhard Bethge, and Renate Bethge. Hardcover, 800 pp: ISBN 978-0-8006-9703-7.
- The Young Bonhoeffer, 1918–1927. Dietrich Bonhoeffer Works, Volume 9. Dietrich Bonhoeffer; Paul Duane Metheny, Editor. Gathers Bonhoeffer's 100 earliest letters and journals from after the First World War through his graduation from Berlin University. Hardcover, 720 pp: ISBN 978-0-8006-8309-2. This work gathers his earliest letters and journals through his graduation from Berlin University. It also contains his early theological writings up to his dissertation. The seventeen essays include works on the patristic period for Adolf von Harnack, on Luther's moods for Karl Holl, on biblical interpretation for Professor Reinhold Seeberg, as well as essays on the church and eschatology, reason and revelation, Job, John, and even joy. Rounding out this picture of Bonhoeffer's nascent theology are his sermons from the period, along with his lectures on homiletics, catechesis, and practical theology.
- Barcelona, Berlin, New York: 1928–1931. Dietrich Bonhoeffer Works, Volume 10. Dietrich Bonhoeffer; Clifford Green, Editor. This period from 1928 to 1931, which followed the completion of his dissertation, was formative for Bonhoeffer's personal, pastoral, and theological direction. Hardcover, 790 pp: ISBN 978-0-8006-8330-6.
- Ecumenical, Academic and Pastoral Work: 1931–1932, Dietrich Bonhoeffer's Works, Volume 11, is a translation of Ökumene, Universität, Pfarramt: 1931–1932. Hardcover, 576 pp: ISBN 978-0-8006-9838-6.
- Berlin: 1932–1933. Dietrich Bonhoeffer Works, Volume 12. Dietrich Bonhoeffer; Larry L. Rasmussen, Editor. Translated by Isabel Best, David Higgins, and Douglas W. Stott. Berlin documents the crisis of 1933 in Germany as Bonhoeffer taught "on a faculty whose theology he did not share". Hardcover, 650 pp: ISBN 978-0-8006-8312-2.
- London, 1933–1935. Dietrich Bonhoeffer's Works, Volume 13. Dietrich Bonhoeffer; Keith C. Clements, Editor. Translated by Isabel Best. Includes records and minutes of his congregational meetings, reports from international conferences from 1934, more than 20 sermons he preached in London, and more. Hardcover, 550 pp: ISBN 978-0-8006-8313-9.
- Theological Education at Finkenwalde: 1935–1937, Dietrich Bonhoeffer's Works, Volume 14, is a translation of Illegale Theologenausbildung: 1935–1937, was released on 1 October 2013. The publisher's description of the volume is thus: "In the spring of 1935 Dietrich Bonhoeffer returned from England to direct a small illegal seminary for the Confessing Church The seminary existed for two years before the Gestapo ordered it closed in August 1937. The two years of Finkenwalde's existence produced some of Bonhoeffer's most significant theological work as he prepared these young seminarians for the turbulence and risk of parish ministry in the Confessing Church. Bonhoeffer and his seminarians were under Gestapo surveillance; some of them were arrested and imprisoned. Throughout, he remained dedicated to training them for the ministry and its challenges in a difficult time. This volume includes bible studies, sermons, and lectures on homiletics, pastoral care, and catechesis, giving a moving and up-close portrait of the Confessing Church in these crucial years—the same period during which Bonhoeffer wrote his classics, Discipleship and Life Together."
- Theological Education Underground: 1937–1940, Dietrich Bonhoeffer's Works, Volume 15, is a translation of Illegale Theologenausbildung: 1937–1940. Hardcover, 750 pp: ISBN 978-0-8006-9815-7.
- Conspiracy and Imprisonment 1940–1945. Dietrich Bonhoeffer Works, Volume 16. Dietrich Bonhoeffer; Mark Brocker, Editor Translated by Lisa E. Dahill. Hundreds of letters, including ten never-before-published letters to his fiancée, Maria von Wedemeyer, as well as official documents, short original pieces, and his final sermons. Hardcover, 912 pp: ISBN 978-0-8006-8316-0.

Various works in the Bonhoeffer corpus individually published in English

- The Bonhoeffer Reader, edited by Clifford Green and Michael DeJonge. Fortress Press, 2013. ISBN 978-0-8006-9945-1. A representative collection of all Bonhoeffer's theological works in a single volume.
- Christology (1966) London: William Collins and New York: Harper and Row. Translation of lectures given in Berlin in 1933, from vol. 3 of Gesammelte Schriften, Christian Kaiser Verlag, 1960. retitled as Christ the Center, Harper San Francisco 1978 paperback: ISBN 978-0-06-060811-8
- The Cost of Discipleship (1948 in English). Touchstone edition with an introduction by Bishop George Bell and memoir by G. Leibholz, 1995 paperback: ISBN 978-0-684-81500-8. Critical edition published under its original title Discipleship: John D. Godsey (editor); Geffrey B. Kelly (editor). Fortress Press, 2000. ISBN 978-0-8006-8324-5. Bonhoeffer's most widely read book begins, "Cheap grace is the mortal enemy of our church. Our struggle today is for costly grace." That was a sharp warning to his own church, which was engaged in bitter conflict with the official Nazified state church. First published in 1937 as Nachfolge (Discipleship), it soon became a classic exposition of what it means to follow Christ in a modern world beset by a dangerous and criminal government. At its center stands an interpretation of the Sermon on the Mount: what Jesus demanded of his followers—and how the life of discipleship is to be continued in all ages of the post-resurrection church.
- Life Together. The stimulus for the writing of Life Together was the closing of the preachers' seminary at Finkenwalde. This treatise contains Bonhoeffer's thoughts about the nature of the Christian community based on the common life that he and his seminarians experienced at the seminary and in the "Brother's House" there. Life Together was completed in 1938, published in 1939 as Gemeinsames Leben, and first translated into English in 1954. Harper San Francisco 1978 paperback: ISBN 978-0-06-060852-1
- Ethics (1955 in English by SCM Press). Touchstone edition, 1995 paperback: ISBN 978-0-684-81501-5. This is the culmination of Bonhoeffer's theological and personal odyssey, even though the book was not completed and was not the Ethics which Bonhoeffer intended to have published. Based on careful reconstruction of the manuscripts, freshly and expertly translated and annotated, the critical edition features an insightful introduction by Clifford Green and an afterword from the German edition's editors. Though caught up in the vortex of momentous forces in the Nazi period, Bonhoeffer systematically envisioned a radically Christocentric, incarnational ethic for a post-war world, purposefully recasting Christians' relation to history, politics, and public life.
- Letters and Papers from Prison (Edited originally by Eberhard Bethge; first English translation 1953 by SCM Press). This edition translated by Reginald H. Fuller and Frank Clark from Widerstand und Ergebung: Briefe und Aufzeichnungen aus der Haft. Munich: Christian Kaiser Verlag (1970). Touchstone 1997 paperback: ISBN 978-0-684-83827-4. In hundreds of letters, including letters written to his fiancée, Maria von Wedemeyer (selected from the complete correspondence, previously published as Love Letters from Cell 92 Ruth-Alice von Bismarck and Ulrich Kabitz (editors), Abingdon Press (1995) ISBN 978-0-687-01098-1), as well as official documents, short original pieces, and a few final sermons, the volume sheds light on Bonhoeffer's active resistance to and increasing involvement in the conspiracy against the Hitler regime; his arrest; and his long imprisonment. Finally, Bonhoeffer's many exchanges with his family, fiancée, and closest friends, demonstrate the affection and solidarity that accompanied Bonhoeffer to his prison cell, concentration camp, and eventual death.
- A Testament to Freedom: The Essential Writings of Dietrich Bonhoeffer (1990). Geffrey B. Kelly and F. Burton Nelson, editors. Harper San Francisco 1995 2nd edition, paperback: ISBN 978-0-06-064214-3
- "Von guten Mächten wunderbar geborgen": "By Gentle Powers", a prayer he wrote shortly before his death. Various English translations.
- Bonhoeffer's papers are held in the Burke Library at Union Theological Seminary.

== See also ==
- Bonhoeffer (film)
- Martin Luther in Nazi Germany
