= The Cost of Discipleship =

1937 book by Dietrich Bonhoeffer

- Cover of a German postwar edition
- Author: Dietrich Bonhoeffer
- Original title: Nachfolge
- Translator: R. H. Fuller
- Language: German
- Publication date: 1937
- Publication place: Germany
- English publication date: 1948-10
- Media type: Print (hardcover and softcover)

The Cost of Discipleship (German: Nachfolge [ˈnaːxˌfɔlɡə], lit. 'following after') is a 1937 book by German theologian Dietrich Bonhoeffer, considered to be a classic of Christian thought. It is centered on an exposition of the Sermon on the Mount, in which Bonhoeffer spells out what he believes it means to follow Christ. The book was published in 1937, when the rise of the Nazi regime was underway in Germany. It was against this background that Bonhoeffer's theology of costly discipleship developed, which ultimately led to his death.

== Summary ==
One of the most quoted parts of the book deals with the distinction which Bonhoeffer makes between "cheap" and "costly" grace. According to Bonhoeffer,

cheap grace is the preaching of forgiveness without requiring repentance, baptism without church discipline. Communion without confession. Cheap grace is grace without discipleship, grace without the cross, grace without Jesus Christ, living and incarnate.

Cheap grace, Bonhoeffer says, is to hear the gospel preached as follows: "Of course you have sinned, but now everything is forgiven, so you can stay as you are and enjoy the consolations of forgiveness." The main defect of such a proclamation is that it contains no demand for discipleship. In contrast to cheap grace,

costly grace confronts us as a gracious call to follow Jesus, it comes as a word of forgiveness to the broken spirit and the contrite heart. It is costly because it compels a man to submit to the yoke of Christ and follow him; it is grace because Jesus says: "My yoke is easy and my burden is light."

Bonhoeffer argues that as Christianity spread, the Church became more "secularised", accommodating the demands of obedience to Jesus to the requirements of society. In this way, "the world was Christianised, and grace became its common property." But the hazard of this is that the gospel was cheapened, and obedience to the living Christ was gradually lost beneath formula and ritual, so that in the end grace could literally be sold for monetary gain.

But all the time, within the church there had been a living protest against this process: the monastic movement. This served as a "place where the older vision was kept alive." He goes on to say "monasticism was represented as an individual achievement which the mass of the laity could not be expected to emulate"; the commandments of Jesus were limited to "a restricted group of specialists," and a double standard arose: "a maximum and a minimum standard of church obedience." This was dangerous, Bonhoeffer says, because whenever the church was accused of being too worldly, it could always point to monasticism as "the opportunity of a higher standard within the fold—and thus justify the other possibility of a lower standard for others." So the monastic movement, instead of serving as a pointer for all Christians, became a justification for the status quo.

Bonhoeffer remarks how this was rectified by Martin Luther at the Reformation, when he brought Christianity "out of the cloister." However, he thinks that subsequent generations have again cheapened the preaching of the forgiveness of sins, and this has seriously weakened the church: "The price we are having to pay today in the shape of the collapse of the organised church is only the inevitable consequence of our policy of making grace available to all at too low a cost. We gave away the word and sacraments wholesale, we baptised, confirmed, and absolved a whole nation without condition. Our humanitarian sentiment made us give that which was holy to the scornful and unbelieving... But the call to follow Jesus in the narrow way was hardly ever heard."

== Influence ==
The Cost of Discipleship has been widely read by both conservative and liberal Christians and is still read and quoted today. Eberhard Bethge has argued that Bonhoeffer's writings, which culminated in the Ethics and Letters and Papers from Prison, form a seamless continuity, stretching back at least as far as The Cost of Discipleship.

The term "cheap grace" was coined by Adam Clayton Powell Sr., pastor of Abyssinian Baptist Church in Harlem, New York. Bonhoeffer attended the church while at Union Theological Seminary, and for a season he taught Sunday School there. Bonhoeffer benefited from the protest culture of the African American church and gleaned from it social gospel elements that he would take with him back to Germany. The anti-temporal power ethic would aid him to resist the Nazi regime.

The notion of cheap grace has been used by Mike Lofgren to criticize the increasing dominance of the Christian right over the Republican Party coupled with what he saw as an increasing disregard within the party for other values:

But there is another, uniquely religious aspect that also comes into play: the predilection of fundamentalist denominations to believe in practice, even if not entirely in theory, in the doctrine of “cheap grace,” a derisive term coined by the theologian Dietrich Bonhoeffer. By that he meant the inclination of some religious adherents to believe that once they had been “saved,” not only would all past sins be wiped away, but future ones, too—so one could pretty much behave as before. Cheap grace is a divine get-out-of-jail-free card. Hence, the tendency of the religious base of the Republican Party to cut some slack for the peccadilloes of candidates who claim to have been washed in the blood of the Lamb and reborn to a new and more Christian life. The religious right is willing to overlook a politician’s individual foibles, no matter how poor an example he or she may make, if they publicly identify with fundamentalist values.

Similarly, Katelyn Beatty of Christianity Today warns against the Christian use of cheap grace in excusing powerful men guilty of sexual assault.
