= Eberhard Bethge =

German theologian and pastor (1909-2000)

Eberhard Bethge

Eberhard Bethge (August 28, 1909 – March 18, 2000) was a German theologian and pastor, best known for being the close friend and biographer of the theologian and anti-Nazi Dietrich Bonhoeffer.

== Early life ==
Bethge was born in Warchau, Landkreis Jerichow II, Province of Saxony, the Kingdom of Prussia, near Magdeburg, on August 29, 1909. He attended several universities, as is customary for theology students in Germany, before attending the underground Finkenwalde Seminary in Pomerania where Bonhoeffer taught in the name of Germany's Confessing Church (part of the anti-Nazi resistance). Bethge became Bonhoeffer's close friend and confidant. With the help of pietist congregations within the old-Prussian Ecclesiastical Province of Pomerania, the seminary would be relocated twice after Nazi-imposed closures.

== Resistance ==
Although a member of the Resistance, Bethge was drafted to serve in the German army during World War II. He was later arrested, along with dozens of other resisters, after the failed attempt to kill Adolf Hitler on July 20, 1944, but he was rescued by Soviet troops shortly before his scheduled trial before the People's Court.

== Professor ==
After the war, he spent several years as pastor for the same German-speaking congregation in Sydenham, London, England, that Bonhoeffer had served from 1933 to 1935. From 1961 to his retirement in 1975, Bethge was the Director of the 'Pastoral College' of one of the Protestant regional churches in Germany, the Evangelical Church in the Rhineland, charged with continuing ministerial education – a task which no doubt had an element of continuity with his and Bonhoeffer's work in the seminary in Pomerania in the 1930s.

Although Bethge was never formally appointed to a university post, he held various academic posts and lectureships, including stints at Harvard Divinity School, Chicago Theological Seminary, and Union Theological Seminary in New York City; he was named 'Honorary Professor' at the University of Bonn in 1969. While at CTS, Bethge traveled to Kalamazoo, Michigan, in late October 1966 for an evening supper program attended by local college and university students. He continued to give lectures until a year before his death in 2000.

Bethge is best known as the author of the definitive biography Dietrich Bonhoeffer: Man of Vision, Man of Courage. (A new English-language version, Dietrich Bonhoeffer: A Biography, was released in February 2000, edited by Victoria J. Barnett, with corrections of some translation errors, as well as some added material from the German edition, most notably on Bonhoeffer's childhood, that had never appeared in English.) Bethge also collected and edited Bonhoeffer's Letters and Papers from Prison (most of the which were addressed to him), as well as the unfinished effort Bonhoeffer considered his main life's work: Ethics. In 1995, Bethge edited Friendship and Resistance: Essays on Dietrich Bonhoeffer.

Given that Bonhoeffer was hanged by the Nazis at 39, a relatively young age, as well as the fact that Bonhoeffer's work was mostly "behind the scenes" rather than in the forefront of the Confessing Church movement, he was largely unknown in Germany and internationally. It was due to Bethge's untiring efforts that Bonhoeffer's theological and political legacy was preserved for future generations, and that Bonhoeffer became known as a key theologian of the 20th century.

In 1991 Bethge wrote an article for Christian History titled "My Friend Dietrich." Reflecting on his former companion's work, he admitted that "the language, concepts, and thought paradigms of this man are a half century old and older... We find in him no answers to many of our most pressing questions... Even the world changed by half a century has not diminished, but rather expanded, the question of whether and how we are responsible citizens. Are we mature members of our society, states, corporations, and churches?... Unavoidably, we corrupt or renew the Christian claim and faith. Even in the nuclear, ecological, and feminist age, no one eludes the demands of citizenship with which Bonhoeffer struggled."

Bethge died at Wachtberg, Rhein-Sieg-Kreis (District), of North Rhine-Westphalia, Germany. He was survived by his wife Renate (Dietrich Bonhoeffer's niece), as well as by a son and two daughters. He is buried at Bad Godesberg, a municipal district of Bonn, Germany.

== Awards ==
- Dr.-Leopold-Lucas-Preis 1979
- Order of Merit of the Federal Republic of Germany, Great Cross with Star 1999

== Works ==
- Eberhard Bethge (ed.), Dietrich Bonhoeffer: Letters and Papers From Prison, New greatly enlarged edition. (New Y Papersork: Touchstone (Simon & Schuster), 1997).
- Eberhard Bethge, Dietrich Bonhoeffer: Theologian, Christian, Man for His Times: A Biography. Rev. ed. (Minneapolis, Fortress Press, 2000).
