= Charité (TV series) =

German drama television series

- Genre: Drama
- Created by: Dorothee Schön
- Written by: Dorothee Schön; Sabine Thor-Wiedemann (Seasons 1 & 2); Stefan Dähnert; John-Hendrik Karsten; Christine Hartmann; Regine Bielefeldt; Thomas Laue (Season 3)
- Directed by: Sönke Wortmann (Season 1); Anno Saul (Season 2); Christine Hartmann (Season 3)
- Starring: Alicia von Rittberg; Maximilian Meyer-Bretschneider; Justus von Dohnányi; Matthias Koeberlin; Christoph Bach; Ernst Stötzner (all above Season 1); Mala Emde; Ulrich Noethen; Jannik Schümann; Luise Wolfram; Artjom Gilz; Jacob Matschenz (all above Season 2)
- Theme music composer: Martin Lingnau; Ingmar Süberkrüb (Season 1); John Gürtler; Hannah von Hübbenet (Season 2); Fabian Römer; Matthias Hillebrand-Gonzalez (Season 3)
- Country of origin: Germany
- Original language: German
- No. of series: 4
- No. of episodes: 24

Production
- Executive producers: Benjamin Benedict; Markus Brunnemann; Nico Hofmann; Sebastian Werninger
- Producers: Henriette Lippold; Michal Pokorný
- Cinematography: Holly Fink
- Editors: Boris Gromatzki; Julia Karg; Dirk Grau
- Running time: 45 minutes
- Production companies: MIA Film; UFA Fiction

Original release
- Network: Das Erste
- Release: 21 March 2017 – present

Charité is a German drama television series. The first season was directed by Sönke Wortmann, and was written by Grimme-Preis winner Dorothee Schön and Sabine Thor-Wiedemann. The season is set during 1888 and the years following at Berlin's Charité hospital. The series premiered on 21 March 2017 on the German channel Das Erste, and was distributed in the USA and UK on Netflix between April 2018 and June 2022.

A second series went into production in November 2017, and first aired in Germany in February 2019. This season is directed by Anno Saul and was also written by Schön and Thor-Wiedemann. It is set in the years from 1943 to 1945. The cast was replaced with an entirely new set of actors because the many years elapsed in the storyline meant that all characters were different. This second series began streaming on Netflix in North America in mid-2019 as Charité at War.

Season 3 launched on ARD and Netflix Germany on 12 January 2021. The season is set in 1961, the same year that construction began on the Berlin Wall.

== Cast ==
=== Season 1 ===
- Alicia von Rittberg as Ida Lenze, a fictitious patient and recipient of a life-saving operation who becomes an indentured medical assistant for the hospital.
- Maximilian Meyer-Bretschneider as Georg Tischendorf, a medical student who wishes to be a photographer
- Justus von Dohnányi as Robert Koch, a revolutionary bacteriologist, who has recently returned from India
- Matthias Koeberlin as Emil Behring, an ambitious doctor with an opium addiction
- Christoph Bach as Paul Ehrlich, a Jewish doctor with tuberculosis
- Ernst Stötzner as Rudolf Virchow, a professor and head of pathology
- Matthias Brenner as Ernst von Bergmann, a surgeon
- Thomas Loibl as Bernhard Spinola
- Emilia Schüle as Hedwig Freiberg, an actress with an almost obsessive interest in bacteriology and particularly Robert Koch
- Ramona Kunze-Libnow as Matron Martha, the devout matron of the nurses at Charité
- Klara Deutschmann as Sister Therese, a recently promoted nurse and friend of Ida
- Tanja Schleiff as Nurse Edith, a nurse with unionization aspirations
- Monika Oschek as Nurse Stine, a nurse who contracts diphtheria
- Daniel Sträßer as Heinrich von Minckwitz, a reporter for the Berlin Daily
- Greta Bohacek as Mariechen
- Stella Hilb as Hedda Ehrlich
- Lucas Prisor as Kaiser Wilhelm II
- Runa Greiner as Else Spinola
- Rosa Enskat as Emmi Koch
- Yusuke Yamasaki as Kitasato Shibasaburō, a Japanese bacteriologist working with Robert Koch
- Michael Pitthan as Arthur Conan Doyle
- Thomas Zielinski as Carl Hagenbeck

=== Season 2 ===
- Mala Emde as Anni Waldhausen, a medical student, studying eugenics under De Crinis and writing a dissertation on self-mutilation; an expectant mother
- Ulrich Noethen as Ferdinand Sauerbruch, a pioneering surgeon and the head of surgery at Charité
- Jannik Schümann as Otto Marquardt, a medical student, to be sent to the Eastern Front, closely-aligned with Ferdinand
- Luise Wolfram as Margot Sauerbruch, Ferdinand's wife
- Artjom Gilz as Artur Waldhausen, Anni's husband, working for De Crinis, euthanising "unwanted children"
- Jacob Matschenz as Martin Schelling, a male nurse with a prosthetic leg, works for Ferdinand and is especially close to Otto.
- Frida-Lovisa Hamann as Nurse Christel, a nurse who still believes in Germany's "ultimate victory"
- Susanne Böwe as Nurse Käthe, a matron nurse
- Lukas Miko as Max de Crinis, a surgeon general high-ranking in the NSDAP; a staunch proponent of eugenics and heading up Aktion T4
- Hans Löw as Adolphe Jung (de), an immigrant doctor who hides his dislike of the NSDAP
- Sarah Bauerett as Maria Fritsch (de), an American spy along Fritz Kolbe
- Marek Harloff as Fritz Kolbe, an American spy with Maria Fritsch
- Peter Kremer as Georg Bessau (de), a professor who softly champions the involuntary euthanasia program
- Katharina Heyer as Magda Goebbels, Joseph Goebbels's wife
- Maximilian Klas as Peter Sauerbruch, Ferdinand and Margot's son
- Pierre Kiwitt as Claus von Stauffenberg, a soldier who served alongside Peter
- Max von Pufendorf as Hans von Dohnányi, a severely-ill patient of Ferdinand's
- Anja Schneider as Christine von Dohnanyi, Hans's wife
- Thomas Neumann as Karl Bonhoeffer, De Crinis's predecessor
- Ludwig Simon as Paul Lohmann, a patient at Charité suspected of having self-inflicted his gunshot wound

=== Season 3 ===
- Nina Gummich as Ella Wendt
- Nina Kunzendorf as Ingeborg Rapoport
- Philipp Hochmair as Otto Prokop
- Uwe Ochsenknecht as Helmut Kraatz
- Max Wagner as Alexander Nowack
- Franz Hartwig as Curt Bruncken
- Patricia Meeden as nurse Ariana
- Amber Bongard as nurse Petra
- Hildegard Schroedter as head nurse Gerda
- Uwe Preuss as janitor Fritz Krug
- Timo Meitner as assistant Wittenberg
- Anatole Taubmann as Mitja Rapoport
- Nicholas Reinke as party secretary Lehmann
- Peter Miklusz as Hajo Brennscheidt
- Christian Beermann as captain Hertweck

== Episodes ==
Series	Episodes	Originally released	
Series	Episodes	First released	Last released
1	6	21 March 2017	18 April 2017
2	6	12 February 2019	19 March 2019
3	6	12 January 2021	26 January 2021

=== Series 1 (2017) ===
In 1888, the Charité was on its way to becoming a famous hospital. Being a city within itself had its own laws and rules. At the beginning of the Wilhelmine Period, up to 4,000 patients were treated annually. Along with injuries caused by industrialization, patients suffered from infectious diseases such as tuberculosis, diphtheria, typhoid and cholera, as well as from sexually transmitted diseases. In addition, there were many medical students, taught at the Berlin University, who were being trained in this hospital by future Nobel Prize winners and doctors of the time: Rudolf Virchow, the founder of modern health care systems, Robert Koch, the discoverer of the tuberculosis bacillus, Emil von Behring, whose work contributed to the healing of diphtheria, and Paul Ehrlich, who developed the first drug against syphilis.

No. overall	No. in series	Title	Directed by	Written by	Original release date
1	1	"Barmherzigkeit" "Compassion"	Sönke Wortmann	Dorothee Schön, Sabine Thor-Wiedemann	21 March 2017
With her last strength orphan Ida Lenze, suffering from acute appendictis, drags herself to the Berlin Charité, where young staff doctor Emil Behring saves her life with an emergency operation. He is one of the few surgeons who can do the tricky new procedure. Behring applies to work for famed institute director Robert Koch. The eyes of the world are on Koch, who is working on a remedy for tuberculosis (TB), a deadly disease at the time. However, the job goes to Behring's rival Paul Ehrlich, the Jewish doctor to whom Koch is like a father. Koch needs Ehrlich, who is famous for his work on colorizing cells, more than ever right now because he is at a dead end in his research, and in his marriage as well. When vivacious debutante actress Hedwig Freiberg meets Koch, 30 years her senior, he falls head over heels in love with her. A prominent patient is keeping not only the Charité on edge, but the whole German Empire: Crown Prince Friedrich may have cancer of the larynx. Rudolf Virchow, the Charité's world-famous pathologist, examines tissues taken from his larynx him and is relieved: he can find no sign of cancer. Virchow tries to uphold his liberal values in a time of rising nationalism. Ida is well again, thanks in large part to the care of medical student Georg Tischendorf – but she has lost her job as a nanny. To pay for her treatment in the Charité, she has to work there as nursing assistant.
2	2	"Kaiserwetter" "Sunny Weather"	Sönke Wortmann	Dorothee Schön, Sabine Thor-Wiedemann	21 March 2017
Ida suffers under the strict thumb of Deaconess Matron Martha, while making friends with shy young nurse Therese. Therese is attracted to Ida, as is medical student Georg Tischendorf. While Ida's job at the clinic gets her interested in medicine, artistically talented Georg is just studying to please his father. Behring tells Ida that women can study medicine in Switzerland but not in the German Reich, and gives her books to read. Koch starts an affair with Hedwig, and is trying to keep this a secret. Liberal reformers in the Reich like Virchow hope for a political thaw now that Kaiser Friedrich III has ascended the throne. But Friedrich is diagnosed with laryngeal cancer. The treatment by the surgeons of the Charité cannot save him and he dies after a reign of a mere 99 days, leaving his nationalist son as the next Kaiser, Wilhelm II. When the niece of clinic director Spinola comes down with diphtheria, Dr. Behring saves her life with a tracheotomy, thereby becoming one of Spinola's favorites. Behring convinces Spinola of his revolutionary idea for a diphtheria remedy. Mrs. Spinola and their daughter Else enjoy the young doctor's frequent private calls, as well. Only Ida knows he has to use opiates to keep his manic-depressive mood swings in check. The Charité staff work around the clock meanwhile, because the new Kaiser is coming to visit in person! While the Kaiserin Augusta embarrasses the scientists with her wisdom gleaned from illustrated magazines, the Kaiser is only interested in Koch's lab and TB bacillus research. The Kaiser promises Koch his own research institute if he can find a remedy by the time of the next World Medical Convention. Koch is speechless, so Bergmann saves the day by announcing that German science will gain "victory" over the French at the Convention.
3	3	"Das Licht der Welt" "The Light of the World"	Sönke Wortmann	Dorothee Schön, Sabine Thor-Wiedemann	28 March 2017
Dr. Ehrlich's wife Hedda is ready to give birth, but the midwife cannot get the fetus turned the right way. When the child's pulse starts to fade and the situation becomes critical, there is only one surgeon left at the clinic who can help: Emil Behring. Dr. Behring saves Hedda's life, but her child dies. Meanwhile, thousands of physicians from around the world arrive in Berlin for the World Medical Convention to hear Koch speak: his careful announcement of a possible remedy for tuberculosis causes excitement in the international medical community. But the drug has never been tested on humans. Georg Tischendorf wants to marry Ida, even though she may not be socially acceptable for someone of his social standing. In order to get his conservative father's approval, he joins a student fencing fraternity. Ida is taken aback by his efforts to do what Wilhelmine society expects of him to become a "real man". When Georg unexpectedly and drunkenly proposes to her, she says she needs time to think about it. She confides her feelings for Dr. Behring to Nurse Therese, especially since he encourages her to pursue her medical ambitions. The two hug, and Therese kisses Ida. Afterwards, Ida is speechless, and Therese runs away. Georg explains to Ida his ambition to be a photographer. Later, Therese avoids Ida, saying only that her feelings for Ida alienate her from God, and Georg notices Ida talking to Dr. Behring once more.
4	4	"Wundermittel" "Miracle Cure"	Sönke Wortmann	Dorothee Schön, Sabine Thor-Wiedemann	4 April 2017
Treating contagious cases carries its dangers: nurse Therese comes down with tuberculosis, and is told to leave the Charité – as is usual – to die in a women's house. But Ida convinces matron Martha to allow Therese to remain at the Charité to be nursed. Meanwhile, Koch tests his new tuberculosis remedy on himself and his lover Hedwig, as well as on Paul Ehrlich, who has recovered from tuberculosis previously. His remedy sometimes has serious side effects, so Ida is recruited to secretly tend to the feverish Koch. She makes friends with Hedwig, who has become an object of scandal in Berlin as Koch's mistress. Koch returns home still ill, to the disapproval of his wife, who knows about Hedwig. Ida talks to Hedwig about her inner conflict: should she really study medicine in Switzerland? Or should she marry Georg and become a doctor's wife? And then there are her confusing feelings for Behring, who is achieving his first successes with his diphtheria serum: he manages to heal infected rabbits, and when he talks to Ida about this, they end up kissing. But when Behring tries to repeat the sensational experiment for his colleagues with photography arranged by Georg, the demonstration fails. Behring falls into despair. With Ida's urgent encouragement, Koch dares to take the next step with his tuberculin, injecting Therese as the first human patient who already has the disease.
5	5	"Götterdämmerung" "Twilight of the Gods"	Sönke Wortmann	Dorothee Schön, Sabine Thor-Wiedemann	11 April 2017
News of Robert Koch's "miracle drug" tuberculin travels the world. Berlin is overrun by tuberculosis patients and doctors, who lay siege to the Charité night and day. Koch hopes his breakthrough will get him the money he needs to obtain a divorce and marry Hedwig. But the tuberculin fails to heal more and more patients and accusations of a hoax surface, making Hedwig distraught. Therese dies, and Ida is upset, saying that she had wanted Therese as her maid of honor at her wedding. Ida blames herself for insisting her friend be treated with tuberculin. Nevertheless, when nursing assistant Stine comes down with diphtheria, Ida begs Behring to try his untested serum. Hospital administrator Spinola and his daughter Else are witnesses when Behring's remedy heals a patient. They realize that he is a rising star in the medical world. Ida is fascinated by Behring's success too, and when they talk about it, they end up kissing passionately despite her feelings for Georg. She reaches a decision: she will study medicine even if it seems to her fellow orderly nurses to be above her place and unrealistic. It is not only her colleagues who are taken aback at Ida's plans. When Georg introduces Ida to his father to get his blessing for their marriage, Ida tells them of her plans to study to be a doctor. This dismays Georg, and her father dismisses Ida from their presence.
6	6	"Zeitenwende" "Turning Point"	Sönke Wortmann	Dorothee Schön, Sabine Thor-Wiedemann	18 April 2017
Hagenbeck's "Peoples of the World Show" at the Berlin Zoo brings an unusual patient to the Charité: an Indian woman has come down with variola (smallpox), a disease which has been wiped out in Germany thanks to inoculation. Virchow, the unchallenged star at the Charité again after his triumph over his colleague Koch, is fascinated by anthropology and accepts the patient as an object of demonstration. Nursing assistant Stine keeps her distance, but she begins to feel affection for the Indian woman when she cares for her as she is dying. Koch becomes an outcast. Only his closest friends come to his wedding with Hedwig, including Ida and Dr. Ehrlich. Koch's scientific failure also unjustly discredits Ehrlich and Behring's work. No one at the Charité wants to try their diphtheria serum on human patients. This plunges Behring into a deep depression. Ida suspects that the brilliant but sensitive man needs a strong woman at his side – and thinks she is willing to give up on her dream of studying medicine for his sake. Georg has seemingly abandoned any idea of marrying her. But when Virchow gives a ringing public endorsement to Behring's remedy after some positive results elsewhere, Behring is thrown into a manic euphoria, inconsiderate to anyone around him and taking drugs once more. He takes advantage of his colleague Ehrlich, who is suffering from increasing antisemitic repression, as they negotiate with pharmaceuticals company Hoechst over a deal for the drug. He and Ida end up kissing again, but his relationship with her no longer seems useful as he dreams of social climbing, and instead he becomes engaged to Else Spinola. Ida has worked off her debt to the Charité and is accepted to study medicine in Switzerland. It is revealed in a voiceover that after studying medicine in Zurich, Ida returned to the Charité but was only allowed to work without payment, and never married. The fate of the other characters is also revealed: Behring went on to win a Nobel Prize for his diphtheria cure and to have many children. Koch's tuberculin failed as a cure but was later used as a diagnostic test, and he won the Nobel Prize for his work. Paul Ehrlich created the first cure for syphilis and won the Nobel Prize in 1908, but his achievements were denied while the Nazis were in power because he was Jewish. Virchow was well-renowned for his careers in both medicine and politics, and he continued to advocate for basic public health care and against anti-semitism.

=== Series 2 (2019) ===
In 1943, more and more patients are admitted into the Berlin Charité due to World War II. The hospital is still considered a focal point for medicine, but the staff is divided since some members do not support the regime while others are staunch followers of the government. One of the best known doctors at the Charité is Ferdinand Sauerbruch, a surgeon practicing there since 1928. He became world-famous in the 1930s by developing innovative surgical techniques which greatly decreased the risks of operations at the time. He was also responsible for inventing new types of prostheses which improved the mobility of a patient's remaining muscle. He seems to become more and more critical of the Nazi regime as World War II progresses, which makes him clash with several of his colleagues. One of them is Max de Crinis, a psychiatrist. He is a high-ranking member of the SS who greatly supports the government. Unlike Sauerbruch, De Crinis is also an avid proponent of the country's euthanasia programmes, some of which are carried out at the Charité.

No. overall	No. in series	Title	Directed by	Written by	Original release date
7	1	"Heimatschuss" "Blighty Wound"	Anno Saul	Dorothee Schön, Sabine Thor-Wiedemann	12 February 2019
Anni Waldhausen, a pregnant medical student, takes her exams. Her professor is Ferdinand Sauerbruch, a surgeon who grew to fame at the Berlin Charité for inventing a surgical technique that prevents amputation of a patient's damaged thigh. Anni does not want to practice medicine before her child is born and focuses on writing a thesis about self-mutilation. Her mentor, Max de Crinis, is head of the psychiatry ward at the hospital and a Nazi official. Anni's husband Artur is chief resident of the children's ward. He is testing a new TB vaccine on disabled children in state custody. Anni's brother Otto has recently returned from his frontline duty to continue his study of medicine. He gets a job as a clinic clerk and makes friends with Martin, an orderly and former soldier with a leg prothesis who quickly realizes that Otto's easygoing personality is just an act to hide his severe PTSD. Paul Lohmann, a soldier and former comrade of Otto who gets treated with Sauerbruch's new form of surgery, is suspected to have shot himself in the leg. Anni wants to interview him for her thesis, but this is prevented by Sauerbruch's wife Margot who wants to protect Lohmann. Otto helps Lohmann by giving a report about him during his duty despite not knowing him well, but de Crinis creates a psychological profile of Lohmann who gets accused of Wehrkraftzersetzung and sentenced to death. Otto gets into a fight with Anni who defends her mentor's behaviour. Anni soon goes into labour and suffers a heavy hemorrhage.
8	2	"Schwere Geburt" "A Difficult Birth"	Anno Saul	Dorothee Schön, Sabine Thor-Wiedemann	12 February 2019
Anni nearly dies due to severe blood loss, but is saved by Professor Stoeckel. Her daughter does not show any life signs, but is successfully revived by the doctors. Anni shares a room with Magda Goebbels who is suicidal because of a recent miscarriage. Artur tenderly cares for Anni while Goebbels' husband is nowhere to be seen. Magda Goebbels is constantly drunk, makes sarcastic remarks about life and admits to Anni that her marriage has become nothing more than a façade. In the meantime, Sauerbruch has a new colleague. Adolphe Jung is a surgeon from Strasbourg and has been transferred to Berlin. Together they save a young boy named Emil who is seriously hurt. Christel, a nurse and avid Nazi supporter, finds a leaflet of the White Rose that belongs to the patient. She wants to report Emil, but Martin tears the leaflet apart. She wants to report Martin, as well, but Otto swiftly asks Christel out on a date when she threatens to. Martin witnesses this and realizes that Otto rejects the regime, just like him. Christel tells Otto that Martin regularly has to report himself to the police. When Otto asks Martin about, Martin denies it. All patients have to be brought to the basement due to an air raid. Emil is deemed not suitable for transport, but Martin and Otto carry him down with a makeshift stretcher. Jung and Margot have to perform emergency surgery on him because one of his stitches has ripped open. Afterwards, Jung tells Sauerbruch about a speech Thomas Mann has delivered on British radio about the deliberate killings of patients in the Charité. Sauerbruch doubts something like this could happen in the hospital and also denies any rumors about human experiments on disabled people and Nazi prisoners. His son Peter gets taken to the clinic because of a hepatitis infection, Claus von Stauffenberg pays him a visit. At the end of the episode, both Anni and her daughter Karin are allowed to return home. There, Anni is shocked to discover that her child has an increased intracranial pressure that will likely result in a hydrocephalus.
9	3	"Letzte Hoffnung" "Last Hope"	Anno Saul	Dorothee Schön, Sabine Thor-Wiedemann	26 February 2019
Artur punctures Karin's head to decrease the pressure on her brain, a procedure which seems to work at first since her head develops normally. Sauerbruch is visited by Karl Bonhoeffer who was de Crinis' predecessor. Bonhoeffer tells him that Hans von Dohnanyi, his son-in-law, was arrested, had a stroke in prison and is now paralyzed from the waist down. He asks Sauerbruch to take him in and protect him, which Sauerbruch agrees to. De Crinis wonders whether von Dohanyi is just a malingerer and orders Nurse Christel to watch him at all times. Karin's brain pressure increases again. A desperate Anni and Artur plead with Sauerbruch to perform a potentially life-threatening surgery on their child. Sauerbruch operates on her secretly, but is overwhelmed by the complexity of the surgery. Jung saves Karin by successfully finishing the operation. Artur asks Sauerbruch to keep Karin in the surgical ward, since she wouldn't be safe in the children's ward because of his superior Professor Bessau who supports the euthanasia program. Otto is angered by his sister's naiveté and bluntly tells her that children like Karin are usually killed. Anni doesn't believe him, but realizes the truth when she looks at documents about her husband's experiments and discovers that all test subjects are disabled. On Christmas Eve, Sauerbruch delivers a speech about humanity and love in medicine. Nurse Christel passes out sheets with new lyrics to Silent Night which praise the Führer. Some, such as de Crinis and Nurse Christel sing these new lyrics, but others sing the traditional song. Later, Otto tells Martin that he is in love with him. He replies that he has already been reprimanded for his homosexuality, while his lover was sent to a concentration camp, and this is why he reports to the police every week. He says if he is caught again he will be sent to a concentration camp. Otto and Martin kiss, but afterwards, Martin says they cannot do it again.
10	4	"Verschüttet" "Buried"	Anno Saul	Dorothee Schön, Sabine Thor-Wiedemann	5 March 2019
Karin can return home in January 1944 after her recovery. Käthe, a children's nurse, suspects the true reasons for her hospitalization, but Artur and Anni assert that she fell from her changing table. Artur tells Anni that he got new test subjects, but avoids the subject when she wants to know more about his experiments. De Crinis keeps trying to prove that von Dohnanyi is not really sick, but Sauerbruch urges him to wait before creating a profile, to which de Crinis grudgingly agrees. Both Dr. Jung and Margot Sauerbruch fear that Fritz Kolbe, the lover of Sauerbruch's secretary Maria Fritsch, is a Wehrmacht spy who gives clinic information to his superiors. When they catch him taking photographs of documents, he admits that he is actually a member of the resistance and provides the Allies with information. Dr. Jung and Margot offer their support. Margot takes the information and accompanies her husband to Switzerland where he wants to give a lecture and gives the information to a contact person. De Crinis exploits Sauerbruch's absence to declare von Dohanyi a malingerer and gets him arrested again. A woman who had been buried under debris gets admitted. She becomes apathetic when she learns that her missing son probably died. De Crinis says that she suffers from hysteria and orders Otto to prepare her for a euthanasia program. Otto tells Anni about this, but she doesn't seem to care and says that euthanasia programs were just made up by the Allies. A short time later she realizes that an admitted orphan is the woman's son and reunites them. Karin's brain pressure increases again and she has to be hospitalized. Käthe tells Professor Bessau about her case who wants to put Karin in a Kinderfachabteilung (which means specialty children's department, but is actually a euphemism for a Child Euthanasia program). Anni and Artur narrowly prevent this when they tell Bessau they will try one final therapy, to which he agrees.
11	5	"Im Untergrund" "Underground"	Anno Saul	Dorothee Schön, Sabine Thor-Wiedemann	12 March 2019
There are more and more air raids on Berlin. Because of this, a surgery bunker has been built in the Charité's yard which soon becomes crowded and is not well equipped. Von Stauffenberg has returned from his military service in North Africa and had his hand amputated. Sauerbruch wants to provide him with an innovative prosthesis called Sauerbruch-Arm. His injuries are also the subject of Otto's exam questions. He struggles at first, but ultimately passes his test. Karin's therapy is useless, which is why Artur sends her to the Kinderfachabteilung without Anni's knowledge. Anni discovers this and intervenes before Karin is transported. She secretly hides her in the attic of the bombed out staff apartments. Artur questions his wife when he learns that Karin never arrived at the clinic, but Anni does not tell him anything. Sauerbruch gets arrested and interrogated after a failed attempt on Hitler's life, but is able to convince his interrogators that neither he nor his son had anything to do with it. Otto gets drafted. As he is leaving for the front, Christel confesses her love to him, because she both has genuine feelings for him and wants to receive financial support for widows of fallen soldiers, but he rejects her. This is why she reveals his relationship with Martin to the police who arrest both. Martin might get sent to a concentration camp, while Otto will be released if he says that Martin seduced him. Instead, he suggests that Christel reported them because he rejected her, and that there are witnesses to the rejection at the hospital, such as Margot Sauerbruch. The police call Margot and she confirms that Otto rejected Nurse Christel, and Otto is released. Later, Anni gets De Crinis to declare both of them heterosexual by flirting with him in his office and suggesting that they are womanizers; thus Martin is also released. Christel complains to Margot that she does not want to work with the sex offender Martin, but Margot replies that if that is the case, she can be transferred to the front instead. Martin briefly tries to strangle Christel when she asks him about his necklace, which actually belongs to Otto, telling her not to say anything.
12	6	"Stunde Null" "Zero Hour"	Anno Saul	Dorothee Schön, Sabine Thor-Wiedemann	19 March 2019
In early 1945, Sauerbruch and his staff have to operate on wounded soldiers and civilians with only a very limited amount of medicine, water and electricity available. Anni and Artur avoid each other; Artur wants to save their relationship nonetheless. He notices that an admitted boy with severe burn wounds who recently lost his mother and sister in a concentration camp is Jewish, but does not give him away. Later, the boy's father gives him a Yellow badge which will protect Artur from the approaching Red Army as they will think he is Jewish. Anni steals Artur's key to the hospital food stocks to take food for the hidden Karin and Otto, but Artur realizes and confronts her. Martin meets some underaged Volkssturm soldiers who are determined to defend the heavily damaged city from the incoming Soviets. They are led into the hospital by Christel despite it being declared a neutral zone. Martin tricks the group, locks them in the basement and tells them he will only release them if they throw their guns out the window. He ignores Christel's protests while telling her that the child soldiers have mothers who will thank him later. Karin is brought to the bunker while Otto stays in his hideout because deserters are still being executed even though the war is almost over. De Crinis is approached by Magda Goebbels, who asks him to give her potassium cyanide because she wants to kill herself and her children. De Crinis says he only has two pills, for himself and his wife, and recommend Frau Goebbels to give anesthetics to her children to avoid seeing their spasms; shortly afterwards De Crinis and his wife commit suicide upon being blocked by Red Army soldiers. The Soviet soldiers reach the bunker and hold the medical staff at gunpoint, but do not harm anyone once they know about Sauerbruch's medical abilities, and make him and his team tend to their wounded comrades. Christel is shot during one of the last shoot-outs in the streets while Otto gets hit by a stray bullet, but Martin saves him by getting him to the bunker. It is announced that Hitler has committed suicide, and Artur leaves the bunker to surrender to the Red Army, which evacuates the bunker. It is revealed that after the war, Annie divorced Artur, Karin had a happy life despite her disability, Otto and Martin were able to have a more open relationship in the GDR in the 1950s, Kolbe and Fritsch were happily married, Jung became an admired surgeon in France, and Margot Sauerbruch outlived her husband for 40 years, never marrying again.

=== Series 3 (2021) ===
No. overall	No. in series	Title	Directed by	Written by	Original release date
13	1	"Eiserne Lunge" "Iron Lung"	Christine Hartmann	Stefan Dähnert, John-Hendrik Karsten, Christine Hartmann, Thomas Laue	12 January 2021
14	2	"Blutsauger" "Bloodsuckers"	Christine Hartmann	Stefan Dähnert, John-Hendrik Karsten, Christine Hartmann, Thomas Laue	12 January 2021
15	3	"Grenzwerte" "Value Limits"	Christine Hartmann	Regine Bielefeldt, Christine Hartmann, Thomas Laue	19 January 2021
16	4	"Atemstillstand" "Apnea"	Christine Hartmann	Regine Bielefeldt, Christine Hartmann, Thomas Laue	19 January 2021
17	5	"Sepsis" "Sepsis"	Christine Hartmann	John-Hendrik Karsten, Christine Hartmann, Thomas Laue	26 January 2021
18	6	"Herzflimmern" "Fibrillation"	Christine Hartmann	Stefan Dähnert, Christine Hartmann, Thomas Laue	26 January 2021
