= Sauerbruch =

Sauerbruch is a German surname, which means "sour marsh", from the German sauer ("sour") and the Middle High German bruoch, meaning a "marsh" or stream that often flooded. The name may refer to:

- Ferdinand Sauerbruch (1875–1951), German surgeon
- Matthias Sauerbruch (born 1955), German architect
- Peter Sauerbruch (1913–2010), German soldier

== See also ==
- 13086 Sauerbruch, a main-belt asteroid
- Sauerbruch chamber
- Sauerbruch – Das war mein Leben, a 1954 German film
- Sauerbruch Hutton, a German architecture firm
