= Bonhoeffer family =

German family

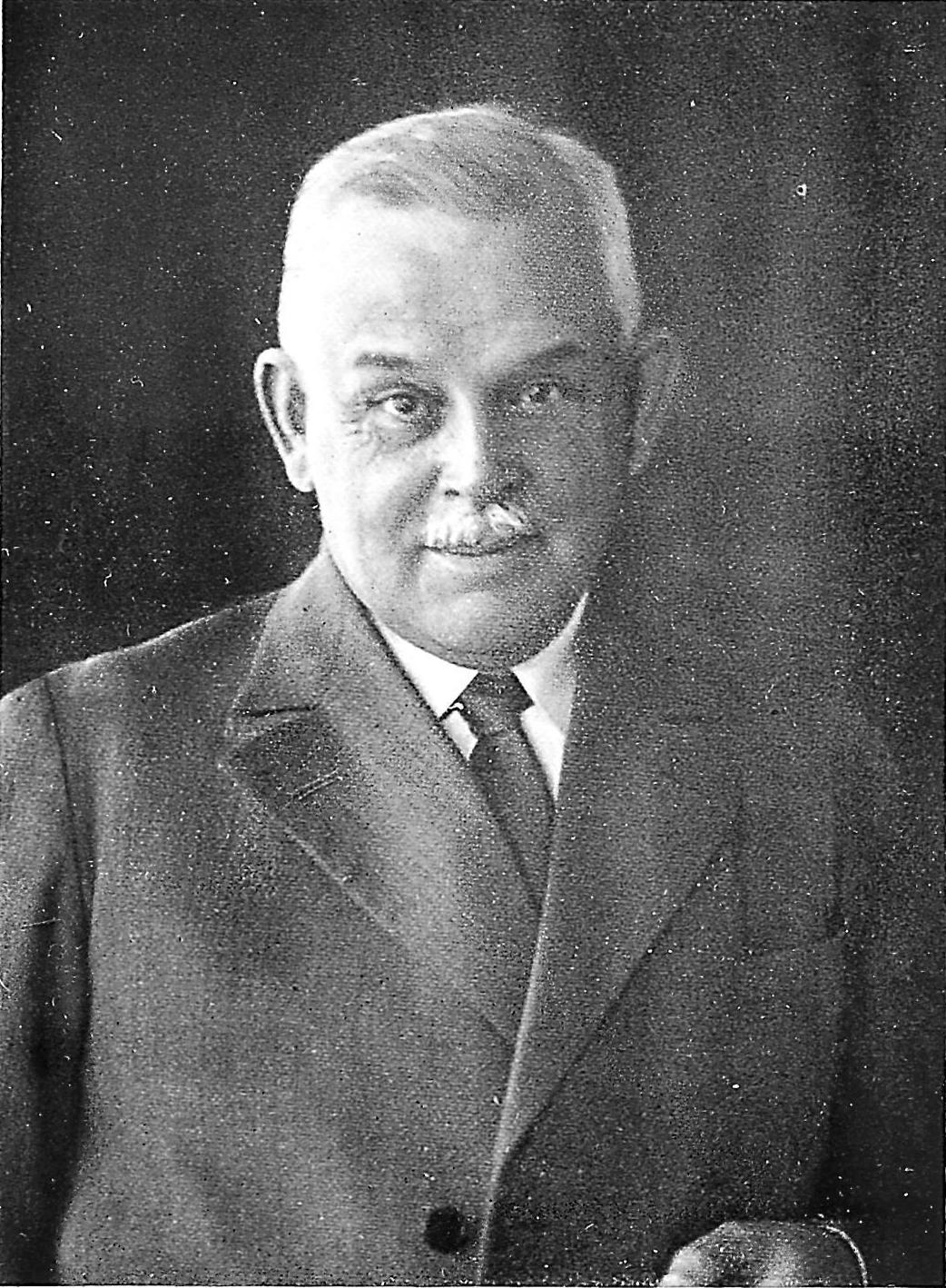
Karl Bonhoeffer (1868–1948)

The Bonhoeffer family is a German family that, though originating in the city of Nijmegen, has been documented in the city of Schwäbisch Hall from 1513 onwards. Among the family's most notable members are Dietrich Bonhoeffer and Klaus Bonhoeffer, both executed in the last days of World War II by Adolf Hitler's government for their different resistance activities against the Nazi régime.

== History ==
Karl Bonhoeffer was born on 31 March 1868 in Neresheim, Württemberg, the son of Friedrich von Bonhoeffer (1828–1907), presiding judge in Ulm, and his wife Julie, née Tafel (1842–1936). He studied medicine at the University of Tübingen, the Friedrich Wilhelm University of Berlin, and the Ludwig-Maximilians-Universität München; in 1892, he obtained his doctorate supervised by Paul Grützner. After working as a physician for several years, he became director of the Breslau psychiatric hospital and also habilitated at the University of Breslau, under Carl Wernicke, in 1897.

In 1898, Bonhoeffer married Paula von Hase (1876–1951), a granddaughter of Protestant theologian Karl Hase (1800–1890). Karl and Paula Bonhoeffer had eight children, whom they educated at home:

- Karl-Friedrich Bonhoeffer (1899–1957) worked as a chemist before and after serving in World War I and was married to Grete von Dohnányi. His son was Johann Friedrich Bonhoeffer (1932–2021) a prominent physicist, biologist, and neuroscientist, and former (since 1972) director at the Max Planck Institute for Developmental Biology. His grandson Tobias Bonhoeffer (born 1960) is a prominent neurobiologist and director at the Max Planck Institute of Neurobiology. His other grandson Sebastian Bonhoeffer is a theoretical biologist and professor at ETH Zurich.
- Walter Bonhoeffer (1899–1918) was killed in action during World War I.
- Klaus Bonhoeffer (1901–1945) became a lawyer but served as a hospital orderly in World War I. He was executed by the Nazis. His wife was Emilie Delbrück, daughter of Hans Delbrück, and sister of Justus Delbrück and Max Delbrück.
- Ursula Schleicher (1902–1983) married lawyer Rüdiger Schleicher (1895–1945), who was executed by the Nazis. Her daughter Renate (born 1925) married theologian Eberhard Bethge (1909–2000), her daughter Dorothee (born 1928) married political scientist Karl Dietrich Bracher (1922–2016).
- Christine von Dohnanyi (1903–1965) married Hans von Dohnányi (1902–1945), brother of Grete von Dohnányi, who was executed by the Nazis. Her sons are politician Klaus von Dohnányi (born 1928) and conductor Christoph von Dohnányi (1929–2025). Her grandson Justus von Dohnányi (born 1960), son of Christoph, became an actor.
- Dietrich Bonhoeffer (1906–1945) became a Lutheran minister; he was engaged to be married to Maria von Wedemeyer (1924–1977) when he was executed by the Nazis.
- Sabine Leibholz-Bonhoeffer (1906–1999), twin sister of Dietrich, married legal scholar Gerhard Leibholz (1901–1982), judge at the Federal Constitutional Court.
- Susanne Dress (1909–1991) married theologian Walter Dress (1904–1979).

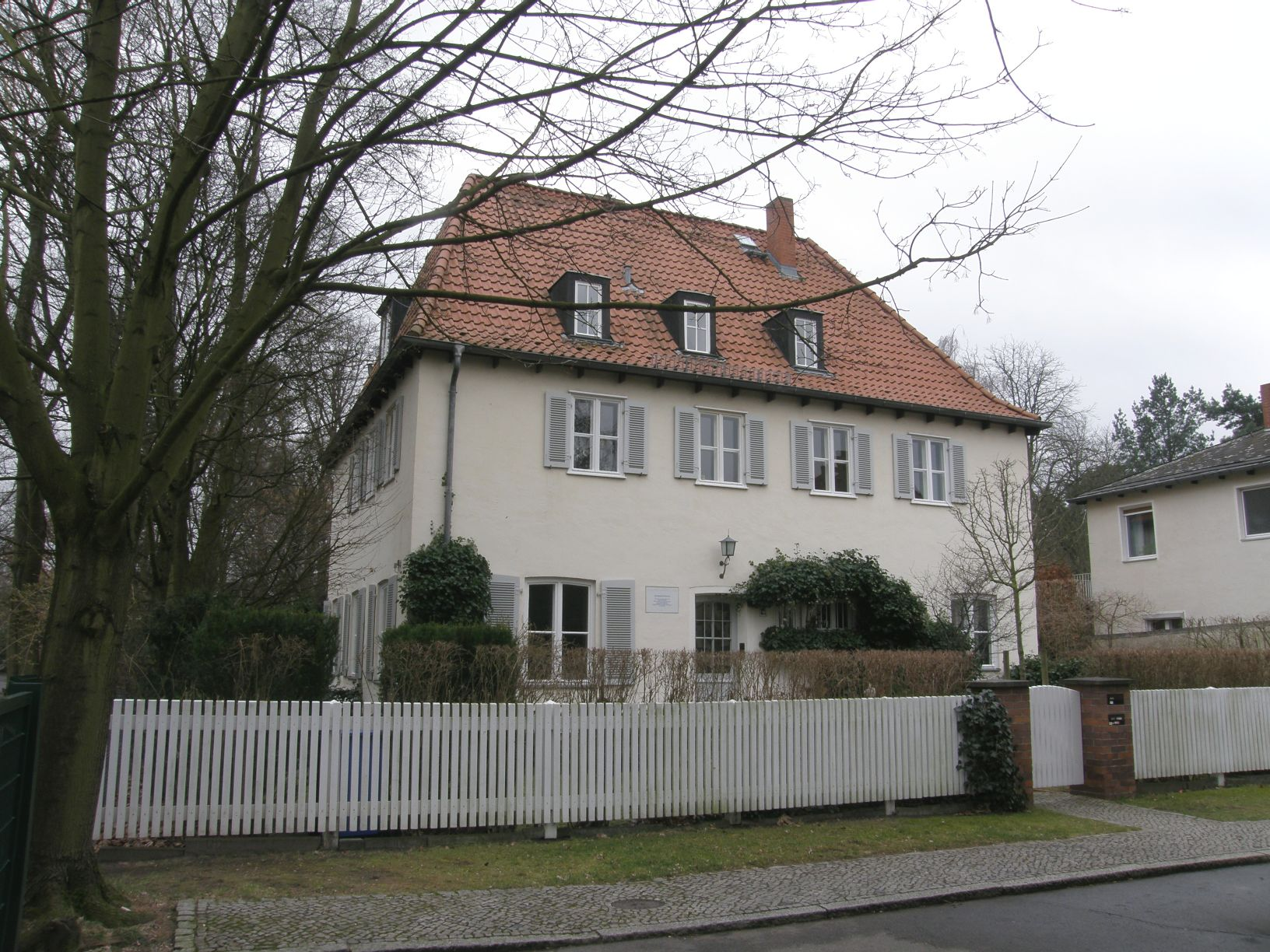
Bonhoeffer family home in Berlin-Westend

In 1912 Karl Bonhoeffer succeeded Theodor Ziehen as professor of psychiatry at the Berlin Charité hospital. He became a prominent psychiatric consultant on culpability and insanity defense, who, after the Reichstag fire of 1933 attested Marinus van der Lubbe's capacity for guilt in the Leipzig Trial. As a follower of Emil Kraepelin, he worked on differential diagnosis to delimit schizophrenia and paranoia from a delirium as organic brain syndrome. He opposed the ideas of Freud and Jung and, although initially in favour of sterilization programmes, it is said he refused to participate in the Nazi-sponsored sterilizations started by the Law for the Prevention of Hereditarily Diseased Offspring enacted in 1933. Karl Bonhoeffer officially retired in March 1936, though he continued to give scientific lectures until 1938. His successor at the Charité Hospital, Max de Crinis, was deeply involved in the Nazi abuse and murders of the Action T4 "euthanasia" programme.

Two sons of the Bonhoeffers and two sons-in-law were executed by the Nazis for their part in the German Resistance. In addition, Paula Bonhoeffer's cousin, Paul von Hase, was also executed for a role in the Resistance, and the couple's daughter, Christel von Dohnanyi, and one grandson-in-law, Eberhard Bethge, were imprisoned by the Nazis but survived. Dietrich, as a Protestant theologian became a member of the Confessing Church, joined the German resistance to fight against the evils of Nazi Germany, was arrested in 1943, and executed on April 9, 1945, at Flossenbürg concentration camp, with his brother-in-law Hans von Dohnányi. Klaus Bonhoeffer and his brother-in-law Rüdiger Schleicher likewise joined the resistance, were arrested, and, with other conspirators of the 20 July plot, found guilty by the "People's Court" (Volksgerichtshof) under presiding judge Roland Freisler on October 2, 1944; they were shot by Gestapo henchmen in the night of April 22–23, 1945, near the ruins of Berlin Lehrter Bahnhof, while Red Army forces entered the city.

Karl Bonhoeffer continued to work as a professor after the war. He died after a stroke on 4 December 1948 in Berlin.
