= Dohnányi family =

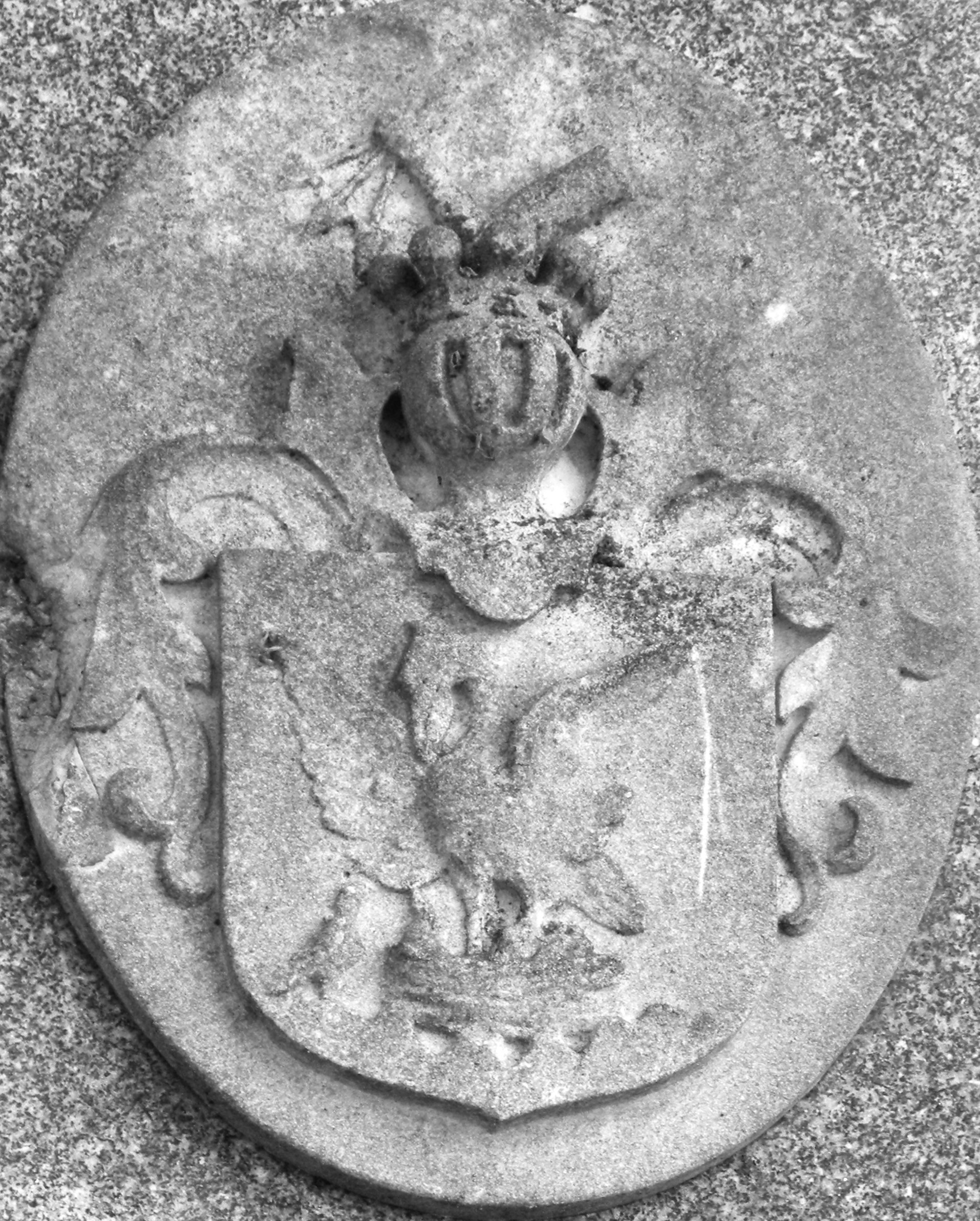
Coat of arms of the Dohnányi family

The Dohnányi family (Hungarian pronunciation: [ˈdohnaːɲi]) is a Hungarian noble family, whose members became noted politicians and musicians related to composer Ernst von Dohnányi. The family also became part of the Austrian nobility, granted to them in 1653 by Ferdinand III, Holy Roman Emperor.

== Notable members ==
- Frederick Dohnányi (Hungarian: Dohnányi Frigyes; 1843–1909), Hungarian professor of mathematics and amateur cellist; father of Ernst
- Ernst von Dohnányi (Hungarian: Dohnányi Ernő; 1877–1960), Hungarian pianist, conductor and composer
- Hans von Dohnanyi (1902–1945), son of Ernst; German jurist and German resistance fighter against the Third Reich
- Klaus von Dohnanyi (born 1928), son of Hans; German politician, mayor of Hamburg
- Christoph von Dohnányi (1929–2025), son of Hans; German conductor
- Justus von Dohnányi (born 1960), son of Christoph; German actor
- Oliver von Dohnányi (born 1955), Slovak conductor, descended from a brother of an eighteenth-century ancestor of Ernő
