= Christoph Bach (actor) =

German actor

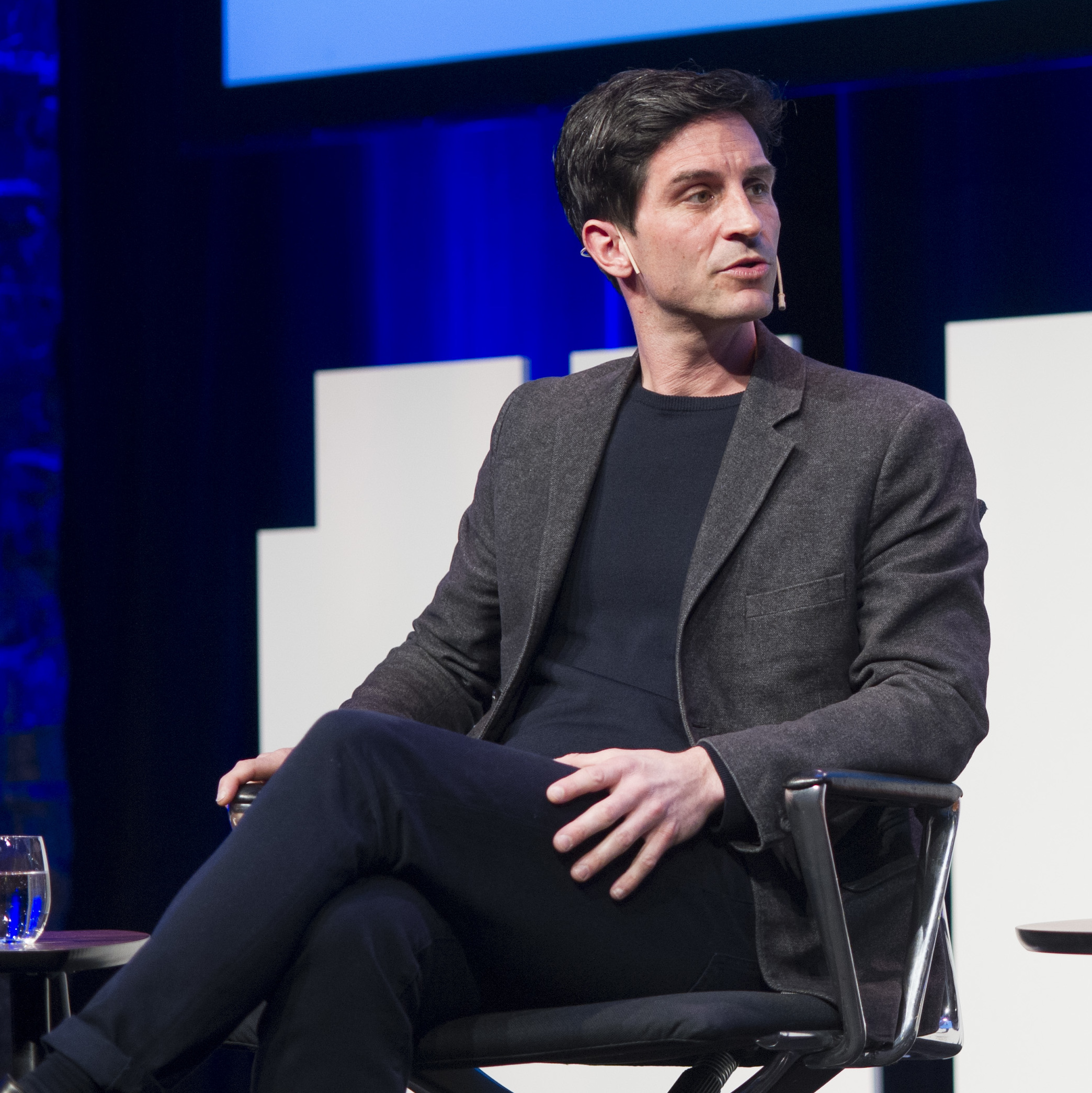
- Bach in 2015
- Born: 1975 (age 50–51)

Christoph Bach (born 1975) is a German actor, living in Berlin. He was born in Reutlingen, and received his education at Universität der Künste in Berlin.

Bach had notable roles in the TV miniseries Carlos and in the German film 15 Minuten Wahrheit. He portrayed Werner Heisenberg in the 2015 TV series The Heavy Water War and, in 2017, German physician Paul Ehrlich in the television series Charité.
