= Operation 7 =

1942 smuggling of German Jews to Switzerland

Operation 7 (Vorgang 7 or Unternehmen U-7) was a clandestine rescue operation conducted from August to September 1942 by members of the German military intelligence service (Abwehr) to smuggle a group of Jews threatened with deportation from Berlin into neutral Switzerland, disguising them as Abwehr agents with forged credentials—one of the few documented successes of the internal German resistance in directly frustrating Nazi racial policy during the Holocaust.

== Background and planning ==
The operation was devised by Abwehr members Hans von Dohnanyi and Wilhelm Canaris, and carried out with the support of Hans Oster, as well as Dohnanyi's brother-in-law Dietrich Bonhoeffer, who arranged visas and sponsors for the Jews. Originally, the plan included only seven Jews, but this was later increased to fourteen. The operation, which involved removing the Jews from deportation lists by making them agents of Abwehr working for Canaris, and persuading Swiss officials to accept them, took over a year to plan and execute. More specifically, Dohnanyi devised a scheme to use them as nominal Abwehr agents ostensibly destined for intelligence work in South America, a cover story calculated to satisfy the Gestapo's jurisdictional boundaries. (Note: Dohnanyi himself traveled secretly to Switzerland to ensure the refugees would be admitted and that funds sufficient for their maintenance had been secured.)

== Exposure and arrests ==
In April 1943, the Gestapo arrested Bonhoeffer and Dohnanyi for their part in the scheme, to which investigators had been alerted by the unauthorized use of Abwehr funds in the operation; Oster, though implicated—he had been observed attempting to pocket compromising documents during the search of Dohnanyi's safe—was progressively sidelined rather than immediately arrested, and released from active service in March 1944. The discovery of the Zossen documents by the Gestapo on 22 September 1944, in the aftermath of the failed July Plot, implicated a widening circle of conspirators; the subsequent recovery of Canaris's personal diary in April 1945 enraged Hitler sufficiently that he ordered the execution of the entire Canaris group. For his part in the general conspiracies against the Nazi regime, Dohnanyi was subjected to a summary "trial" while semi-conscious on a stretcher before his execution on 9 April. (Note: Approximately fifty years after Operation 7, Dohnanyi's son Klaus—with his father's part in the affair expressly in mind—offered what stands as the most fitting epitaph: his father was "an astute conspirator... But above all, he was a sensitive person [Mensch] with an infallible sense for justice and injustice.") On the morning of 9 April 1945—less than a month before Germany's unconditional surrender—Canaris, Oster, Bonhoeffer, and Dohnanyi were all hanged at Flossenbürg.

== Legacy ==
Among the four principals hanged at Flossenbürg on 9 April 1945, only Dohnanyi received the designation of Righteous Among the Nations, recognized posthumously at a ceremony in Berlin on 26 October 2003. Bonhoeffer's involvement in Operation 7 was cited in a petition by Stephen A. Wise—grandson of Rabbi Stephen S. Wise—seeking Bonhoeffer's inclusion on the same list; Yad Vashem declined, determining that the operative criterion of demonstrable mortal risk had not been sufficiently established on the basis of the rescue operation alone.

== Bibliography ==
- German Resistance Memorial Center (2024). "Wilhelm Canaris". Gedenkstätte Deutscher Widerstand. Berlin.
- Glatt, Benjamin (27 October 2016). "The German Officer Who Saved 13 Jewish 'Spies' from the Nazis". The Jerusalem Post.
- Haynes, Stephen R. (2006). The Bonhoeffer Legacy: Post-Holocaust Perspectives. Fortress Press. ISBN 978-0-80063-815-3.
- Hoffmann, Peter (1977). The History of the German Resistance, 1933–1945. Cambridge, MA: MIT Press. ISBN 978-0-26208-088-0.
- Raum, Elizabeth (2002). Dietrich Bonhoeffer: Called by God. Continuum. ISBN 978-0-82641-380-2.
- Rubenstein, Richard L.; Roth, John K. (2003). Approaches to Auschwitz: The Holocaust and Its Legacy. Louisville: Westminster John Knox Press. ISBN 978-0-66422-353-3.
- Schlingensiepen, Ferdinand (2012). Dietrich Bonhoeffer 1906–1945: Martyr, Thinker, Man of Resistance. London: T&T Clark. ISBN 978-0-56749-319-4.
- Sifton, Elisabeth; Stern, Fritz (2013). No Ordinary Men: Dietrich Bonhoeffer and Hans von Dohnanyi. New York Review Books. ISBN 978-1-59017-681-8.
