= The Life of Surgeon Sauerbruch =

1954 film

- Directed by: Rolf Hansen
- Written by: Felix Lützkendorf
- Produced by: Hermann Schwerin
- Starring: Ewald Balser; Heidemarie Hatheyer; Hilde Körber
- Cinematography: Helmut Ashley
- Edited by: Anna Höllering
- Music by: Mark Lothar
- Production companies: Corona Filmproduktion; Bavaria Film
- Distributed by: Schorcht Filmverleih
- Release date: 13 July 1954
- Running time: 100 minutes
- Country: West Germany
- Language: German

The Life of Surgeon Sauerbruch sometimes shortened to Surgeon Sauerbruch (German: Sauerbruch – Das war mein Leben) is a 1954 West German biographical drama film directed by Rolf Hansen and starring Ewald Balser, Heidemarie Hatheyer and Hilde Körber. It was shot at the Bavaria Studios in Munich and on location in West Berlin. It is based on surgeon Ferdinand Sauerbruch's memoirs Das war mein Leben, which were ghostwritten by Hans Rudolf Berndorff and were published in the German magazine Revue shortly before the release of the film. The film was shot from 26 September 1953 to 20 January 1954 in West Berlin, Munich, Frankfurt, and Hamburg. It premiered on 13 July 1954.

== Plot ==
Berlin, 1948: Olga Ahrends collapses in front of a tram/streetcar and is seriously injured. Professor Sauerbruch happens to be walking by and orders her to be admitted to the surgical section of the Charité. However, as the incident is regarded to be an attempted suicide, Olga Ahrends is admitted to the psychiatric section.

A protracted debate ensues between Sauerbruch and the Charité psychiatrist. While the latter diagnoses a falling sickness, Sauerbruch recognizes that Olga Ahrends in fact is suffering from a metabolic disease weakening her bones. Olga Ahrends is in danger of losing her leg but Sauerbruch cures her by removing her parathyroid gland. Olga's treatment at the Charité provides the frame story for a number of episodes from Sauerbruch's life and work, some of them in flashbacks.

During the Bavarian Soviet Republic, he unwaveringly stuck to his professional ethics. As a consequence, he was arrested in order not to be able to help the enemies of the revolution, but was rescued by a young man whose mother Sauerbruch once had operated on. At President Paul von Hindenburgs deathbed, Sauerbruch had to come to terms with the limitations of his profession and he calmed down Hindenburg's fears that, after Hindenburgs death, Adolf Hitler, who had been appointed Chancellor of the German Empire by Hindenburg, would swear the army on himself, by telling Hindenburg that one only is able to decide situationally and that it is always easy for history to judge afterwards.

Another flashback about a Sauerbruch patient is of a more lighthearted nature. A waiter is worried and confused about the costs of surgery but eventually breathes a sigh of relief when he learns that he only has to pay a nominal amount of 1 Mark.

In his spare time, Sauerbruch performs an operation on a male cat because its owner does not believe in veterinarians. Between operations, Sauerbruch gives lectures and administers exams to young physicians, leaving little time for personal life. Mrs. Sauerbruch conforms uncomplainingly to his puritan lifestyle.

In further flashbacks, Sauerbruch tells about his invention, which makes thorax operations possible. During Sauerbruch's years of study, tuberculosis claimed many victims because it was not possible to perform operations on the patients' lungs. When a window in Sauerbruch's house was damaged during a storm, Sauerbruch came up with the idea of an underpressure chamber, the Sauerbruch chamber, which was to equalize pressure during opening the thorax. The first operation on an old woman failed, as she died. The second operation, however, which was performed on a young opera singer, vindicated his idea.

The film also features the Sauerbruch arm, a forearm prothesis designed by Sauerbruch. Sauerbruch's wife presents him to one of his former patients, who has a Sauerbruch arm and is therefore able to perform an organ concerto.

== Cast ==
- Ewald Balser as Prof. Ferdinand Sauerbruch
- Heidemarie Hatheyer as Olga Ahrends
- Maria Wimmer as Mrs. Sauerbruch
- Hilde Körber as Head nurse of the psychiatric section
- Lina Carstens as Head nurse of the surgical section
- Paul Bildt as Postman Wendlandt
- Friedrich Domin as Paul von Hindenburg
- Otto Gebühr as Sauerbruch's assistant
- Ernst Waldow as waiter
- Rudolf Vogel as waiter
- Hans Christian Blech as Worker Brauer
- Charles Regnier as Head of the psychiatric section
- Wilhelm Borchert as railroader Ahrends
- Erich Ponto as Head Physician of the psychiatric section
- Claus Biederstaedt as Political commissar
- Edith Schultze-Westrum as Sauerbruch's secretary
- Paul Westermeier as Driver Elbell
- Kurt Horwitz as Professor Johann von Mikulicz

== Notes ==
Originally, actor O. E. Hasse hoped to play Sauerbruch. Then, however, he was recompensed with the main part in the German 1954 film Canaris.
