= 15 Minuten Wahrheit =

2007 film

- Film poster
- Directed by: Nico Zingelmann
- Written by: Nico Zingelmann
- Produced by: Jean-Young Kwak; Birke Birkner
- Starring: Herbert Knaup; Christoph Bach
- Cinematography: Felix Poplawsky
- Edited by: Marco Baumhof
- Music by: Christopher Bremus
- Release date: January 2007 (Max Ophüls)
- Running time: 18 minutes
- Country: Germany
- Language: German

15 Minuten Wahrheit (German pronunciation: [ˈfʏnftseːn miˈnutn̩ ˈvaːɐ̯haɪt]; lit. '15 minutes of truth') is a German film directed by Nico Zingelmann and starring Herbert Knaup and Christoph Bach.

== Plot ==
50-year-old Georg Komann and his colleagues at Jaffcorp Investment AG are unexpectedly laid off without adequate compensation. They face a highly uncertain future, knowing that no one is hiring new people over 50. Komann forges a risky plan to secure their future livelihood. He puts everything on one card and asks his boss Sebastian Berg for a conversation, one that could change his life - in any direction - a conversation of 15 minutes.

Berg offers Komann a severance payment, which he refuses because he is apparently the only one who is to be lavishly rewarded. He wants to stand up for his colleagues and demands severance payments for all those who are to be laid off, as many are over 50 and no longer have a chance to get a new job. This leaves Berg cold. Komann says the company has stashed away a lot of money in a secret bank account in Switzerland. To put pressure on his young boss, he threatens to go public with this information. Berg does not yield because he believes Komann has no evidence. Komann tells his boss that top management deliberately used him to open the account. This way the board is above suspicion and Berg is the culprit. Komann claims that he and his colleagues have already cleared out the secret account. Berg does not believe him. He has a notebook with the TAN numbers on his desk so that he can carry out transactions. Komann says that he can't memorize anything either, whereupon Berg believes that Komann secretly stole the notebook and photocopied it. In fact, Komann pulls copies out of his jacket pocket. Since the TAN numbers are only valid once, Berg does not worry and secretly alerts security. When Komann leaves the office, Berg has him detained by the security guard.

Berg calls the bank in Zurich to inquire if there have been any transactions in the last 24 hours. The person taking his call says no. Berg then goes into the anteroom, where Komann is in handcuffs, and says with a grin that he almost had him. Komann says that the attempt was worth it. Berg calls Komann a traitor who abused his employer's trust by stealing confidential documents. He says Komann has gambled everything away and no one will hire him anymore. At Berg's instructions, the security guard reaches into Komann's jacket pocket and pulls out the alleged copy of the TAN numbers, which Berg is shocked to find is just a random menu card. In the presence of the security guard, however, Berg pretends that this is really a copy of the TAN numbers and revokes Komann's severance payment because of this breach of trust.

Berg has Komann taken away by security, ready to be handed over to the police. When Berg is back at his desk, he receives a message sent by his secretary in the anteroom. A video opens, recorded by the surveillance camera in the anteroom. The entire conversation was recorded. The video also shows that Berg did not speak to the bank in Zurich, but first to the secretary, who disguised her voice, and then to a Jaffcorp employee who also spoke in a Swiss accent. Berg's call was deliberately diverted by the secretary.

Shortly afterwards, Berg receives a voice mail from Komann; the whole thing was planned by the employees in order to obtain the transaction number that Berg gave on the phone. The employee who posed as a Swiss banker on the phone wrote down this transaction number and called the bank in Switzerland to complete a transaction. Now the employees have the money. Berg then calls the security guard and has Komann released. Komann explains on the voice mail that Berg will get the money back, minus a reasonable compensation for the employees. Only then will they keep the secret. He assures him that he will have a long and prosperous future at Jaffcorp and that he will find a way to discreetly balance the books. Komann, the secretary and the colleague who pretended to be Swiss leave the building and hand in their IDs at the reception counter. The receptionist hands Komann a recording device. On the tape you can hear the voice mail that the receptionist sent to Berg as a recording. He also recorded the conversation in the anteroom.

== Cast ==
- Herbert Knaup as Georg Komann
- Christoph Bach as Sebastian Berg
