= Justus von Dohnányi =

German film and television actor

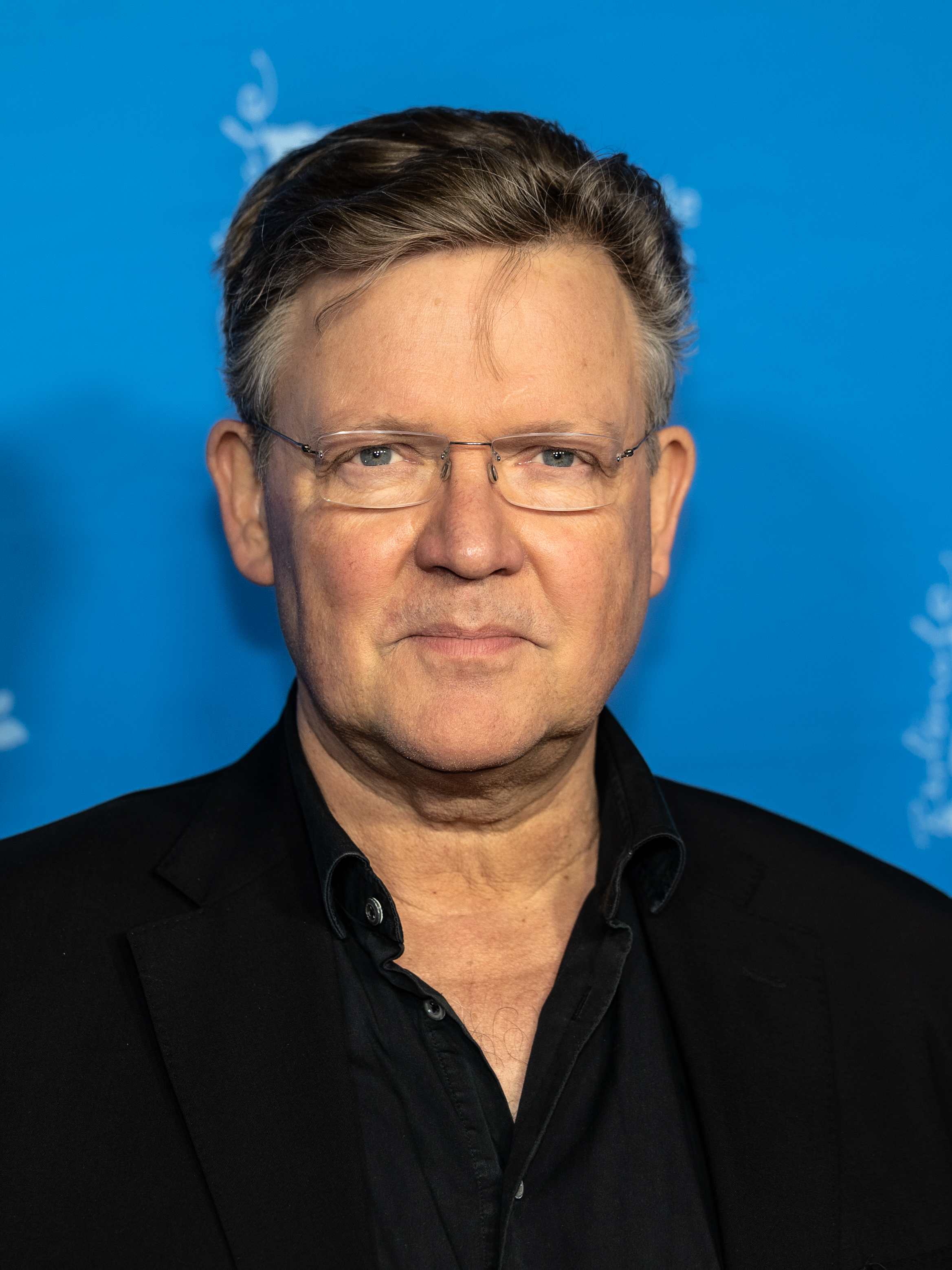
- Von Dohnányi at the Berlin Film Festival 2025
- Born: 2 December 1960 (age 64); Lübeck, West Germany
- Occupation: Actor
- Years active: 1993–present
- Parent(s): Christoph von Dohnányi; Renate Zillessen
- Relatives: Hans von Dohnanyi (grandfather); Dietrich Bonhoeffer (great-uncle)

Justus von Dohnányi (born 2 December 1960) is a German actor, best known for portraying Wilhelm Burgdorf in the 2004 film Downfall.

== Life and career ==
Born in Lübeck, von Dohnányi is the son of conductor Christoph von Dohnányi and actress Renate Zillessen and a member of the well-known Dohnányi family. His grandfather was Hans von Dohnanyi, German jurist and German resistance fighter and his great-uncle was Dietrich Bonhoeffer, Lutheran pastor and a co-founder of the Confessing Church, both of whom were executed by the Third Reich. His great-grandfather was Ernst von Dohnányi, a notable composer of Hungarian origin.

Dohnányi studied acting at the Hochschule für Musik und Theater Hamburg. He appeared on the legitimate stage in Hamburg, Zürich, and Frankfurt before working in television, where he appeared in several television movies.

He appeared in the 2004 film Downfall (German: Der Untergang) as Wilhelm Burgdorf. He had a prominent role in the 2001 movie The Experiment as a prison guard, opposite Moritz Bleibtreu and Christian Berkel, who also appeared in Downfall. He received the 2001 Lola for Best Supporting Actor. In 2014 he appears alongside Matt Damon, Jean Dujardin and others in the movie The Monuments Men. He is featured in the 2015 film Woman in Gold as the representative of the Belvedere Gallery who attempts to keep the title-painting, stolen by the Nazis, from being returned to its rightful owner, Maria Altmann.

== Selected filmography ==
- Jakob the Liar (1999) – Preuss
- The World Is Not Enough (1999) – Captain Nikolai
- Bonhoeffer: Agent of Grace (2000) – Eberhard Bethge
- Das Experiment (2001) – Berus – Strafvollzugsbeamter / Guard
- Amen. (2002) – Göran von Otter
- September (2003) – Philipp Scholz
- Blueprint (2003) – Thomas Weber
- Before the Fall (2004) – Gauleiter Heinrich Stein
- Downfall (2004) – General Wilhelm Burgdorf
- About the Looking for and the Finding of Love (2005) – Harry
- Enigma: An Unacknowledged Love (2005) – Erik Larsen
- Vineta (2006) – Lutz Born
- The Hunt for Troy (2007, TV film) – Oskar Neumann
- GG 19 – Eine Reise durch Deutschland in 19 Artikeln (2007) – Richter (segment "Artikel 5")
- Bis zum Ellenbogen (2007, also director) – Sven Hansen
- Hardcover (2008) – Chico Waidner
- 1½ Knights – In Search of the Ravishing Princess Herzelinde (2008) – Bernd
- Buddenbrooks (2008) – Bendix Grünlich
- Men in the City (2009) – Bruce Berger
- Dr. Hope (2009, TV film) – Otto Walther
- The Day of the Cat (2010) – Magun
- Jew Suss: Rise and Fall (2010) – Veit Harlan
- Life Is Too Long (2010) – Johannes
- Lessons of a Dream (2011) – Richard Hartung
- Men in the City 2 (2011) – Bruce Berger
- Yoko (2012) – Prof. Kellerman
- Glory: A Tale of Mistaken Identities (2012) – Joachim Ebling
- A Coffee in Berlin (2012) – Karl Speckenbach
- Ludwig II (2012) – Johann (Freiherr von) Lutz
- Hanni & Nanni 3 (2013) – Hugh Gordon
- The Wagner-Clan (2013, TV film) – Richard Wagner
- The Monuments Men (2014) – Viktor Stahl
- Frau Müller muss weg! (2015) – Wolf Heider
- Woman in Gold (2015) – Dreimann
- Disaster (2015) – Ed
- Help, I Shrunk My Teacher (2015) – Schulrat Henning
- Der Hund begraben (2016) – Hans
- Timm Thaler oder Das verkaufte Lachen (2017) – Baron Lefuet
- Charité (2017, TV series, 6 episodes) – Robert Koch
- Teenosaurus Rex (2017) – Ulrich Dattelmann
- How About Adolf? (2018) – René König
- Lassie Come Home (2020) – Butler Gerhardt
- Locked-in Society (2022) – Klaus Engelhardt
- Family Affairs (2022) – René König
