= Christoph von Dohnányi =

German conductor (1929–2025)

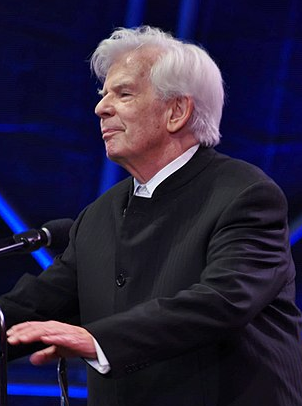
- Dohnányi in 2016
- Born: 8 September 1929; Berlin, Brandenburg, Prussia, Weimar Germany
- Died: 6 September 2025 (aged 95); Munich, Bavaria, Germany
- Education: Hochschule für Musik und Theater München
- Occupation: Conductor
- Spouses: Renate Zillessen; Anja Silja; Barbara Koller (m. 2004)
- Children: 5, including Justus
- Parents: Hans von Dohnanyi (father); Christine von Dohnanyi (mother)
- Family: Klaus von Dohnanyi (brother); Dohnányi family

Christoph von Dohnányi (German: [ˈkʁɪstɔf fɔn ˈdɔxnaːnjiː]; (Note: In contrast to his father Hans and his brother Klaus, who used the German pronunciation: [doːˈna.niː], Christoph and his son Justus prefer the more Hungarian pronunciation.) 8 September 1929 – 6 September 2025) was a German conductor. He was music director and later artistic director at the Oper Frankfurt until 1977, establishing innovative opera. He was music director of the Cleveland Orchestra from 1984 to 2002, leading the orchestra in recordings with various labels and on international tours to Europe and Asia. He was principal conductor of London's Philharmonia Orchestra from 1997 to 2008, touring Europe including a series of opera performances at the Théâtre du Châtelet in Paris. He was chief conductor of the NDR Symphony Orchestra from 2004 to 2010.

== Life and career ==
=== Youth, World War II and education ===
Dohnányi was born on 8 September 1929 in Berlin to Hans von Dohnanyi, a German jurist of Hungarian ancestry, and Christine Bonhoeffer. His uncle on his mother's side, and also his godfather, was Dietrich Bonhoeffer, a Lutheran pastor, theologian and ethicist. His grandfather was the pianist and composer Ernst von Dohnányi. His father, uncle and other family members participated in the German Resistance movement against Nazism, and were arrested and detained in several Nazi concentration camps before being executed in 1945, when Christoph was 15 years old. Dohnányi's older brother is Klaus von Dohnanyi, a German politician and former mayor of Hamburg.

After World War II, Dohnányi studied law in Munich, but in 1948, he transferred to the Hochschule für Musik und Theater München to study composition, piano and conducting. At the Bavarian State Opera in Munich, he was a stage extra, a house pianist, and coached singers. He received the Richard Strauss Prize from the city of Munich, and then went to Florida State University to study with his grandfather.

=== Germany, opera in Lübeck, Kassel, Frankfurt and Hamburg ===
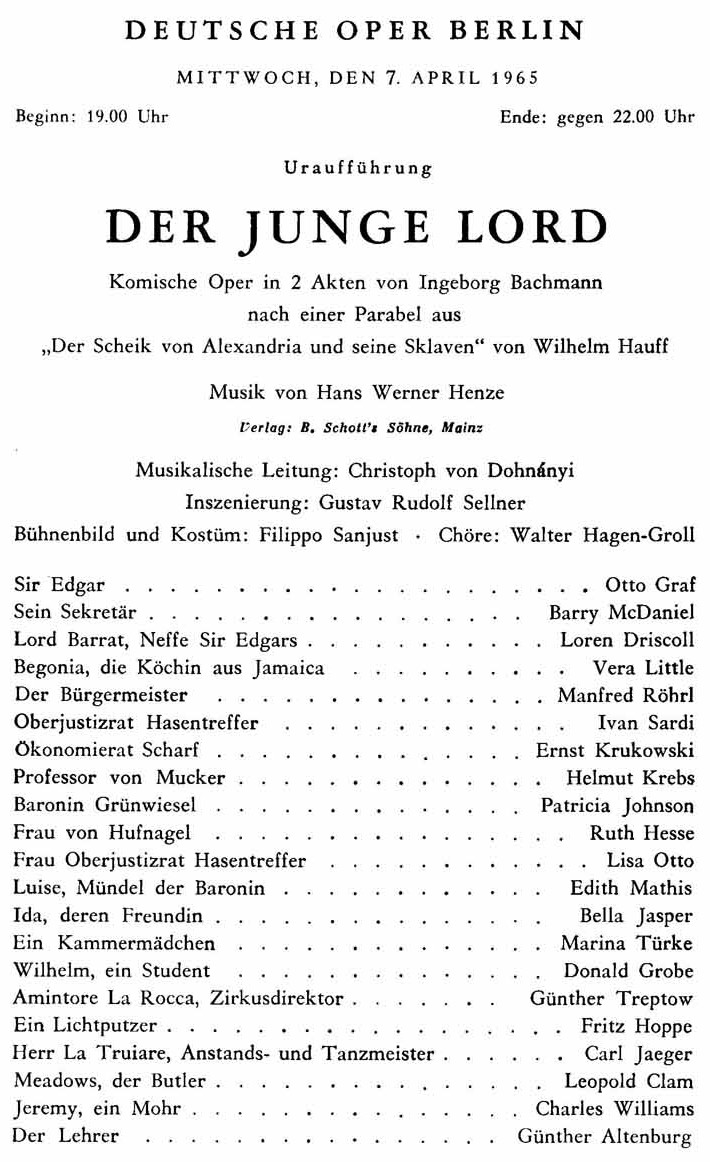
Playbill for the premiere of Henze's Der junge Lord on 7 April 1965 at the Deutsche Oper Berlin

Dohnányi's first position as assistant was at the Oper Frankfurt, appointed by Georg Solti, where he also served as a ballet and opera coach. He was general musical director (GMD) of the Lübeck Opera from 1957 to 1963, then Germany's youngest GMD. In 1965, Dohnányi conducted the world premiere of Henze's Der junge Lord at the Deutsche Oper Berlin. He was GMD of the Staatstheater Kassel, where he revived Schreker's Der ferne Klang, which had been suppressed by the Nazis. He was at the same time chief conductor of the WDR Symphony Orchestra Cologne. In 1968, he became GMD at the Oper Frankfurt, succeeded Lovro von Matačić, and later also artistic director, serving in both capacities until 1977. His team included dramaturges Gerard Mortier, Peter Mario Katona (Director of Casting at ROH Covent Garden) and Klaus Schultz. They programmed a balance of traditional opera performance and innovative Musiktheater and Regietheater. He was convinced that the dramatic aspect of opera had been neglected, and engage directors from theatre and film including András Fricsay, Klaus Michael Grüber, Hans Neuenfels and Volker Schlöndorff. He won Henze to direct a production of Der junge Lord in Frankfurt. Oper Frankfurt was established as a leading opera house, and the city prepared for the Gielen era that followed. Dohnányi worked as GMD and intendant at the Hamburg State Opera from 1977 to 1984. He tried a similar concept as in Frankfurt, but faced structural problems. His time of posts at opera houses ended, but he kept conducting opera as a guest at the Metropolitan Opera, the Vienna State Opera, the Royal Opera House in London, the Opernhaus Zürich and the Salzburg Festival.

=== Cleveland Orchestra ===
Dohnányi made his conducting debut with the Cleveland Orchestra in December 1981 and was named "Music Director Designate" the following year. However, he would not begin his tenure as music director until 1984. During the intervening two years, the orchestra invited a number of guest conductors to lead the ensemble, including former music director Erich Leinsdorf for six weeks of subscription concerts. Leinsdorf would remark that he was the "bridge between the regimes." Before taking the podium as the orchestra's sixth music director, Dohnányi made guest appearances with other American orchestras, including those in Detroit, Pittsburgh, and New York City, as well as leading the Cleveland Orchestra in its annual gala concert and recordings at Severance Hall. As Dohnányi began his first season as music director, he brought with him contacts that would push the orchestra forward with a variety of recording projects. Near the end of the 1984–85 season, Dohnányi announced that the Cleveland Orchestra would use its summer home, Blossom Music Center, to perform a staged opera: Mozart's The Magic Flute. The production, which was attended by 15,000 people, was labeled "the Ohio musical event of the summer" by The Columbus Dispatch. The following summer, he conducted there Lehar's The Merry Widow in a co-production with La Monnaie with Anja Silja, his wife, in the title role. Dohnányi also oversaw the hiring of Indonesian-born conductor Jahja Ling, who would lead the newly-established Cleveland Orchestra Youth Orchestra, which had its first concert in February 1987.

He made recordings a hallmark of his tenure, associated with several labels (Teldec, Decca, and Telarc). Live recordings began with Schoenberg's Die Jakobsleiter in 1984 and ended with Lutoslawski's Musique funèbre in 2001. They recorded more than 100 works, programming music from the late 18th century to new commissions. They performed concert performances of operas including Beethoven's Fidelio and Berg's Wozzeck.

Dohnányi also focused on international touring. In 1986, the orchestra embarked on its sixth tour of Europe and its first international tour under Dohnányi, performing twenty-one concerts in seventeen cities across Western Europe. They toured to Europe or East Asia nearly every season, including to the Salzburg Festival, regularly from 1990, The Edinburgh Festival, the Lucerne Festival, and the BBC Proms. He hired new orchestra members, and had to find a replacement for Robert Page, who had been the longtime director of the Cleveland Orchestra Chorus. Leonard Slatkin, the former music director of the St. Louis Symphony, was appointed Blossom Festival Director beginning in the summer of 1991.

To celebrate the Cleveland Orchestra's 75th anniversary, Dohnányi led performances of Wagner's Ring cycle at Severance Hall during the 1992–93 and 1993–94 seasons. Although the ensemble's intention was to become the first symphony orchestra in the United States to record the four-part, fifteen-hour musical monument, financial restrictions limited to recording only the first two, Das Rheingold and Die Walküre.

In 1992, Dohnányi signed a contract that extended his tenure as music director through the 1999–2000 season. A few years later, the orchestra began a fundraising campaign for the renovation of Severance Hall, which included the replacement of the "Szell Shell" and the return of the E.M. Skinner organ to the stage. Dohnányi signed his final contract in 1997, extending his tenure until 2002. The orchestra toured China for the first time in 1998. During the spring of 1999, the orchestra moved to Cleveland's Playhouse Square for a residency at the Allen Theatre while Severance Hall was renovated. On 8 January 2000, Dohnányi led a gala concert to celebrate the re-opening of Severance Hall, which was broadcast live on local television by Cleveland's WVIZ. When his contract expired, Dohnányi was named music director laureate of the Cleveland Orchestra.

=== Philharmonia Orchestra ===
In 1994, Dohnányi became the principal guest conductor of London's Philharmonia Orchestra, and in 1997 their principal conductor. In April 2007, Dohnányi was one of eight conductors of British orchestras to endorse the 10-year classical music outreach manifesto, "Building on Excellence: Orchestras for the 21st Century", to increase the presence of classical music in the UK, including giving free entry to all British schoolchildren to a classical music concert. In 2008, he stepped down from the post and held the title of the orchestra's "Honorary Conductor for Life". With the Philharmonia Orchestra, Dohnányi performed throughout Europe at such venues as the Musikverein in Vienna, the Salzburg Festival, Amsterdam's Concertgebouw, the Lucerne Festival, and the Théâtre des Champs Elysées in Paris. For several seasons, Dohnányi and the Philharmonia Orchestra were in residence at the Théâtre du Châtelet in Paris, performing new productions of Richard Strauss's operas Arabella, Die Frau ohne Schatten and Die schweigsame Frau, Schoenberg's Moses und Aron, Stravinsky's Oedipus rex and Humperdinck's Hänsel und Gretel. At the Opernhaus Zürich, Dohnányi led new productions of Moses and Aron, Oedipus Rex (with Bartók's Bluebeard's Castle, Die schweigsame Frau, Ariadne auf Naxos, Salome, Elektra, and Die Frau ohne Schatten, Mozart's Idomeneo, Verdi's Un ballo in maschera, and Wagner's Der fliegende Holländer.

=== Later engagements ===
Following his retirement from the Cleveland Orchestra, Dohnányi was a guest conductor with the Boston Symphony, frequently at the Tanglewood Music Festival, New York Philharmonic, Philadelphia Orchestra, Pittsburgh Symphony, Chicago Symphony, and Los Angeles Philharmonic, as well as the Cleveland Orchestra. A regular collaboration between Dohnányi and the Israel Philharmonic Orchestra developed in the 1990s. He was a frequent guest conductor with the Vienna Philharmonic both in concert and at the Vienna State Opera.

In 2004, Dohnányi returned to Hamburg where he had maintained a residence, to become chief conductor of the NDR Symphony Orchestra. He concluded his tenure after the 2009–10 season. He promoted the building of the Elbphilharmonie and was the designated conductor of the opening, but it was not completed during his tenure.

=== Personal life and death ===
Dohnányi was married to the German actress Renate Zillessen; they had two children, Katja and Justus. His second wife was the German soprano Anja Silja; they had three children: Julia, Benedikt, and Olga. From 2004 until his death, Dohnányi was married to Barbara Koller, a violist and his former assistant.

Dohnányi died in Munich on 6 September 2025, two days before his 96th birthday.

== Awards ==
- Torch of Freedom Award
- Bartók medal
- Order of Merit of the Federal Republic of Germany
- Ordre des Arts et des Lettres
- 1979 Goethe Plaque of the City of Frankfurt
- 2020 Johannes Brahms Medal

=== Honorary doctorates ===
- Eastman School of Music
- Oberlin Conservatory of Music
- Cleveland Institute of Music
- Kent State University
- Case Western Reserve University
- Royal Academy of Music
- Hebrew Union College

== Assistants to Christoph von Dohnányi ==
Michael Stern, music director and lead conductor of the Kansas City Symphony, was assistant conductor to Dohnányi from 1986 to 1991 at the Cleveland Orchestra. Alan Gilbert, former music director of the New York Philharmonic, was assistant conductor to Dohnányi from 1995 to 1997 at the Cleveland Orchestra. Alejo Pérez was assistant conductor at the NDR Symphony Orchestra from 2005 to 2007 and Jens Georg Bachmann, artistic director and chief conductor of the Cyprus Symphony Orchestra was in the same position at the NDR Symphony Orchestra from 2007 to 2009.

== Sources ==
- Donald Rosenberg (2000). The Cleveland Orchestra Story. Cleveland, Ohio: Gray & Company. ISBN 1-886228-24-8.
- Klaus Schultz (ed.), Offen sein zu – hören. Der Dirigent Christoph von Dohnányi. Hamburg: Murmann 2010, 281 p. ISBN 978-3-86774-074-6 [The book contains a discography.]

Cultural offices
Preceded by ?	General Music Director, Theater Lübeck; 1957–1963	Succeeded by Gerd Albrecht
Preceded by Paul Schmitz	General Music Director, Staatstheater Kassel; 1963–1966	Succeeded by Gerd Albrecht
Preceded by none	Principal Conductor, WDR Symphony Orchestra, Cologne; 1964–1970	Succeeded by Zdeněk Mácal
Preceded by Lovro von Matačić	General Music Director and Chief Intendant, Frankfurt Opera; 1968–1977	Succeeded by Michael Gielen
Preceded by August Everding	Intendant and Chief Conductor, Hamburgische Staatsoper; 1977–1984	Succeeded by Kurt Horres
Preceded by Lorin Maazel	Music Director Designate, Music Director, Cleveland Orchestra; 1982–2002	Succeeded by Franz Welser-Möst
Preceded by Giuseppe Sinopoli	Principal Guest Conductor, Principal Conductor and Artistic Adviser, Philharmonia Orchestra; 1994–2008	Succeeded by Esa-Pekka Salonen
Preceded by Christoph Eschenbach	Chief Conductor, NDR Symphony Orchestra; 2004–2010	Succeeded by Thomas Hengelbrock
