= Ferdinand Sauerbruch =

German surgeon (1875–1951)

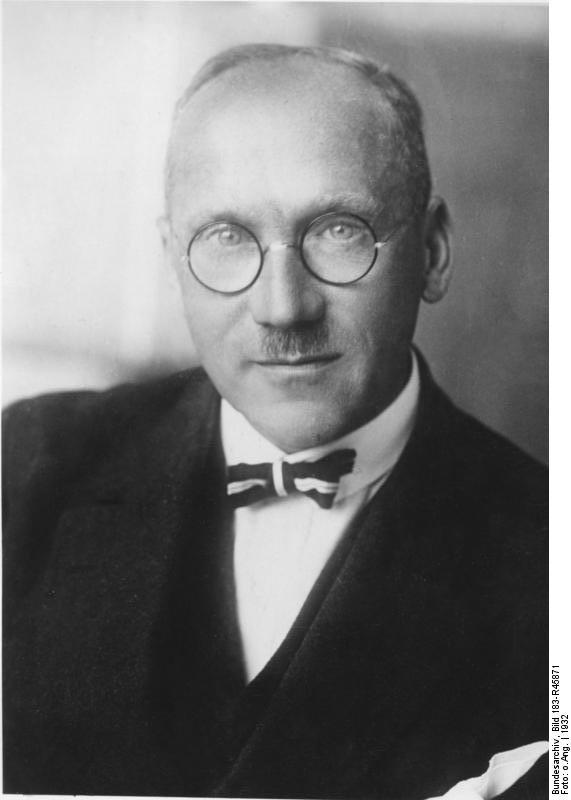
- Born: Ernst Ferdinand Sauerbruch; 3 July 1875; Barmen, German Empire
- Died: 2 July 1951 (aged 75); East Berlin, East Germany
- Education: Marburg University; University of Greifswald; University of Jena; Leipzig University
- Known for: Sauerbruch chamber
- Relatives: Peter Sauerbruch (son)
- Awards: German National Prize for Art and Science 1937

Ernst Ferdinand Sauerbruch (German: [ˈzaʊ.ɐˌbʁʊx]; 3 July 1875 – 2 July 1951) was a German surgeon. His major work was on the use of negative-pressure chambers for surgery.

== Biography ==
Sauerbruch was born in Barmen (now a district of Wuppertal), Germany. He studied medicine at Marburg University, the University of Greifswald, the University of Jena, and Leipzig University, from the last of which he graduated in 1902. He went to Breslau in 1903, where he developed the Sauerbruch chamber, a pressure chamber for operating on the open thorax, which he demonstrated in 1904. This invention was a breakthrough in thorax medicine and allowed heart and lung operations to take place at greatly reduced risk. In 1910, he was appointed professor of surgery in Zürich, where he could finally build his own negative pressure chamber at the University Hospital of Zürich. During World War I, he was partially on leave to work as a battlefield surgeon in Germany. At this time, he developed several new types of limb prostheses in collaboration with Aurel Stodola of ETH Zurich, which for the first time enabled simple movements to be executed with the remaining muscle of the patient.

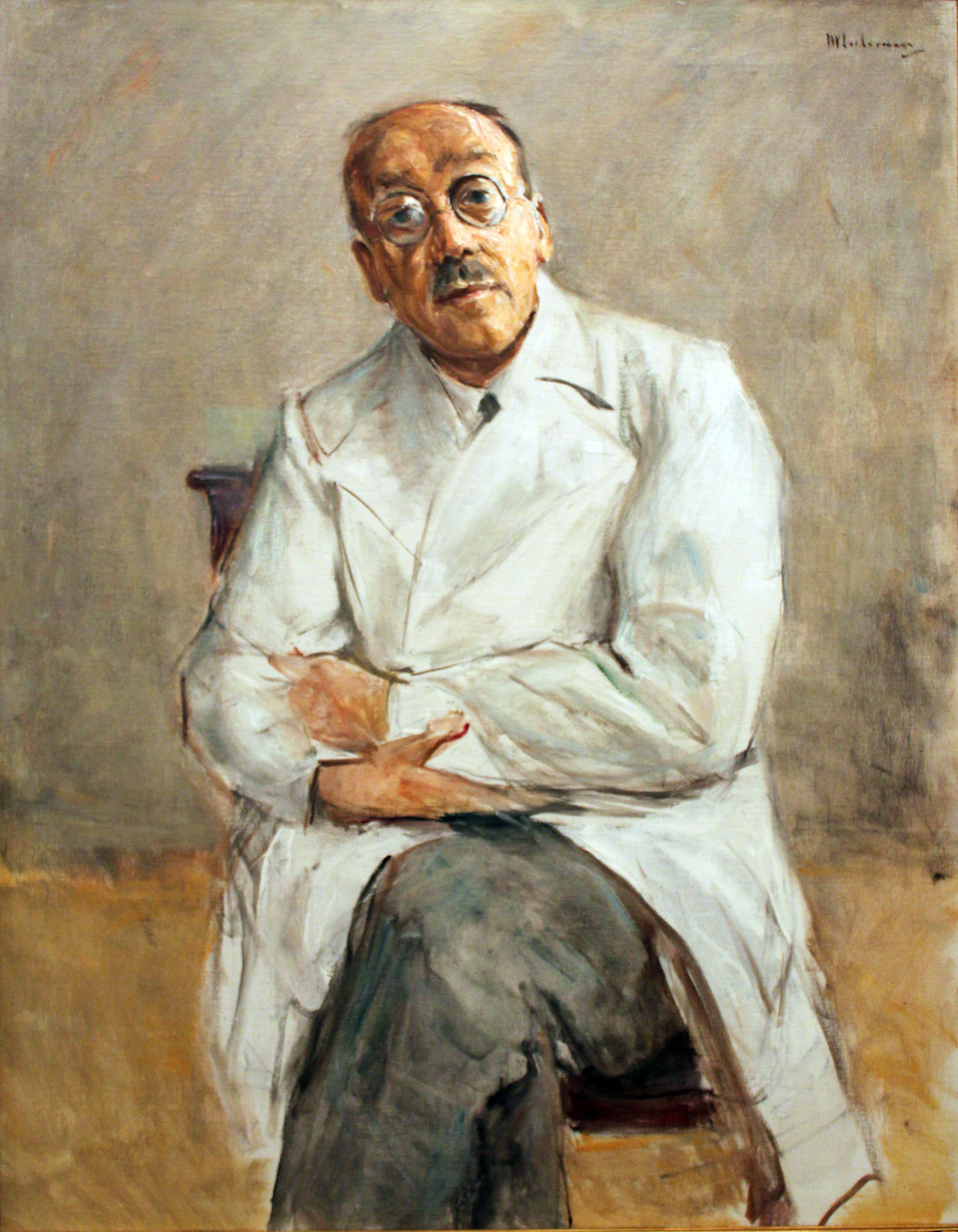
Max Liebermann: Ferdinand Sauerbruch (1932), Hamburger Kunsthalle

From 1918 to 1927, Sauerbruch worked at the Ludwig-Maximilians-Universität München on surgical techniques and diets for treating tuberculosis. From 1928 to 1949, he was the head of the surgical department at the Charité in Berlin, attaining international fame for his operations. Because of his experience and skill, he quickly attained an international reputation and operated on many prominent patients. At the same time, he was well known for his dedication to all patients independent of their social, political or ethnic backgrounds.

Before World War II, the German Government awarded Sauerbruch the German National Prize for Art and Science. Sauerbruch's position towards the Nazi government is still the subject of debate. In his position, he was clearly in contact with the political elite, but he was never a member of the NSDAP. However, he did support the political objectives of the NSDAP and encouraged other scientists to join it. In 1935, Prussian Minister President Hermann Göring appointed him to the Prussian State Council, and he remained a member through the end of the Nazi regime. He was a fervent nationalist who wanted to undo the "humiliation of Versailles" and was keen to show off his country as an advanced and sophisticated society. While he had accepted the German Nationalpreis, a short-lived German alternative to the Nobel Prize, it is said he also publicly spoke out for people who were persecuted (e.g. the Impressionist painter Max Liebermann). He was part of the so-called Mittwochsgesellschaft (de) (Wednesday Society), a group of scientists that included critical voices; and after 20 July 1944 he was arrested and interrogated by the Gestapo because his son Peter had ties to Claus von Stauffenberg.

In 1937, he became a member of the newly established Reich Research Council that supported "research projects" of the SS, including experiments on prisoners in the concentration camps. As head of the General Medicine Branch of the RRC, it was alleged that he personally approved the funds which financed August Hirt's experiments with mustard gas on prisoners at Natzweiler concentration camp from 1941 until 1944. However, he was one of the few university professors who publicly spoke out against the NS-Euthanasia program T4. In 1942, he became Surgeon General to the army. In mid-September 1943, Sauerbruch was awarded the Knight's Cross of the War Merit Cross with Swords. On 12 October 1945, he was charged by the Allies for having contributed to the Nazi dictatorship, but acquitted for lack of evidence.

Sauerbruch continued hospital surgery throughout the whole war; his operating theatre was taken by the Red Army in 1945. Late in life, he developed dementia and was dismissed from the Charité because he continued to perform surgeries on patients, some with uncertain results. His colleagues detected the errors but were unable to stop him because of his fame and power.

Sauerbruch died in East Berlin at the age of seventy-five. He is buried at Wannsee. A high school in Grossröhrsdorf, Saxony, bears his name.

Portrayals in Media

Sauerbruch's life was portrayed in the German 1954 film Sauerbruch – Das war mein Leben, which is based on his memoirs Das war mein Leben (This Was My Life), although the validity of these memoirs (written by the journalist Hans Rudolf Berndorff) is contested by Sauerbruch's disciple Rudolf Nissen.

The second season of the German series Charité at War depicts the workings of the Charité under Sauerbruch's leadership during World War II and the impact of the contemporary political climate on the hospital staff.

== Children ==
His eldest son Hans Sauerbruch (1910–1996) became a painter; he lived in Berlin, Rome and after the war in Konstanz where his son, the architect Matthias Sauerbruch, was born.

Sauerbruch's second son, Friedrich Sauerbruch (born 1911), was a surgeon as well. He assisted his father and was actually responsible for the termination of his father's activities at the Charité (which had become too risky due to his illness). He lived in Berlin and later in Moers.

The third son Peter Sauerbruch (5 June 1913 – 29 September 2010) was a recipient of the Knight's Cross of the Iron Cross on 4 January 1943 as a Hauptmann in the general staff of the 14th Panzer Division and leader of a Kampfgruppe "Sauerbruch". He lived in Hamburg and Munich.

== Bibliography ==
- Ferdinand Sauerbruch: Das war mein Leben, Autobiography, 639 pages, Kindler u. Schiermeyer 1951
- Dewey, Marc; Schagen, Udo; Eckart, Wolfgang U.; Schönenberger, Eva (2006). "Ernst Ferdinand Sauerbruch and His Ambiguous Role in the Period of National Socialism". Annals of Surgery. 244 (2): 315–321. doi:10.1097/01.sla.0000218191.68016.cf. PMC 1602148. PMID 16858197.
- Friedolf Kudlien und Christian Andree: Sauerbruch und der Nationalsozialismus. Medizinhistorisches Journal, Band 15, 1980
- Rudolf Nissen, Helle Blätter, dunkle Blätter, Erinnerungen eines Chirurgen, Page 142 ff.
- Rolf Winau, Die Berliner Charité als Zentrum der Chirurgie: Ferdinand Sauerbruchs Lebensleistung und sein Verhältnis zum Nationalsozialismus aus Meilensteine der Medizin, Hrsg Heinz Schott, 1996
