= Hans von Dohnanyi =

German jurist and resistance fighter (1902–1945)

- Hans von Dohnányi
- Born: 1 January 1902; Vienna, Austria-Hungary
- Died: 8/9 April 1945 (aged 43); Sachsenhausen concentration camp, Nazi Germany
- Occupation: Jurist
- Spouse: Christel Bonhoeffer
- Children: Klaus von Dohnanyi; Christoph von Dohnányi; Barbara von Dohnanyi-Bayer
- Relatives: Dietrich Bonhoeffer (brother-in-law)

Hans von Dohnanyi (German: [hans fɔn doːˈna.niː]]; originally Johann von Dohnányi Hungarian: [ˈdohnaːɲi]; 1 January 1902 – 8 or 9 April 1945) was a German jurist. He used his position in the Abwehr to help Jews escape Germany, worked with German resistance against the Nazi régime, and after the failed 20 July Plot, he was accused of being the "spiritual leader" of the conspiracy to assassinate Hitler, and executed by the SS in 1945.

== Early life ==
Hans von Dohnanyi was born to the Hungarian composer Ernő Dohnányi and his wife, pianist Elisabeth Kunwald. After his parents divorced, he grew up in Berlin. He went to the Grunewald Gymnasium there, becoming friends with Dietrich and Klaus Bonhoeffer. From 1920 to 1924, he studied law in Berlin. In 1925, he received a doctorate in law with a dissertation on "The International Lease Treaty and Czechoslovakia's Claim on the Lease Area in Hamburg Harbour".

After taking the first state exam in 1924, he married Christel Bonhoeffer, daughter of Karl Bonhoeffer and sister of his school friends, in 1925. About this time, he began putting the word stress on the "a" in his last name (which is of Hungarian origin, where it is stressed on the first syllable), and removed the acute accent (which indicates vowel length, not word stress, in Hungarian). He and his wife had three children: Klaus (mayor of Hamburg from 1981 to 1988), Christoph, (an orchestra conductor) and Barbara.

== Career ==
Dohnányi worked at the Hamburg Senate for a short time and in 1929, began a career at the Reich Ministry of Justice, working as a personal consultant with the title of prosecutor to several justice ministers. In 1934, the title was changed to Regierungsrat ("government councillor"). In 1932, he was adjutant to Erwin Bumke, the Reich Court President (Reichsgerichtspräsident) in which capacity he put together Prussia's lawsuit against the national government, which Prussia had brought after the Preußenschlag, Franz von Papen's dissolution of the Prussian social-democratic government through an emergency decree in 1932. As an adviser to Franz Gürtner from 1934 to 1938, Dohnányi became acquainted with Adolf Hitler, Joseph Goebbels, Heinrich Himmler and Hermann Göring. He had access to the justice ministry's most secret documents.

== Resistance ==
Spurred by the murders of alleged plotters of the 1934 Night of the Long Knives, "legitimised" murders carried out on government orders, without trial or sentence, Dohnányi began to seek out contacts with German resistance circles. Thereafter, he systematically compiled what became known as the Zossen documents—a clandestine archive of Nazi crimes and coup-planning materials stored in a safe at the OKH headquarters complex at Zossen, intended both to facilitate postwar prosecutions and to document the non-military resistance's role in the event of a successful coup.. In 1938, once his critical view of Nazi racial politics became known, Martin Bormann had him transferred to the Reichsgericht in Leipzig as an adviser.

Shortly before the outbreak of World War II, Hans Oster called Dohnányi into the Abwehr of the Oberkommando der Wehrmacht. Led by Wilhelm Canaris, it quite quickly became a hub of resistance activity against Hitler. Dohnányi protected Dietrich Bonhoeffer from conscription by bringing him into the Abwehr with the claim Bonhoeffer's numerous ecumenical contacts could be useful for Germany.

In 1942, Dohnányi made it possible for two Jewish lawyers from Berlin, Friedrich Arnold and Julius Fliess, to flee with their loved ones to Switzerland, disguised as Abwehr agents. Altogether, 13 people were able to leave Germany without hindrance, thanks to Dohnányi's forgeries and operation known as U-7. Dohnányi covertly went to Switzerland to make certain the refugees would be admitted. He also ensured they received money to support themselves.

During late February 1943, Dohnányi busied himself with Henning von Tresckow's assassination attempt against Hitler and the attempted coup d'état. The bomb that was smuggled aboard Hitler's plane in Smolensk after being carried there by Dohnányi, however, failed to go off.

On 5 April 1943, Dohnányi was arrested at his office by the Gestapo on charges of alleged breach of foreign currency violations: he had transferred funds to a Swiss bank on behalf of the Jews he had saved. Among the transactions in question were ones with Jauch & Hübener. Both Bonhoeffer and Christel Dohnányi were also arrested, although she was released about a month later.

Military judge Karl Sack, himself a member of the resistance, deliberately delayed Dohnányi's trial; however, in 1944, Dohnányi was delivered to Sachsenhausen concentration camp. His involvement in the 20 July Plot came to light after the plan failed. Also, the Gestapo found some of the documents he had earlier saved and hidden and decided Dohnányi was "the spiritual head of the conspiracy” against Hitler. On Hitler's orders, on 6 April 1945, he was condemned to death by an SS drumhead court and executed two or three days later (depending on the source).

== Proceedings after the war ==
After the fall of the Nazi régime, the chairman of the drumhead court, Otto Thorbeck, and the prosecutor, Walter Huppenkothen, were accused in West Germany of being accessories to murder. After the Bundesgerichtshof (BGH) had at first quashed a lower court's two acquittals, it changed its mind in 1956 during the third revision of the case, quashed Thorbeck's and Huppenkothen's sentences, and acquitted them of the charges of being accessories to murder by their participation in the drumhead trial on grounds that the court had been duly constituted and the sentence had been imposed according to the law then in force, without either of the accused having perverted justice.

On the centenary of Dohnányi's birth in 2002, Günter Hirsch, president of the BGH, called those who had sentenced Dohnányi to death "criminals calling themselves judges". Hirsch said the 1956 ruling was shameful because as a result, not a single one of the Nazi-era judges who sentenced 50,000 Nazi opponents to their deaths was found guilty after the war.

On 23 October 2003, Israel honoured Dohnányi by recognizing him as one of the Righteous Among the Nations for saving the Arnold and Fliess families, at risk to his own life. His name has been inscribed in the walls at the Holocaust remembrance centre Yad Vashem in Jerusalem.

His grandson Justus von Dohnányi starred as Wilhelm Burgdorf in the 2004 film Downfall.

== See also ==
- List of members of the 20 July plot
- Widerstand
- Bonhoeffer Family
- Pius XII and the German Resistance
