= Christine von Dohnanyi =

Sister of Dietrich Bonhoeffer (1903–1965)

Christine von Dohnányi
- Dohnanyi in 1924
- Born: Christine Bonhoeffer; 26 October 1903; Königsberg
- Died: 2 February 1965 (aged 61); Kassel, Hesse, Germany
- Occupation: resistance activist
- Spouse: Hans von Dohnanyi
- Children: Christoph von Dohnányi; Klaus von Dohnanyi
- Father: Karl Bonhoeffer

Christine von Dohnanyi (née Bonhoeffer; 26 October 1903 – 2 February 1965) was the sister of Dietrich Bonhoeffer and the wife of Hans von Dohnanyi. She took part in their resistance activities against the Nazi Regime.

== Life ==
Her father was psychiatrist and neurologist Karl Bonhoeffer, noted for his criticism of Sigmund Freud; her mother Paula Bonhoeffer (née von Hase) was a teacher and the granddaughter of Protestant theologian Karl von Hase and painter Stanislaus von Kalckreuth. Bonhoeffer's family dynamic and his parents' values enabled her to receive a high level of education. Christine Bonhoeffer attended the Grunewald-Gymnasium. In September 1921, Bonhoeffer and Hans von Dohnanyi got engaged. In 1924 she abandoned her studies of zoology. In 1925 they married. Her daughter Barbara von Dohnanyi was born in 1926. Her first son Klaus von Dohnanyi was born in 1928, her second son Christoph von Dohnányi in 1929.

Christine von Dohnanyi took part in all resistance activities of her husband Hans von Dohnanyi and supported his activities. He had informed her about all activities and was in active exchange with her.

Beside her husband and her brother Dietrich Bonhoeffer, she was also arrested by the Gestapo in the house in Sacrow on 5 April 1943 on suspicion of treason. For a long time, Hans von Dohnanyi knew nothing about the arrest of his wife and brother-in-law and attempted unsuccessfully to send letters to Christine from prison. Christine von Dohnanyi, who was recovering from a serious stomach operation at the beginning of 1943, was originally taken to the Charlottenburger Kaiserdamm police prison and then imprisoned together with Josef Müller's wife in the Alexanderplatz police headquarters. However, she was released after a few weeks. After her release, she tried to obtain the release of her husband and brother. She smuggled diphtheria bacilli several times to enable him to escape interrogations, but also secret messages into her husband's prison. Any contact was made through the examining magistrate Manfred Roeder, who had a considerable influence on the possibilities of visiting and writing.

After Berlin's capitulation, the Allies granted her the status of a "victim of fascism" on 27 June 1945. She desperately tried to find out something more about the whereabouts of her husband and worked with the Allies for an appropriate appreciation of the resistance.

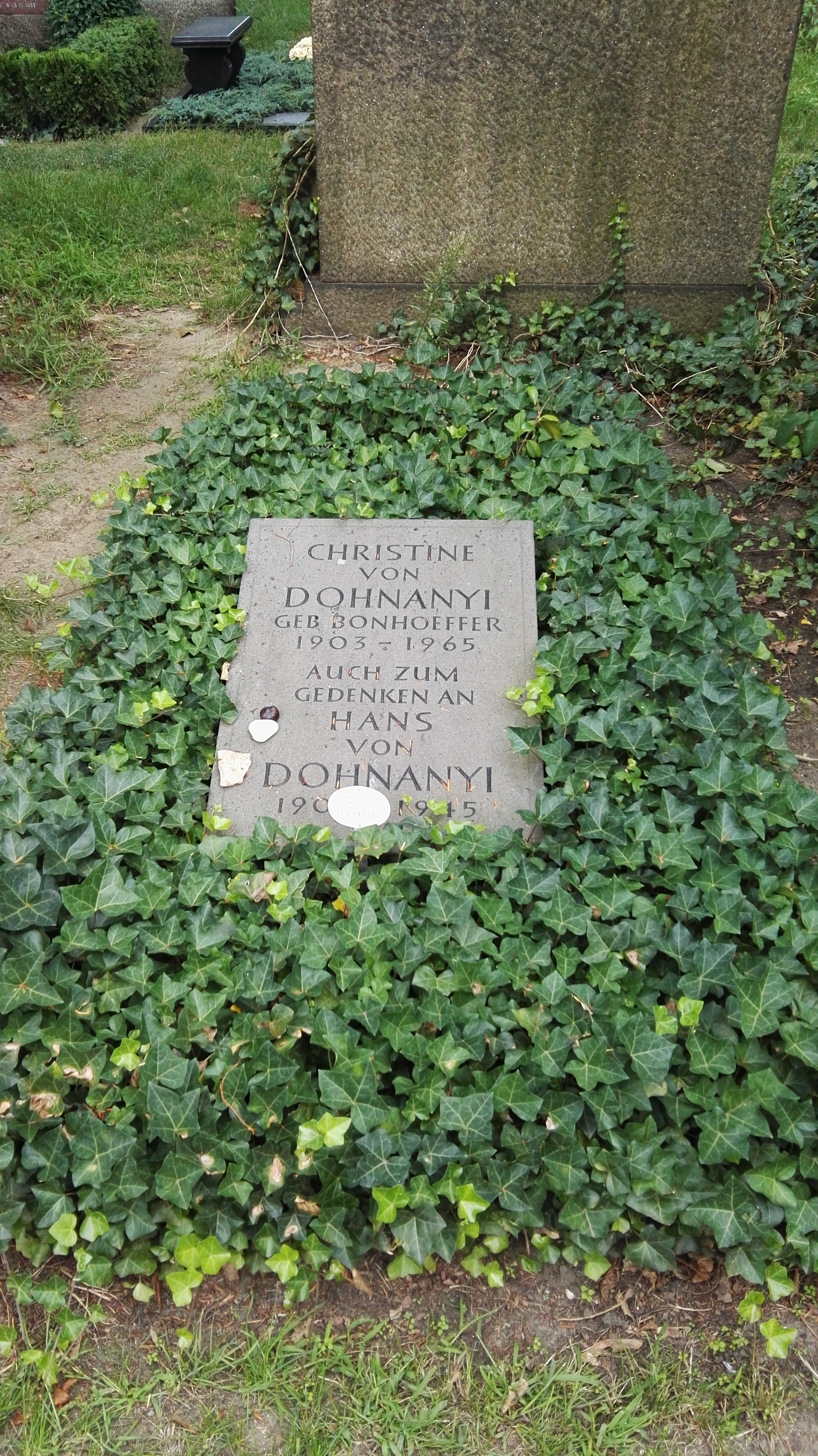
Grave on the Dorotheenstädtischer Friedhof

Her grave is on the Dorotheenstädtischer Friedhof. Son Klaus von Dohnanyi founded the foundation "Zivilcourage Hans und Christine von Dohnanyi".

== Quotes ==
"Tragt keinen Hass im Herzen gegen die Macht, die uns das angetan hat. Verbittert Eure jungen Seelen nicht, das rächt sich und nimmt Euch das Schönste, was es gibt, das Vertrauen." ("Have no hatred in your heart for the power that did this to us. Don't embitter your young souls, it will take revenge and take away the most beautiful thing there is, your trust.")

— Christine Dohnanyi on Easter Sunday, 26 April 1943, in a letter to her children from prison.
