= Peter Sauerbruch =

WW2 German Army officer (1913-2010)

- Born: 5 June 1913; Zurich, Switzerland
- Died: 29 September 2010 (aged 97); Munich, Germany
- Relatives: Ferdinand Sauerbruch (father)
- Military career
- Allegiance: Weimar Republic (to 1933); Nazi Germany
- Branch: Army
- Service years: 1932–45
- Rank: Oberstleutnant i.G.
- Commands: Kampfgruppe "Sauerbruch"
- Conflicts: World War II: Invasion of Poland; Battle of France; Operation Barbarossa; Battle of Smolensk (1941); Battle of Moscow; Second Battle of Kharkov; Battle of Stalingrad; Battle of Kursk; Prague Offensive
- Awards: Knight's Cross of the Iron Cross

Peter Sauerbruch (5 June 1913 – 29 September 2010) was a highly decorated Oberstleutnant i.G. in the Wehrmacht during World War II. He was also a recipient of the Knight's Cross of the Iron Cross.

== Awards and decorations ==
- Iron Cross (1939)
  - 2nd Class
  - 1st Class
- Panzer Badge
- Eastern Front Medal
- German Cross in Gold (30 December 1944)
- Knight's Cross of the Iron Cross on 4 January 1943 as Hauptmann im Generalstab and Ib (Quartermaster general) of the 14. Panzer-Division and leader of Kampfgruppe "Sauerbruch"
