= Klaus von Dohnanyi =

German politician (born 1928)

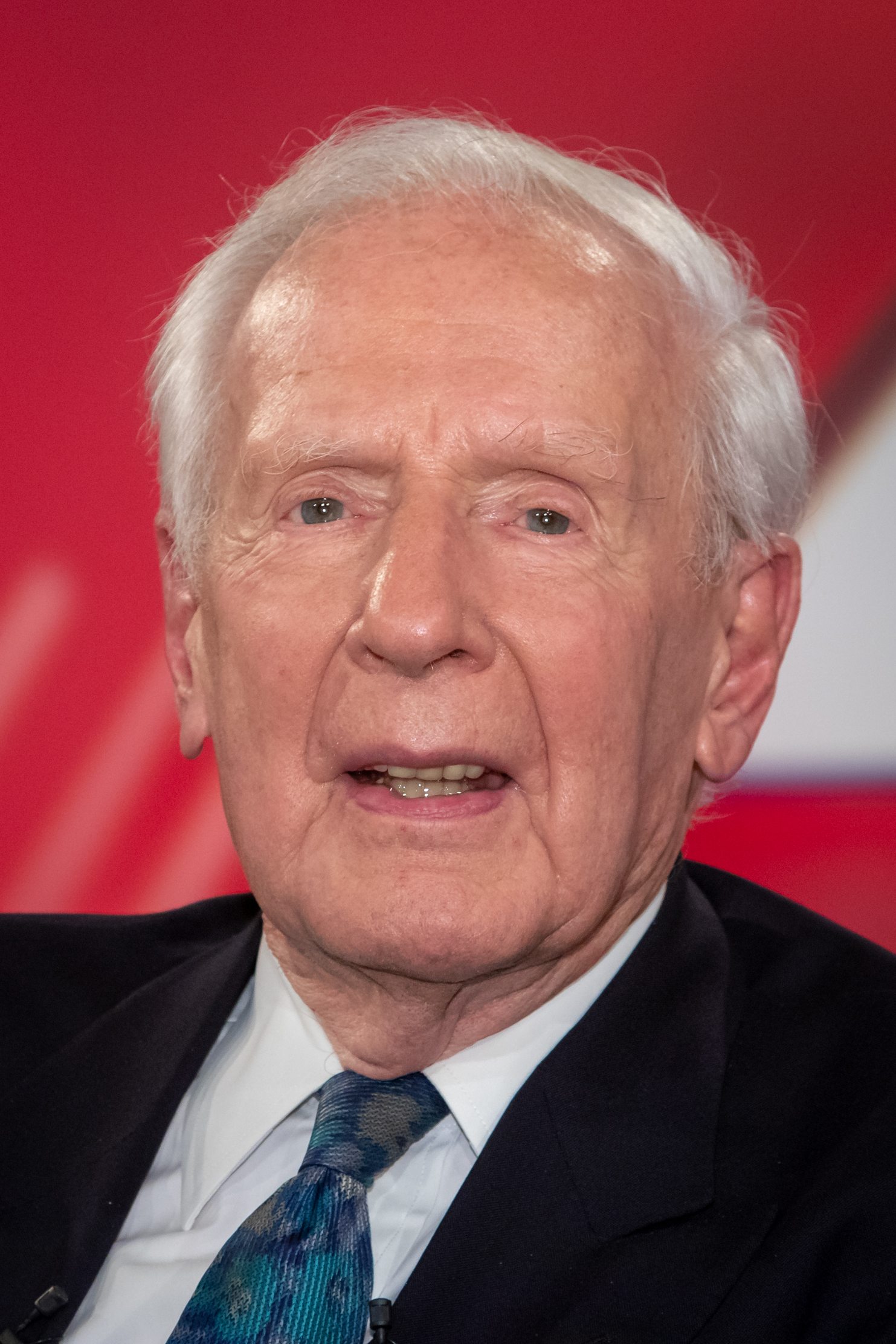
- von Dohnanyi in 2018

First Mayor of Hamburg
- In office 24 June 1981 – 8 June 1988
- President: Karl Carstens; Richard von Weizsäcker
- Chancellor: Helmut Schmidt; Helmut Kohl
- Preceded by: Hans-Ulrich Klose
- Succeeded by: Henning Voscherau

Personal details
- Born: 23 June 1928 (age 98) Hamburg, Germany
- Party: Social Democratic Party of Germany

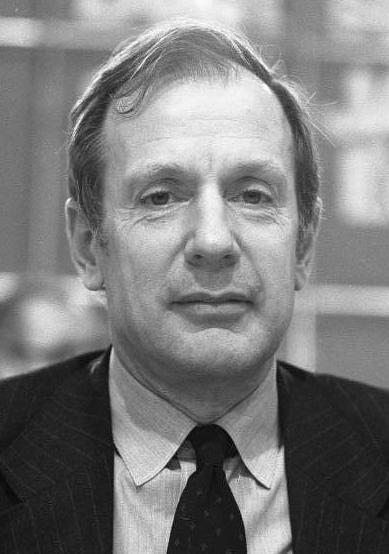
Dohnanyi in 1978

Klaus Karl Anton von Dohnanyi (German pronunciation: [ˈklaʊs fɔn doˈnaːni]; born 23 June 1928) is a German politician of the Social Democratic Party (SPD). He served as mayor of Hamburg between 1981 and 1988. As of 2026, he is the oldest living former head of a German state government.

== Early life and career ==
Dohnanyi was born in Hamburg, the son of Christine von Dohnanyi and Hans von Dohnanyi, a lawyer, and a nephew of the Lutheran theologian Dietrich Bonhoeffer. His grandfather was the celebrated Hungarian composer Ernst von Dohnányi. Both his father and uncle were executed in 1945 as members of the anti-Nazi German Resistance. His younger brother Christoph was a conductor. He also has a sister, Barbara.

After studying law at the Ludwig-Maximilians-Universität München, and later in the United States at Columbia University, Stanford University, and Yale University, Dohnanyi started his career with the Max Planck Institute for International Private Law. He then moved to Ford Motor Company, the car manufacturer, working for the company in both Detroit and Cologne where he was head of the Planning Division. From 1960 to 1967, he was a Managing Partner of the Institute for Market Research and Management Consulting in Munich.

== Political career ==
In 1969, Dohnanyi was elected to the German Federal Parliament (the Bundestag) from the state of Rhineland-Palatinate and served in the Economics ministry as state secretary, and later as Federal Minister of Education and Science from 15 March 1972 to 16 May 1974, in government of chancellor Willy Brandt. In 1981, Dohnanyi was elected First Mayor of his home city, and thus Minister-President of Hamburg, one of the federal States of Germany. He served two terms as First Mayor, from 24 June 1981 until 8 June 1988.

After the fall of the Berlin Wall and with German unification, Dohnanyi became involved with the restructuring programme in East Germany, and from 1993 to 1996 was a special adviser on Market Economy and State to the Board of the Treuhandanstalt and BvS, its successor company, responsible for privatising state-owned companies in the former East Germany. Dohnanyi is a member of the Konvent für Deutschland, a cross-party think-tank of conservative-liberal orientation.

In 2004, Dohnanyi co-chaired (alongside Edgar Most) a government-appointed commission which presented Minister Manfred Stolpe, then serving as cabinet minister charged with eastern reconstruction, with a 29-page report ("Recommendations for a Change in Direction for Development East").

== Other activities (selection) ==
- AIESEC Germany, Member of the Board of Trustees
- Berlin-Brandenburg Academy of Sciences and Humanities, Member of the Senate
- Bertelsmann Stiftung, Member of the Advisory Board (1989–1998)
- Friedrich Ebert Foundation (FES), Member of the Board of Trustees
- Hamburger Theaterfestival, Member of the Board of Trustees
