= Sauerbruch chamber =

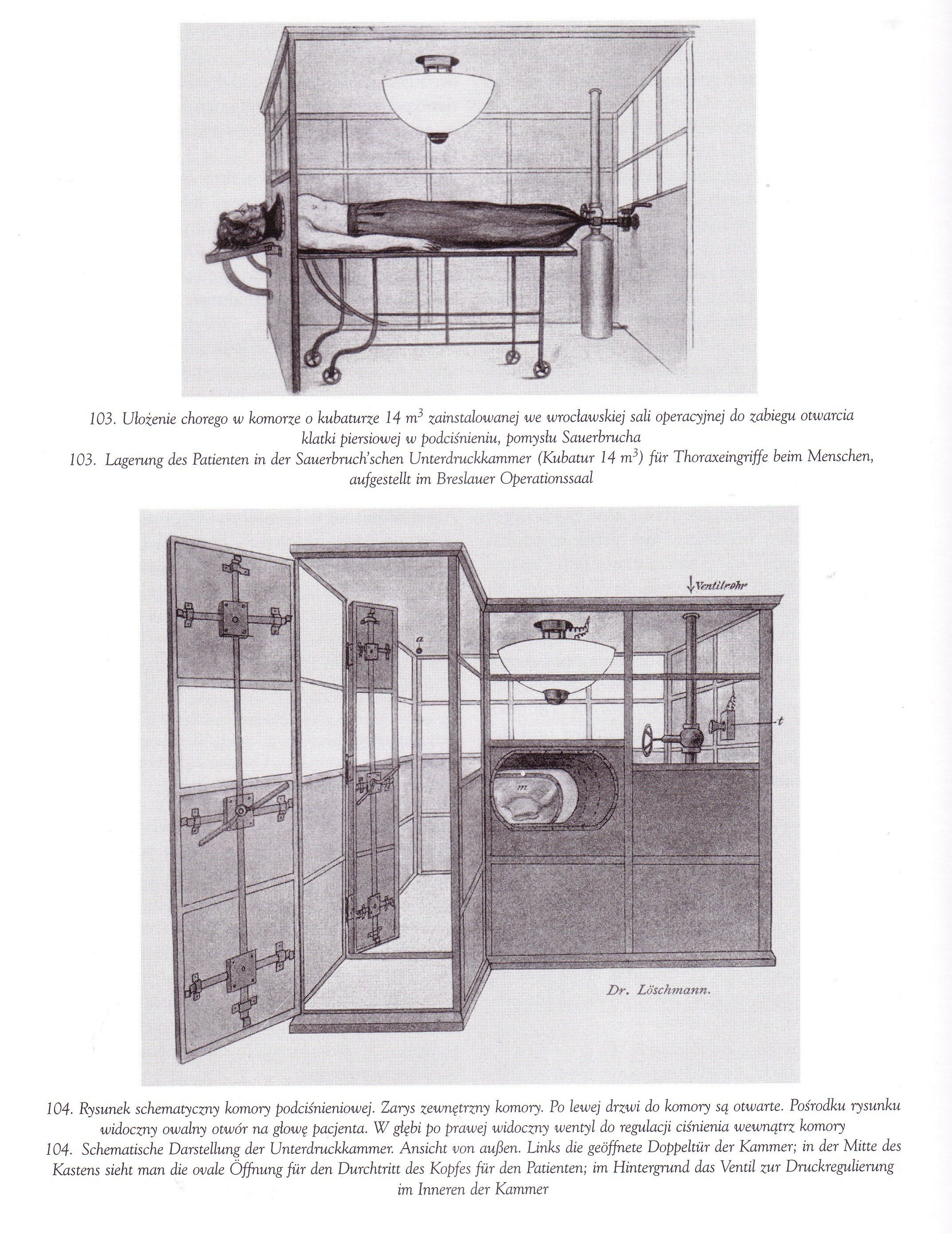
First operating chamber used by Mikulicz and Sauerbruch

A Sauerbruch chamber, is a hermetically sealed chamber where surgical operations of the thorax are carried out, preventing complication by elevating or reducing air pressure. It was developed by the German surgeon Ferdinand Sauerbruch and first used in 1904.

In the Sauerbruch chamber the patient's head is elided, sticking out of the glass-chamber. The surgical team works inside the chamber that hermetically seals the body of the patient. To start the operation on the thorax a vacuum of 1/10 Bar is generated in the chamber, preventing the patient's lungs from collapsing upon opening the thorax.

== History ==
Until the beginning of the twentieth century thoracic surgery did not seem possible because a reduced-pressure-atmosphere prevails in the body cavity, hence the lungs collapse when the body cavity is opened resulting in pneumothorax, causing death. Surgeon Ferdinand Sauerbruch realized this problem, concluding that altered external pressure might render thoracic surgery possible. He issued the construction of a glass-chamber for experiments.

=== First experiments on animals ===
After a series of tests on rabbits and dogs, Sauerbruch proudly presented his apparatus to Jan Mikulicz-Radecki, the head of his clinic at the University of Breslau – but the presentation failed because of material error. Mikulicz-Radecki grew disappointed and discharged Sauerbruch from his hospital. But after continuing his research in a private hospital, Sauerbruch contacted Mikulicz-Radecki again and gained his approval for human trials.

=== Operation on humans ===
On 6 April 1904 Sauerbruch and Prof. Mikulicz presented an operation on the open thorax in a vacuum chamber, growing famous after succeeding, although the first patient, an old woman soon died. Nevertheless the second operation, performed on an opera singer, proved Sauerbruch's methods viable.

The chamber was soon called "Sauerbruch chamber". Sauerbruch went to Greifswald and Marburg after the death of Professor Mikulicz and used this opportunities to further develop his method. As head of clinics in Zürich and later Munich, he built his final vacuum chamber after the First World War.

== Replacement ==
Since the introduction of tracheal intubation, the effect of the Saucherbruch chamber is achieved by positive pressure ventilation. In the treatment of esophagus cancer, tumors of the mediastinum, or lung tumors, an overpressure in the ventilation of the operated is generated, a process which is more practical and more successful.

== See also ==
- Cardiac surgery
