= Karl Bonhoeffer =

German psychiatrist (1868–1948)

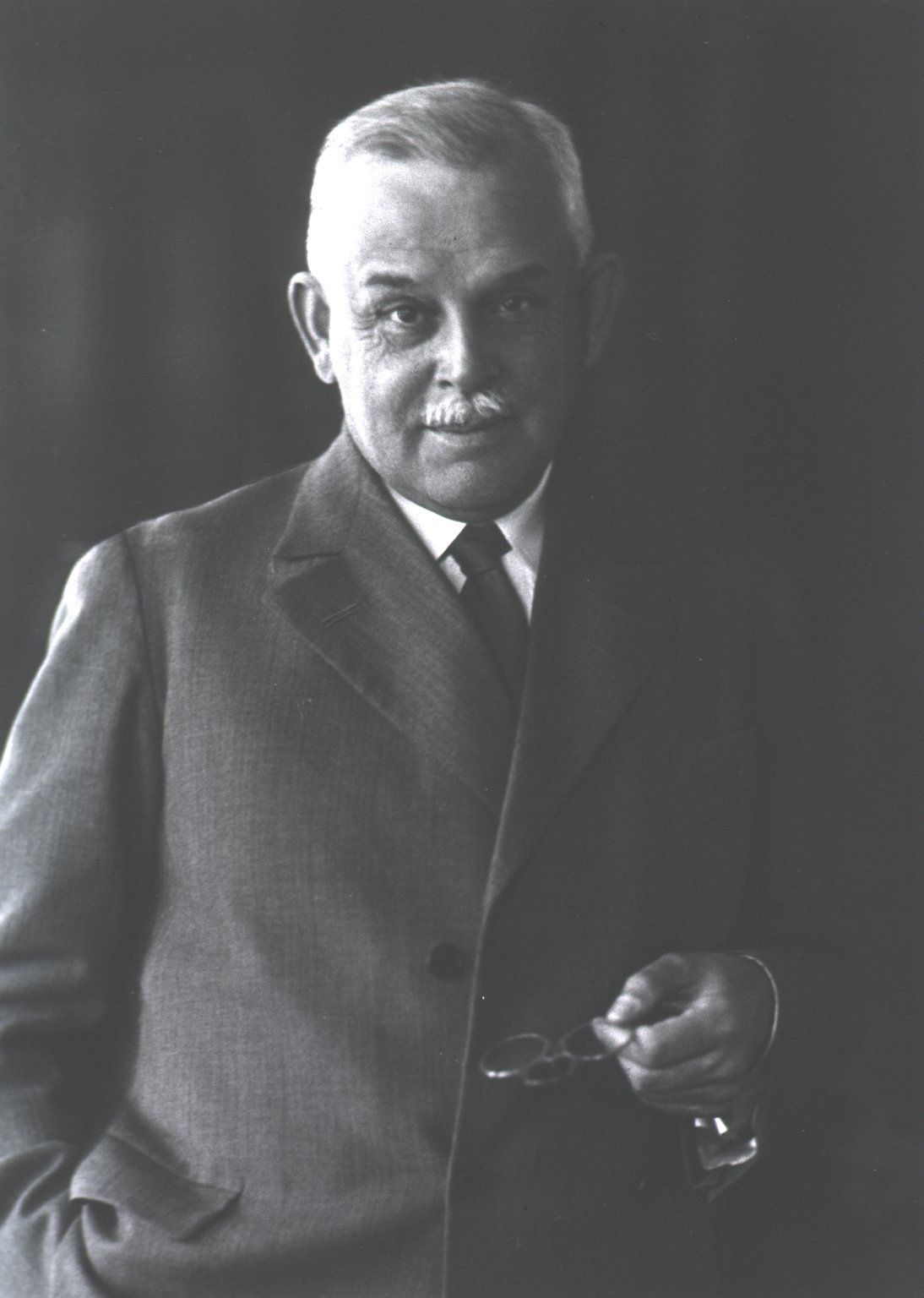
Karl Bonhoeffer, before 1938

Karl Bonhoeffer (German: [ˈkaʁl ˈbɔnhøːfɐ]; 31 March 1868 – 4 December 1948) was a German neurologist, psychiatrist and physician.

== Life ==
Bonhoeffer was born in Neresheim in the Kingdom of Württemberg to Friedrich von Bonhoeffer (1828–1907), who worked as judge in Ulm, and Julie Tafel (1842–1936). His brother was chemist Gustav-Otto Bonhoeffer. From 1887 to 1892, Bonhoeffer studied medicine at the University of Tübingen, the Friedrich Wilhelm University of Berlin and the Ludwig-Maximilians-Universität München. From 1904 to 1912, Bonhoeffer worked as a professor at the University of Breslau. From 1912 to 1938, Bonhoeffer worked at the Charité in Berlin. In 1898, he married Paula von Hase (1876–1951). Two of his children were Klaus Bonhoeffer and Dietrich Bonhoeffer, both of whom were executed by the Nazis. One of his daughters was Christine von Dohnanyi and one more son was chemist Karl-Friedrich Bonhoeffer. Bonhoeffer died in Berlin at the age of 80 after the end of World War II.

Bonhoeffer became involved in the resistance against the Nazi regime following the launch of the Aktion T4 programme in 1939. He forged the documentation of disabled patients, suggesting sources to other doctors to save patients.

Along with Emil Kraepelin, Bonhoeffer was a major opponent of sexual reform movement that advocated for gay rights in the Weimar Republic. His medical education served to legitimize Kraepelin's calls for "educational discipline" against gay people, including severe punishments for 'corruption.' These policies extended beyond the bounds of homosexual intercourse, instead applying to any act that involved sexual gratification. These arguments were later taken up by the Nazi party, providing the grounds to treat homosexuality as an epidemic deserving of severe punishment, in doing so providing the Nazis with the rhetoric needed to persecute gay men under the guise of conforming to scientific knowledge.

He died from stroke on 4 December 1948 in Berlin, Germany.

== Works ==
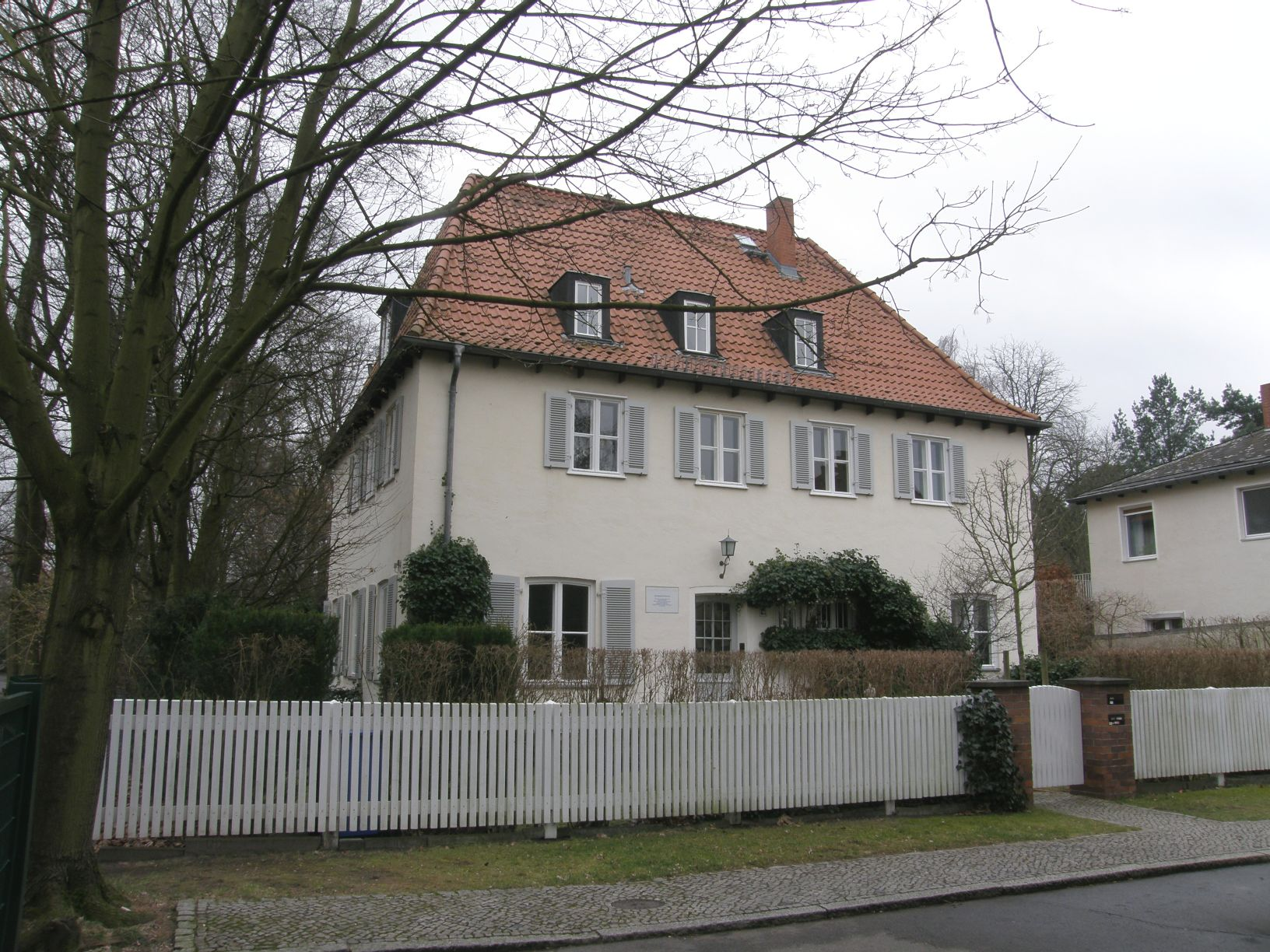
Karl Bonhoeffer family home in Berlin-Westend

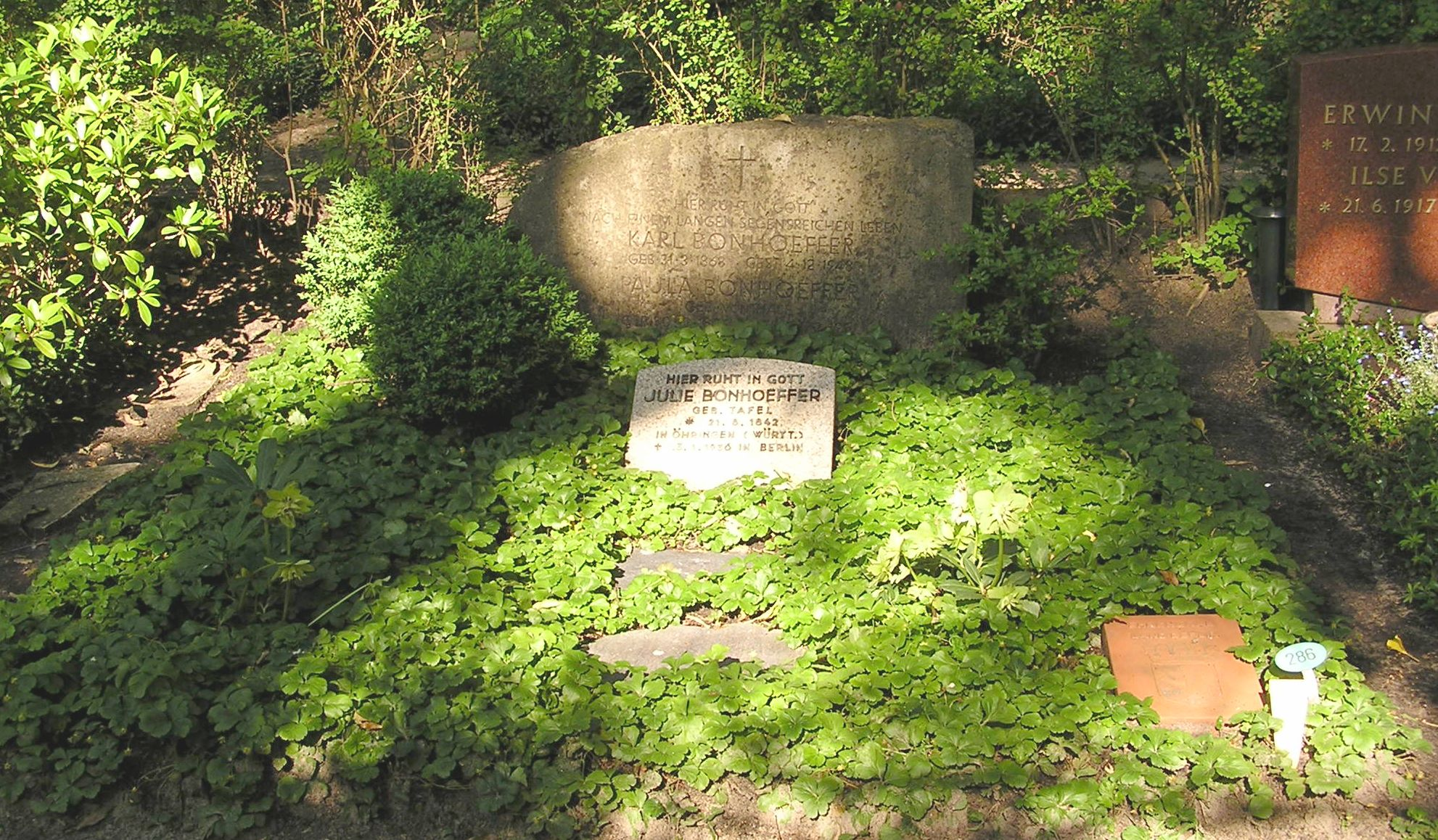
Grave of Karl Bonhoeffer and wife Paula von Hase in Waldfriedhof Heerstraße, Ehrengrab of the State of Berlin

- "Ein Beitrag zur Kenntnis des großstädtischen Bettel- und Vagabundentums. Eine psychiatrische Untersuchung." Zeitschrift für die gesamte Strafrechtswissenschaft, vol. 21, 1–65. Berlin 1900.
- Die akuten Geisteskrankheiten der Gewohnheitstrinker. Jena 1901.
- Die symptomatischen Psychosen im Gefolge von akuten Infektionen und inneren Erkrankungen. Deuticke, Leipzig, Wien 1910.
- "Die Psychosen im Gefolge von akuten Infektionen, Allgemeinerkrankungen und inneren Erkrankerungen." In: Handbuch der Psychiatrie. Spezieller Teil. 3:1. Deuticke, Leipzig, Wien 1912, p. 1–120.
- "Die exogenen Reaktionstypen." Archiv für Psychiatrie und Nervenkrankheiten vol. 58, Berlin 1917, pp. 50–70.
- with P. Jossmann (ed.): Ergebnisse der Reiztherapie bei progressiver Paralyse. 1932.
- with K. Albrecht et al. (ed.): Die psychiatrischen Aufgaben bei der Ausführung des Gesetzes zur Verhütung erbkranken Nachwuchses. Mit einem Anhang Die Technik der Unfruchtbarmachung. Klinische Vorträge im erbbiologischen Kurs. Karger, Berlin 1934.
- (ed.): Die Erbkrankheiten. Klinische Vorträge im 2. erbbiologischen Kurs. 1936.
- "Die zentralen Bewegungsstörungen. Die akuten und chronischen choreatischen Erkrankungen und die Myoklonien." In: S. A. Kinnier-Wilson: Die zentralen Bewegungsstörungen. 1936.
