= Symphony No. 1 (Dohnányi) =

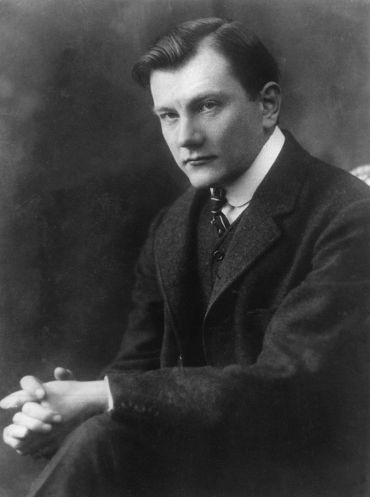
Ernő Dohnányi, c. 1900

The Symphony No. 1 in D minor, Op. 9, was completed by Ernő Dohnányi in 1901, when the composer was 24. It was his second venture into orchestral writing, his Symphony in F written in 1896 was not published. The symphony in D minor was premiered in January 1902 in Manchester, England, under the baton of Hans Richter. The Hungarian premiere followed in 1903.

Although audibly influenced by the prevailing voices of the time, including Bruckner, Strauss, Tchaikovsky, Wagner, Mahler and Brahms, the work nonetheless demonstrates a formidable handling of complex compositional techniques and is a notable precursor to what would become Dohnányi's distinctive neoromantic style.

As with most of his public work, Dohnányi published the composition under the Germanized version of his name, Ernst von Dohnányi. The symphony is 50–55 minutes in duration.

== Structure ==
The work is structured, uncommonly for Dohnányi's time, in five movements. It opens with the customary fast movement; the next three are in a slow-fast-slow configuration, with two calmer movements on either side of a vigorous scherzo. The finale is the work's longest section, and ends in a triumphant conclusion.

The score is marked as follows:

1. Allegro ma non troppo
2. Molto adagio
3. Scherzo – Presto
4. Intermezzo – Andante con moto
5. Finale – Introduzione, Tema con variazione e Fuga

== Orchestration ==
The symphony is written for an orchestra typical of the late-Romantic era:

- Woodwinds: piccolo, three flutes, two oboes, English horn, two clarinets, bass clarinet, three bassoons, contrabassoon
- Brass: six horns, three trumpets, three trombones, tuba
- Percussion: timpani, cymbals, snare drum, triangle, tambourine, glockenspiel, xylophone
- Strings: 16 1st violins, 10–16 2nd violins, 8–12 violas, 10 cellos, 4 double basses, 2 harps

== Recordings ==
There have been three major recordings of this symphony, two in 1998. Matthias Bamert, who had two years earlier conducted the premiere recording of Dohnányi's Symphony No. 2, directed a performance with the BBC Philharmonic with Chandos Records label; Leon Botstein conducted the London Philharmonic with Telarc label. The information of the recordings is as follows:

- 1998: Matthias Bamert (with the BBC Philharmonic Orchestra), recorded 1998, released 1998 on Dohnanyi: Symphony No. 1, American Rhapsody (Chandos Records Ltd.) as "Dohnányi: Symphony No. 1" (55:24).
- 1998: Leon Botstein (with the London Philharmonic Orchestra), recorded 1998, released 1998 on Ernst von Dohnányi: Symphony No. 1 (Telarc International Corporation) as "Ernst von Dohnányi: Symphony No. 1" (53:39).
- 2019: Roberto Paternostro (with the Deutsche Staatsphilharmonie Rheinland-Pfalz), recorded 2019, released 2019 on Ernst von Dohnanyi: Symphony No. 1, Symphonic Minutes (Capriccio) (54:43)

In addition to these, numerous informal and unprofessional recordings have been made and are typically not available for purchase.
