= Serenade in D major =

Serenade in D major may refer to:

- Serenade in D major, P. 87 (Michael Haydn)
- Serenade No. 4 (Mozart)
- Serenade No. 5 (Mozart)
- Serenade No. 6 (Mozart), "Serenata Notturna"
- Serenade No. 7 (Mozart), "Haffner Serenade"
- Serenade No. 9 (Mozart), "Posthorn Serenade"
- Serenade in D major, converted into Symphony No. 35 (Mozart), "Haffner Symphony"
- Serenade for Violin, Viola and Cello (Beethoven)
- Serenade for flute, violin and viola (Beethoven)
- Serenade No. 1 (Brahms)
- No. 1 of the Two Serenades, Op. 69 (Sibelius)
