= Serenade for String Trio =

Serenade for String Trio or Serenade for Violin, Viola and Cello may refer to:

- Serenade for Violin, Viola and Cello (Beethoven)
- Serenade (Dohnányi)
