= Alfred Wallenstein =

American conductor (1898–1983)

Alfred Wallenstein (October 7, 1898 – February 8, 1983) was an American cellist and conductor. A successful solo and orchestral cellist in his early life, Wallenstein took up conducting in the 1930s and served as music director of the Los Angeles Philharmonic from 1943 to 1956.

== Early life ==
Wallenstein was born on October 7, 1898, in Chicago. His family was of Austrian descent, having immigrated to the United States in the 1880s.

As a boy, Wallenstein took piano lessons from his parents, who were amateur musicians. After his family moved to Los Angeles in 1905, Wallenstein was made to choose between a gift of a bicycle or a cello, opting for the cello. He made rapid progress on the instrument, first gaining notability playing in restaurants.

== Playing career ==
By his early teenage years, he had found work in Clune's Theater on Broadway, where he caught the attention of the impresario Lynden Behymer. Owing to Behymer's connections, Wallenstein was given performance opportunities in high-profile clubs, as well as pit orchestras for silent films, where he became a personal favorite of prominent actors including Mary Pickford and Douglas Fairbanks. By age fifteen, he had found popularity on vaudeville, touring as "The Wonder Boy Cellist."

At the age of 17, he joined the cello section of the San Francisco Symphony. He subsequently toured South America with Russian ballerina Anna Pavlova, whom Wallenstein had impressed after accompanying her on a performance of "The Swan" by Camille Saint-Saëns. Upon returning from the tour in 1919, Wallenstein joined the Los Angeles Philharmonic. He saved his money and traveled to Leipzig. While there, Wallenstein studied with the German cellist Julius Klengel and briefly attempted to earn a degree in medicine at his father's urging.

Wallenstein returned to the United States after two years in Germany, and through Klengel's influence, he was appointed principal cello of the Chicago Symphony Orchestra under Frederick Stock. His playing greatly impressed Stock, who would later dedicate his Cello Concerto to Wallenstein. In 1927, Wallenstein saw Arturo Toscanini conduct for the first time, becoming enamored of his musicality. He auditioned for Toscanini's New York Philharmonic, to which he was appointed principal cellist in 1929.

== Conducting career ==
Toscanini, also a cellist, urged Wallenstein to become a conductor. In 1931, Wallenstein was hired by New York radio station WOR, serving as a staff conductor for live orchestra broadcasts, and the following year appeared as a conductor and soloist at the Hollywood Bowl. His work impressed the station's owners, the Mutual Broadcasting System, who created a new radio concert series featuring Wallenstein's eponymous studio orchestra, the Wallenstein Sinfonietta. He was named music director of WOR in 1935, and served in that capacity until 1945. During those years, his broadcast programs were highly successful, reaching millions. The programs included cycles of all of Johann Sebastian Bach's cantatas, Wolfgang Amadeus Mozart's piano concertos, and infrequently-performed symphonies by Mozart and Joseph Haydn. Wallenstein also programmed works by contemporary American composers. For his work on these broadcasts, he was awarded a Peabody Award for Outstanding Entertainment in Music in 1941.

After moving back to Los Angeles in 1943, he succeeded the ailing Otto Klemperer as music director of the Los Angeles Philharmonic. During his tenure, Wallenstein championed the works of American composers, including Aaron Copland, Morton Gould, and Samuel Barber. In total, forty-seven American composers received performances from Wallenstein during his directorship. Wallenstein was known to advocate for the musicians of the philharmonic, successfully arguing for higher salaries and expanding the orchestra's repertoire. He refused to fire musicians suspected as communist sympathizers during the Second Red Scare. He also hired double-bassist Henry Lewis, marking the first time a black musician was hired by a major orchestra.

Wallenstein left the Los Angeles Philharmonic in 1956. He made frequent guest conducting appearances around the United States and Europe. These included concerts with the New York Philharmonic, Philadelphia Orchestra, Symphony of the Air, and a stint as director of the Caramoor Summer Music Festival from 1958 to 1961.

In his later life, Wallenstein turned to educational affairs. From 1962 to 1964, he oversaw an educational program for young American conductors at the Peabody Institute. He became a member of the Juilliard School faculty in 1968, and was appointed director of orchestras in 1971.

Wallenstein's final conducting appearance was with the Juilliard Symphony Orchestra in 1979. He died in Manhattan on February 8, 1983, at the age of 84.

== Personal life ==
Wallenstein married his wife, Virginia (née Wilson), in 1924. She died in 1973, after which Wallenstein moved permanently to New York. They had no children.

== Recordings ==
Wallenstein made a number of LP recordings during his career. He recorded solo cello repertoire for Victor in the 1920s, and was accompanied in several recordings by his wife, Virginia, herself a pianist. He was the featured cellist on a 1932 recording of Don Quixote by Richard Strauss, with Thomas Beecham conducting the New York Philharmonic. As a conductor, Wallenstein made several recordings with the Los Angeles Philharmonic for Decca Records, including selections from the musical Oklahoma! and suites from George Gershwin's opera Porgy and Bess. Wallenstein's other recordings with the philharmonic include the Suite in F-sharp minor by Ernst von Dohnányi, Sergei Rachmaninoff's Piano Concerto No. 2 featuring pianist Eugene List, Beethoven's Piano Concerto No. 4 with pianist Arthur Rubinstein, an album of waltzes by Pyotr Ilyich Tchaikovsky, and Rachmaninoff's Symphony No. 2 for Capitol Records in their FDS series.

For Audio Fidelity Records in September and October 1958, he conducted the specially-formed Virtuoso Symphony of London in Walthamstow Town Hall.

In April 1964 he conducted the London Symphony Orchestra for a recording of Tchaikovsky's Violin Concerto with the young Itzhak Perlman at the Kingsway Hall in London.
