= Vazsonyi =

Vazsonyi or Vázsonyi is a Hungarian surname. It may refer to:

- Andrew Vázsonyi (1916–2003), mathematician and operations researcher
- Balint Vazsonyi (1936–2003), pianist and journalist
- Vilmos Vázsonyi (1868–1926), publicist and politician
