= String trio =

Music written for three string players

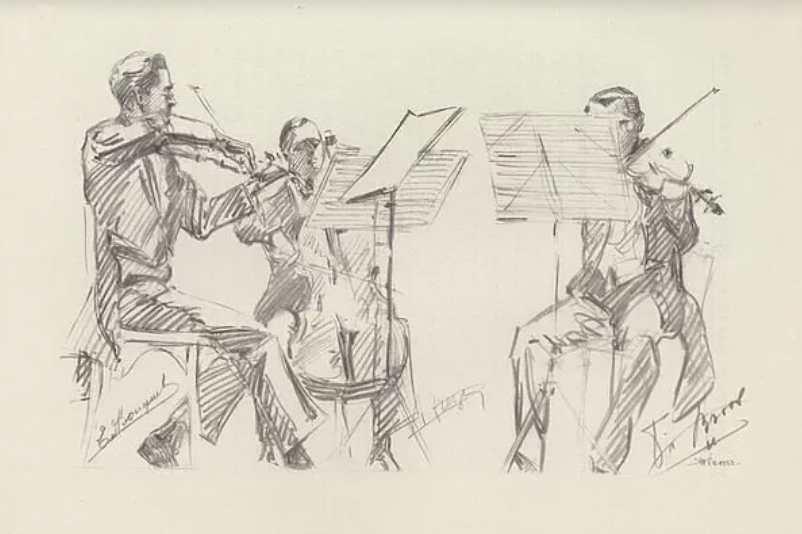
The Brussels String Trio (Edmond Bouquet, Adolphe Frezin, Francois Broos) Pencil Portraits of Concert Celebrities by Hilda Wiener

A string trio is a group of three string instruments or a piece written for such a group. From at least the 19th century on, the term "string trio" with otherwise unspecified instrumentation normally refers to the combination violin, viola and cello. The classical string trio emerged during the mid-18th century and later expanded into four subgenres: the grand trio, the concertant trio, the brilliant trio, and the Hausmusik trio.

== Early history ==
The earliest string trio, found during the mid 18th century, consisted of two violins and a cello, a grouping which had grown out of the Baroque trio sonata. Over the course of the late 18th century, the string trio scored for violin, viola, and cello came to be the predominant type. String trios scored for two violins and viola were also used, although much less frequently. The term "string trio" was not used until the late 19th century. The genre was previously referred to as divertimento a tre, sonate a tre, and terzetto. French composers sometimes used Trietti or Conversazioni a tré to name their trios. The early classical string trio generally consisted of three movements, although four, five and six movement trios were later written. Most movements were in binary form, although some of Joseph Haydn's trios were written as theme and variations. The violins shared the important thematic material, while the cello maintained an accompanimental role.

== Later history ==
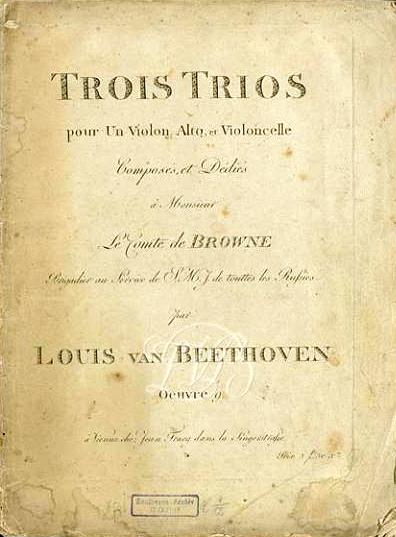
Title page of the first edition of Beethoven's String Trios, Op. 9, Vienna 1799

During the mid to late 18th century, a couple of developments occurred in the genre. The changes included the absence of a figured bass, the equal treatment of all voices (as opposed to the top voice dominating the musical texture), and the use of sonata form in the first movement. These early developments paved the way for the genre to further expand into four specific types: the grand trio, the concertant trio, the brilliant trio, and the Hausmusik trio.

=== Grand trio ===
The grand trio was a product of South Germany and Austria. It was modeled after the mid to late 18th century serenade and nocturne. One of the best-known examples that legitimized the grand trio is Mozart’s Divertimento in E♭, K. 563. Inspired by the piece, Beethoven set out to write String Trio in E♭, Op. 3.

=== Concertant trio ===
The concertant trio was created in France, consists of two movements, and all three voices are used equally in the texture. The first movement is usually in binary or sonata form. Giuseppe Cambini was the leading composer of the genre. Some of his works include 3 trios concertants pour violon alto et violoncelle, Op. 2 and 6 trios concertants pour Deux Violons et Basse, Op. 18.

=== Brilliant trio ===
The brilliant trio became the most popular string trio in France in the 19th century due to its virtuosic passages featured in the first violin part. The trio consists of three movements, organized in a fast-slow-fast pattern, and the first movement is written in sonata form. The first composer to use "brilliant" in the genre was Rudolph Kreutzer in his pieces 3 Trios brillants, Op. 15 and Op. 16.

=== Hausmusik trio ===
The Hausmusik trio was intended for amateurs and student musicians. It was regarded as a pedagogical tool intended as preparation for the grand trio, the brilliant trio, and the string quartet. Some examples of the Hausmusik trio include 6 Trios progressives, Op. 28 by Franz Anton Hoffmeister and 3 Trios faciles et progressives, Op. 43 by Franz Alexander Pössinger.

== List of string trios ==
=== Violin, viola, cello ===
Composer	Composition
Johann Georg Albrechtsberger (1736–1809)	Sonata I in C major; Sonata II in E♭ major; Terzetto in C major, Op. 9a, No. 1; Terzetto in A major, Op. 9a, No. 2; Terzetto in F major, Op. 9a, No. 3; Terzetto in D major, Op. 9a, No. 4; Terzetto in B♭ major, Op. 9a, No. 5; Terzetto in E♭ major, Op. 9a, No. 6
Georges Aperghis (born 1945)	Faux mouvement (1995)
J.S. Bach (1685–1750)	Goldberg Variations, BWV 988 (1741) (Arr. by Dmitry Sitkovetsky, in memoriam Glenn Gould)
Ludwig van Beethoven (1770–1827)	String Trio No. 1 in E♭ major, Op. 3 (1794); Serenade "String Trio No. 2" in D major, Op. 8 (1796-97); String Trio No. 3 in G major, Op. 9, No. 1 (1797-98); String Trio No. 4 in D major, Op. 9, No. 2 (1797-98); String Trio No. 5 in C minor, Op. 9, No. 3 (1797-98)
Wilhelm Berger (1861–1911)	String Trio in G minor, Op. 69
Lennox Berkeley (1903–1989)	Trio for strings, Op. 19 (1944)
Howard Blake (born 1938)	String Trio, Op. 199
Luigi Boccherini (1743–1805)	String Trios, G 95–100 and G 107–112
Carlos Chávez (1899–1978)	Invención II (1965)
Friedrich Cerha (1926–2023)	9 Bagatellen (2008) Zebra Trio (2010)
Justin Connolly (1933–2020)	String Trio, Op. 43 (2009–10)
Arnold Atkinson Cooke (1906–2005)	String Trio D51 (1950)
Jean Cras (1879–1932)	Trio pour violon, alto et violoncelle (1926)
Johann Nepomuk David (1895–1977)	Trio G-Dur (DK 267), Trio Werk 33/1, Nicoló Amati gewidmet, Trio Werk 33/2, Antonio Stradivari gewidmet, Trio Werk 33/3, Guarneri del Gesú gewidmet, Trio Werk 33/4, Jacobus Stainer gewidmet
Matthew Davidson (born 1964)	Music for String Trio (2006) (Davidson n.d.)
Carl Ditters von Dittersdorf (1739–1799)	Divertimento in D major; Sonatas a tre, Op. 1, Nos. 1–6, k. 200–205; Sonatas, Op. 2, Nos. 1–6, k. 212_17
Ernő Dohnányi (1877–1960)	Serenade in C major, Op. 10
Gottfried von Einem (1918–1996)	String Trio, Op. 74; String Trio (fragment without opus)
Anders Eliasson (1947–2013)	Trio per archi "Ahnungen" (2013)
George Enescu (1881–1955)	Aubade, for violin, viola, and cello (Allegretto grazioso)
Karlheinz Essl (born 1960)	à trois/seul (1998)
Joseph Leopold Eybler (1765–1846)	String Trio Op. 2 in C major HV 197; String Trio in E♭ major (fragment) HV 248
Magdeleine Boucherit le Faure (1879–1960)	Impressions. Suite for Violin, Viola and Cello. Paris: Éditions Salabert, 1933.
Brian Ferneyhough (born 1943)	String Trio (1995)
Gerald Finzi (1901-1956)	Prelude and Fugue for String Trio (1938)
Jean Françaix (1912–1997)	String Trio in C major, Op. 2
Jürg Frey (1953-)	Streichtrio (1997); String Trio (2017/2018/2022)
Robert Fuchs (1847–1927)	String Trio in A major, Op. 94
Joseph Gehot (1756–1820)	String Trios, Op. 2, Nos. 1–6
Yefim Golyshev (1897–1970)	String Trio, Zwölftondauer-Komplexe (twelve-tone-duration complex) (1925)
Jorge Grundman (born 1961)	String Trio No. 1 in A♭ major; String Trio No. 2 in G major; String Trio No. 3 in C major
Sofia Gubaidulina (born 1931)	String Trio
John Harbison (born 1938)	String Trio (2013)
Joseph Haydn (1732–1809)	String Trio in B major, Hob. V:8 (1765)
Swan Hennessy (1866–1929)	Petit trio celtique, Op. 52 (1921)
Heinrich von Herzogenberg (1843–1900)	String Trios, Op. 27, Nos. 1 & 2
Paul Hindemith (1895–1963)	String Trio No. 1, Op. 34; String Trio No. 2; Des kleinen Elektromusikers Lieblinge
Gilad Hochman (born 1982)	Brief Memories for String Trio (2004) (Hochman n.d.).
Franz Anton Hoffmeister (1754–1812)	Terzetto Scholastico Streichtrio
Vagn Holmboe (1909–1996)	Gioco (Game) for string trio (1983)
Johann Nepomuk Hummel (1778–1837)	String Trio no. 1 in E♭ major; String Trio no. 2 in G major
André Jolivet (1905–1974)	Suite for String trio
Gideon Klein (1919–1945)	String Trio (1944)
Zoltán Kodály (1882–1967)	Intermezzo-Allegretto
Hans Krása (1899–1944)	TANEC, for string trio; Passacaglia and Fugue, for string trio
Ernst Krenek (1900–1991)	String Trio, Op. 118; String Trio Parvula Corona Musicalis: ad honorem Johannis Sebastiani Bach, Op. 122; String Trio in 12 Stations, Op. 235
Carmelo Mantione (born 1980)	Trio d'archi (2021)
Frank Martin (1890–1974)	Trio (1936)
Donald Martino (1931–2005)	String Trio (1954)
Bohuslav Martinů (1890–1959)	String Trio No. 1, H. 136 (1923); String Trio No. 2, H. 238 (1934)
Grace-Evangeline Mason (born 1994)	Into the Abyss, I Throw Roses (2018)
Siegfried Matthus (born 1934)	Windspiele, for string trio
Erkki Melartin (1875–1937)	String Trio Op.133 (1926?)
Darius Milhaud (1892–1974)	Sonatine à trois, Op. 221b (1940); String Trio, Op. 274 (1947)
Wolfgang Amadeus Mozart (1756–1791)	Divertimento, in E♭ major, K. 563 (1788); Preludes and Fugues, K. 404a (1782)
Ernst Naumann (1832–1910)	Trio in D major, Op. 12
Ștefan Niculescu (1927–2008)	String Trio (1957, rev. 1977); Per Tre (1985)
Andrew Norman (born 1979)	The Companion Guide to Rome (2010)
Krzysztof Penderecki (born 1933)	String Trio (1990–91)
Václav Pichl (1741–1805)	String Trios, Op. 4, Nos. 1–6; Trios concertans, Op. 7, Nos. 1–6
Wayne Peterson (1927–2021)	String Trio (2007)
Ignaz Pleyel (1757–1831)	3 String Trios, B 401–403
Gerhard Präsent (born 1957)	Sounds Of Wood (1998)
Max Reger (1873–1916)	String Trio no. 1 in A minor, Op. 77b; String Trio No. 2 in D minor, Op. 141b
Carl Reinecke (1824–1910)	String Trio in C minor, Op. 249
Wolfgang Rihm (born 1952)	Musik für drei Streicher (1977)
Sofie Rohnstock (1875-1964)	String Trio in G Major
Alessandro Rolla (1757–1841)	String Trio in E♭ major, Op. 11; String Trios, BI 341, 342, 343, 344, 346, 347, 348, 349, 351, 397, 405, 410
Julius Röntgen (1855–1932)	1915 - String trio D major op. 76; 1918 - Trio A minor; 1919 - Trio E minor, Walzer Suite D major; 1920 - Trio B minor, Trio F♯ minor, Trio G major; 1923 - Trio A major, Trio A♭ major, Trio F minor; 1925 - Trio G minor, Trio A major, Trio A major; 1928 - Trio C minor; 1929 - Trio C minor (Auto Trio ('Car Trio')); 1930 - Trio C♯ minor
Guy Ropartz (1864–1955)	Trio in A minor for Strings (1934–35)
Albert Roussel (1896–1937)	String Trio, Op. 58
Kaija Saariaho (1952–2023)	Cloud Trio (2009)
Ernest Sauter (1928–2013)	Trio no. 1 (1999); Ballade (2001); Trio No. 3, Trois mouvements contrastés (2007)
Giacinto Scelsi (1905–1988)	Trio for strings (1958)
Alfred Schnittke (1934–1998)	String Trio (1985)
Arnold Schoenberg (1874–1951)	String Trio, Op. 45 (1946)
Franz Schubert (1797–1828)	String Trios in B♭ major, D 111A (1814), D 471 (1816) and D 581 (1817) (Berger 2001, 373)
Jean Sibelius (1865–1957)	Suite (Trio) in A major (1889, revised 1912); Trio in G minor (1893–94)
Otto Siegl (1896–1978)	Divertimento, op. 44 (1924); Trio in B♭ major, op. 130 (1943)
Robert Simpson (1921–1997)	String Trio (1987)
Nikos Skalkottas (1904–1949)	String Trio No. 2 (1935)
Karlheinz Stockhausen (1928–2007)	Hoffnung (2007) (Günther 2008)
Richard Strauss (1864–1949)	Variations on "Das Dirndl is harb auf mi" TRV 109 (1882)
Sergei Taneyev (1856–1915)	String Trio in D major (1880)
Pyotr Ilyich Tchaikovsky (1840–1893)	Allegretto moderato (1863–64)
Jesús Torres (1965)	String Trio (2002)
Heitor Villa-Lobos (1887–1959)	String Trio (1945)
Graham Waterhouse (born 1962)	Epitaphium (2007); Zeichenstaub (2010)
Julian Wagstaff (born 1970)	In Extremis (2011)()
Rolf Wallin (1957–)	Sway (2010)
Anton Webern (1883–1945)	Satz for String Trio, Op. posth.; String Trio (1927), his first instrumental work using the twelve tone technique
Egon Wellesz (1885–1974)	String Trio, Op. 86 (1962); Four Works for string trio, Op. 105 (1969, second version 1971)
John Woolrich (born 1954)	String Trio (1996)
Charles Wuorinen (1938–2020)	String Trio (1968)
Iannis Xenakis (1922–2001)	Ikhoor {Ιχώρ} (1978)
La Monte Young (born 1935)	Trio (1958)
Eugène Ysaÿe (1858–1931)	Trio "Le Chimay"(1915)
Bernd Alois Zimmermann (1918–1970)	Trio (1944)

=== Two violins, cello ===
Composer	Composition
Alexander Alyabyev (1787–1851)	Variations on a Russian folk song
Ludwig van Beethoven (1770–1827)	Prelude and Fugue for two violins and cello in E minor, Hess 29 (1795)
Luigi Boccherini (1743–1805)	String Trios, G 77–94, 101–106, 113–36, 577–78 (for some of the trios, authorship is uncertain); Divertimenti G 137–42 (authorship doubtful)
Alexander Borodin (1833–1887)	String Trio in G minor on a Russian folk song
Siegfried Borris (1906–1987)	Terzettino
Werner Egk (1901–1983)	Trio in G minor
Joseph Gehot (1756–1820)	String Trios, Op. 5, Nos. 1–6
Avgust Grigoryevich Gerke (1790–1847)	Trio pour deux violons et violoncelle op. 2
Peter Hänsel (1770–1831)	String Trio in D major; String Trio in F major; String Trio in C major; Streichtrio in F major, Op. 40, No. 1; Streichtrio in G minor, Op. 40, No. 2; Streichtrio in E major, Op. 40, No. 3
Joseph Haydn (1732–1809)	String Trios, Hob. V:1–21 (except Hob. V:8); String Trios, Hob. V:F1, D1, B1, G1, D3, A2, C1, C4 (authorship doubtful)
Franz Anton Hoffmeister (1754–1812)	6 String Trios, Op. 22; 3 String Trios, Op. 37; 6 Trios Progressives, Op. 28
Feliks Janiewicz (1762–1848)	6 String Trios
Joachim Kaczkowski (1789–1829)	Quatre variations op. 3 Six variations op. 4
Wilhelm Killmayer (1927-2017)	Trio for two violins and cello
Karol Lipiński (1790-1861)	String Trio in g minor Op. 8 String Trio in A-major Op. 12
Wolfgang Amadeus Mozart (1756–1791)	String Trio in B♭ KV 266/271f (1777); Trio in G (after Duo KV 423, arr. Gerhard Präsent; Trio in B♭ (after Duo KV 424, arr. Gerhard Präsent
Ignaz Pleyel (1757–1831)	6 String Trios, B 404–409; 3 String Trios, B 410–12; 3 String Trios, B 413–15
Johann Mederitsch (1752–1835)	Fantasia Terza
Gerhard Präsent (born 1957)	Big Ben for string trio (2012); Tres Dados for string trio (2013–15); A-Suite for string trio (2018)
Joseph Schuster (1748–1812)	String Trio in A minor
Johann Baptist Wanhal (1739–1813)	String Trios, Op. 5, Nos. 1–6; String Trios, Op. 12, Nos. 1–6; String Trios, Op. 17, Nos. 1–6

=== Two violins, viola ===
Composer	Composition
Frank Bridge (1879–1941)	Rhapsody Trio (1928)
Antonín Dvořák (1841–1904)	Terzetto in C major, Op. 74; Drobnosti (Miniatures), Op. 75a
Robert Fuchs (1847–1927)	2 Terzetten, Op. 61; Terzett in C♯ minor, Op. 107
Zoltán Kodály (1882–1967)	Serenade, for two violins and viola
David Ludwig (born 1974)	Rule of Three for two violins and viola (2016)
Sergei Taneyev (1856–1915)	String Trio in D major, Op. 21 (1907)

=== Alternative scoring ===
Composer	Composition
F.L. Gaßmann (1729–1774)	String Trio in E♭ major, for 2 violas and cello; String Trio in B♭ major, for 2 violas and cello
Sergei Taneyev (1856–1915)	String Trio in E♭ major, Op. 31, for violin, viola and violotta
John Zorn (born 1953)	Walpurgisnacht (2004) for violin, viola and double bass

== See also ==
- String quintet – Musical piece for five string players
- String sextet – Music composition for six instruments
- String octet – Music composition for eight instruments

== Sources ==
- Berger, Melvin. 2001. Guide to Chamber Music, third, corrected edition. Mineola, NY: Dover Publications. ISBN 978-0-486-41879-7; ISBN 978-0-486-31672-7 (ebook).
- Davidson. n.d. "Music for String Trio by Matthew Davidson." composers.com Retrieved April 5, 2014.
- Günther, Andreas. 2008. "Karlheinz Stockhausen, HOFFNUNG (2007)". Programme book of the world première of Hoffnung, 31 August 2008, Cologne, by members of musikFabrik.
- Hochman, Gilad. n.d. "Brief Memories for String Trio (2004)" GiladHochman.com Retrieved April 5, 2014.
