= Serenade in C major =

Serenade in C major may refer to:

- Ganz kleine Nachtmusik (Mozart)
- Serenade for Strings (Tchaikovsky)
- Serenade (Dohnányi)
