= Frederick Stock =

German conductor and composer (1872–1942)

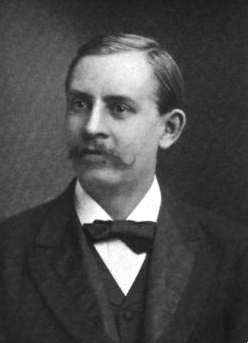
Stock in 1904

Frederick Stock (born Friedrich August Stock; November 11, 1872 – October 20, 1942) was a German and American conductor and composer, most famous for his 37-year tenure as music director of the Chicago Symphony Orchestra.

== Early life and education ==
Born in Jülich, Rhine Province, Germany, Stock was given his early musical education by his army bandmaster father. At the age of 14, he was admitted to the Cologne Conservatory as a student of violin and composition, where he counted composer Engelbert Humperdinck as one of his teachers and conductor Willem Mengelberg among his classmates. After graduating from the conservatory in 1890, Stock joined the Municipal Orchestra of Cologne as a violinist.

== Career ==
In 1895, Stock met with Theodore Thomas, founder and first music director of the then fledgling Chicago Symphony Orchestra, who was to have a decisive impact on his future. Thomas, who was then visiting Germany in search of recruits for his new Chicago orchestra, auditioned Stock and hired him as a violist. Thomas soon realized, however, that his new violist was also a very talented conductor and, in 1899, Stock was promoted to assistant conductor.

After Thomas' death on January 4, 1905, Stock succeeded him as music director. That year, he wrote a symphonic poem Eines Menschenlebens Morgen, Mittag und Abend, dedicated to "Theodore Thomas and the Members of the Chicago Orchestra." The work was first performed on April 7 and 8, 1905.

The orchestra's board of trustees had first approached Hans Richter, Felix Weingartner and Felix Mottl to succeed Thomas. But the board's executive committee met on April 11, 1905, and resolved: "Frederick Stock unanimously elected Conductor. Trustees voted that the Orchestra should now be known as 'The Theodore Thomas Orchestra.'" (The ensemble's name was ultimately changed to Chicago Symphony Orchestra in 1913.)

Under Stock's direction, the Chicago Symphony became one of America's top orchestras, developing a distinctive brass sound already heard in its first recordings. An enthusiast of modern music, Stock championed the works of many then modern composers including Gustav Mahler; Richard Strauss (who, at Theodore Thomas's invitation, had been the CSO's first-ever guest conductor on subscription concerts in April 1904); Igor Stravinsky, whose Symphony in C was commissioned for the orchestra's 50th anniversary; Sergei Prokofiev, who was soloist in the world premiere of his Third Piano Concerto in Chicago (although he recorded it in 1932 with the London Symphony); Gustav Holst; Zoltán Kodály, whose Concerto for Orchestra was commissioned by Stock; Nikolai Myaskovsky, whose Symphony No. 21 was commissioned for the orchestra's 50th anniversary; Josef Suk; William Walton; Arthur Benjamin; George Enescu; Leo Sowerby; and many others. Stock and the Chicago Symphony debuted the Symphony in E minor by Florence Price on June 15, 1933, Price's first symphony and the first composition by an African-American woman to be played by a major orchestra. Stock's most memorable recordings were of Romantic repertory by Schubert, Schumann, Weber, Goldmark and Glazunov.

In 1936, when Stock was less and less able to conduct himself, Hans Lange, formerly Arturo Toscanini's assistant with the New York Philharmonic, was hired to conduct those CSO concerts Stock could no longer conduct. He remained at the CSO during Désiré Defauw's tenure, and was a mentor of Chicago composer Leon Stein.

Stock died in Chicago on 20 October 1942.

== Recorded legacy ==
In May 1916, the Chicago Symphony Orchestra, under Stock's baton, made its first set of recordings for the Columbia Graphophone Company label in Chicago (the specific location is not documented); the first piece recorded on May 1, 1916, was the Wedding March from Felix Mendelssohn's Incidental Music for A Midsummer Night's Dream. The orchestra later made its first electrical recordings for the Victor Talking Machine Company in December 1925, including superbly idiomatic performances of Karl Goldmark's In Springtime overture and Robert Schumann's First ("Spring") Symphony; these early recordings were made in Victor's Chicago studios and within a couple of years the orchestra was recorded in Orchestra Hall, its home. Abandoning recording for several years after 1930, the CSO then returned to Columbia for a long series of recordings, only to finally return to RCA Victor in 1941–1942 for its final series of recordings under Stock, whose last studio recording, Ernest Chausson's Symphony in B-flat, was released posthumously in 1943.

Stock's 37-year tenure as head of the Chicago Symphony Orchestra was surpassed in the United States only by Eugene Ormandy's 42 years as music director of the Philadelphia Orchestra. After Stock's death in 1942, Désiré Defauw was chosen as his successor.

=== Notable recordings ===
- Johann Sebastian Bach: Suite No. 2 in B minor, BWV 1067 (Ernst Liegl, flute [appointed CSO principal flute in 1928] (December 1927, Victor)
- Johann Sebastian Bach: St. Anne Prelude and Fugue in E-flat major, BWV 552 (arr. Frederick Stock) (December 1941, RCA Victor)
- Ludwig van Beethoven: Piano Concertos Nos. 4 & 5 "Emperor" (with Artur Schnabel) (July 1942, RCA Victor)

External audio
- You may listen to Frederick Stock conducting his orchestral transcription of Johann Sebastian Bach's St. Anne Prelude and Fugue in E-flat major, BWV 552 with the Chicago Symphony Orchestra in 1942 here on archive.org
- You may listen to Frederick Stock conducting Ludwig van Beethoven's Piano Concertos No. 4 & 5 Emperor with the Chicago Symphony Orchestra and Artur Schnabel in 1942 here on archive.org

- Arthur Benjamin: Overture to an Italian Comedy (December 1941, RCA Victor)
- Johannes Brahms: Hungarian Dances Nos. 17-21 (December 1926, Victor)
- Johannes Brahms: Symphony No. 3 in F major, Op. 90 (New York, November 1940, Columbia)
- Johannes Brahms: Tragic Overture, Op. 81 and Minuet from Serenade No. 1 (Chicago, 1941, Columbia)
- Ernest Chausson: Symphony in B-flat, Op. 20 (1942, RCA Victor)
- Ernő Dohnányi: Suite in F-sharp minor, Opus 19 (December 1928, Victor; world premiere recording)
- Antonín Dvořák: In Nature's Realm Overture, Op.91 (December 1941, RCA Victor)
- Sir Edward Elgar: Pomp and Circumstance March No. 1 in D (December 1926, Victor)
- George Enescu: Romanian Rhapsody No. 1 (April 1941, Columbia)
- Aleksandr Glazunov: Concert Waltzes in F major and D major (c. 1940, Columbia)
- Karl Goldmark: In Springtime Overture, Op. 36 (December 1925, Victor)
- Wolfgang Amadeus Mozart: Symphony No. 38 in D major, K. 504 "Prague" (November 1939, Columbia)
- Wolfgang Amadeus Mozart: Symphony No. 40 in G minor, K. 550 (December 1930, RCA Victor)
- Nicolo Paganini: Moto perpetuo, Op. 11 (orch. Stock) (April 1941, Columbia)
- Camille Saint-Saëns: Cello Concerto No. 1 in A minor, Op. 33 (with Gregor Piatigorsky) (March 1940, Columbia)
- Camille Saint-Saëns: Danse Macabre, Op. 40 (January 1940, Columbia)
- Franz Schubert: Symphony No. 9 in C major, D. 944 "The Great" (January 1940, Columbia)

External audio
- You may listen to Frederick Stock conducting Franz Schubert's Symphony No. 9 in C major The Great, D. 944 with the Chicago Symphony Orchestra in 1940 here on archive.org

- Robert Schumann: Symphony No. 1 in B-flat, Op. 38 "Spring" (December 1929, RCA Victor)
- Robert Schumann: Symphony No. 4 in D minor, Op. 120 (April 1941, Columbia)**
- Jean Sibelius: The Swan of Tuonela (from the Four Legends of the Kalevala, Op. 22) (November 1939 or January 1940, Columbia)
- Frederick Stock: Symphonic Waltz, Op. 8 (December 1930, RCA Victor)
- Richard Strauss: Also Sprach Zarathustra, Op. 30 (January, 1940, Columbia)
- Richard Strauss: On the Shores of Sorrento from Aus Italien, Op. 16 (December 1941, RCA Victor)
- Josef Suk: Folk Dance (à la Polka) from A Fairy Tale (December 1926, Victor)
- Peter Ilich Tchaikovsky: The Nutcracker - Suite, Op. 71a (November 1939, Columbia)
- Peter Ilich Tchaikovsky: Symphony No. 5 in E minor, Op. 64 (December 1928, Victor)
- Peter Ilich Tchaikovsky: Violin Concerto, Op. 35 (with Nathan Milstein) (March 1940, Columbia)

External audio
- You may listen to Frederick Stock conducting Pyotr Ilyich Tchaikovsky's Violin Concerto in D major, Op. 35 with the Chicago Symphony Orchestra and Nathan Milstein in 1940 here on archive.org

- Ernst Toch: Pinocchio - A Merry Overture (April 1941, Columbia)
- Richard Wagner: Die Meistersinger von Nürnberg - Prelude to Act I (December 1926, Victor)
- William Walton: Scapino, a Comedy Overture (April 1941, Columbia)
- Carl Maria von Weber: Euryanthe Overture (January 1940, Columbia)

== Works ==
Several of Frederick Stock's compositions were performed by the Chicago Symphony Orchestra during his tenure as conductor including:

- Eines Menschenlebens Morgen, Mittag und Abend (1905)
- Symphonic Variations (1906)
- Improvisation (1907)
- Symphonic Waltz Op. 8 (1907)
- A Summer Evening, symphonic sketch (1908)
- Symphony No. 1 in C minor (1909)
- Festival March (1910)
- Festival March and Hymn to Liberty (1913)
- Life's Spring Tide, overture (1914)
- Festival Prologue (1915)
- Concerto for Violin in D minor (1916)
- Overture to a Romantic Comedy (1918)
- March and Hymn to Democracy (1919)
- Symphonic Variations on an Original Theme, Op. 7 (1915)
- Elegy (1923)
- Concerto for Cello and Orchestra in D minor (1929)
- A Musical Self-Portrait (1932)
- Festival Fanfare (1940)
