= String Trio, Op. 3 (Beethoven) =

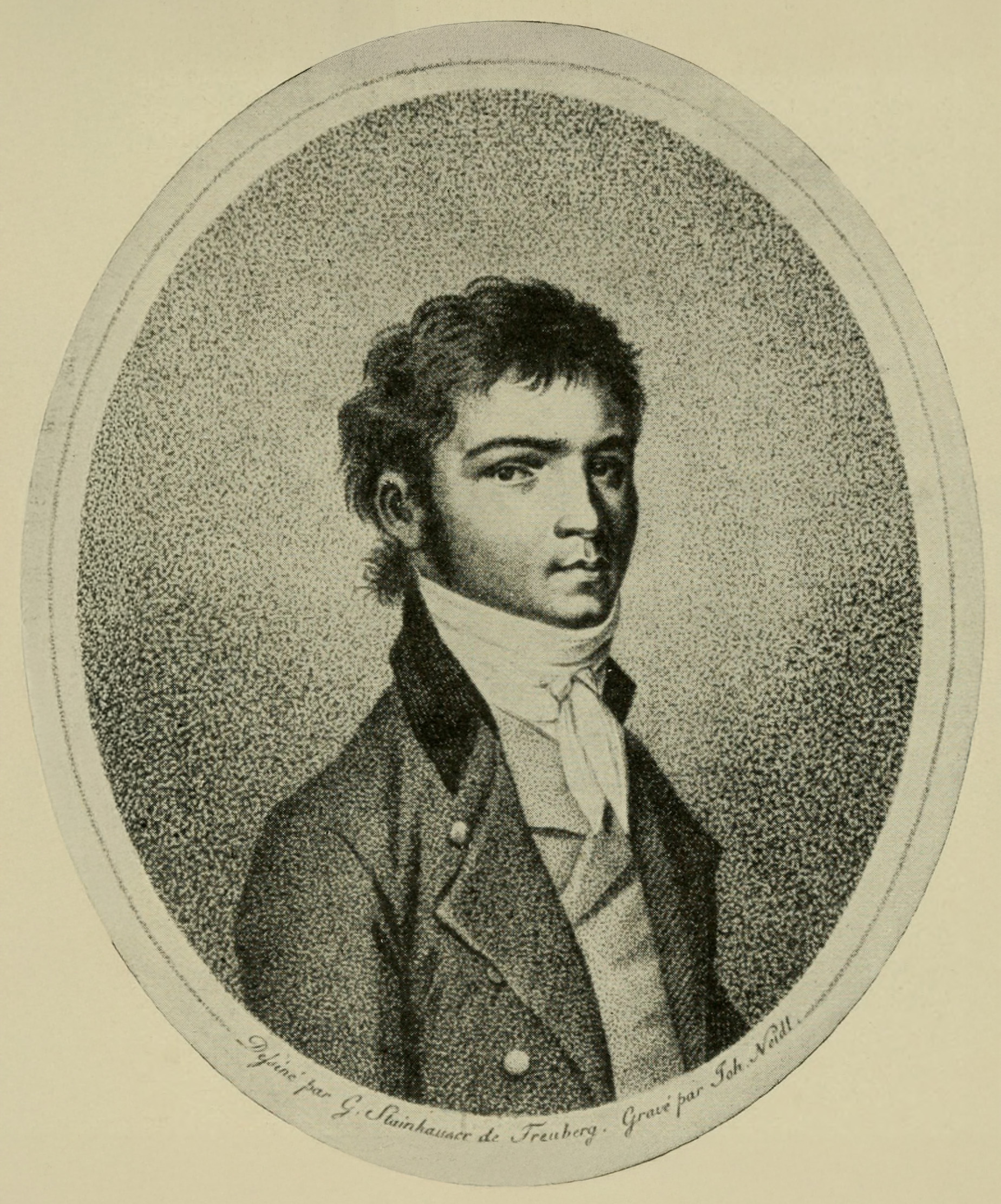
Ludwig van Beethoven, c. 1796

The String Trio in E♭ major, Op. 3 (String Trio No. 1) is a composition by Ludwig van Beethoven, his first for string trio (violin, viola and cello). It is a divertimento consisting of six movements, including two minuets. It may have been first sketched while Beethoven was still living in Bonn. It was published in 1797 by Artaria in Vienna.

The six movements are:

1. Allegro con brio
2. Andante
3. Menuetto: Allegretto
4. Adagio
5. Menuetto: Moderato
6. Finale: Allegro

== Transcriptions ==
=== Piano Trio (Hess 47) ===
Sometime prior to 1800, Beethoven arranged the first movement of the trio for piano, violin and cello (Hess 47): it has been speculated that the composer may have intended to transcribe the entire trio for the same forces but lost interest as the existing manuscript breaks off part way through a transcription of the second movement.

=== Cello Sonata Op. 64 ===
The trio was arranged for cello and piano (Op. 64): this was first published in 1807 by Artaria. The arrangement is thought to be not by the composer, with Keith Anderson pointing out that Artaria's title sheet for the transcription simply implies that Beethoven was involved without explicitly stating that he was.
