= Ruralia hungarica =

Musical composition by Dohnanyi

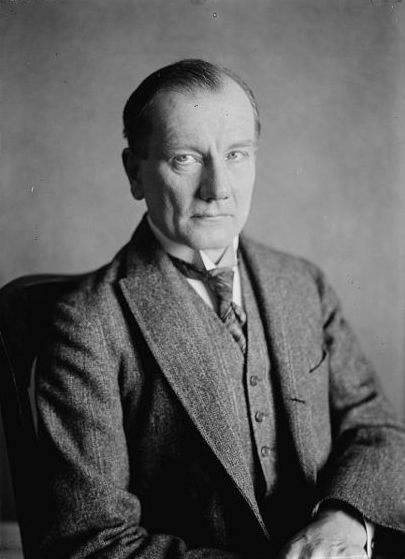
Ernő Dohnányi in the 1920s

Ruralia hungarica is a name given by the Hungarian composer Ernő Dohnányi to four interrelated works.

First came the version for solo piano, a suite containing seven movements, Op. 32a, in 1923:

1. Allegretto, molto tenero
2. Presto, ma non tanto
3. Andante poco moto, rubato
4. Vivace
5. Allegro grazioso
6. Adagio non troppo
7. Molto vivace

Five of these movements were then orchestrated, as Op. 32b, in 1924:

1. Andante poco moto, rubato
2. Presto, ma non tanto
3. Allegro grazioso
4. Adagio non troppo
5. Molto vivace

A version for violin and piano followed, as Op. 32c. This contained transcriptions of two of the existing pieces (Presto, ma non tanto; and Molto vivace), plus an entirely new piece as the second movement. That new piece, Andante rubato, is better known as the "Gypsy Andante" (Andante alla zingaresca), and under the bow of players like Jascha Heifetz and Fritz Kreisler it became a concert favourite separate from the suite of which it forms a part.

Dohnányi also arranged the "Gypsy Andante" from Op. 32c for cello and piano, as Op. 32d. There is also an arrangement of Op. 32d for cello and harp, and cello and orchestra.

The term "Gypsy Andante" is sometimes also applied to the Adagio non troppo movement of the orchestral suite.
