= Suite in F-sharp minor (Dohnányi) =

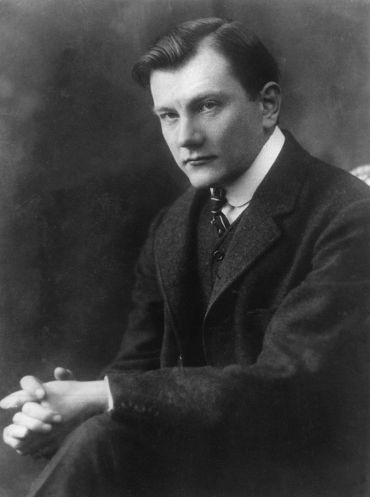
Ernő Dohnányi, c. 1900

The Suite in F♯ minor, Op. 19, sometimes called "Suite romantique", was written by Ernő Dohnányi in 1909, while he was teaching at the Berlin Hochschule für Musik. It is characterised by brilliant and lush scoring, and witty and engaging melodies with a Hungarian accent.

== History ==
Dohnányi wrote the Suite simultaneously with the pantomime The Veil of Pierrette, Op. 18. After completing the first two tableaux of Pierrette, he wrote the first two movements of the Suite, then completed Pierrette and then the Suite.

It had its premiere performance in Budapest on 21 February 1910, under the composer's baton. It was published in 1910.

The first performance in England was on 9 October 1913, at a Prom Concert in the Queen's Hall, London, under Sir Henry Wood.

The Suite takes 25 to 30 minutes to play. It is in four movements:

1. Andante con variazioni
2. Scherzo
3. Romanza
4. Rondo

== Orchestration ==
Dohnányi scored the Suite for piccolo, 2 flutes, 2 oboes, English horn, 2 clarinets, bass clarinet, 2 bassoons, contrabassoon, 4 horns, 2 trumpets, 3 trombones, 3 timpani, triangle, cymbals, snare drum, bass drum, castanets, 2 harps, and strings.

== Recordings ==
The first recording of the Suite in F♯ minor was by the Chicago Symphony Orchestra under Frederick Stock, in 1928.

Later recordings include:

- London Symphony Orchestra under Sir Malcolm Sargent
- Los Angeles Philharmonic under Alfred Wallenstein (who was principal cellist in the Chicago Symphony at the time of the 1928 Stock recording)
- Philharmonia Orchestra under Robert Irving (1955 mono recording, HMV CLP 1043)
- Royal Philharmonic Orchestra under Sargent
- Portland Junior Symphony Orchestra under Jacob Avshalomov
- West Australian Symphony Orchestra under Jorge Mester
- Budapest Symphony Orchestra under Tamás Vásáry
- BBC Philharmonic under Matthias Bamert
- Danubia Symphony Orchestra under Domonkos Héja
- Seattle Symphony under Milton Katims
- St. Louis Symphony under Leonard Slatkin.

== Arrangement ==
The violinist Jascha Heifetz arranged the Romanza for violin and piano.
