= String Trios, Op. 9 (Beethoven) =

Compositions by Ludwig van Beethoven

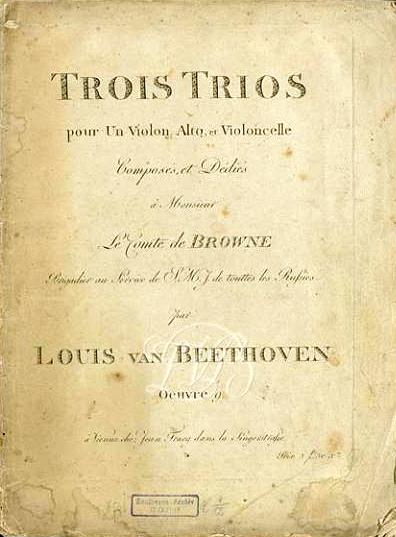
Title page of the first edition of the score, Vienna 1799

The three String Trios, Op. 9 were composed by Ludwig van Beethoven in 1797–98. He published the string trios in Vienna in 1799, with a dedication to his patron Count Johann Georg von Browne (1767–1827). They were first performed by the violinist Ignaz Schuppanzigh with two colleagues from his string quartet. According to the violinist and conductor Angus Watson, these were probably Franz Weiss on viola and either Nikolaus Kraft or his father Anton on cello. Each of the trios consists of four movements:

String Trio No. 3 in G major, Op. 9 No. 1

1. Adagio - Allegro con brio
2. Adagio ma non tanto e cantabile
3. Scherzo – Allegro
4. Presto

String Trio No. 4 in D major, Op. 9 No. 2

1. Allegretto
2. Andante quasi allegretto
3. Menuetto – Allegretto
4. Rondo – Allegro

String Trio No. 5 in C minor, Op. 9 No. 3

1. Allegro con spirito
2. Adagio con espressione
3. Scherzo – Allegro molto e vivace
4. Finale – Presto

== Music ==
Op. 9 No. 1: Adagio – Allegro con brio

Although this opus does not contain the most played works by Beethoven it was a significant milestone in his development as a composer. At the time of publication the 28-year-old Beethoven regarded the trios as his best compositions. The trios can be seen as a part of the preparation for the upcoming string quartets, which became the leading genre among his chamber music. The musicologist Gerald Abraham has remarked that in terms of their style and aesthetic value the string trios of Op. 9 rank with Beethoven's first string quartets which ousted the trios from the concert halls. Beethoven composed no further trios after the first quartets (Op. 18) were published in 1801. Each trio is of four movements with sonata form in the first movements, suggesting that Beethoven did not intend them to be light chamber pieces.

The most vigorous of the three trios is perhaps the G major, with the fast movements' thematic richness and almost symphonic elaborations especially in the first Allegro. The Adagio in E major resembles in its beauty and melancholic atmosphere other slow movements written by Beethoven at that time. The trio ends with a brilliant and virtuoso Presto.

Trio in D major is the most traditional piece in the opus. It lacks the G major's symphonic effects but conveys a finely subtle chamber music with warm and intimate atmosphere. However the slow movement in D minor is perhaps the saddest piece in the opus.

The last trio, in C minor, brings the most energy and novelty with highly passionate tone. C minor is one of Beethoven's most important keys. Three of his piano sonatas and the fifth symphony were written in C minor, for instance. This trio invokes those later works' power and peculiar character so typical of Beethoven. Dynamic effects, sharp contrasts in rhythm, harmonic confrontations among other means of music provide momentum and the tone of anxiety. By contrast, the Adagio brings peace and resignation in C major, with a more lively episode in E♭ major in the middle of the movement. Both the Scherzo and the Finale continue the passionate and energetic storm of the first movement.
