= Johann Georg von Browne =

Soldier and patron of Beethoven

Count Johann Georg von Browne
- Born: 20 September 1767; Riga, Russian Empire
- Died: January 1827 (aged 59); Vienna, Austrian Empire
- Other names: Johann Georg von Browne-Camus
- Notable work: Patron of Ludwig van Beethoven
- Spouse: Anna Margaretha von Vietinghoff
- Father: George Browne

Count Johann Georg von Browne (or Johann Georg von Browne-Camus) (Riga, 20 September 1767 – Vienna, January 1827) was an officer in the Russian army, and settled in Vienna where he was a patron of Ludwig van Beethoven during the composer's early career.

== Life ==
Von Browne was born in Riga in 1767. His father was George Browne, an Irish soldier of fortune who became an officer in the Imperial Russian Army from 1730, reaching the rank of general.

Von Browne became a brigadier general in the Russian army. He moved with his wife to Vienna about 1794; his income came from his estates in Livonia. He was a patron of Ludwig van Beethoven during the composer's early career; Beethoven often visited his house, and his compositions were often performed there. Ferdinand Ries, a pupil of Beethoven, was through his recommendation appointed piano player at von Browne's house.

Several of Beethoven's compositions, from 1798 to 1803, were dedicated to von Browne: the String Trios, Op. 9, in which the composer calls him "Premiere Mécène de sa Muse" ("foremost patron of his muse"); Seven Variations for cello and piano in E-flat major on "Bei Männern welche Liebe fühlen" from Mozart's The Magic Flute, WoO 46; Piano Sonata No. 11, Op. 22; and Gellert-Lieder, Op. 48. Beethoven's Piano Sonatas Op. 10 were dedicated to the Count's wife Anna Margaretha, daughter of Otto Hermann von Vietinghoff and sister of Barbara von Krüdener.

The Count's majordomo, Hofrat Johannes Büel, said that von Browne was "one of the strangest of men, on the one hand full of excellent talents and splendid qualities of heart and mind, and on the other full of weaknesses and depravity". He spent some years in a mental institution after a mental breakdown.
