= Désiré Defauw =

Conductor, violinist

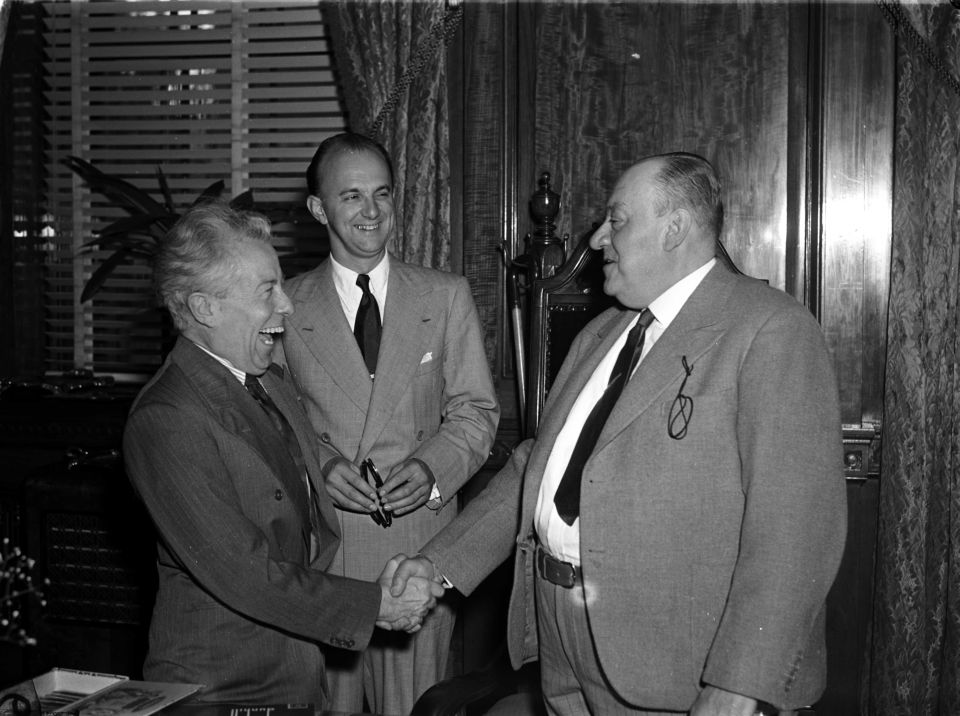
- The Mayor of Montreal, Camillien Houde, shakes hands with Desiré Defeau under the eyes of the impresario Peter Béique.
- Born: 5 September 1885; Ghent
- Died: 25 July 1960 (aged 74); Gary, Indiana
- Occupations: violinist, conductor

Désiré Defauw (5 September 1885, Ghent, Belgium – 25 July 1960, Gary, Indiana, United States) was a Belgian conductor and violinist.

Defauw was a pupil of the violinist Johan Smit (1862–1932) and gave his first London performances in 1910. During World War I he became a refugee working in London, founding the Allied Quartet with Charles Woodhouse (second violin), Lionel Tertis and Emile Doehaerd. In 1917 he appeared at the Steinway Hall on 26 June 1917 to perform the first British performance of Debussy's Violin Sonata with Joseph Jongen, about six weeks after the French premiere. The same year he also appeared at the Wigmore Hall performing John Ireland's Violin Sonata No. 2 with the composer at the piano.

He was professor of conducting at the Brussels Conservatory and was the first conductor of the Orchestre National de Belgique from 1937. He left Belgium for North America in 1940 and was music director of the Montreal Symphony Orchestra from 1941 to 1952. Following the death of Frederick Stock in 1942, Defauw was appointed third music director of the Chicago Symphony Orchestra, serving in that post from 1943 to 1947. Among numerous recordings he made in Chicago, all for RCA Victor, Defauw recorded Pyotr Ilyich Tchaikovsky's Violin Concerto with Erica Morini and the first recording ever made of Serge Prokofiev's Scythian Suite, both in 1945, Carl Maria von Weber's Konzertstuck and Richard Strauss' Burlesque with pianist Claudio Arrau, both in 1946 and Felix Mendelssohn's Violin Concerto with Mischa Elman as soloist and Alexander Borodin's Symphony No.2, both in 1947.

Defauw later served as music director of the Gary Symphony Orchestra in Gary, Indiana, from 1950 to 1958, and the Grand Rapids Symphony in Grand Rapids, Michigan, from 1954 to 1958, retiring through ill-health. He was simultaneously the conductor of the Bloomington-Normal Symphony Orchestra (IL) from 1953 to 1958. During this time, in lived in Portage, Indiana, near Gary. He died there on 25 July 1960.

== Sources ==
- Foreman, Lewis (ed). The John Ireland Companion Woodbridge: The Boydell Press, 2011. ISBN 978-1-84383-686-5
