= Peter Hänsel =

German-Austrian musician and composer (1770–1831)

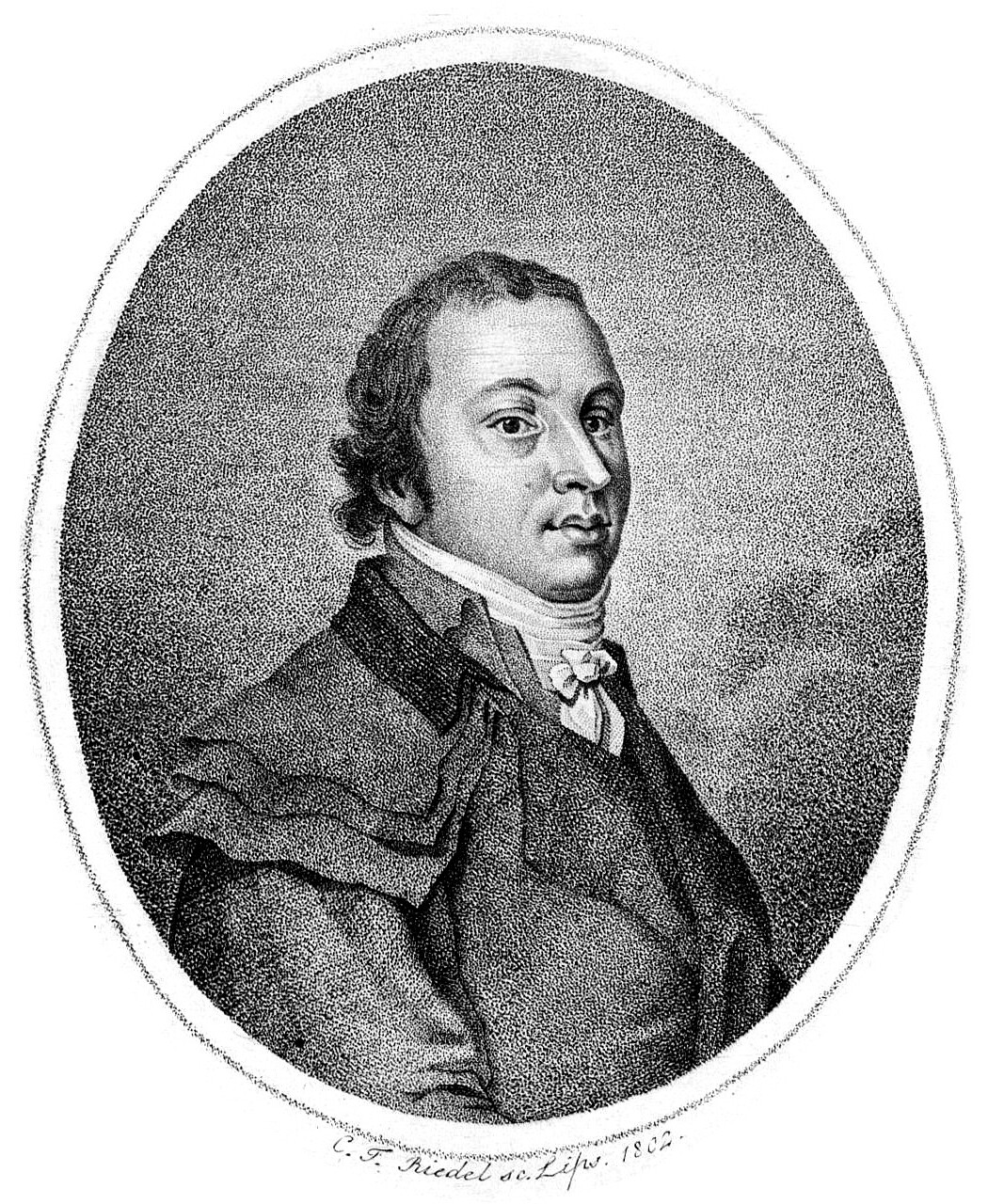
- Peter Hänsel on a portrait by artist Carl Traugott Riedel

Background information
- Born: 29 November 1770; Leppe, Silesia Province
- Died: 18 September 1831 (aged 60) Vienna

Peter Hänsel (born 29 November 1770 in Leppe, Silesia Province; d. 18 September 1831 in Vienna) was a German-Austrian violinist and classical composer of almost exclusively chamber music. He has been recently viewed not only as the principal representative of the true quartet school of Joseph Haydn and Wolfgang Amadeus Mozart, but also the composer responsible for incorporating French and Polish influences into the Viennese classical style, thus serving as mediator between Germany, France and Poland.

Like his contemporary Ludwig van Beethoven (1770–1827), he was one of Haydn's composition pupils during the 1790s. He died in Vienna shortly before his 61st birthday.

== Life and works ==
After a musical apprenticeship with his uncle in 1787 in Warsaw, Hänsel traveled to Russia and joined the orchestra of Prince Grigory Alexandrovich Potemkin in St. Petersburg, which at the time was under the direction of master Giuseppe Sarti. In 1788 he returned to Warsaw after the completion of his contract. In the spring of 1791 he was concert master at the court of Princess Izabela Lubomirska in Vienna, where he was employed from 1796 with a fixed annual salary. Hänsel took lessons with Joseph Haydn in 1802, maintaining a relatively conservative compositional style throughout his career. After learning as much as he could from Haydn he then traveled to Paris where he lived from 1802 to 1803, later returning to Vienna.

He created a comprehensive volume of 58 string quartets, 6 string trios, 4 quintets, 3 quartets with flute and clarinet, 9 violin duets, also Variations, Polonaises, Rondos, Marches and numerous other musical pieces for keyboard and strings.

== See also ==
- Classical music
- Romantic music

== Literature ==
- Constantin von Wurzbach: Hänsel, Peter. In: Biographisches Lexikon des Kaiserthums Oesterreich. Vol. 7, Publisher Zamarski LC, Vienna 1856-1891, p. 182
