= Franz Xaver Kleinheinz =

Austrian composer (1765–1832)

Franz Xaver Kleinheinz (26 June 1765 – 29 January 1832) was an Austrian composer, piano teacher and Kapellmeister.

== Life ==
Born in Nassenbeuren near Mindelheim, Kleinheinz first went to Munich and in 1799 to Vienna, where he met Beethoven and soon became a sought-after piano teacher. His pupils included Giulietta Guicciardi and the sisters Therese Brunsvik and Josephine Brunsvik. From 1805, he took up a second residence in Brno and in August 1810 he was appointed as Kapellmeister in Bratislava. At the beginning of May 1813, it is said that Kleinheinz, "one of the most excellent piano players", had resigned from his post in Pressburg and returned to Vienna. From 1814 to 1824, he worked as a conductor at the Deutsches Theater in Pest.

Kleinheinz died in Pest at the age of 66.

== Works ==
- Fantaisie Sonate pour le Piano-Forte composée et dédiée à Son Excellence Madame la Comtesse de Brunsvik Maythény, op. 7, Vienna: Joseph Eder [1801]
- Sonate pour le Pianoforte avec l'Accompagnement d'un Violon obligé, composée et dédiée à Mad. la Comtesse Therese de Brunswik, op. 9 (Numerized)
- Hektors Abschied (Schiller) op. 10 für 1–2 Singstimmen und Cembalo, Vienna: Kunst- und Industrie-Comptoir [1802]
- Der Handschuh (Schiller) op. 11 für Singstimme und Cembalo, Wien: Kunst- und Industrie-Comptoir [1802]
- Grande Sonate pour le Piano-Forte à quatre mains, composée et dediée aux Demoiselles les Comtesses Julie et Henriette de Brunswick, op. 12, Vienna: Kunst- und Industrie-Comptoir
- Trio für Klarinette, Violoncello und Klavier op. 13, Vienna: Bureau d'Arts et d'Industrie, 1802
- Der Kampf (Schiller) op. 14 für Gesang und Klavier, "dem Herrn Grafen Georg von Bérényi gewidmet", Vienna: Kunst- u. Industrie Comptoir
- Trois grandes sonates pour le fortepiano, ou clavecin op. 17, Leipzig: Hoffmeister und Kühnel [1803]
- La passione di Gesù Cristo, 1813
- Serenade for flute (or violin) and piano op. 41 by Ludwig van Beethoven, arranged by Franz Xaver Kleinheinz
- Notturno D-Dur für Klavier und Viola op. 42 by Ludwig van Beethoven, arranged by Franz Xaver Kleinheinz
- Die Empfehlungsfeier. Schlußkantate bey Gelegenheit der ersten Vorstellung unter der neuen Direktion des Herrn Johann Baptist Mayer, den 15. April von der Gesellschaft abgesungen. Die Worte sind von Herrn Tobias Frech E. v. Ehrimfeld. Die Musik von Franz Xaver Kleinheinz, Kapellmeister des k. städtischen Nationaltheaters in Brünn, Brünn: Franz Karl Siedler 1805 (Numerized)
