= Variations on a Nursery Tune (Dohnányi) =

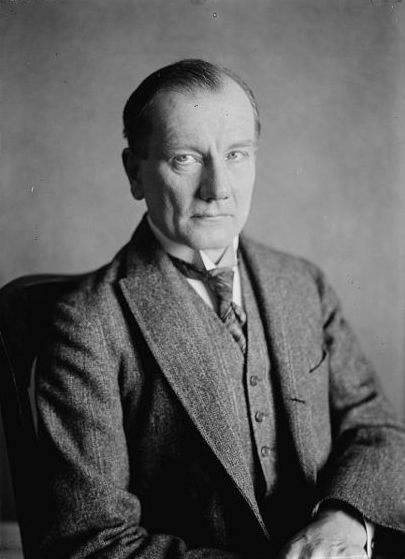
Ernő Dohnányi in the 1920s

The Variations on a Nursery Tune for piano and orchestra, Op. 25, were written by Ernst von Dohnányi in 1914. It is subtitled "For the enjoyment of friends of humor, to the annoyance of others" (Freunden des Humors zur Freude, den Anderen zum Ärger) on the manuscript, though he omitted this inscription on the concert program and on the published edition, fearing that it might sound somewhat provocative. The work was premiered in Berlin on 17 February 1914.

== Structure ==
The Variations on a Nursery Tune consist of an introduction and theme, eleven variations and a coda.

- Introduction. Maestoso
- Theme. Allegro
- Variation I. Poco più mosso
- Variation II. Risoluto
- Variation III. L'istesso tempo
- Variation IV. Molto meno mosso (Allegretto moderato)
- Variation V. Più mosso
- Variation VI. Ancora più mosso (Allegro)
- Variation VII. Walzer (Tempo giusto)
- Variation VIII. Alla marcia (Allegro moderato)
- Variation IX. Presto
- Variation X. Passacaglia (Adagio non troppo)
- Variation XI. Choral (Maestoso)
- Finale fugato (Allegro vivace)

After a dramatic introduction, the theme – Twinkle, Twinkle, Little Star – is introduced, followed by eleven variations on it, including a waltz and a more serious passacaglia.

Dohnányi alludes to many different works, or composers' distinctive compositional styles, in the piece. For instance, variation 8 suggests the march from the second movement of Tchaikovsky's "Little Russian" Symphony. Debussy is alluded to, with the ethereal harmonies of the 11th variation. Dohnányi pokes fun at nearly every composer his audience of 1914 would have been familiar with.

== Reception ==
The work made Dohnányi famous, particularly in England, where the audience "seemed to have a real sense of humor", and North America.
