= George Browne (soldier) =

Irish soldier of fortune in Russian service

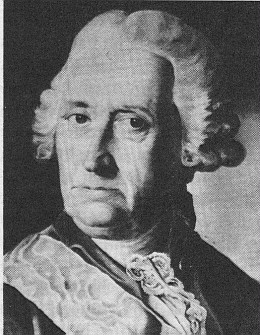
- George Browne
- Born: 15 June 1698; Limerick, Kingdom of Ireland
- Died: 18 February 1792 (aged 93); Riga, Governorate of Livonia, Russian Empire
- Military career
- Allegiance: Russia
- Branch: Imperial Russian Army
- Rank: General-in-chief
- Commands: Governor of Livonia
- Conflicts: Seven Years' War; Battle of Kolín; Battle of Zorndorf

George Browne (Russian: Юрий Юрьевич Броун, romanized: Yury Yuryevich Broun; Irish: Seoirse de Brún; German: Georg Reichsgraf von Browne, French: Georges de Browne), known as Count von Browne in the nobility of the Holy Roman Empire (15 June 1698 – 18 February 1792), was an Irish soldier of fortune who became full general in the Russian service.

== Biography ==
Browne was descended from a family that could trace its descent to the time of William the Conqueror, and had settled in Ireland at a very early period. His immediate ancestors were the Brownes of Camas, Limerick, where he was born 15 June 1698. He was educated at Limerick diocesan school.

A Catholic and a Jacobite, Browne, like several of his other relations, sought scope for his ambition in a foreign military career (Flight of the Wild Geese). In his twenty-seventh year he entered the service of the Electoral Palatinate, from which he passed in 1730 to that of Russian Empire. He distinguished himself in the Polish, French, and Turkish wars, and had risen to the rank of general, with the command of 30,000 men, when he was taken prisoner by the Turks. After being sold three times as a slave to an Albanian, he obtained his freedom through the intervention of the French ambassador Villeneuve, at the instance of the Russian court, and, remaining for some time at Constantinople in his slave's costume, succeeded in discovering important state secrets which he carried to Saint Petersburg.

In recognition of this special service Browne was raised by Anna to the rank of major-general, and in this capacity accompanied General Lacy on his first expedition to Finland. On the outbreak of the Swedish war his tactical skill was displayed to great advantage in checking Swedish attacks on Livonia. In the Seven Years' War he rendered important assistance as lieutenant-general under his cousin Maximilian Ulysses, Reichsgraf von Browne.

Browne's fortunate diversion of the enemy's attacks at Kolin, 18 June 1757, contributed materially to the allied victory, and in token of her appreciation of his conduct on the occasion Maria Theresa presented him with a snuff-box set with brilliants and adorned with her portrait. At Zorndorf, 25 August 1758, he again distinguished himself in a similar manner, his opportune assistance of the right wing at the most critical moment of the battle changing almost inevitable defeat into victory. By Peter III he was named general-in-chief, and appointed to the chief command in the Danish war.

On his addressing a remonstrance to the czar against the war as impolitic, Browne was deprived of his honours and commanded to leave the country, but the czar, repenting of his hasty decision, recalled him three days afterward and appointed him Governor of Livonia. He was confirmed in the office under Catherine II who granted him Smiltene Manor, and for thirty years to the close of his life administered its affairs with remarkable practical sagacity, and with great advantage both to the supreme government and to the varied interests of the inhabitants. He died 18 February 1792 in Riga. His remains were buried Close to those of his kinsman, Peter Lacy, in the crypt of the Catholic church in Skaistkalne, in southern Latvia

Browne's son Johann Georg von Browne, also an officer in the Russian army, was a patron of Ludwig van Beethoven.
