= Serenade for flute, violin and viola =

- by Ludwig van Beethoven
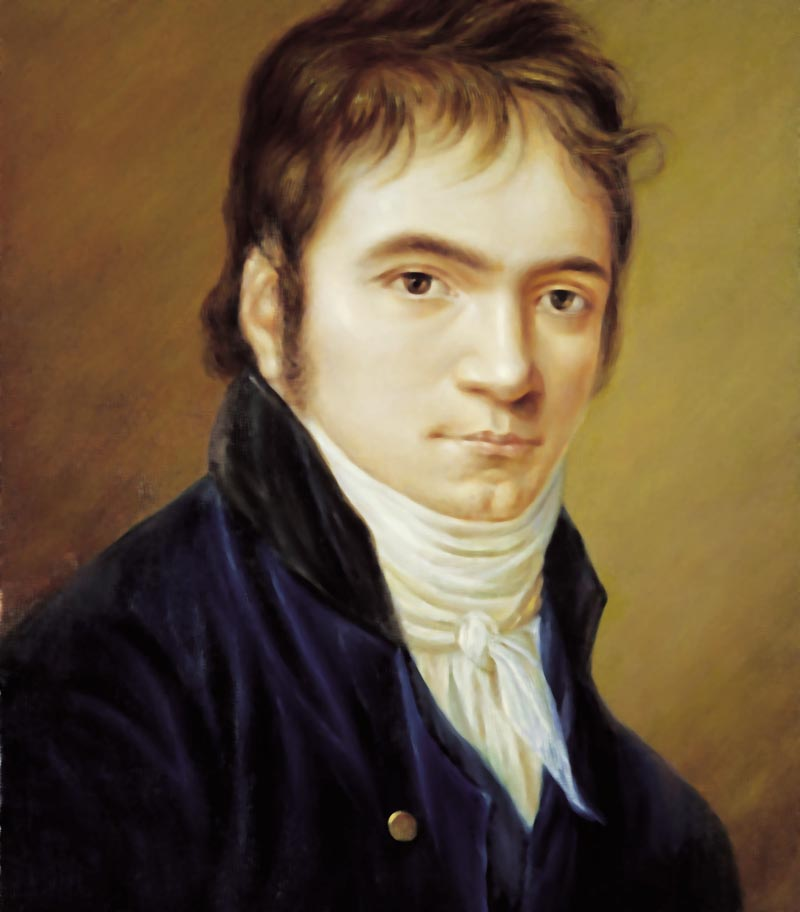
- Portrait of the composer in 1801
- Key: D major
- Opus: 25
- Composed: 1801
- Duration: 25 minutes
- Movements: 6

The Serenade for flute, violin and viola, Op. 25, is a chamber composition by Ludwig van Beethoven. It is in the key of D major.

== Composition ==
The serenade was written by Beethoven around 1801, though there are preliminary sketches from 1797 when Beethoven finished his earlier serenade Op. 8. The work was definitely finished by late 1801 when Beethoven offered it the publisher G. Cappi. In 1803, Franz Xaver Kleinheinz arranged the serenade for flute (or violin) and piano. Beethoven checked and approved this arrangement and it was printed as his Op. 41. Similar to his Septet of the same period, the work had great popular appeal and was profitable for the young composer.

The first movement appeared in the Baby Einstein video My First Signs.

== Structure ==
The work consists of six movements:

1. Entrata, Allegro
2. Tempo ordinario d'un Menuetto
3. Allegro molto
4. Andante con Variazioni
5. Allegro scherzando e vivace
6. Adagio – Allegro vivace e disinvolto
