= Hans Richter (conductor) =

Austrian-Hungarian conductor (1843–1916)

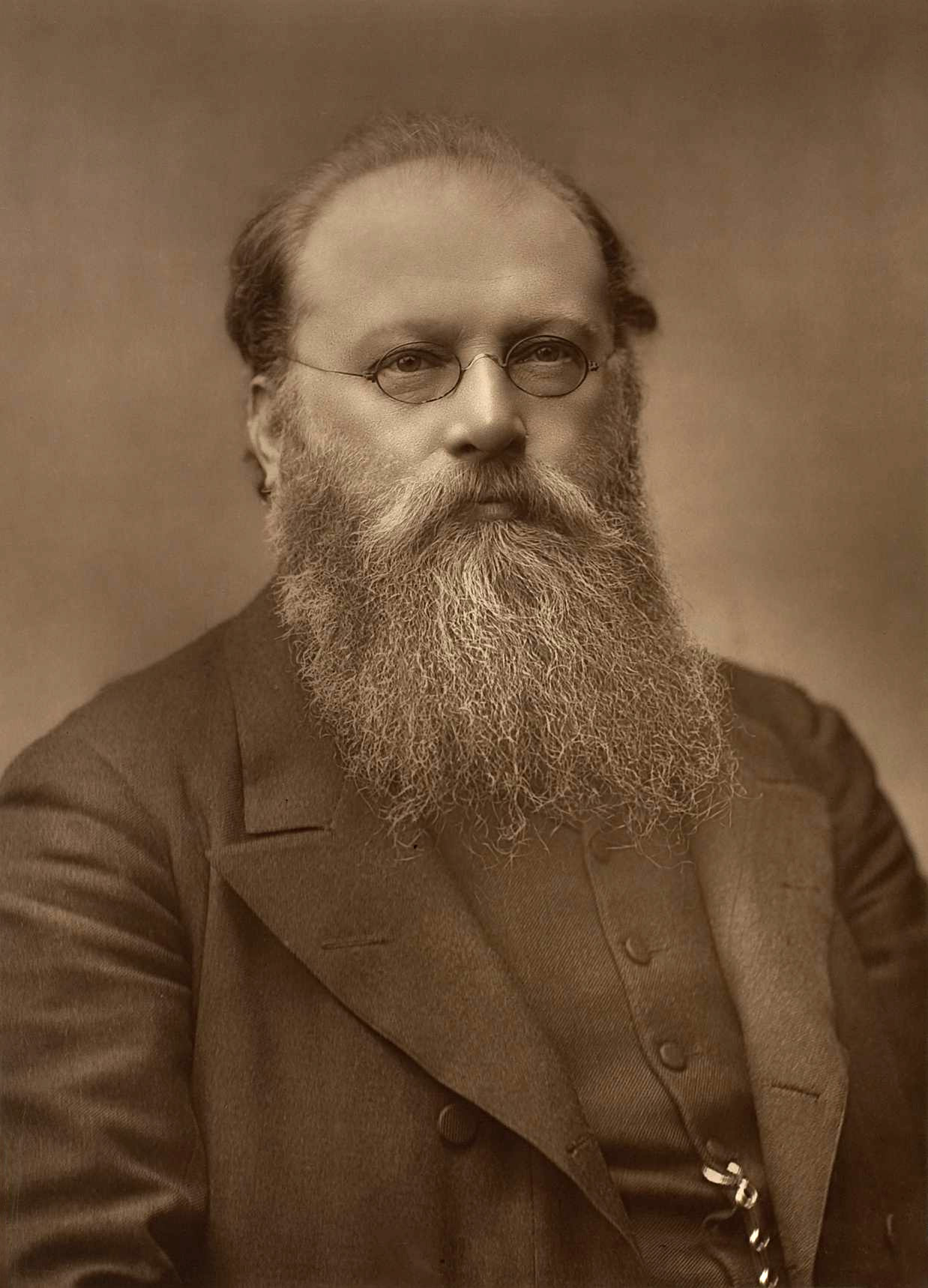
A woodburytype of Richter by Herbert Rose Barraud (c. 1880s)

Johann Baptist Isidor Richter (Hungarian: Richter János Isidor; 4 April 1843 – 5 December 1916) was an Austro-Hungarian orchestral and operatic conductor.

== Biography ==
Richter was born in Raab (Hungarian: Győr), Kingdom of Hungary, Austrian Empire. His father was a local composer, conductor and regens chori Anton Richter. His mother was opera singer Jozefa Csazenszky. He studied at the Vienna Conservatory. He had a particular interest in the horn, and developed his conducting career at several different opera houses in the Austro-Hungarian Empire. He became associated with Richard Wagner in the 1860s, and played the solo trumpet part in the 1870 private première of the Siegfried Idyll. In 1876, he was chosen to conduct the first complete performance of Wagner's Der Ring des Nibelungen at the Bayreuth Festspielhaus.

In 1877, he assisted Wagner as conductor of a series of concerts in London. He subsequently appeared at numerous British choral festivals, served as principal conductor of the Birmingham Triennial Music Festival from 1885 to 1909, and conducted the Hallé Orchestra (1899–1911) from 1899 to 1911 and the London Symphony Orchestra from 1904 to 1911. Richter's work in continental Europe was based chiefly in Vienna, where he conducted works by Johannes Brahms, Anton Bruckner and Antonín Dvořák as well as Richard Wagner. He conducted the London and Vienna premieres of Dvořák's Symphonic Variations and continued to work at Bayreuth.

In his later career, Richter conducted and promoted works by Edward Elgar and Pyotr Ilyich Tchaikovsky. On one occasion, he laid down his baton and allowed a London orchestra to play the whole second movement of Tchaikovsky's Pathétique Symphony itself. In January and February 1909, Richter conducted an English-language production of The Ring at Covent Garden. In 1909 he delivered the British première, shortly after the world première, in Boston, of Ignacy Jan Paderewski's Symphony in B minor "Polonia". Failing eyesight forced his retirement in 1911. He died at Bayreuth in 1916.

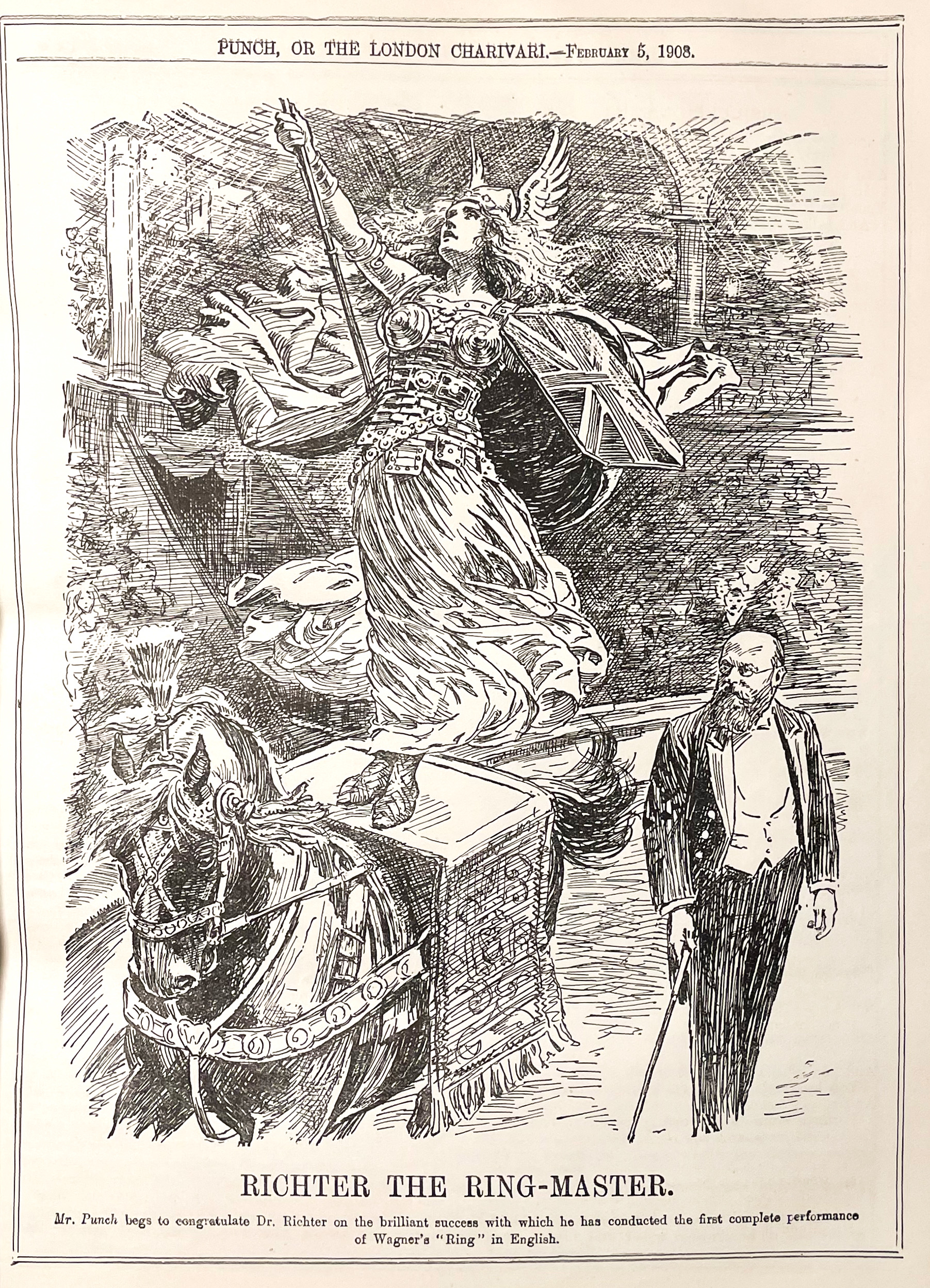
Punch cartoon (5 February 1908) of Richter's first English performance of Richard Wagner's The Ring

Richter's approach to conducting was monumental rather than mercurial or dynamic, emphasising the overall structure of major works in preference to bringing out individual moments of beauty or passion. Assessments of Richter's conducting varied. Eugene Goossens emphasized its rhythmic vitality, while other commentators characterized Richter primarily as a conductor concerned with maintaining tempo.

Hans Richter was first brought to England by Wagner in 1877 to conduct six operatic concerts in London. The impact made by Richter (then 32 years old) on the capital's orchestral players was enormous. They had never been rehearsed so thoroughly, nor with such discipline as that of a genuine musician rather than a showman; nothing was allowed to slip through as the fundamentals were revisited. Intonation was scrutinised, details brought out, tempi rationalised, notes corrected. His practical knowledge (he played every orchestral instrument) proved formidable and no weak player felt secure. He usually conducted rehearsals and performances of orchestral concerts and operas from memory.

The living composers whose works he introduced to British audiences were the greats in whose company he could be found, Wagner, Brahms, Bruckner, Dvorak, Tchaikovsky, Glazunov, Stanford, Parry and Elgar. For 20 years from 1879 he toured the length and breadth of Britain with his Richter Orchestra.

— Christopher Fifield, Hans Richter's impact as a career conductor

A rebuke he is supposed to have made to a musician in the Covent Garden orchestra is still sometimes quoted: "Up with your damned nonsense will I put twice, or perhaps once, but sometimes always, by God, never."

== Notable premières ==
=== Richard Wagner ===
- Siegfried (1876)
- Götterdämmerung (1876)

=== Johannes Brahms ===
- Symphony No. 2 (1877)
- Tragic Overture (1880)
- Piano Concerto No. 2 (1881; soloist: composer)
- Symphony No. 3 (1883)

=== Anton Bruckner ===
- Symphony No. 4 (1881)
- Te Deum (1885)
- Symphony No. 8 (1892)

=== Ernst von Dohnányi ===
- Symphony No. 1 (1901)

=== Edward Elgar ===
- Enigma Variations (1899)
- The Dream of Gerontius (1900)
- Symphony No. 1 (1908)

=== Pyotr Ilyich Tchaikovsky ===
- Violin Concerto (1881; soloist: Adolph Brodsky)
