= Symphony in F (Dohnányi) =

1st symphony by Ernő Dohnányi

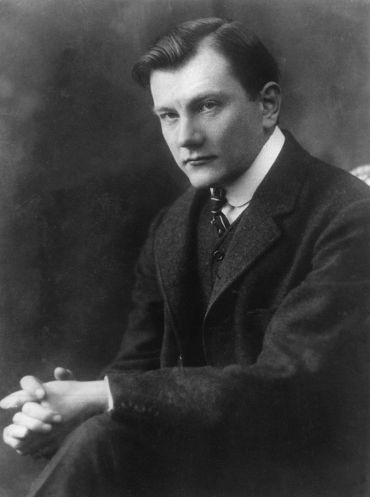
Ernő Dohnányi, c. 1900

Ernő Dohnányi completed his first symphony, unnumbered and entitled Symphony in F, in 1896, while a student of Hans von Koessler. It was never formally published, and although awarded the Hungarian King's Prize, it did not achieve significant critical acclaim. The work, like many of Dohnányi's early compositions, bears the imprint of Johannes Brahms, who had championed the young composer after hearing a performance of Dohnányi's Piano Quintet No. 1. The Symphony in F was given moderate attention after being recorded in 2011. It is approximately thirty minutes in length.

It requires 2 flutes, 2 oboes, 2 clarinets, 2 bassoons, 4 horns, 3 trumpets, 3 trombones, tuba, timpani and strings and while not published in his lifetime, exists in sketches and score at the National Széchényi Library, Budapest. It was premiered 2 June 1897, in Budapest with Gyula Erkel (son of Ferenc) conducting.

== Form ==
Dohnányi wrote the work in the traditional four-movement symphonic format. He marks the score with the following:

1. Allegro
2. Adagio
3. Scherzo – Prestissimo
4. Andante

== Recording ==
In 2011, the symphony's premiere recording (and only recording to date) was conducted by László Kovács.
