= Balint Vazsonyi =

Hungarian-American pianist and political activist

Balint Vázsonyi (7 March 1936 – 17 January 2003) was a Hungarian-born naturalized American pianist, educator, international recitalist/soloist with leading orchestras, and political activist and journalist. He made performance history in playing chronological cycles of all 32 piano sonatas by Beethoven over two days in New York, Boston, and London. During the last six years of his life, he became a commentator in Washington, D.C., on the state of American politics.

== Early life and education ==
From 1945 to 1956, Vazsonyi attended the Franz Liszt Academy of Music from which he earned an Artist Diploma. He made his debut in Budapest at age 12 with the F minor Concerto of J.S. Bach. On 15 December 1956, Vazsonyi fled Budapest on foot for Austria, where he became a pianist in the refugee Philharmonia Hungarica under conductor Antal Doráti. He studied at the Vienna Music Academy with Professor Richard Hauser from 1957 to 1958 and made his Western debut in the Großer Musikvereinssaal, Vienna in January 1958 as soloist with L'Orchestre de la Suisse Romande under conductor Volkmar Andreae. In 1960, upon receiving a scholarship to study with Ernő Dohnányi at the School of Music at Florida State University, Vazsonyi moved to the United States, earning a Master of Music degree. Among the last pupils of the master, Vazsonyi became one of the last links in a tradition that stretched back to Franz Liszt. At FSU, he met another Dohnányi student, Barbara Whittington, whom he married on 26 February 1960.

== Career ==
From 1960 to 1962, Vazsonyi resided in Zürich, Switzerland and in Wiesbaden, Germany, giving concerts and recording in Europe. From 1962 to 1964, he became Pianist-in-Residence at the newly formed Interlochen Arts Academy where his son, Nicholas Vazsonyi, was born in 1963. He became an American citizen in Ann Arbor, Michigan in 1964 and was awarded the Liberty Bell Award the same year. In 1964-78, Vazsonyi moved to London, England with his family for private studies with pianist Dame Myra Hess, from 1964 to her death in 1965. London remained his home base for concertizing in Europe, England, America, and South Africa, recording, and presiding over master classes at Harvard, Yale, Dartmouth, New England Conservatory, Catholic University, Peabody, and the University of Washington.

=== Professorship ===
From 1978 to 1984, Vazsonyi was invited to be Professor of Music at Indiana University, Bloomington School of Music where, as well as having a private piano studio, he conducted all doctoral seminars in Piano Literature. In 1982, while still teaching at Indiana University, Bloomington, Balint Vazsonyi earned a Ph.D in History from the University of Budapest, based in part on his seminal monograph of Ernő Dohnányi, which resulted in a street next to the Franz Liszt Academy of Music in Budapest being named for his mentor as well as an official absolving (2002) of false Nazi-sympathizer charges against Ernő Dohnányi made after World War II. While a professor at Indiana University School of Music, Vazsonyi held a master class in piano performance. In this weekly seminar, performances were offered critical comments from students and from Professor Vazsonyi. No stranger to the political arena, he exposed his piano students to the realities of the international political climate.

=== Telemusic Inc ===
In 1983-92, Vazsonyi, founder/CEO of Telemusic, Inc., wrote/produced, along with video conceptualizer and director Nicholas Vazsonyi, four TV/Home Video/DVD films on the lives of Mozart (scripted by Nicholas Vazsonyi), Beethoven (European portions directed by Cash Baxter), Schubert, and Brahms (see TV/Video titles below). With the English actor Sir Anthony Quayle, he leads the viewer through cities of Europe in search of the life and soul of these composers, using costume drama, music video, and musical selections.

=== Mayoral run ===
In 1991, Bloomington, Indiana's Republican mayoral candidate having stepped down with 100 days (3½ months) remaining, Vazsonyi, based on several articles published in Bloomington's The Herald-Times regarding the First Gulf War, was recruited to run. Although his opponent won, he claimed the experience taught him how the U.S. works full circle.

=== Deanship ===
In 1993, Balint Vazsonyi became dean of music at the New World School of the Arts in Miami, Florida. In 1995, he was appointed senior fellow to the Potomac Foundation in McLean, Virginia and wrote his first political treatise, The Battle for America's Soul. Between 1993 and 1995, he was Honorary Cultural Counselor in America for Hungary (The Republic of Hungary), and a member of the board of directors of the Chopin Foundation of the United States and of the Washington Bach Consort.

== Political philosopher ==
In 1995–2003, he moved to Washington, D.C. as senior fellow of the McLean, Virginia think tank, Potomac Foundation. He then co-founded and became Director of the Center for the American Founding.

Vazsonyi stated: "We advocate and practice discussion of national issues as they relate to America's founding principles. For continued success, we believe this nation needs to return to the Rule of Law, Individual Rights, the Security of Property, and the same American Identity for all its citizens ... As time progressed, the creation of commissar positions in America acquired the dimensions of a growth industry. The avalanche began with affirmative action officers, equal opportunity officers, judicial inquiry officers, and civil rights divisions. These positions exist for the sole purpose of enforcing a political agenda - an occupation at odds with the very nature of America. Certain college and university departments - departments of education, of communications, of journalism, social studies, and urban planning - became the reliable producers of commissars. Law schools, too, began to churn out graduates trained to serve a specific political agenda, rather than jurisprudence ... Soon, entire government departments were created to function as Commissariats, such as the Department of Education, Health and Human Services, the Environmental Protection Agency, the Department of Energy, and the Department of Commerce. Several other federal agencies, such as the National Endowment for the Arts, and its sister outfit, for the Humanities, fall into the same category. All these agencies offer services people find useful and employ many capable professionals along with commissars. But they are of the same cloth, for they provide a platform for commissars, lack constitutional legitimacy, and are virtually immune to citizen complaints. Eventually, commissar types found their way into legislatures, the Supreme Court, and the White House. The recent acquisition of the Department of justice as a commissariat, and the growing multitude of commissar judges on federal benches, complete this massive force whose effectiveness - unlike the armies and submarines of the Third Reich or the ICBMs of the Soviet Union - has proved a match for America's awesome industrial, financial, and spiritual strength."

He published and lectured extensively on cultural and political subjects, appeared in The Wall Street Journal and National Review. He wrote a bi-weekly column for The Washington Times, and wrote a weekly, nationally syndicated column for Scripps Howard. His proposals for the application of America's founding principles to the national debates have been printed in the Congressional Record, The Heritage Foundation, and Representative American Speeches.

Vazsonyi's book, America's 30 Years War: Who is Winning?, defining the source of alien ideas subverting America's culture and society, was published by Regnery in 1998. He was a frequent guest on national talk radio and appeared on television shows such as NBC Today, Booknotes on C-SPAN with Brian Lamb, Washington Journal, MSNBC, and Insights with Robert Novak. In 2000, he toured the nation's capitals to promote a national conversation he called Re-Elect America!. The one-hour television documentary about the tour has been aired on WETA-TV, Washington's PBS station.

== Death ==
Vazsonyi died on 17 January 2003, aged 66, survived by his wife, the couple's son Nicholas and daughter-in-law, Agnes, and several grandchildren. According to obituary in The Washington Times he once played all of Beethoven's 32 piano sonatas in the order they were composed over the course of a single weekend.

== Discography ==
- Liszt: Hungarian Rhapsodies (Vox STPL 512.340/1966)
- "Reverie": Small gems by Great Masters (ALLEGRO AR 88038/1966)
- Schumann: Scenes from Childhood; Arabeske; Symphonic Etudes (PYE Virtuoso, TPLS 13026/1968)
- Brahms: Phantasien, Op.116; Klavierstuecke Op.119; Variations on an original Theme Op.21, No.1 (PYE Virtuoso TPLS 13016/1968)
- Beethoven: Sonata in F Minor, Op.57 ("Appassionata") (PYE Virtuoso TPLS 13042/1969)
- Liszt: Sonata in B Minor (PYE Virtuoso TPLS 13042/1969)
- Brahms: Two Rhapsodies, Op.79; Intermezzi Op.117; Variations and Fugue on a Theme by Handel, Op.24 (PYE Virtuoso GSGC 2048/1969)
- Dohnányi: (First Recording) Piano Concerto No.1 in E Minor, Op.5, New Pharmonia Orchestra/Pritchard (PYE Virtuoso TPLS 13052/1972)
- Jolivet: Concerto for Trumpet and Piano, Maurice Andre/EDO (DGG 1972)
- Chopin: Fantasie F Minor, Op.49; Barcarolle in F Sharp Major, Op.60; Sonata B flat Minor, Op.35 (PYE Virtuoso TPLS 13053/1973)
- Schubert: Moments musicaux; Sonata in G Major, D.894 (PYE Virtuoso - not pressed/1973)
- "Gala Concert": 12 renowned pianists perform at London's Royal Festival Hall (DESMAR DSM 1005/1975)
- "The Hungarians": Dohnányi—Bartok—Kodaly (PANTHEON PFN 1981/1984)

== Videography ==
- "Mozart": A production of Telemusic in association with Hungarian TV and TVOntario VHS:MPI 1700/1989; DVD:Delta Music GmbH, D-50226
- "Beethoven": A production of Telemusic VHS:MPI 1701
- "Schubert": A production of Telemusic in association with Hungarian TV and TVOntario VHS: MPI 1702
- "Brahms": A production of Telemusic in association with Hungarian TV and TVOntario VHS: MPI 1703

== Print publications ==
- "Schumann's Piano Cycles" in "Schumann: The Man and his Music", Barrie & Jenkins. London, 1972 ISBN 0-214-66805-3
- "Bartok and Dohnányi" Editio Musica. Budapest, 1972
- "The 32 Piano Sonatas of Beethoven" Analytical notes for performance of the complete cycle. London, 1977
- "Dohnányi, Erno" in "The New Grove Dictionary of Music & Musicians", Macmillan. London 1981/99 ISBN 1-56159-239-0
- "Bartok and the 21st Century" in "Bartok and Kodaly revisted", Corvina. Budapest, 1985
- "Guidance Notes for Teachers" for Telemusic's VHSs of "Mozart", "Beethoven", "Schubert", "Brahms", Stylus. London,1990
- "Dohnányi, Erno" in "The New Grove Dictionary of Opera", Macmillan. London, 1993 ISBN 1-56159-228-5
- "The Battle for America's Soul" in "The Potomac Papers, 1995 and in "Common Sense" American Enterprise Institute. 1996
- "America on my Mind" - Selected essays, The Potomac Foundation. Washington, 1996
- "Four Points of the Compass: Restoring America's Sense of Direction" in "Representative American Speeches 1996–1997" H.W.Wilson Company. New York, 1997 ISSN 0197-6923
- "America's 30 Years War: Who is Winning?" Regnery. 1998 ISBN 0-89526-354-8
- "The pity of self-pity: The sentimentalism of music" in "Faking It - the sentimentalism of modern society" The Social Affairs Unit. London ISBN 0-907631-75-4
- "America on my Mind" - New selected essays, The Potomac Foundation. Washington, 2004 ISBN 0-615-12753-3

== Quotes from reviews ==
- "Beethoven himself might have played his sonatas much as Mr. Vazsonyi did." The Times, London
- "Chopin's F minor Fantasie was played as Chopin might have played it." Irish Independent, Dublin
- "Vazsonyi has a mind as well as fingers and reminds us that Liszt had too; his interpretation of the Sonata is in a class of its own." The Gramophone, London
- "Vazsonyi plays Brahms with subtlety and understanding, giving the listener the feeling that the pianist gets right inside the composer's mind." Penguin Stereo Record Guide
- "His playing seemed to make the music spring spontaneously to life." The New York Times
- "He played all the bravura passages easily and he made the piano consistently sing." The New York Post
- "He placed his astonishing arts of virtuosity and sound magic in the service of Beethoven." Die Welt, Hamburg
- "He held the listener in an absolutely hypnotic spell." Musical America
- "Among the countless pianists Vazsonyi belongs to the chosen few for whom the piano is a spiritual medium." Die Tat, Zurich
