= Symphony No. 2 (Dohnányi) =

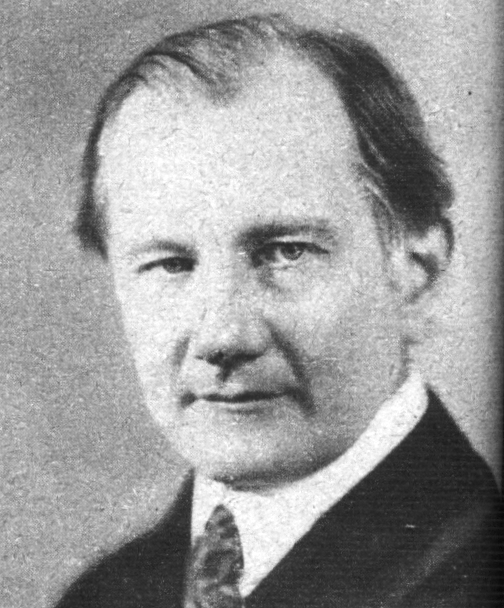
Dohnányi in 1930

The Symphony No. 2 in E, Op. 40, was completed by Ernő Dohnányi (published under professional name Ernst von Dohnányi) in 1944, at the close of the Second World War. It was revised later in the 1950s. Written with audible roots in the Romantic tradition, the work is largely lyrical, yet maintains a controlled militaristic air inspired by the events surrounding its composition. It references a variety of musical backgrounds, including the work of Brahms, Wagner, Kabalevsky, and Bach. Bach's song "Komm, süßer Tod" serves as the basis for a significant portion of the finale.

Dohnányi produced the symphony, a hallmark of his compositional maturity, in a time of great turmoil; its composition coincided with the 1944 German occupation of Hungary, during which thousands of Hungarian Jews – a number of Dohnányi's colleagues among them – were relocated to concentration camps. Dohnányi completed the symphony in Austria, where he had, controversially, moved to in November 1944 following the Soviet assault on Hungarian territory. Although these events circulated the symphony's creation, the work itself does not ostensibly depict the turbulent circumstances of the war's final days, but only suggests their presence with an uneasy atmosphere. It is approximately fifty minutes in length, and is the composer's last symphony.

== Premiere ==
The revised version of the work, completed in 1956, received its premiere performance on March 15, 1957, with the Minneapolis Symphony under the direction of Antal Dorati at Northrop Auditorium on the campus of the University of Minnesota in Minneapolis. The composer came to Minneapolis a week earlier to attend rehearsals and the premiere; he also gave an all-Beethoven solo piano recital at the Minneapolis Institute of Art on March 12, 1957.

== Form ==
The work is in the traditional four-movement symphony format.

=== I. Allegro con brio, ma energico e appassionato ===
The first movement, approximately 14 minutes long, begins with a distinctive main theme that recurs in various manifestations. This theme is developed for about one minute and sets a heavy, uncertain air. After the introductory material concludes, the second, more lyrical theme is presented by violas and expanded by the woodwinds, displaying Dohnányi's talent for rich harmony and engaging orchestration. Although a generally quiet section, it is periodically accented with louder strings; the last accent does not fade and grows in expectation of a passionate high point, but is violently and abruptly interrupted by a burst from the brass and a subsequent use of snares. Immediately after the interruption, the basses interject a muscular passage before snares resume with a similar episode. The music quiets and returns to a lyrical sequence.

After several minutes of gradual growth, the movement reaches its climax, a complete recapitulation of the opening theme and its developing material, executed by the brass with a shimmering undercurrent of violins, and punctuated by timpani. After a short respite, Dohnányi makes two more brief reiterations of the introductory theme, and then proceeds to the final bars, a massive ending. After vacillating wildly between tragedy and triumph for the duration of the movement, Dohnányi concludes strongly in the tonic major.

=== II. Adagio pastorale, molto con sentimento ===
The second movement differs drastically from the first, bearing little resemblance to the shifting, stifled martial atmosphere of the opening movement. It begins with a pseudo-Romantic theme from the woodwinds, the flutes and oboes playing prominent parts. They are later joined by the strings in a sweeping entrance hinting at the style of Dvořák, which play fluidly into a cheerful, but not light, development. This passage quiets and the main theme is recapitulated with the flutes, after which a solo clarinet scales playfully, with the support of soft strings and horn.

This segways into a simple, eerie rhythm set by the harp, playing nine consecutive whole notes with a rich harmony of woodwinds above. After several repetitions of the opening material, the movement climaxes with Romantic intensity, the pulsing strings complemented by confident trumpets and timpani. There is an extended decline, which then merges into the concluding passages. The second movement ends tenderly, with quiet nostalgia. It is around twelve minutes in duration.

=== III. Scherzo – Burla: Allegro ===
The scherzo, perhaps the symphony's most modern movement, does not remind the listener of the work's first half. Only five minutes, it is intended to be grotesque and possibly unsettling. It begins turbulently with a rapid, discordant succession of chords, a progression which would constitute the basis of the movement, above a menacing string undertone. Amid this a shrill flute introduces the barely distinguishable second theme of the movement. Afterward the strings commence a momentary moment of fluidity before they are interrupted by a wailing trombone which gives the impression of a Russian circus. A march rhythm accompanies this action, trumpets buzzing almost disconcertedly.

The flutes return with the second theme, before the trombones recapitulate the opening material, creating an almost competitive environment in which various sections of the orchestra struggle for supremacy. In a brief return to lyricism, the strings play a shiny passage with some playful woodwinds beneath. Unpredictably this is extinguished by a squawking trill of the brass, immediately refocusing the movement to the rapid material from the introduction, the chords returning as strong accents. After about 30 seconds of assorted events, the distinctive swoon of the trombones heard once before returns with more violent intensity, overshadowing the rest of the instruments, and drives the movement to a humorous and ungraceful conclusion. In a full tutti, the scherzo's end is abrupt, led to with a brief buildup and accomplished with a final, unrelenting chord.

=== IV. Variazione ===
There is no overarching indication of tempo or mood in this movement, but rather a sequence of changing markings. After a short introduction, the movement presents five consecutive variations of a theme by Bach as the centerpiece of the finale. The variations are followed by a short fugue on the same theme and a concluding coda. The markings are as follows: Introduzione: Andante – Tema: Adagio – Variazione I: Piu mosso (Andante) – Variazione II: Piu mosso, animato, risoluto – Variazione III: Meno mosso (quasi il tempo del tema) – Variazione IV: Piu mosso, tempestuoso (Circa doppio movimento) – Variazione V: Adagio (mezzo movimento) – Fuga: Adagio ma non troppo – Coda: Andante maestoso – Alla marcia. This movement is the symphony's longest, spanning 20 minutes.

The finale is briefly introduced with a sullen, tuba-based opening, which quickly transitions into a vibrant, concerto-style duet violin passage, the first of the five variations. The bulk of the movement consists of the remaining four, executed by a combination of solo and orchestral work, and spread over a variety of musical forays. These passages, although highly diverse in their style and orchestration, all derive their core material from the primary choral melody of Bach's song "Komm, süßer Tod". Although Bach scored the song's main theme for solo voice, Dohnányi did not include a choral setting of the work, and maintains a purely instrumental interpretation.

After the fifth variation, Dohnányi proceeds with a six-minute fugue based on the same material; the fugue leads the movement to its climax, building from gentle strings and steadily involving more of the orchestra. In the midst of the climax Bach's melody is united with the symphony's opening theme, presented by the trumpets and supported by the trombones, horns and tuba. This new energy drives the movement to the coda, which closes the symphony. Unlike the unsure victory of the first movement, the finale has no reservations about triumph and presents a robust march to conclude the piece, a definitive E major finish.

== Instrumentation ==
The score commands the following orchestra:

Woodwinds
Piccolo
3 Flutes
2 Oboes
English horn
2 Clarinets in B♭
Bass clarinet
3 Bassoons
Contrabassoon

Brass
8 Horns
4 Trumpets
3 Trombones
Tuba

Percussion
Timpani
Bass Drum
Cymbals
Snare Drum
Tam-Tam
Triangle
Tambourine
Rattle (Ratchet)

Strings
16 1st Violins
10 2nd Violins
8 Violas
8 Cellos
4 Double basses
2 Harps

== Influence ==
Throughout this work, Dohnányi retains the Romantic sentiment manifested in the work of Brahms, who had championed Dohnányi when the latter was an aspiring composer at the end of the 19th century. Dohnányi's orchestration holds numerous similarities to that of Brahms; in particular, the use of woodwinds in the Second Symphony takes influence from Brahms' work in the same area. The presence of Wagner is also notable, e.g. Dohnányi's use of brass in the opening and concluding movements, hinting at Parsifal and other of Wagner's later work.

Nevertheless, the composer's style does not hide the contemporary traditions of modernism. Although he breaks from the experimental efforts of Bartók, Dohnányi keeps to his Hungarian origins, with traces of Hungarian folk music present within the lines of the symphony. In addition to the German influence, there are also subtle ties to the work of Russian composers. The softer second movement as well as sardonic third movement hold traces of Soviet music, possibly referencing thematic material of Kabalevsky. Amid these influences, Dohnányi creates a distinct musical idiom that characterizes most of his mature compositions.

In the 1950s, while the composer was serving his tenure as composer-in-residence at Florida State University, Dohnányi decided to revise the Second Symphony in a period of intense creativity at the end of his life. Although Dohnányi made significant alterations to the work, it pointedly retains its Romantic character. Throughout the entirety of his adult career, Dohnányi remained musically conservative, and even in his final years did not seek to foray into tonal and stylistic novelties. It is the revised version which is most often played in concert halls today.

== Recordings ==
Although the symphony has been performed many times under numerous conductors, recordings of it have been scarce. By far the most well-known recording (and until 2010 the only commercially released one), completed 21–22 September 1995, is done by the BBC Philharmonic, conducted by Matthias Bamert and produced by Ralph Couzens. Released by Chandos Records, this also happens to be the symphony's premiere recording. Its information is as follows:

- 1996: Matthias Bamert (with the BBC Philharmonic Orchestra), recorded 1995, released 1996 on Dohnányi: Symphony No. 2, Symphonic Minutes (Chandos Records Ltd.) as "Dohnányi: Symphony No. 2" (49:49).

A second recording, performed by the American Symphony Orchestra under Leon Botstein, was completed in 2010:

- 2010: Leon Botstein (with the American Symphony Orchestra), recorded 2010, released 2010 on Dohnányi: Symphony No. 2 in E Major, Op. 40 (Live Recording) as "Dohnányi: Symphony No. 2" (53:58).

It is notable that on the BBC recording, the segmented finale is presented as nine consecutive tracks (t. 9–17), with an individual track representing each significant change in Dohnányi's markings. In Botstein's recording, the fourth movement and all of its components are listed under one longer track. In both concert and recording performance, it is to the conductor's discretion as to how to organize the listings in the final movement.

A third recording was undertaken by the Florida State University's University Symphony Orchestra conducted by Alexander Jiménez in the spring of 2013 on Naxos Records; it was released in June 2014.

== See also ==
- Soviet music
- List of songs and arias of Johann Sebastian Bach
