= Serenade (Dohnányi) =

Musical composition by Ernő Dohnányi

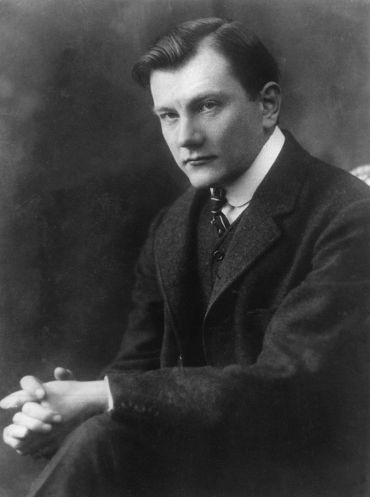
Ernő Dohnányi, c. 1900

The Serenade in C major, Op. 10, for string trio (the conventional combination of violin, viola, and cello) (1902), is an early 20th-century five-movement suite by Hungarian composer Ernő Dohnányi. Premiered in Vienna in 1904, the year of its first publication, it was written in 1902 during a concert tour to London and Vienna.

== Structure ==
The serenade comprises five movements:

1. Marcia: Allegro
2. Romanza: Adagio non troppo
3. Scherzo: Vivace
4. Tema con variazioni: Andante con moto
5. Rondo (Finale): Allegro vivace
