= Serenade for Violin, Viola and Cello (Beethoven) =

Composition for string trio by Ludwig van Beethoven

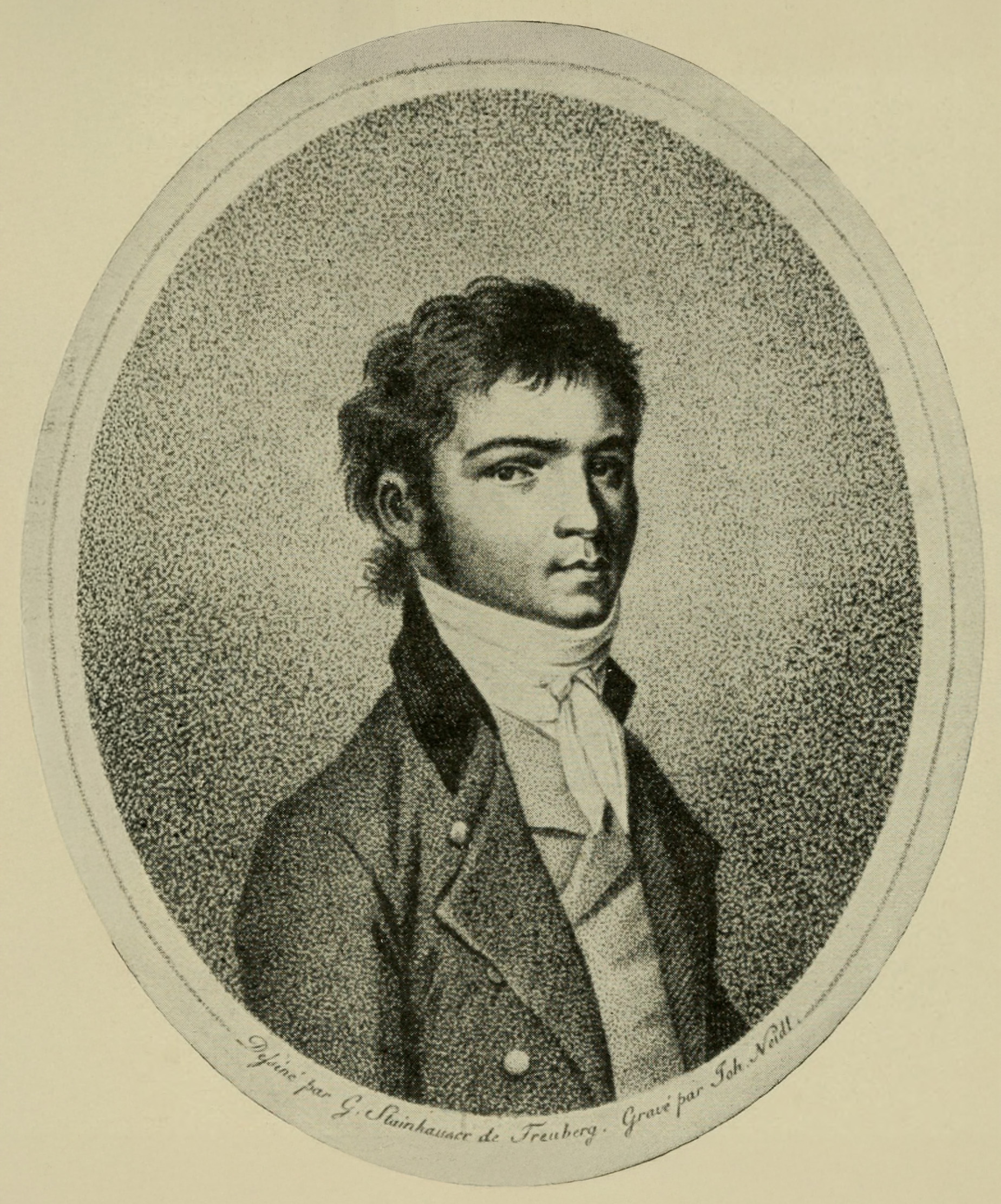
Ludwig van Beethoven, c. 1796

The Serenade in D major for Violin, Viola and Cello (String Trio No. 2), Op. 8, is a string trio composition by Ludwig van Beethoven. It was written from 1796–97, and published in 1797 by Artaria in Vienna.

== Structure ==
The composition is in six movements

1. Marcia: Allegro (4/4) – Adagio (3/4)
2. Menuetto: Allegretto (3/4)
3. Adagio – Scherzo: Allegro molto – Adagio – Allegro molto – Adagio, in D minor (2/4)
4. Allegretto alla polacca, in F major (3/4)
5. Andante quasi allegretto (2/4) – Variations 1, 2, 3, 4 (2/4) – Allegro (6/8) – Tempo I (2/4)
6. Marcia: Allegro (4/4)

A typical performance takes around 26–30 minutes.

== Transcriptions ==
In 1803, Franz Xaver Kleinheinz arranged this piece for viola and piano. It was published in 1804 as the Notturno for Viola and Piano in D major, Op. 42. In September 1803 Beethoven wrote to his publisher: "I have gone through [the arrangements] and made drastic corrections in some passages. So do not dare to state in writing that I have arranged them [...] If you do, you will be telling a lie, seeing that, moreover, I could never have found the time, or even had the patience, to do work of that kind." Nonetheless, Beethoven was incorrectly credited as the author of the arrangement. In addition to straightforward correction of the transcription, Beethoven permitted himself an odd extra bar and occasional new imitative counterpoint.

In his book Classic Music: Expression, Form, and Style, Leonard G. Ratner cites the fourth movement as a representative example of the polonaise.
