= Ernst von Dohnányi =

Hungarian composer and pianist (1877–1960)

Ernst von Dohnányi Dohnányi Ernő
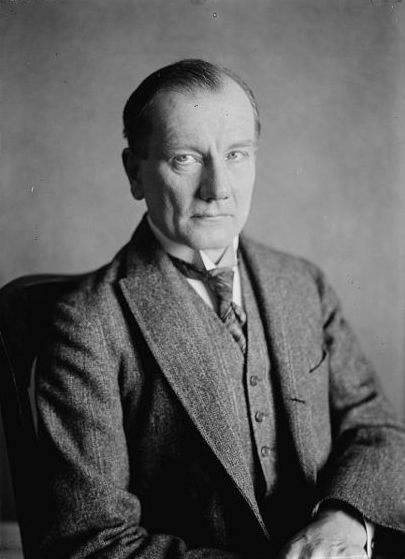
- Dohnányi in the 1920s
- Born: 27 July 1877; Pozsony, Austria-Hungary
- Died: 9 February 1960 (aged 82); New York City, United States
- Education: Royal Hungarian Academy of Music
- Occupations: Composer; pianist; academic teacher
- Organizations: Franz Liszt Academy of Music; Florida State University
- Family: Dohnányi family

Ernst von Dohnányi (Hungarian: Dohnányi Ernő, [ˈdohnaːɲi ˈɛrnøː]; 27 July 1877 – 9 February 1960) was a Hungarian composer, pianist and conductor. He used the German form of his name on most published compositions.

== Biography ==
Dohnányi was born in Pozsony, Kingdom of Hungary (today part of Bratislava, Slovakia). Born into the old noble Dohnányi family, he was the son of Friedrich Dohnányi and his wife, Ottilia Szlabey. He first studied music with his father, a professor of mathematics and amateur cellist, and when he was eight years old, with Carl Forstner, organist at the local cathedral. In 1894 he moved to Budapest and enrolled in the Royal National Hungarian Academy of Music, studying piano with István Thomán and composition with Hans von Koessler, a cousin of Max Reger. (Note: Over the years it was called also the College of Music (1919–1925) and from 1925 the Ferenc Liszt Academy of Music, its current name.) Thomán had been a favorite student of Franz Liszt, while von Koessler was a devotee of Johannes Brahms's music. These two influences played an important part in Dohnányi's life: Liszt for his piano playing and Brahms for his music. Dohnányi's first published work, his Piano Quintet in C minor, earned the approval of Brahms, who promoted it in Vienna. Dohnányi did not study long at the Academy of Music: in June 1897 he sought to take the final exams without completing his studies. Permission was granted, and a few days later he passed with high marks, as composer and pianist, graduating at less than 20 years of age.

After a few lessons with Eugen d'Albert, another student of Liszt, Dohnányi made his debut in Berlin in 1897 and was recognized at once as a performer of high merit. Similar success followed in Vienna and on a subsequent tour of Europe, frequently collaborating with conductor Hans Richter. He made his London debut at a Richter concert in Queen's Hall, with a notable performance of Beethoven's Piano Concerto No. 4. Dohnányi was among the first to conduct and popularize Bartók's more accessible music.

During the 1898 season, Dohnányi visited the United States, where he gained a reputation playing Beethoven's Piano Concerto No. 4 for his American debut with the St. Louis Symphony. Unlike most famous pianists of the time, he did not limit himself to solo recitals and concertos, but also appeared in chamber music. In 1901 he completed his Symphony No. 1, his first orchestral work. Although he was heavily influenced by established contemporaries, notably Brahms, it displayed considerable technical skill in its own right.

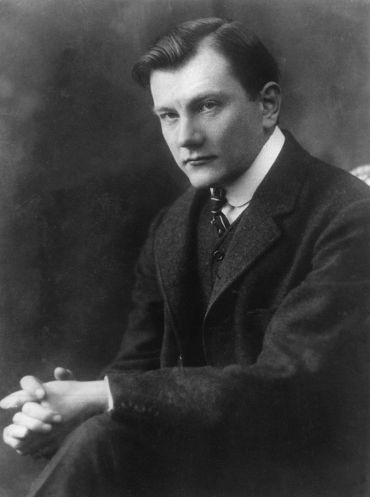
Dohnányi, c. 1900

Dohnányi married Elisabeth "Elsa" Kunwald (also a pianist), and they had a son, Hans, in 1902. Hans subsequently had two sons: the German politician Klaus von Dohnányi and the conductor Christoph von Dohnányi, longtime music director of the Cleveland Orchestra. Hans distinguished himself as a leader of the anti-Nazi resistance in Germany and was executed in the final stages of World War II. Dohnányi and Elsa Kunwald also had a daughter, Greta.

On an invitation from the violinist Joseph Joachim, a close friend of Brahms, Dohnányi taught at the Hochschule in Berlin from 1905 to 1915. There he wrote The Veil of Pierrette, Op. 18, and the Suite in F-sharp minor, Op. 19. Returning to Budapest, he appeared in remarkably many performances over the following decade, notably in the Beethoven sesquicentennial year of 1920/1921.

Before World War I broke out, Dohnányi met and fell in love with a German actress (also described as a singer), Elsa Galafrés, who was married to the Polish Jewish violinist Bronisław Huberman. They could not yet marry as their spouses refused to divorce them, but nonetheless, Dohnányi and Elsa Galafrés had a son, Matthew, in January 1917. Both later gained the divorces they sought and were married in June 1919. Dohnányi also adopted Johannes, Elsa's son by Huberman.

During the short-lived Hungarian Soviet Republic of 1919, Dohnányi was appointed Director of the Budapest Academy, but a few months later the new interim government replaced him with the prominent violinist Jenő Hubay after Dohnányi had refused to dismiss the pedagogue and composer Zoltán Kodály from the academy for his supposedly leftist political views. However, in 1920, after Admiral Horthy became Regent of Hungary, Dohnányi was named music director of the Budapest Philharmonic Orchestra and as such promoted the music of Béla Bartók, Zoltán Kodály, Leo Weiner, and other contemporary Hungarian composers. That same 1920 season, he performed Beethoven's complete piano works and recorded several of them on the Ampico player-piano-roll apparatus. He gained renown as a teacher. His pupils included Andor Földes, Mischa Levitzki, Ervin Nyiregyházi, Géza Anda, Annie Fischer, Vera Nicolaevna Preobrajenska, Hope Squire, Helen Camille Stanley, Bertha Tideman-Wijers, Edward Kilenyi, Bálint Vázsonyi, Sir Georg Solti, Istvan Kantor, Georges Cziffra, and Ľudovít Rajter (conductor and Dohnányi's godson). In 1933 he organized the first International Franz Liszt Piano Competition.

In 1934 Dohnányi was once again appointed Director of the Budapest Academy of Music.

In 1937 Dohnányi met Ilona Zachár, who was married and had two children. By this time, he had separated from Elsa Galafrés. He and Ilona traveled throughout Europe as husband and wife, but were not legally married until they settled in the United States. After Dohnányi's death, Ilona, in her biography, launched a campaign to quell his reputation as a Nazi sympathizer. Peter Halász continued this in an article titled "Persecuted Musicians in Hungary between 1919–1945", which portrayed him as a "victim" of Nazism, and by James Grymes, who in his book Dohnányi saw him as "a forgotten hero of the Holocaust resistance".

Dohnányi remained director of the Budapest Academy of Music until 1943. According to the 2015 entry on Dohnányi in the New Grove Dictionary of Music and Musicians, "From 1939 much of [Dohnányi's] time was devoted to the fight against growing Nazi influences." By 1941 he had resigned his directorial post rather than submit to the anti-Jewish legislation. In his orchestra, the Budapest Philharmonic, (Note: Budapest Symphony Orchestra, or as it is known in Hungary, the Hungarian Radio Symphony Orchestra.) he kept on all Jewish members until two months after the German invasion of Hungary in March 1944, when he disbanded the ensemble. In November 1944 he moved to Austria, a decision that drew criticism for many years. Musicologist James A. Grymes has defended Dohnányi's actions during the war, crediting his solidarity with Jewish colleagues and his actions to help some escape from Nazi-occupied countries.

From 1949, Dohnányi taught for ten years at the Florida State University School of Music in Tallahassee. He became an honorary member of the Epsilon Iota chapter of Phi Mu Alpha Sinfonia fraternity there. He and his wife Ilona became U.S. citizens in 1955.

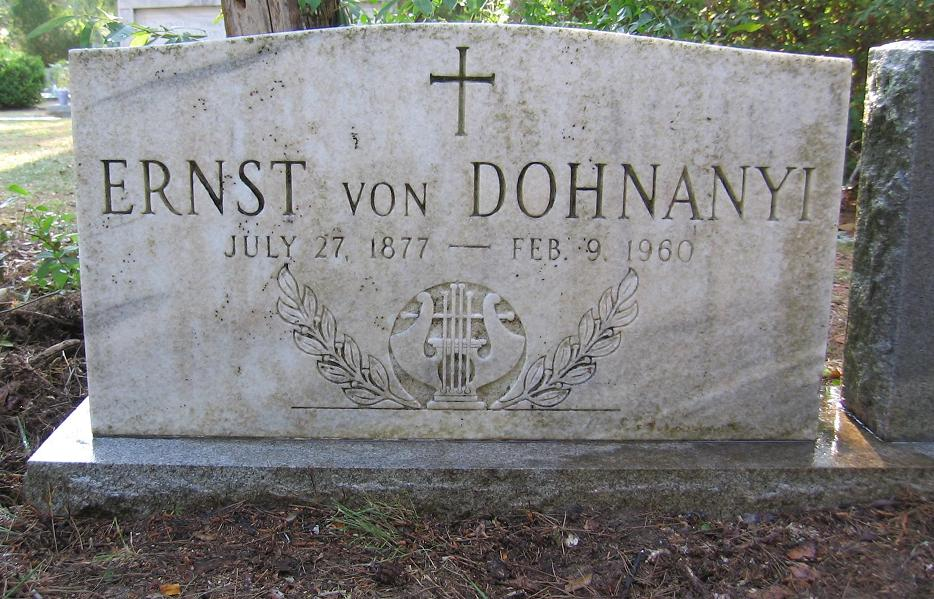
Dohnányi's gravesite at Roselawn Cemetery, Tallahassee, Florida

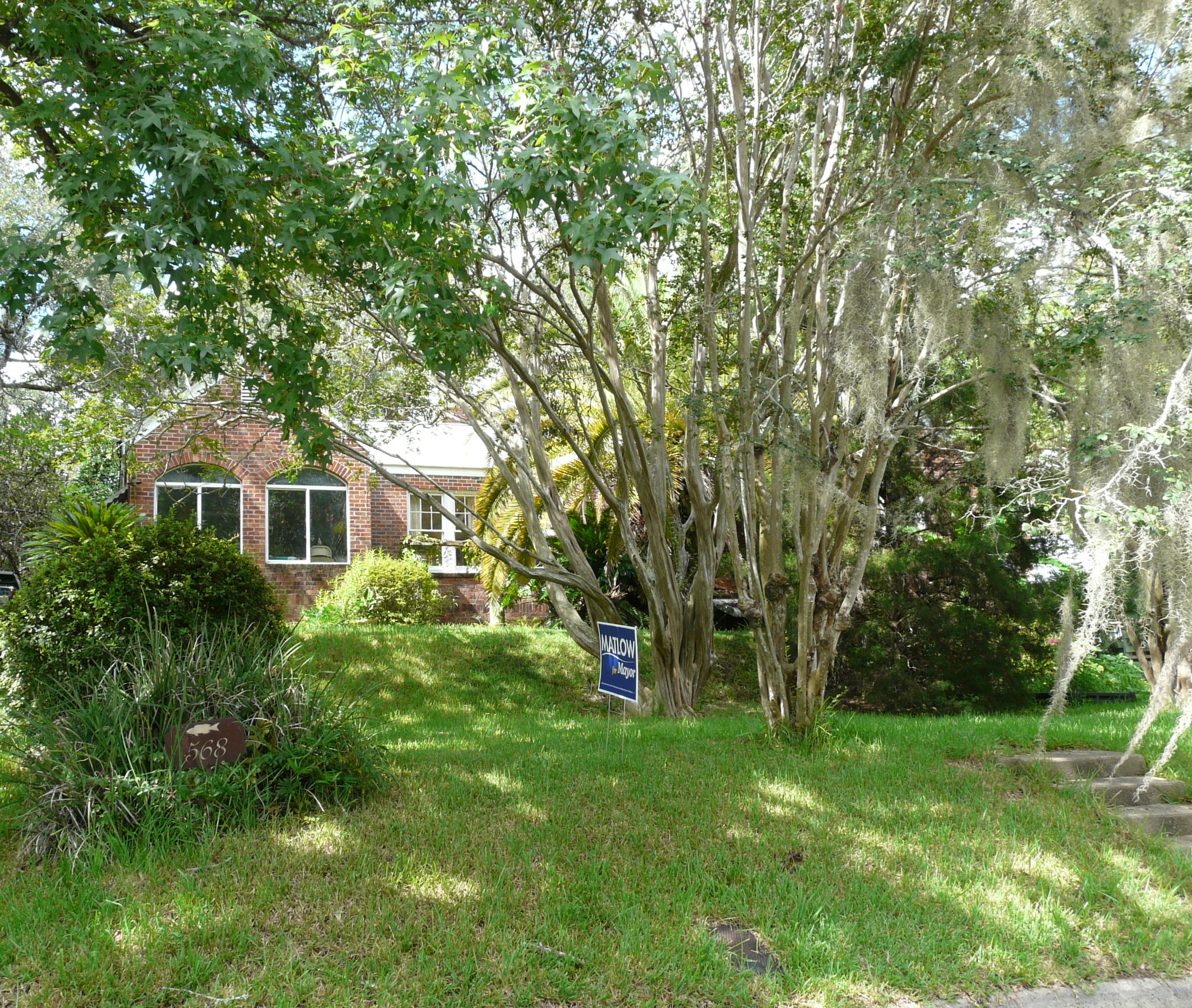
Dohnányi's home in Tallahassee, Florida

In the U.S., Dohnányi continued to compose and became interested in American folk music. His last orchestral work (except for a 1957 revision of the Symphony No. 2) was American Rhapsody (1953), written for the sesquicentennial of Ohio University and including folk material, for example, "Turkey in the Straw", "On Top of Old Smokey", and "I am a poor wayfaring stranger".

His last public performance, on January 30, 1960, was at Florida State University, conducting the university orchestra in Beethoven's Piano Concerto No. 4, with his doctoral student Edward R. Thaden as soloist. After the performance, Dohnányi traveled to New York City to record some Beethoven piano sonatas and shorter piano pieces for Everest Records. He had previously recorded a Mozart concerto in the early 1930s in Hungary (No. 17, in G major, K. 453, playing and conducting the Budapest Philharmonic), and also his own Variations on a Nursery Tune, the second movement of his Ruralia hungarica (Gypsy Andante), and a few solo works on 78 rpm. He had also recorded various other works, including Beethoven's Tempest Sonata and Haydn's F minor Variations, on early mono LPs.

Dohnányi died of pneumonia on 9 February 1960, in New York City, ten days after his final performance, and was buried in Tallahassee, Florida.

== Influence and legacy ==
- The BBC issued an LP recording taken from one of his last concerts, heard in 1959 at Florida State University, in which he played Beethoven's piano sonata Op. 31 No. 1 and Schubert's piano sonata D. 894. The Testament label has reissued the recital on CD in a set that also includes three of the pianist's own short pieces that he played there as encores, a short recital of his works that he played at the 1956 Edinburgh Festival, and a few that were broadcast on the BBC in 1936.
- Dohnányi's three volumes of Daily Finger Exercises for the Advanced Pianist were published by Mills Music in 1962.
- The Warren D. Allen Music Library at Florida State University's College of Music holds a large archive of Dohnányi's papers, manuscripts and related materials.
- The Hungarian government posthumously awarded him its highest civilian honor, the Kossuth Prize, in 1990.
- An International Ernst von Dohnányi Festival was held at Florida State University in 2002. The LSU professor Milton Hallman was a student of his and in 1987 recorded a CD called Works For Piano containing some of Dohnányi's most notable music.

== Compositions ==
Dohnányi's composing style was personal, but very conservative. His music largely subscribes to the Romantic idiom. Although he used elements of Hungarian folk music, he is not seen to draw on folk traditions in the way that Bartók or Kodály do. Some characterize his style as traditional mainstream Euro-Germanic in the Brahmsian manner (structurally more than in the way the music actually sounds) rather than specifically Hungarian, while others hear very little of Brahms in his music. The very best of his works may be his Serenade in C major for string trio, Op. 10 (1902) and Variations on a Nursery Tune for piano and orchestra, Op. 25 (1914). His Second symphony is a major work, which he composed during the Second World War. It is uncharacteristically sombre, notably in the grotesque, dissonant third movement.

=== Stage ===
- Der Schleier der Pierrette (The Veil of Pierrette), Mime in three parts (Libretto after Arthur Schnitzler), Op. 18 (1909)
- Tante Simona (Aunt Simona), Comic Opera in one act (Libretto by Victor Heindl), Op. 20 (1912)
- A vajda tornya (The Tower of the Voivod), Romantic Opera in three acts (Libretto by Viktor Lányi, after Hans Heinz Ewers and Marc Henry), Op. 30 (1922)
- A tenor (The Tenor), Comic Opera in three acts (Libretto by Ernő Góth and Carl Sternheim, after Bürger Schippel by Carl Sternheim), Op. 34 (1927)

=== Choral ===
- Szegedi mise (Szeged Mass, also Missa in Dedicatione Ecclesiae), Op. 35 (1930)
- Cantus vitae, Symphonic Cantata, Op. 38 (1941)
- Stabat mater, Op. 46 (1953)

=== Orchestral ===
- Symphony in F major (1896, unpublished) - Hungarian King's Prize in 1897
- Symphony No. 1 in D minor, Op. 9 (1901)
- Suite in F-sharp minor, Op. 19 (1909)
- Ünnepi nyitány (Festival Overture), Op. 31 (1923)
- Ruralia hungarica (based on Hungarian folk tunes), Op. 32b (1924)
- Szimfonikus percek (Symphonic Minutes), Op. 36 (1933)
- Symphony No. 2 in E major, Op. 40 (1945, revised 1954–7)
- American Rhapsody, Op. 47 (1953)

=== Solo instrument and orchestra ===
- Piano Concerto No. 1 in E minor, Op. 5 (1898) (the opening theme was inspired by Brahms's Symphony No. 1)
- Konzertstück (Concertpiece) in D major for cello and orchestra, Op. 12 (1904)
- Variations on a Nursery Tune (Variationen über ein Kinderlied) for piano and orchestra, Op. 25 (1914)
- Violin Concerto No. 1 in D minor, Op. 27 (1915)
- Piano Concerto No. 2 in B minor, Op. 42 (1947)
- Violin Concerto No. 2 in C minor, Op. 43 (1950)
- Concertino for harp and chamber orchestra, Op. 45 (1952)

=== Chamber and instrumental ===
- String Quartet in D minor, 1893 (unpublished, manuscript at British Library) (Grymes, Ernst von Dohnányi: A Bio-bibliography, p. 32)
- String Sextet in B♭ major, 1893 (revised 1896, revised and premiered 1898. Recorded on Hungaroton, 2006.) (Grymes, p. 32)
- Minuet for String Quartet, 1894 (Grymes, p. 32. Manuscript at the National Széchényi Library)
- Piano Quartet in F♯ minor, (1894)
- Piano Quintet No. 1 in C minor, Op. 1 (1895)
- String Quartet No. 1 in A major, Op. 7 (1899)
- Sonata in B♭ minor for cello and piano, Op. 8 (1899)
- Serenade in C major for string trio, Op. 10 (1902)
- String Quartet No. 2 in D♭ major, Op. 15 (1906)
- Sonata in C♯ minor for violin and piano, Op. 21 (1912)
- Piano Quintet No. 2 in E♭ minor, Op. 26 (1914)
- String Quartet No. 3 in A minor, Op. 33 (1926)
- Sextet in C major for piano, strings and winds, Op. 37 (1935)
- Aria for flute and piano, Op 48, No. 1 (1958)
- Passacaglia for solo flute, Op. 48, No. 2 (1959)

=== Piano ===
- Four Pieces, Op. 2 (1897, pub. 1905)
- Waltzes in F♯ minor for four hands, Op. 3 (1897)
- Variations and Fugue on a Theme of E[mma].G[ruber]., Op. 4 (1897)
- Gavotte and Musette (WoO, 1898)
- Albumblatt (WoO, 1899)
- Passacaglia in E♭ minor, Op. 6 (1899)
- Four Rhapsodies, Op. 11 (1903)
- Winterreigen, Op. 13 (1905)
- Humoresque in the form of a Suite, Op. 17 (1907)
- Three Pieces, Op. 23 (1912)
- Fugue in D minor for left hand (WoO, 1913)
- Suite in A minor "Suite in the Old Style", Op. 24 (1913)
- Six Concert Etudes, Op. 28 (1916)
- Variations on a Hungarian Folksong, Op. 29 (1917)
- Pastorale on a Hungarian Christmas Song (WoO, 1920)
- Valses nobles, concert arrangement for piano (after Schubert, D. 969) (WoO, 1920)
- Ruralia hungarica, Op. 32a (1923)
- Waltz for Piano from Delibes' "Coppelia" (WoO, 1925)
- Six Pieces, Op. 41 (1945)
- Waltz Suite, for two pianos, Op. 39a (1945),
- Limping Waltz for solo piano, Op. 39b (1947)
- Three Singular Pieces, Op. 44 (1951)
- Twelve Short Studies for the Advanced Pianist (1951)

Cultural offices
Preceded by István Kerner	Chief Conductor, Budapest Philharmonic Orchestra; 1919–1944	Succeeded by János Ferencsik
