= Arthur Eyton-Jones =

Arthur Eyton-Jones may refer to:

- John Eyton-Jones (1862–1940), Welsh international footballer
- David Eyton-Jones (1923–2012), British Special Air Service soldier during World War II
