= Battle of Port Said =

1956 decisive battle during the Suez Crisis

- Part of Operation Musketeer and the Suez Crisis
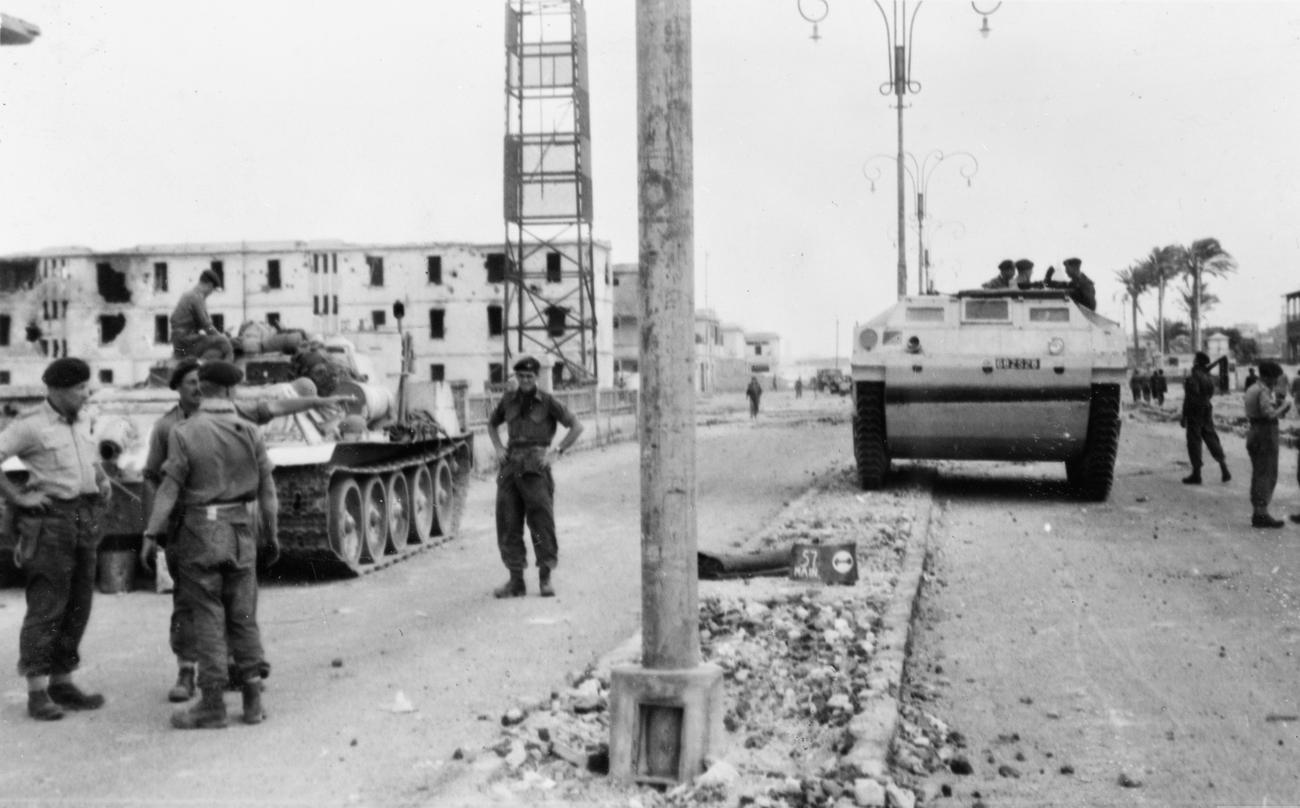
- British troops and tanks in Port Said, Egypt
Date	5 November – 22 December 1956 (Note: The main battle ended on 22 December 1956; However, Israeli troops did not withdraw until March of 1957.) (1 month, 2 weeks and 3 days)
Location	Port Said, Egypt 31°15′45″N 32°18′22″E
Result	Egyptian victory

Belligerents
United Kingdom; France; United Nations	Israel	Egypt

Commanders and leaders
(United Kingdom) Hugh Stockwell (France) Andre Beaufre	None (at Port Said)	Salaheddin Moguy

Units involved
Royal Air Force; 2nd Parachute Regiment; 3rd Parachute Regiment	Israeli Air Force; Israeli Navy	Egyptian Navy; Egyptian Air Force

Strength
80,000 men 21,000 military vehicles 500 combat aircraft 130 warships	395 paratroopers Many aircraft Ground forces	100,000 men >158 aircraft

The Battle of Port Said took place during the Suez Crisis. The goal of the battle was to allow the United Kingdom to seize control of the Suez Canal, a significantly important trade and transportation route that goes through the nation of Egypt.

== Prelude to the battle ==
In 1922, four years after the end of the First World War, Egypt formally received independence from the United Kingdom. However, even though Egypt gained its independence, it could still be considered de jure occupied by Britain, as many British troops were still stationed in Egypt, while Britain retained heavy influence over Egypt. Until 1956, the Suez Canal was controlled by the Suez Canal Company, owned by France with Egyptian participation. Tensions first arose when Britain and the United States made a decision to not finance the Egyptian construction of the Aswan High Dam in response to Egypt’s growing relations with the communist state of Czechoslovakia and the Soviet Union. In 1956, the current president of Egypt at the time, Gamal Abdel Nasser, attempted to nationalize the Suez Canal, meaning that he wished for Egypt as a nation to regain control of the canal. Nasser declared martial law in Egypt, and quickly seized control of the canal.

=== Israeli Invasion ===
On 29 October 1956, one week before the British and French invasion, 10 Israeli brigades invaded Egypt and advanced toward the Suez Canal. The Israeli military was able to defeat Egyptian forces in multiple battles.

== The battle ==
Britain and France, following their plan, demanded that Israeli and Egyptian troops withdraw from the canal, and they announced that they would intervene to enforce a cease-fire ordered by the United Nations. On 5 and 6 November, British and French forces landed at Port Said and Port Fuad and began occupying the canal zone. This move was soon met by growing opposition at home and by U.S.-sponsored resolutions in the UN (made in part to counter Soviet threats of intervention), which quickly put a stop to the Anglo-French action. On 22 December the UN evacuated British and French troops, and Israeli forces withdrew in March 1957.

=== Invasion ===
After the Israeli invasion of Egypt, Britain and France demanded for both Israeli and Egyptian troops to withdraw from the Suez Canal. If Egypt and Israel did not follow these orders, Britain and France stated that they would intervene in the war to enforce a cease-fire previously ordered by the United Nations. Neither country obliged to this request, so on 5 November and 6 November 1956, many British and French troops landed at Port Said and Port Fuad, two cities in Egypt. The forces reached the Suez Canal zone and promptly occupied it.

=== Global response and withdrawal ===
After this invasion and occupation of the Suez Canal, many nations expressed extreme concern, mainly the United States and from the British and French people themselves. Fears of Soviet intervention in the war made tensions worsen and further discouraged Britain and France from continuing their invasion. On 22 December 1956, with the help from the United Nations, British and French troops withdrew from Egypt, ending in a "disaster" for the United Kingdom and France.
