= The World at War =

1973 British television documentary series

- Created by: Jeremy Isaacs
- Directed by: David Elstein
- Narrated by: The Lord Olivier
- Opening theme: The World at War Theme
- Composer: Carl Davis
- Country of origin: United Kingdom
- Original language: English
- No. of series: 1
- No. of episodes: 26

Production
- Producer: Thames Television
- Running time: 22 hours 32 minutes

Original release
- Network: ITV
- Release: 31 October 1973 – 8 May 1974

The World at War is a 26-episode British documentary television series that chronicles the events of the Second World War and aired between 31 October 1973 – 8 May 1974 on ITV. Produced by Thames Television in collaboration with the Imperial War Museum, it took four years to make at a cost of around £880,000 (equivalent to £12,900,000 in 2025), making it the most expensive factual series ever made at the time. It was produced by Jeremy Isaacs, narrated by Lord Olivier and included music composed by Carl Davis. A tie-in book of the same name was written by Mark Arnold-Forster and published in 1973.

Hundreds of hours of interviews were filmed, primarily with surviving aides and assistants to prominent figures, soldiers, sailors, airmen, civilians, concentration camp inmates and other victims of the war. The episodes covered the 15 most prominent battles of the war, along with related topics such as the Holocaust, the political context and civilian experiences of the affected countries. So much footage went unused that Thames Television commissioned a further eight episodes of various lengths, which were narrated by Eric Porter and aired between 30 April 1975 – 18 August 1976.

The World at War attracted widespread acclaim and now it is regarded as a landmark in British television history. In the British Film Institute's 2000 list of the 100 Greatest British Television Programmes, The World at War placed 19th, the highest-placed documentary on the list.

== Overview ==
Jeremy Isaacs had been inspired to look at the production of a long-form documentary series about the Second World War following the BBC's broadcast of its series The Great War in 1964. The BBC series, produced in collaboration with the Imperial War Museum, featured a mix of contemporary film footage from the period and film recreations, which soured relations between the BBC and the Museum. As a consequence, Isaacs was determined to have his programme be as authentic as possible.

The World at War was commissioned by Thames Television in 1969. The government had halved its levy on television advertising revenue, with the proviso that the money which the independent television companies saved must be reinvested in programmes. Isaacs persuaded Thames to use the money to pay for the production of his Second World War documentary. The series took four years to produce, at a cost of £900,000 (equivalent to £9,800,000 in 2025), a record for a British television series. It was first shown in 1973 on ITV.

The series featured interviews with major members of the Allied and Axis campaigns, including witness accounts from civilians, enlisted men, officers and politicians. The interviewees included Sir Max Aitken, Joseph Lawton Collins, Mark Clark, Jock Colville, Karl Dönitz, James "Jimmy" Doolittle, Lawrence Durrell, the Earl of Avon, Mitsuo Fuchida, Adolf Galland, Minoru Genda, W. Averell Harriman, Sir Arthur Harris, Alger Hiss, Brian Horrocks, Traudl Junge, Toshikazu Kase, Curtis LeMay, Vera Lynn, Hasso von Manteuffel, Bill Mauldin, John J. McCloy, Lord Mountbatten of Burma, Sir Richard O'Connor, J. B. Priestley, Saburo Sakai, Albert Speer, James Stewart, Charles Sweeney, Paul Tibbets, Walter Warlimont, Takeo Yoshikawa and historian Stephen Ambrose.

In the programme The Making of "The World at War", included in the DVD set, Isaacs explains that priority was given to interviews with surviving aides and assistants rather than recognised figures. The most difficult person to locate and persuade to be interviewed was Heinrich Himmler's adjutant Karl Wolff. During the interview, he admitted to witnessing a mass execution in Himmler's presence. Isaacs later expressed satisfaction with the series's content, noting that if it had not been secret, he would have added references to British codebreaking at Bletchley Park. In a list of the 100 Greatest British Television Programmes which was compiled by the British Film Institute during 2000, voted for by industry professionals, The World at War ranked 19th, the highest-placed documentary on the list.

== Episodes ==
The series has twenty-six episodes. Isaacs asked Noble Frankland, director of the Imperial War Museum, to list fifteen main campaigns of the war and devoted one episode to each. The remaining eleven episodes are devoted to other matters, such as the rise of Nazi Germany, home life in Britain and Germany, the experience of occupation of the Netherlands, and the Holocaust. Episode one begins with a cold open describing the massacre at the French village of Oradour-sur-Glane by the Waffen SS. The same event is referenced again at the end of Episode twenty-six, accompanied by the "Dona nobis pacem" (Latin for "Grant us peace") from the Missa Sancti Nicolai, composed by Joseph Haydn. The series ends with Laurence Olivier saying "Remember". For all but three episodes ("The Desert", "Home Fires", and "Remember"), the last scene of each episode either ended as a photograph or would be a freeze-frame shot of a film, and then change to a textured photograph before the credits roll. They would show the textured photograph only when The World at War logo appeared in both "The Desert" and "Home Fires" episodes. In the "Remember" episode, it would show the fire used during the title part as the credits roll before extinguishing itself at the end.

No.	Title	Original release date
1	"A New Germany (1933–1939)"	31 October 1973
The rebirth of Germany and growth in power of the Nazi Party leading up to the outbreak of war. Interviewees include Hans Kehrl, Konrad Morgen, Hugh Greene, Ewald-Heinrich von Kleist-Schmenzin, Werner Pusch, Christabel Bielenberg, Siegmund Weltlinger and Emmi Bonhoeffer.
2	"Distant War (September 1939 – May 1940)"	7 November 1973
The invasions of Poland, the Winter War, the sinking of the Graf Spee, the "phony war" and Norwegian campaign and the elevation of Winston Churchill to Prime Minister. Interviewees include Lord Boothby, Rab Butler, Bernard Kops, Lucy Faithfull, Lord Chandos, Admiral Charles Woodhouse, Sir Martin Lindsay and Sir John "Jock" Colville.
3	"France Falls (May–June 1940)"	14 November 1973
French politics, the Maginot Line, the Saar Offensive, Blitzkrieg warfare and the Nazi invasion of France and the Low Countries. Interviewees include General Hasso von Manteuffel, General André Beaufre, Lawrence Durrell, General Siegfried Westphal, Gordon Waterfield, General Walter Warlimont and Major General Edward Spears.
4	"Alone (May 1940 – May 1941)"	21 November 1973
The Battle of Britain, defeats in Greece and Crete, Tobruk and life in Britain between the evacuation at Dunkirk and Operation Barbarossa. Interviewees include Anthony Eden, J. B. Priestley, Sir Max Aitken, Lieutenant General Adolf Galland, Sir John "Jock" Colville, Robert Wright, Ray Holmes and a group of survivors of The Blitz.
5	"Barbarossa (June–December 1941)"	28 November 1973
After dominating southeastern Europe through force or intrigue, Germany begins Operation Barbarossa, the invasion of the Soviet Union. Despite several quick victories, the invasion fails after the assault on Moscow in winter. Interviewees include General Walter Warlimont, Albert Speer, Paul Schmidt, Grigori Tokaty, W. Averell Harriman and Sir John Russell.
6	"Banzai!: Japan (1931–1942)"	5 December 1973
The rise of the Japanese Empire, the Sino-Japanese War, the Soviet-Japanese border conflicts, Pearl Harbor and the early Japanese successes in the Battle of Malaya and Battle of Singapore. Interviewees include Kōichi Kido, Toshikazu Kase, Minoru Genda, Mitsuo Fuchida, Masatake Okumiya, Takeo Yoshikawa, John Smyth and Ichiji Sugita.
7	"On Our Way: U.S.A. (1939–1942)"	12 December 1973
The opposition by factions to the United States of America's entry into the war, Lend Lease, U-boat attacks on Atlantic convoys and American responses, the mobilisation of America after Pearl Harbor, the loss of the Philippines, the Doolittle Raid, Midway and Guadalcanal. Interviewees include W. Averell Harriman, George Ball, Norman Corwin, Ken Galbraith, John J. McCloy, Edison Uno, Paul Samuelson, Isamu Noguchi, Jimmy Doolittle, Richard Tregaskis, Minoru Genda, Mitsuo Fuchida, J. Lawton Collins and Vannevar Bush.
8	"The Desert: North Africa (1940–1943)"	19 December 1973
The Desert War, starting with Italy's invasion of Egypt and the attacks and counterattacks between Germany and Italy and the Commonwealth forces, the Axis defeat at El Alamein. Interviewees include General Richard O'Connor, Major General Francis de Guingand, Siegfried Westphal, Field Marshal Lord Harding and Lawrence Durrell.
9	"Stalingrad (June 1942 – February 1943)"	2 January 1974
The mid-war German situation in Southern Russia resulting in the German defeat at the Battle of Stalingrad. This episode features only Olivier's narration and has no interviewees.
10	"Wolf Pack: U-Boats in the Atlantic (1939–1944)"	9 January 1974
The submarine war emphasising the North Atlantic. Tracks the development of the convoy system and German submarine strategy. Interviewees include Grand Admiral Karl Dönitz, Otto Kretschmer, Captain William Eyton-Jones, Captain Gilbert Roberts, Vice Admiral Sir Peter Gretton, Air Vice Marshal Wilfrid Oulton, Peter-Erich Cremer and Raymond Hart.
11	"Red Star: The Soviet Union (1941–1943)"	16 January 1974
The rise of the Red Army, mobilisation of Soviet production, the Siege of Leningrad, the Soviet partisans and the Battle of Kursk. Interviewees include General Ivan Lyudnikov and Ivan Chistyakov.
12	"Whirlwind: Bombing Germany (September 1939 – April 1944)"	23 January 1974
The development of British and American strategic bombing. Interviewees include Marshal of the Royal Air Force Sir Arthur Harris, Albert Speer, Brigadier-General James Stewart, Hamish Mahaddie, William Reid, General Leon W. Johnson, General Curtis LeMay, Wilhelm Herget, Werner Schröer, Lieutenant General Adolf Galland and General Ira C. Eaker.
13	"Tough Old Gut: Italy (November 1942 – June 1944)"	30 January 1974
The difficulties of the Italian Campaign beginning with Operation Torch in North Africa, the invasion of Sicily; Salerno, Anzio, Cassino and the capture of Rome. Interviewees include General Sir Kenneth Strong, General Mark Clark, Field Marshal Lord Harding, Bill Mauldin, Wynford Vaughan-Thomas and Siegfried Westphal.
14	"It's a Lovely Day Tomorrow: Burma (1942–1944)"	6 February 1974
The jungle war in Burma and India—what it "lacked in scale was made up in savagery". Interviewees include Teruo Okada, Mike Calvert, Sir John Smyth and Vera Lynn (the episode title is the name of one of her songs), and Lord Mountbatten of Burma.
15	"Home Fires: Britain (1940–1944)"	13 February 1974
Life and politics in Britain from post-Battle of Britain to the first V-1 attacks. Interviewees include Rab Butler, Lord Shinwell, Lord Chandos, Tom Driberg, Anthony Eden, Michael Foot, Cecil Harmsworth King and J. B. Priestley.
16	"Inside the Reich: Germany (1940–1944)"	20 February 1974
Changes in German society as the fortunes of war are reversed. Censorship and popular entertainment, German industry, the recruitment of female, foreign and slave labour, Allied bombing, German dissent—including the 20 July plot, and the mobilisation of the Volkssturm towards war's end. Interviewees include Christabel Bielenberg, Friedrich Luft, Albert Speer, Emmi Bonhoeffer, Otto John, Traudl Junge, Richard Schulze-Kossens, and Otto Ernst Remer.
17	"Morning (June–August 1944)"	27 February 1974
Operation Overlord starting with the failed Dieppe Raid, followed by battles in the Bocage, the Allied breakout and Falaise. Interviewees include Goronwy Rees, Lord Mountbatten of Burma, Kay Summersby, James Stagg and Major General J. Lawton Collins.
18	"Occupation: Holland (1940–1944)"	13 March 1974
Life in the Netherlands under German occupation, when citizens chose to resist, collaborate or remain passive. Interviewees include Gerben Wagenaar, Florentine Rost van Tonningen, Loe de Jong (who also served as adviser for this episode), Jetty Paerl and Prince Bernhard of Lippe-Biesterfeld.
19	"Pincers (August 1944 – March 1945)"	20 March 1974
Operation Dragoon, the liberation of Paris, the Allied occupation of France and the failure of Operation Market Garden, the Warsaw Uprising, the Battle of the Bulge and the crossing of the Rhine. In the East, the Romanian coup and the Soviet advance through Ukraine to East Prussia. Interviewees include Lieutenant General Brian Horrocks, Wynford Vaughan Thomas, General Sir Kenneth Strong, General Hasso von Manteuffel, Major General Francis de Guingand, W. Averell Harriman, General Siegfried Westphal and Major General J. Lawton Collins.
20	"Genocide (1941–1945)"	27 March 1974
Begins with the founding of the SS and follows the development of Nazi racial theory. It ends with the implementation of the Final Solution. Interviewees include Karl Wolff, Wilhelm Höttl, Rudolf Vrba, Primo Levi, Richard Böck, Anthony Eden and Rivka Yosilevska.
21	"Nemesis: Germany (February–May 1945)"	3 April 1974
The invasion of Germany by the Allies, the bombing of Dresden, and the events in the Führerbunker during the Battle of Berlin. Interviewees include Albert Speer, Traudl Junge, Carola Stern, Elena Rzhevskaya, Heinz Linge, Eberhard Bethge, Major Anna Nikulina and Friedrich Luft.
22	"Japan (1941–1945)"	10 April 1974
Japanese society during wartime and how life is transformed as the country suffers defeats including the Doolittle Raid, Midway, the death of Isoroku Yamamoto, the Battle of Saipan, Okinawa and the relentless bombing of Japanese cities. Interviewees include Toshikazu Kase and Naoki Hoshino.
23	"Pacific (February 1942 – July 1945)"	17 April 1974
Battles on tiny islands in the Pacific, aimed towards the Japanese heartland. Following the bombing of Darwin, the Japanese are turned back at Kokoda, Tarawa, Peleliu, the Philippines, Iwo Jima and finally Okinawa. Interviewees include Butch Voris and Frank Manson.
24	"The Bomb (February–September 1945)"	24 April 1974
The atomic bomb, the ascendency of President Harry Truman, emerging splits in the Allies with Joseph Stalin, the atomic bombings of Hiroshima and Nagasaki and the Soviet invasion of Manchuria, leading to the surrender of Japan. Interviewees include Toshikazu Kase, Yoshio Kodama, Marquis Koichi Kido, Major General Charles Sweeney, Brigadier General Paul Tibbets, Alger Hiss, W. Averell Harriman, Anthony Eden, McGeorge Bundy, John J. McCloy, General Curtis LeMay, Hisatsune Sakomizu, Kiyoshi Tanimoto, Robert Oppenheimer (before his 1967 death), and James F. Byrnes (before his 1972 death).
25	"Reckoning (April 1945)"	1 May 1974
Post-war Europe including the Allied occupation of Germany, demobilisation, the Nuremberg Trials and the genesis of the Cold War. The episode concludes with summations about the costs and consequences of the war. Interviewees include Charles Bohlen, Stephen Ambrose, Kay Summersby, Anthony Eden, W. Averell Harriman, Lord Mountbatten of Burma, Hartley Shawcross and Noble Frankland.
26	"Remember"	8 May 1974
How the war was experienced and remembered by its witnesses. Interviewees include Lawrence Durrell, J. Glenn Gray, Bill Mauldin, Wynford Vaughan-Thomas and Noble Frankland.

== Broadcast history ==
The series was originally transmitted on the ITV network in Britain between 31 October 1973 and 8 May 1974, and has been shown around the world. It was first shown in the US in syndication on various stations in 1974. WOR in New York aired the series in the mid-1970s, although episodes were edited both for graphic content and to include sufficient commercial breaks. PBS station WNET in New York broadcast the series unedited and in its entirety in 1982 as did WGBH in the late 1980s. The Danish channel DR1 first broadcast the series from August 1976 to February 1977 and it was repeated on DR2 in December 2006 and January 2007. The History Channel in Japan began screening the series in its entirety in April 2007. It repeated the entire series again in August 2011. The Military History Channel in the UK broadcast the series over the weekend of 14 and 15 November 2009. The Military Channel (now American Heroes Channel) in the United States aired the series in January 2010, and has shown it regularly since. BBC2 in the UK transmitted a repeat run of the series starting on 5 September 1994 at teatime. In 2011, the British channel Yesterday started a showing of the series and it has been shown continuously since.

The series was shown on SABC in South Africa in 1976, one of the first documentary series broadcast after the launch of the first television service in South Africa in January 1976, but the episode showing the Nazi holocaust was not shown.

The series was shown in Australia in 1975 and has been shown on various TV stations at various times since then. It has also been shown on Australia's Pay TV Provider Foxtel in the early 2000s and a number of times since.

Each episode was 52 minutes excluding commercials; as was customary for hour-long ITV episodes at the time, it was originally screened with only one central break. On its original television broadcast in the UK the twentieth episode "Genocide (1941–1945)", which dealt with Nazi concentration camps and the Holocaust, was shown uninterrupted without a commercial break due to the sensitive nature of its content.

=== Additional episodes ===
So extensive was the amount of footage both shot and collected by Isaacs and his team that much went unused in the original 26-episode series. As a result, eight further documentaries were commissioned by Thames Television, ranging from 30 minutes to 100 minutes in length. The topics of these additional programmes include the theories and myths surrounding Hitler's death, the Auschwitz death camp, Germany under the rule of the Nazis, and a full interview with Hitler's personal secretary Traudl Junge. Due to Laurence Olivier being unavailable these additional documentaries were narrated instead by actor Eric Porter. These were released as a bonus to the VHS version and have been included on all DVD and Blu-ray sets of the series since.

The additional episodes and their original UK broadcast dates (where known) are:

1. The Two Deaths of Adolf Hitler [30 April 1975]
2. The Final Solution - Auschwitz: Part One [12 August 1975]
3. The Final Solution - Auschwitz: Part Two [19 August 1975]
4. Warrior [11 November 1975]
5. Hitler's Germany: The People's Community (1933–1939) [11 August 1976]
6. Hitler's Germany: Total War (1939–1945) [18 August 1976]
7. Secretary to Hitler
8. From War to Peace

Four further documentaries were created specially for home video releases, these are:

1. The Making of the Series: The World at War [1989]
2. Making of the Series - A 30th Anniversary Retrospective [2003]
3. Experiences of War
4. Restoring the World at War

=== The World at War: Another Look ===
A follow-up series was produced in 1983 by Jerry Kuehl (who had worked on the original The World At War) called The World At War: Another Look, a Channel 4 series re-examining the original programmes with the benefit of a decade's hindsight. Transmitted at the end of 1983 and early 1984 - one episode a month - it features a number of academic historians and news cameramen who were responsible for filming some of the archive footage used in The World at War. The first episode was described in The Times as dealing “with the political, ethical and strategic pressures on cameramen covering war, and asks how much we should believe of what we are shown.”

== Home media history ==
The series was released in various territories on VHS video as well as on 13 Laservision long-play videodiscs by Video Garant Amsterdam. In 2001–2005, DVD box sets were released in the UK and US. In 2010, the series was digitally restored and re-released on DVD and Blu-ray. In the latter case the image is cropped from its original 1.33:1 aspect ratio down to 1.78:1, to better fit modern widescreen televisions. The restored series was re-released on DVD and Blu-ray in its original aspect ratio in the United Kingdom on 31 October 2016.

== Books ==
The original book The World at War, which accompanied the series, was written by Mark Arnold-Forster in 1973. In October 2007, Ebury Press published The World at War, a new book by Richard Holmes, an oral history of the Second World War drawn from the interviews conducted for the TV series. The programme's producers shot hundreds of hours of interviews, but only a fraction of that recorded material was used for the final version of the series. A selection of the rest of this material was published in this book, which included interviews with Albert Speer, Karl Wolff (Himmler's adjutant), Traudl Junge (Hitler's secretary), James Stewart (USAAF bomber pilot and Hollywood star), Anthony Eden, John Colville (Private Secretary to Winston Churchill), Averell Harriman (US Ambassador to the Soviet Union) and Arthur "Bomber" Harris (Head of RAF Bomber Command).

== See also ==
- All Our Yesterdays – a Granada TV series covering some of this period.
- Apocalypse: The Second World War (2009) – an RTBF documentary on the Second World War
- BBC History of World War II (1989–2005)
- Cold War (1998) CNN TV production also produced by Jeremy Isaacs
- The Great War (1964) – BBC TV production
- The Secret War (1977) – a BBC TV series on the technological advances of the Second World War
- The Unknown War (1978) – an American documentary television series, produced with Soviet cooperation after the release of The World at War, which the Soviet government felt had paid insufficient attention to their part in World War II, the series was narrated by Burt Lancaster
- World War One (1964) – a Production of CBS
