= Hans Delbrück =

German historian (1848–1929)

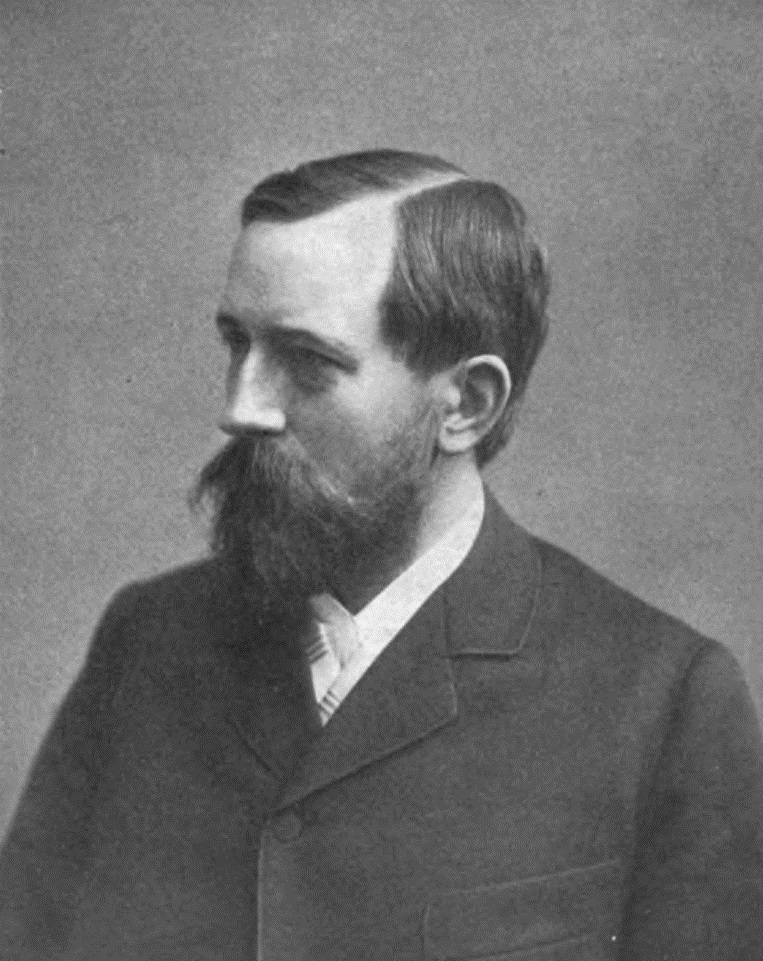
- Hans Delbrück before 1902

Member of the Reichstag
- In office 28 October 1884 – 20 February 1890
- Constituency: Rügen-Stralsund

Member of the Prussian House of Representatives
- In office 14 November 1882 – 5 September 1885
- Constituency: Bergen

Personal details
- Born: Hans Gottlieb Leopold Delbrück; 11 November 1848 Rügen, Prussia
- Died: 14 July 1929 (aged 80) Berlin, Germany
- Party: Free Conservative
- Spouse: Carolina "Lina" Thiersch (m. 1884; died 1929)
- Children: 7, including Max and Emmi
- Education: Heidelberg University; University of Bonn
- Profession: Historian
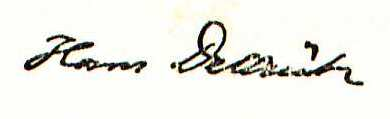
- Signature

Hans Gottlieb Leopold Delbrück (German pronunciation: [hans ˈdɛl.bʁʏk]; 11 November 1848 – 14 July 1929) was a German historian. Delbrück was one of the first modern military historians, basing his method of research on the critical examination of ancient sources, using auxiliary disciplines, like demography and economics, to complete the analysis and the comparison between epochs, to trace the evolution of military institutions.

Delbrück's writings are chiefly concerned with the history of the art of war, his most ambitious work being Geschichte der Kriegskunst im Rahmen der politischen Geschichte ("History of Warfare in the Framework of Political History" in four volumes, third edition published in 1920). Other works are Die Perserkriege und die Burgunderkriege (The Persian and Burgundian Wars, 1887), Die Strategie des Perikles erläutert durch die Strategie Friedrichs des Grossen (The Strategy of Pericles Described Through the Strategy of Frederick the Great, 1890) and Das Leben des Feldmarschalls Grafen Neithardt von Gneisenau (Life of Marshal Count Neithardt von Gneisenau, 1894).

== Biography ==
Delbrück was born in Bergen on the island of Rügen; he studied at the universities of Heidelberg and Bonn. As a soldier, he fought in the Franco-Prussian War and in 1874, he became for some years tutor to Prince Waldemar of Prussia of the German imperial family, a brother of Wilhelm II, heir to the imperial throne. He served in the Reichstag from 1882 to 1883 and in 1883, he became an editor of the Preussische Jahrbücher, a noted political magazine. He assumed charge of this publication in 1889 and kept working on it in that capacity until 1920.

In 1885, he became professor of modern history in the University of Berlin, where his lectures were very popular. He was a member of the German Reichstag from 1884 to 1890. Delbrück vigorously opposed the policy of the Prussian government in dealing with the Danes and the Poles, with the result that he was twice subjected to disciplinary penalties as a professor and a civil servant in Prussia. One of his American students Arthur L. Conger became a senior military historian at the United States Army Command and General Staff College, where he modelled American military historiography after Delbrück's approaches.

His role as editor of Preussen Jahrbücher provided a platform for a growing interest in Germany's diplomatic relationship with Russia. This took the form of a roving commission to Herr Paul Rohrbacher to enquire about German opinion. The findings from the 1890s tours formed a racial policy of dismemberment of Russia by seizing Slavic territory that belonged to them. The controversialist Fritz Fischer argued that they were socialists forcing extremists into the hands of revolutionaries. At an early stage of the First World War, he became pessimistic regarding the possibility of victory, except by a military and political strategy and tactics of a purely defensive character. He was, on tactical rather than on moral grounds, a strenuous opponent of intensified submarine warfare and did not conceal his conviction that it would bring America into the war. He was a member of the German Delegation during the Versailles Peace Conference that ended the war, where he mainly endeavoured to prove that Germany could not be made solely responsible for the outbreak of war.

He died in Berlin. He was the father of Max Delbrück, who did pioneering work in physics and also won the Nobel Prize in Physiology or Medicine in 1969. His daughter Emmi was married to German resistance fighter Klaus Bonhoeffer and thus she was the sister-in-law of theologian Dietrich Bonhoeffer.

== Hypotheses ==
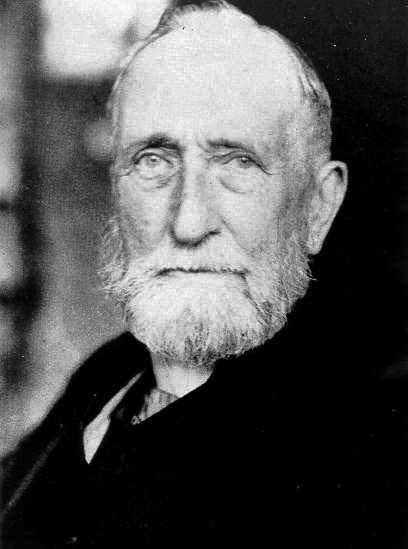
Hans Delbrück later in life

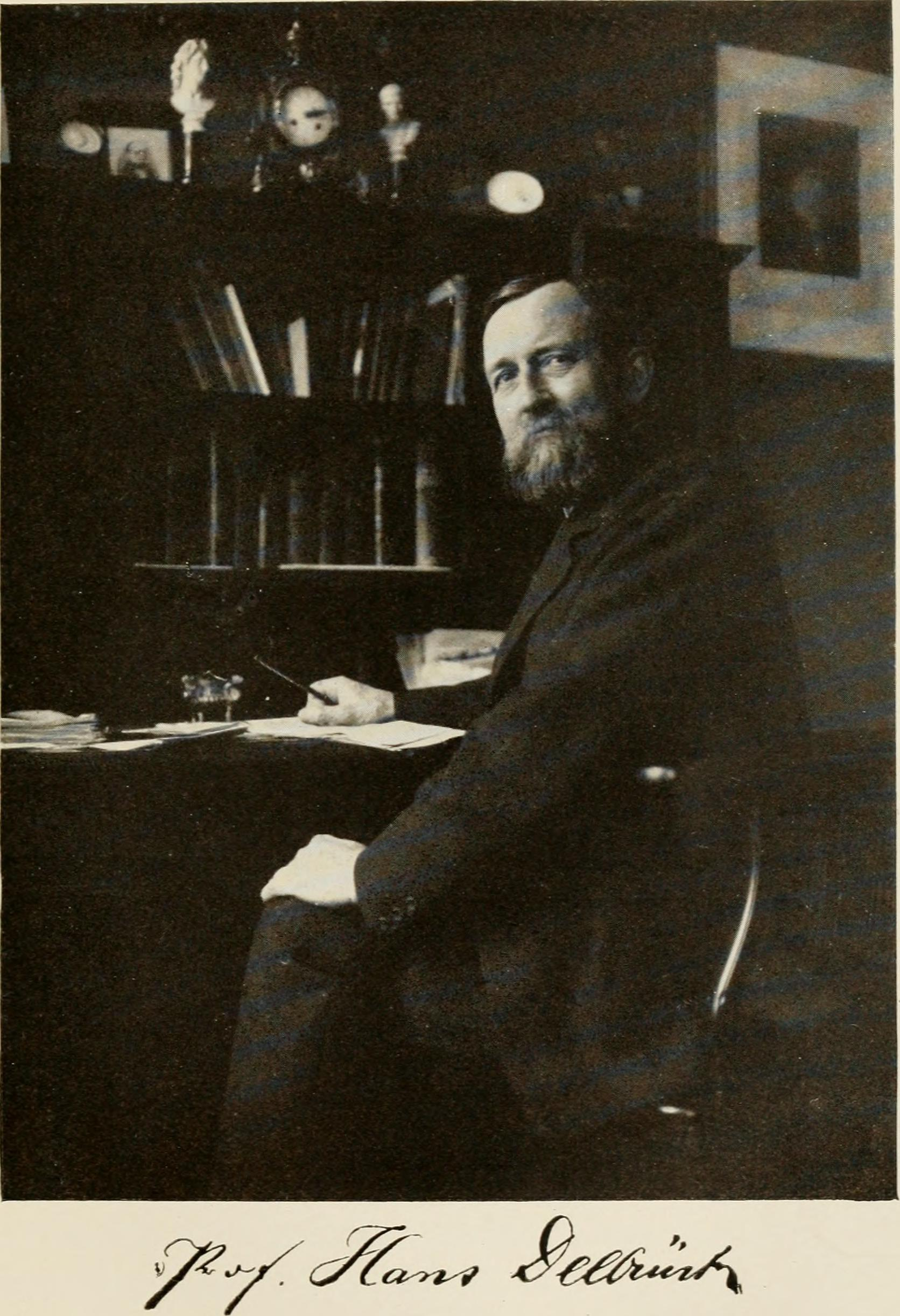
Hans Delbrück

Delbrück's works tried to place military history in the framework of general history. He regarded warfare as a cultural feature of societies, subject to evolution and influenced by the economy and the political system. His works were not translated into English for some time, hence his reputation among professional military theorists in English-speaking countries is not held in the same esteem or significance as Clausewitz.

=== Ancient warfare ===
Singular conclusions on ancient warfare challenged historiography in so far as he tried to show that the figures for armies in antiquity were inflated in the original sources, and that, contrary to what is stated in most writings, the winner in a battle usually had more troops than the loser. Consequently, he gave completely different interpretations to some of the most famous battles in history, like Marathon, Gaugamela, and Zama by concluding that Rome's vaunted advantage over "barbarians" rested, not so much in their discipline and refined tactics, but rather in their superior logistical support. The Romans were able to raise and maintain huge armies on the field, while the "barbarians" were unable to match their numbers.

=== Medieval warfare ===
Regarding medieval warfare, Delbrück's findings were more controversial. He made a distinction between knights, mounted warriors, and cavalry, an organized mass of mounted troops. He regarded the medieval warrior as an independent fighter, unable to join others and form units with any decisive tactical significance. His conclusions were tested by later scholars, in particular the Belgian historian J. F. Verbruggen.

=== Modern warfare ===
About modern warfare, Delbrück showed his intellectual origins in Clausewitz by making a distinction between two possible strategies respectively: exhausting the enemy and throwing down the enemy (German: Ermattungsstrategie and Niederwerfungsstrategie, often, albeit to some inaccurately, translated as "attrition" and "annihilation"). They were derived from Clausewitz's distinctions between strategies seeking limited objectives and strategies aimed at rendering one's opponent militarily helpless, the latter being often confused with the concept of "total war" advocated by Ludendorff and rejected by Delbrück during wartime. The choice depended on the nature of the political objectives, the existing political and economic limitations and the correlation of force numbers. He applied the analytical tool to the wars of Frederick the Great and concluded that their numerical inferiority made the Prussians pursue a strategy of exhaustion.

His overall treatment of the era, however, partially overlooked the Spanish wars. He was very critical of his country's strategic thinking, and he averred it would have been preferable to seek victory in the East, gain minor objectives in the West and then sue for peace. That was one example of the general principle that he maintained: military and political manoeuvres should be integrated.

== In fiction ==
In Mel Brooks's comedy Young Frankenstein, Doctor Frankenstein sends his assistant, Igor, to retrieve the brain of Hans Delbrück for transplant into Frankenstein's monster. The tag on the beaker containing the brain reads "scientist and saint," so it is debatable whether Brooks intended the actual historian or a fictional Delbrück.

In a clearer reference to the historical figure, in Mel Brooks's comedy The Producers, Hans Delbrück is the name of the man to whom Franz Liebkind sends a letter by carrier pigeon.

In Victor Serge’s novel Unforgiving Years (Les Années sans pardon) the character Herr Schiff—an old German professor loyal to the Nazi regime, demoralized and disoriented in war-ravaged Berlin in the closing days of the Second World War—rereads Hans Delbrück’s The History of Warfare: "Lately, it was true, the sense of most of what he read escaped him; but being incapable of inattention, the mechanical act of reading acted upon him like a sedative. His cheek cupped in his hand, he reread the works he admired out of duty." Hans Delbrück appears in the professor's thoughts again while contemplating the meaning of the war as American soldiers overtake Berlin: "The Second World War was already down as a great historical tragedy—a quasi-mythological one—which neither Mommsen, Hans Delbrück, Gobineau, Houston Stewart Chamberlain, Oswald Spengler, or Mein Kampf could elucidate entirely..."

== Works ==
Other works of Delbrück, besides those mentioned above, are the following:

=== Books ===
- Historische und politische Aufsätze (1886)
- Erinnerungen, Aufsätze und Reden (1902)
- Die Polenfrage (1894)
- Numbers in History (1913)
- Regierung und Volkswille (1914)
- Bismarcks Erbe (1915)
- Krieg und Politik (1918)
- Kautsky und Harden (1920)
- Ludendorff, Tirpitz, Falkenhayn (1920)
- History of the Art of War, (1920) University of Nebraska Press; Reprint edition, 1990. Translated by Walter J. Renfroe. 4 Volumes.

In his book Regierung und Volkswille (1914), Delbrück attempted a defence of the old system of government in Germany and Prussia with particular reference to its "dualism," parliamentary representation and simultaneously a certain degree of autocracy on the part of the sovereign in Prussia and of the federated government in the empire. A succinct statement of Delbrück's views on Germany's responsibility for World War I and an English reply can be found in articles by Delbrück and J. W. Headlam-Morley in the Contemporary Review (March 1921).

=== Journals ===
- Editor of Preußische Jahrbücher, vol. 149 (1912)
- "Die Differenzen über die Kriegsziele hüben und drüben". Preußische Jahrbücher, vol. 162, pp. 167–172 (1915)

== See also ==
- German Empire
- Mitteleuropa
- Schlieffen Plan
- Septemberprogramm

== Sources ==
- Bucholz, Arden (1985): Hans Delbrück and the German Military Establishment: War Images in Conflict, Iowa City.
- Bucholz, Arden (1993): "Hans Delbrück and Modern Military History". The Historian 55 (March 1993), 517–26.
- Pöhlmann, Markus (2002): Kriegsgeschichte und Geschichtspolitik: Der Erste Weltkrieg: Die amtliche deutsche Militärgeschichtsschreibung 1914-1956, Paderborn.
- Thimme, Annelise (1955): Hans Delbrück als Kritiker der Wilhelminischen Epoche, Düsseldorf.
