= Hugh Eyton-Jones =

British clergyman and missionary

Hugh Mortimer Eyton-Jones
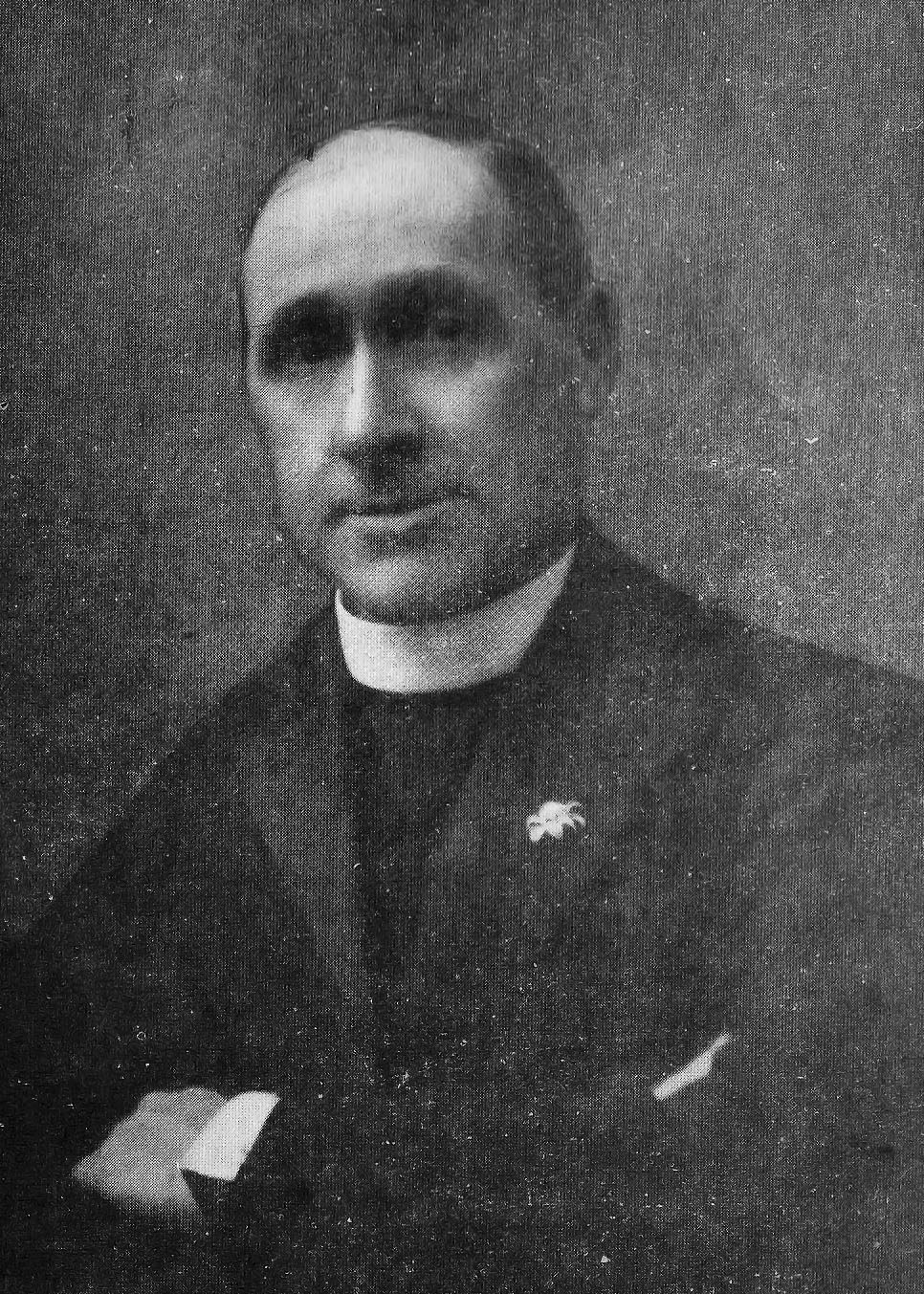
- Eyton-Jones in the 1910s
- Born: 17 September 1863; Wrexham, Denbighshire Wales
- Died: 25 March 1943 (aged 79); Hounslow, Middlesex, England
- Military career
- Relatives: Thomas Eyton-Jones (father); John Eyton-Jones (brother); David Eyton-Jones (grandson); William Eyton-Jones (nephew)
- Allegiance: United Kingdom
- Branch: (United Kingdom) British Army (United Kingdom) Royal Air Force
- Service years: 1914–1939
- Rank: Chaplain to the Forces 1st Class
- Units: Royal Army Chaplains' Department; Royal Air Force Chaplains Branch
- Conflicts: World War I World War II

Chaplain to the Forces 1st Class, The Reverend Hugh Mortimer Eyton-Jones (17 September 1863 – 25 March 1943) was a clergyman, missionary and member of the Church Missionary Society, preaching the Gospel in Fuh Ning, China from 1889 – 1900, serving as Vicar of St. Paul's, Hounslow later in life.

== Early life ==
The son of the Dr. Thomas Eyton-Jones of Wrexham, a nephew of Sir Edward Samuelson who was Lord Mayor of Liverpool 1872 – 1873 and a great nephew of Sir Rowland Hill, the inventor of the Penny Post. Eyton-Jones was brought up as a devoutly conservative Christian and was encouraged to develop an interest in theological, political and social matters.

== Career ==
Eyton-Jones took his theological education at Jesus College, Cambridge, where he obtained a B.A. degree in 1885 and an M.A. in 1894, before going to study at Ridley Hall, Cambridge. He was ordained deacon in 1886 and on 18 December 1887 he was ordained a priest at Worcester Cathedral. From 1886 to 1889 he was curate of St. Clement's, Birmingham, which is where he met Jane Elizabeth Savage, who would later become his wife, both of whom had a shared interest in volunteering and overseas missionary work.

Having been influenced by the Cambridge Seven, who had formed to preach in China through the China Inland Mission in 1885, Eyton-Jones was initiated into the Church Missionary Society (CMS) in March 1889. In October 1889, at a valedictory meeting held in the Henry Martyn Memorial Hall, a centre of Christian and missionary influence, Eyton-Jones was one of eight men who had named themselves The Cambridge Eight to discuss their departure under the Church Missionary Society. Eyton-Jones volunteered for the mission field in China, then under the Qing dynasty.

Eyton-Jones and his wife sailed in 1889 and stayed in the area around Fuzhou on the south east coast for eight years. This one hundred mile expanse became his parish including two large harbours and their surrounding villages as well as several islands located twenty miles from the mainland. The couple's first three children were born in China, where they spent eight years with the CMS. For transport he sailed up the rivers in a yacht presented to him by his uncle Sir Edward Samuelson.

Within a year his language became fluent and his background in boxing gave him a good foundation in Jujutsu. In March 1895 at the Consular District of Fuzhou where Eyton-Jones had opened a book shop having been provided a passport by the Prefect of Fujian, an attempt was made on his life by a follower of the zhaijiao "fasting school" who had been protesting against the Christian missionaries for some time, the culprit drew a knife and ran at him before being rendered defenceless by eyewitnesses and was identified as a servant of the local magistrate and so received no punishment.

On 2 August 1895 Eyton-Jones conducted the funeral service for the Rev. Robert Stewart, who was murdered along with ten other people including his family members in 1895. Known as The Kucheng Massacre, this traumatic incident would have had a lasting psychological effect on Eyton-Jones. Ill health made him return to the United Kingdom in 1900, spending one year living with the family of his older brother John Eyton-Jones at Abbotsfield, Wrexham, before moving to London.

From 1900 to 1911 Eyton-Jones was curate of St. Stephen's, Ealing, then became vicar of St. Paul's Hounslow Heath in 1911. Over 31 years in this role, Hounslow developed from a semi-rural district to a significant London suburb. He was appointed surrogate in 1918.

During World War I he was appointed as clergyman assisting the Chaplain to the Forces in presiding over servicemen. He was later chosen by the Chaplain-in-Chief of the Royal Air Force to be minister to squadrons in training on Hounslow Heath, also serving as Chaplain to the Officer Training Corps of the Inns of Court Regiment until the outbreak of World War II. Eyton-Jones was employed by the Royal Army Chaplains' Department to work as chaplain at Hounslow Barracks for four months. Throughout the war he worked closely with the YMCA, allowing the church hall to be used as a rest and social centre for military people stationed locally. During The Blitz he visited bomb shelters to preach and counsel the occupants.

Eyton-Jones was known to be a member of the Sir Garnet Wolseley Lodge of the Royal Antediluvian Order of Buffaloes.

== Death ==
His wife Jane Elizabeth Eyton-Jones died during the war in May 1940. A severe attack of shingles inspired him to write a letter of resignation to the bishop in the winter of 1942, however he died in the spring of 1943.
