= Siegmund Weltlinger =

Siegmund Weltlinger (March 29, 1886, in Hamburg – May 18, 1974, in Berlin) was a founding member and first Jewish president of the Society for Christian-Jewish Cooperation in Berlin from 1949 to 1970. He was honorary president since 1970. Weltlinger was also a CDU member.

== Early life ==
Weltlinger was born in 1886 in Hamburg and grew up in Kassel, where he performed his military service after high school and then completed a banking apprenticeship. During the First World War, he served as a front-line soldier in 1915. Later, he was transferred as a financial expert in the central buying group of Belgian civilian administration. In November 1918, he went back to Berlin, where he was married a year later.

== Between the wars ==
He joined the bank, Julius I. Mayer, as a profit-participating attorney. In 1925 he left the bank and started his own business as a stockbroker, which he practiced until Kristallnacht in 1938.

== World War II ==
After Kristallnacht in November 1938, Weltlinger was jailed for two months in the concentration camp of Sachsenhausen. From March 1939 to February 1942, he worked at the Jewish Community of Berlin and was responsible for the administration and collection of emigration and Theresienstadt home shopping duties. Non-Jewish friends and family hid Weltinger and his wife, Margaret, until the end of the war in their Berlin half-room apartment.

After a first job as assistant to the Magistrates for Jewish Affairs in 1946, Weltlinger joined the CDU. In November 1949, he was among the founding members of the Society for Christian-Jewish Cooperation in Berlin and was chairman until 1970. From 1959 to 1967, he was a member of the Berlin House of Representatives and became senior member of the House. In 1961, he was awarded the title of a town elder. Weltlinger died in Berlin in 1974 and was buried in an honorary grave in the cemetery of the Jewish community in Berlin on the highway.

Towards the very end of his life, he was interviewed in the now famous documentary series, The World at War. He died a few months after the interview at the age of 88.

=== Honours ===
- 1966: Great Cross of Merit of the Federal Republic of Germany
- 1971: Ernst-Reuter-plaque
- Honorary grave in the cemetery of the Jewish Community of Berlin, Heerstraße
