= Richard Böck =

SS guard at Auschwitz (born 1906)

Richard Böck (born 1906) was an SS guard at the Auschwitz Concentration Camp. After the Second World War, he was among the few former SS members who openly testified about the mass killings there, serving as a witness against chief SS perpetrators at the Frankfurt Auschwitz trials in 1964. Böck stated that he had joined the SS in 1934 only to be able to continue playing music in a marching band. At Auschwitz he was an SS-Unterscharführer employed as a driver in the motor pool. Böck reported that he was once commanded to drive victims who could no longer walk from the selection ramp to the gas chambers, but that he then declared he was unable to do that kind of task and was subsequently assigned other work away from the actual killings. He also described how, on another occasion, he had an opportunity to witness a mass killing in the gas chambers directly, expressing his horror at seeing the pile of dead bodies when the doors of the gas chamber were reopened. Böck later repeated his testimony in interviews for the British TV documentary The World at War in 1972.
