= Noble Frankland =

English historian (1922–2019)

Noble Frankland CB CBE DFC
- Born: Anthony Noble Frankland; 4 July 1922; Westmorland, England
- Died: 31 October 2019 (aged 97)
- Education: Trinity College, Oxford

Anthony Noble Frankland CB CBE DFC (4 July 1922 – 31 October 2019) was an English historian who served as Director General of the Imperial War Museum.

== Education ==
Frankland attended Trinity College, Oxford, from March 1941 to May 1942 and from October 1945 to November 1947.

== World War II service ==
He served in the Royal Air Force (RAF) from 1941 to 1945 as a navigator in RAF Bomber Command and was awarded the Distinguished Flying Cross (DFC) in 1944. He left the RAF in 1945 with the rank of Flight Lieutenant. Subsequently, he was awarded Chevalier of the Legion of Honour for his involvement in the liberation of France in 1944.

== Post-war career ==
From 1948 until 1951, he worked at the Air Historical Branch of the Air Ministry and received his DPhil from Oxford in April 1951. He was an Official Military Historian to the Cabinet Office between 1951 and 1958. During this time, he and his co-author, Sir Charles Webster, wrote a four-volume official history of the RAF's strategic air offensive against Germany. This was part of the official History of the Second World War series. In 1963, he was invited to give the Lees Knowles Lecture and lectured on The Strategic Air Offensive.

From 1958 to 1960, he was deputy director of studies at the Royal Institute of International Affairs. He left to become Director of the Imperial War Museum (IWM), a post he held from 1960 to 1982. As Director of the IWM, he transformed it from a failing institution into one of the world's leading historical centres for studying the conflicts of the 20th century. During 1971–74, he was a historical advisor to the Thames Television series The World at War (and was interviewed for the series) and completed several books on historical subjects.

Frankland was appointed a Commander of the Order of the British Empire (CBE) in the 1976 Birthday Honours and appointed Companion of the Order of the Bath (CB) in the 1983 New Year Honours.

== Bibliography ==
- Documents on International Affairs 1955-1957. 3 volumes. Oxford: University Press. (1958-60)
- The Strategic Air Offensive Against Germany 1939-1945. 4 volumes. London: Her Majesty's Stationery Office, 1961. official British history and co-authored with Sir Charles Webster.
- The Bombing Offensive Against Germany: Outlines and Perspectives. Faber & Faber, London (1965)
- Aspects of War (Imperial War Museum. (1969) ASIN B001BMRATA
- Bomber Offensive: the Devastation of Europe. MacDonald, London (1969); Ballantine, New York (1970)
- The Politics and Strategy of the Second World War (joint editor, 8 vols. 1974–78)
- Encyclopedia of 20th Century Warfare. Mitchell Beazley, London (general editor, 1989)
- Nicholas II: Crown of Tragedy, Kimber, London (1960)
- Bomber Offensive: The Devastation of Europe (Ballantine's Illustrated History of World War II. Campaign Book no. 7, 1970)
- Decisive Battles of the Twentieth Century, Sidgwick and Jackson, London (editor with Christopher Dowling 1976)
- Prince Henry, Duke of Gloucester Weidenfeld and Nicolson, London (1980)
- Witness of a Century: the Life and Times of Prince Arthur, Duke of Connaught (1850–1942) Shepheard-Walwyn, London (1993).
- History at War: The Campaigns of an Historian de la Mare, London (pbk 1998)

== Other works ==
- Noble Frankland (1981). Preface to The Imperial War Museum Duxford Handbook
- Noble Frankland (1981). Introduction to A Concise Catalogue of Paintings drawings and Sculpture of the first World War 1914–1918, Second Edition
