= William Eyton-Jones =

British naval officer

William Edward Rawlins Eyton-Jones
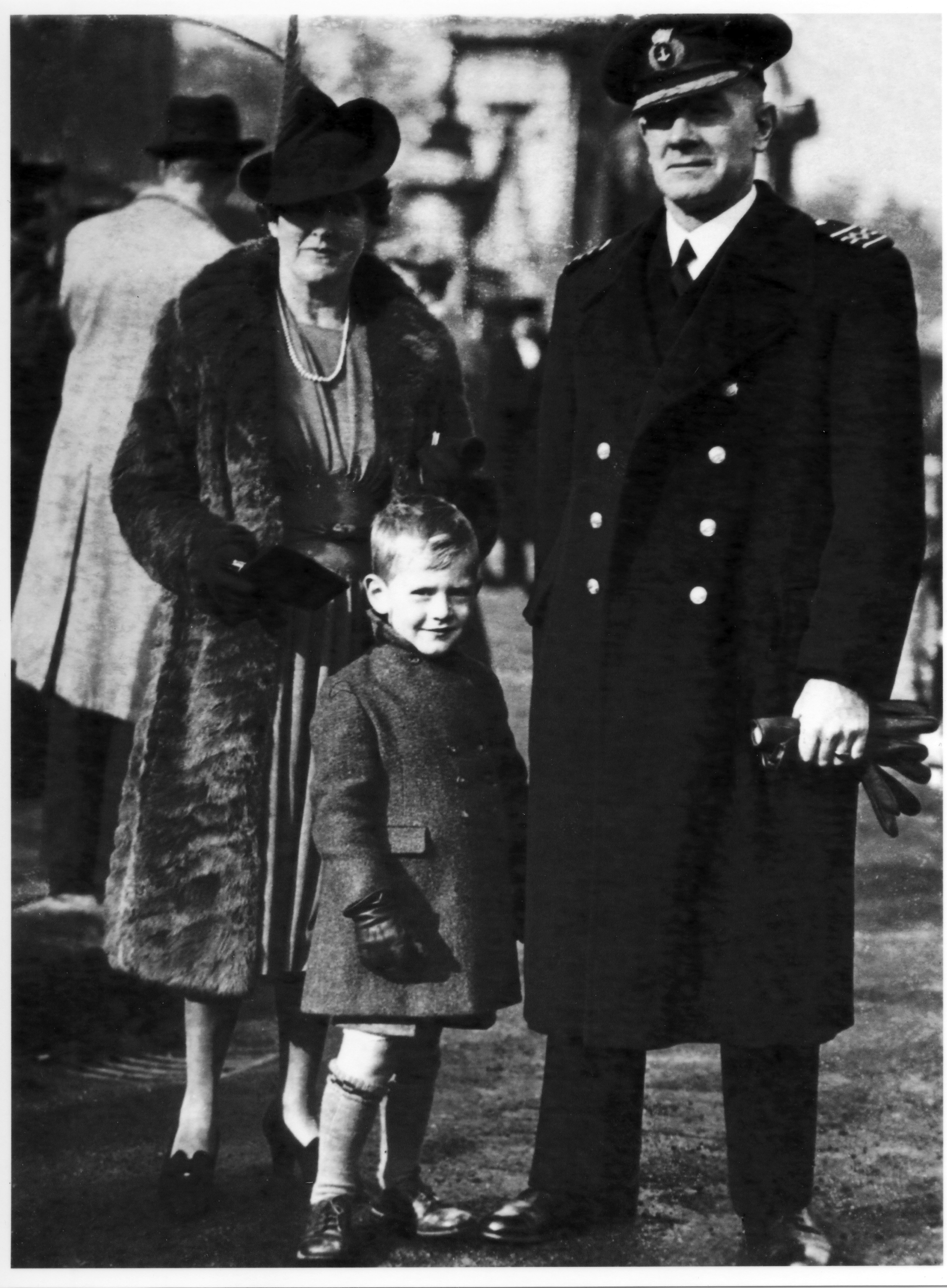
- W.E.R. Eyton-Jones at Buckingham Palace in 1942
- Born: 11 November 1894; Ash, Kent, England
- Died: 23 January 1984 (aged 89); Wirral, Cheshire, England
- Relatives: Thomas Eyton-Jones (grandfather); John Eyton-Jones (uncle); Hugh Eyton-Jones (uncle); David Eyton-Jones (cousin)
- Military career
- Allegiance: United Kingdom
- Branch: (United Kingdom) Merchant Navy
- Service years: 1909–1969
- Rank: Captain
- Nickname: 'Pop' Jones
- Conflicts: First World War; Second World War: Battle of the Atlantic; Pacific War; Italian Campaign
- Awards: OBE; Lloyd's War Medal for Bravery at Sea

Captain William Edward Rawlins Eyton-Jones, OBE (11 November 1894 – 23 January 1984), often shortened to 'Pop' Jones, was a Merchant Navy Captain and master mariner who served in various theatres during World War I and World War II, most notably in the Battle of the Atlantic.

== Early life ==
Eyton-Jones was born on 11 November 1894 in Ash, Kent, England, is a member of the Eyton-Jones family, and a nephew of Dr John Eyton-Jones.

== Career ==
During the early 1900s, Eyton-Jones trained as a junior naval officer with the Peninsular and Oriental Steam Navigation Company before joining Ben Line Steamers as a Second Officer in March 1915 at the age of 21. He spent the next few years working for Ben Line and is recorded docking at Ellis Island, New York in 1917, while serving aboard Ben Line's Bencleuch as Second Officer. On 26 November 1926, Eyton-Jones was promoted to Captain, becoming Master of Benlawers.

Eyton-Jones remained a Captain for Ben Line until his retirement in 1969 by which time he had become the Senior Master and Commodore of the Ben Line fleet.

== World War II ==
Eyton-Jones was Master of Benvrackie when, on 13 May 1941, after dispersing from Convoy OB.312, she was torpedoed by the U-boat U-105, 630 miles southwest of Freetown, Sierra Leone in the Atlantic Ocean midway between Brazil and North Africa. U-105, of the German Kriegsmarine, commanded by George Schewe, fired two torpedoes which hit the ship in holds No. 4 and No. 5 sinking it in just over two minutes.

At the time, Benvrackie was carrying 25 survivors from Lassell which had been torpedoed by U-107 on 30 April, picked up on 3 May.

Eyton-Jones went down with the ship but later came to the surface and helped survivors to some wreckage. They managed to reach the only lifeboat to get away. Thirteen crew of Benvrackie and fifteen survivors from Lassell were lost. He took charge and rescued other survivors from the sea until there were 59 survivors on board. The lifeboat was only designed to carry 38 passengers. They spent 13 days at sea in the open lifeboat and sailed over 500 miles before being rescued on 26 May 1942 by the British hospital ship HMHS Oxfordshire and landed at Freetown.

As Master of Benledi in 1942 he saw further action when on 5 April dive bombers of the Imperial Japanese Navy Air Service tried to sink the ship while she lay in harbour in Columbo, British Ceylon. First, a number of dive bombers came over as Benledi's guns opened fire on one of them. Then came a high level attack by several formations of seven planes each. The third formation came straight for Benledi dropping seven bombs at the ship. The first fell just outside the boom, the second hit and wrecked a nearby navy destroyer, the third struck the vessels poop, and the fourth hit the quay side. The ship was on fire and Eyton-Jones, knowing that the magazine, which was situated in the poop, contained enough explosives to blow the whole stern away, and that under the poop were 70 tonnes of 250 pound incendiary bombs, ordered "Clear ship - everyone ashore". The crew managed to fight the fires and within 30 minutes the fire was under control. Before this incident Benledi had on a number of occasions been attacked by other Japanese aircraft as well as by the German Luftwaffe.

During 1943 he was seconded to North America for nine months acting as planning and liaison officer for Ben Line and other shipping companies.

In 1973, he was interviewed as part of the Thames Television documentary, The World at War, where he recalled his involvement in the Battle of the Atlantic.

== Honours and awards ==
Eyton-Jones received a number of honours and awards for his service during World War I and World War II. The most notable were the OBE, which he received from King George VI at Buckingham Palace on 3 February 1942, and the Lloyd's Medal for Bravery at Sea.

Ribbon	Name	Date awarded
	Officer of the Order of the British Empire	1942
	British Mercantile Marine Medal	1919
	British War Medal	1919
	1939–1945 Star	1943
	Atlantic Star	1945
	Pacific Star	1945
	Italy Star	1945
	War Medal 1939–1945	1945
	Lloyd's War Medal for Bravery at Sea	1941
