= Rüdiger Schleicher =

German resistance member

Ruediger Schleicher

Rüdiger Schleicher (14 January 1895 – 23 April 1945) was a German legal academic and resistance fighter against the Nazi régime.

== Life ==
Born in Stuttgart, Württemberg, Schleicher was married to Ursula Bonhoeffer (1902–1983), Karl Bonhoeffer's daughter and Dietrich and Klaus Bonhoeffer's sister. His daughter Renate married Dietrich Bonhoeffer's friend and fellow theologian, Eberhard Bethge. Schleicher studied law in Tübingen and obtained his doctorate in 1923 with a dissertation on "International Air Travel Law."

After working in the Württemberg government service and the German-American Arbitration Committee at the Foreign Office in Berlin, he became an official in the Reich Ministry of Transport in 1927. Upon the Nazi seizure of power in 1933, he was posted to the newly established Ministry of Aviation under Hermann Göring. There, beginning in 1935, he headed the legal department as a ministerial adviser.

On 14 August 1939, less than three weeks before the war broke out, Schleicher was removed as leader of the legal department and given a job as a consultant in the General Air Office. His advocacy, in publications and presentations, of international law, the war renunciation pact (Kellogg-Briand Pact, 1928), and the Hague Conventions did not sit well with the government. In 1939, as an added responsibility, Schleicher took on the leadership of the Institute for Aviation Law at the Frederick William University of Berlin and the publication of the magazine Archiv für Luftrecht. The institute was later used for conspiratorial resistance meetings.

In the event that the revolt against Adolf Hitler on 20 July 1944 was successfully accomplished, Schleicher was to be responsible for the reorganization of air travel. After the plot to assassinate the Führer at the Wolf's Lair in East Prussia failed, Schleicher explained during interrogation that he opposed the Nazi régime. To bring about reconciliation with Western war opponents, he said, Hitler had to step down.

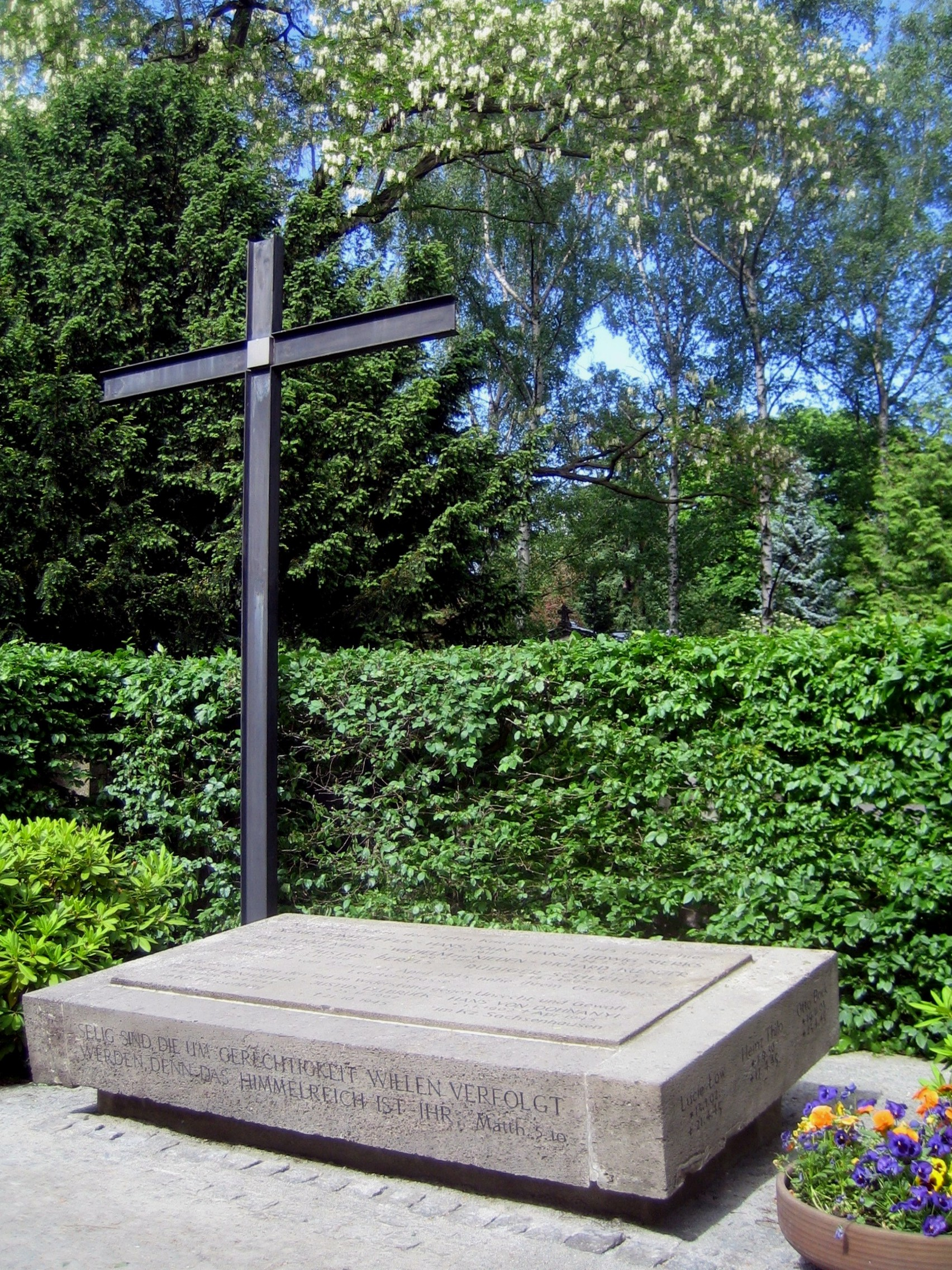
Rüdiger Schleicher's grave in the Dorotheenstadt cemetery

On 2 February 1945, Schleicher was sentenced to death by the People's Court (Volksgerichtshof). The presiding judge was Roland Freisler, who was killed in a US air raid the very next day. After several months in Gestapo custody, Rüdiger Schleicher was shot on the night of 22–23 April, along with twelve fellow prisoners, among them his own brother-in-law Klaus Bonhoeffer and his assistant Hans John, by a special Reich Security Main Office squad on the former exhibition grounds near Lehrter Straße prison in Moabit, as Red Army troops were already entering Berlin.

Schleicher's commentary on the German Air Traffic Law (Luftverkehrsgesetz, 1. Aufl. 1933, 2. Aufl. 1937) was continued after his death (Schleicher/Reymann/Abraham, Das Recht der Luftfahrt, 3. Aufl. 1960/1966).

== Literature ==
- Bracher, Karl Dietrich: Geschichte als Erfahrung. Betrachtungen zum 20. Jahrhundert; Stuttgart u.a. 2001; ISBN 978-3-421-05444-9 (Bracher is – like Eberhard Bethge – Rüdiger Schleicher's son-in-law. In this work, which brings together many of Bracher's essays, is a short biography of Schleicher.)
