= Klaus Bonhoeffer =

German jurist and resistance fighter (1901–1945)

Klaus Bonhoeffer

Klaus Bonhoeffer (5 January 1901 – 23 April 1945) was a German jurist and resistance fighter against the Nazi régime who was executed after the July 1944 plot to kill Hitler.

== Early life ==
Klaus Bonhoeffer was born in Breslau, Germany, now Wrocław, Poland, to Karl Bonhoeffer, a professor of psychiatry and neurology, and his wife Paula (née von Hase), as the third son in the Bonhoeffer family. His younger brother was the theologian Dietrich Bonhoeffer (4 February 1906 – 9 April 1945).

== Education ==
As a child, he went to the Friedrichswerdersche Gymnasium in Berlin. He studied law at the University of Tübingen, Heidelberg University, and the Frederick William University of Berlin. In 1925, he earned a doctorate in law (Dr. jur.) from Heidelberg University with a dissertation entitled "Workers' Committees as an Organ of the Workers' Coöperative" (Die Betriebsräte als Organ der Betriebsgenossenschaft). He also underwent further training in Berlin, Geneva, and Amsterdam.

== Marriage ==
On 3 September 1930, he wed Emmi Delbrück, who was Hans Delbrück's daughter, and Justus and Max Delbrück's sister.

== Career ==
He worked as a lawyer and from 1935 as a legal adviser for Deutsche Luft Hansa, serving from 1937 to 1944 as chief syndic. This job took him on many business trips, even during the war.

== World War II and death ==
In the years 1940–1944, he systematically established contacts with various resistance groups working against the Nazi régime. Through his brother Dietrich, he had contacts with the church resistance, and through his brothers-in-law, Justus Delbrück, Hans von Dohnanyi and Rüdiger Schleicher, he had many contacts in the military resistance to Hitler, especially in the circle about Wilhelm Canaris in the Abwehr of the Oberkommando der Wehrmacht.

Through his wife's cousin Ernst von Harnack, he was connected to the social-democratic resistance. Klaus Bonhoeffer also led his colleague Otto John, among others, into the resistance. He used his travel opportunities to further the cause against the Nazis. He was dedicated to the plan to assassinate Hitler on 20 July 1944 and overthrow the government.

According to the detention book kept at the Lehrter Straße prison in Berlin, where the Gestapo had a special section for political prisoners, Bonhoeffer was arrested on 1 October 1944 and sentenced to death by the German "People's Court" (Volksgerichtshof) on 2 February 1945.

On the night of 22–23 April 1945, as Soviet troops were already reaching Berlin's eastern outskirts, he along with Rüdiger Schleicher and other prisoners was taken by a special squad from the RSHA to the exhibition grounds near the Lehrter Straße prison and killed with a gunshot wound to the neck. The only eyewitness to these murders was Herbert Kosney, who managed to move his head at the last moment so that the shot meant for his neck missed.

His wife and children survived the war and settled in Schleswig-Holstein.

A memorial stone has been established at his family home.

== See also ==
- List of members of the 20 July plot
- German resistance to Nazism
- Ernst Ludwig Heuss (de)
- Emmi Bonhoeffer
