= Siegfried Westphal =

German general (1902-1982)

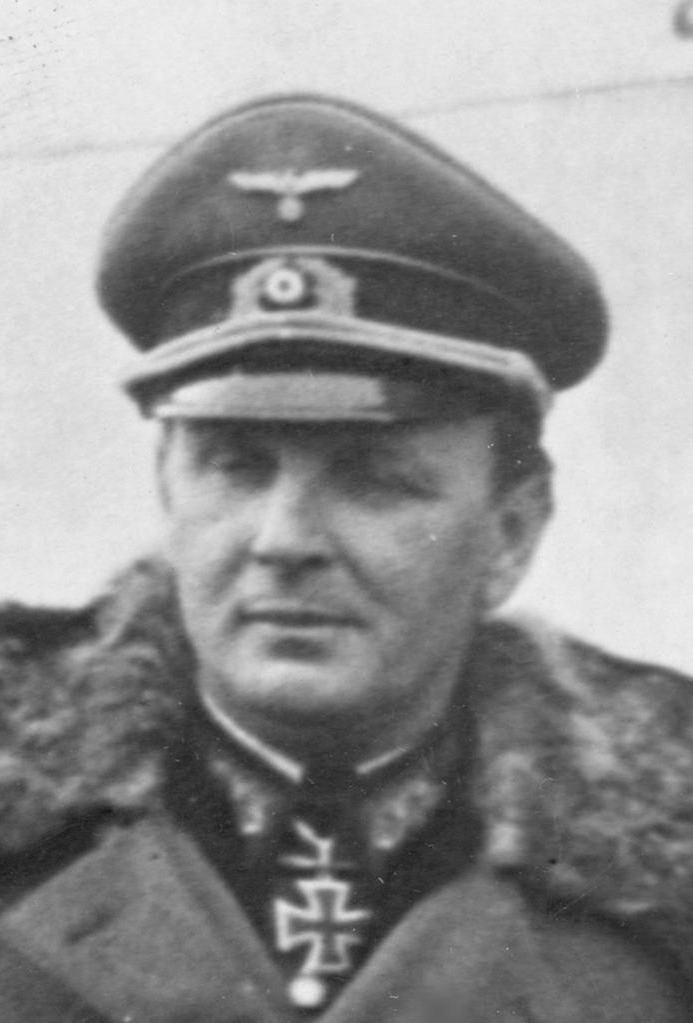
- Born: 18 March 1902; Leipzig, German Empire
- Died: 2 July 1982 (aged 80); Celle, West Germany
- Military career
- Allegiance: Weimar Republic; Nazi Germany
- Branch: German Army
- Service years: 1918–1945
- Rank: General der Kavallerie
- Conflicts: World War I; World War II; Battle of France; North African Campaign; Italian Campaign
- Awards: Knight's Cross of the Iron Cross

Siegfried Carl Theodor Westphal (18 March 1902 – 2 July 1982) was a German general in the Wehrmacht during World War II.

Upon the outbreak of the war, Westphal, then a major, served as the operations officer 58th Infantry Division.

In 1941, he was promoted to Oberstleutnant and attached to the staff of Erwin Rommel in June of that year. He served as operations officer under Rommel and chief of staff under Kesselring and Rundstedt. He was a recipient of the Knight's Cross of the Iron Cross of Nazi Germany.

Westphal surrendered to the American troops in May 1945 and acted as a witness at the Nuremberg Trials. He was released in 1947. He wrote a book titled The German Army in the West, which was published in 1952. He appears in a number of interview segments of The World at War.

== Awards and decorations ==
- Knight's Cross of the Iron Cross on 29 November 1942 as Oberst i.G. and Chef des Generalstabes of Deutsch-Italienische Panzerarmee

== Bibliography ==
- Fellgiebel, Walther-Peer (2000) [1986]. Die Träger des Ritterkreuzes des Eisernen Kreuzes 1939–1945—Die Inhaber der höchsten Auszeichnung des Zweiten Weltkrieges aller Wehrmachtteile [The Bearers of the Knight's Cross of the Iron Cross 1939–1945—The Owners of the Highest Award of the Second World War of all Wehrmacht Branches] (in German). Friedberg, Germany: Podzun-Pallas. ISBN 978-3-7909-0284-6.

Military offices
Preceded by Formed from Oberbefehlshabers Süd	Chief of the General Staff of Heeresgruppe C 26 November 1943 – 9 September 1944	Succeeded by General der Panzertruppe Hans Röttiger
Preceded by General der Infanterie Günther Blumentritt	Chief of the General Staff of Oberbefehlshaber West; 10 September 1944 – 22 April 1945	Succeeded by None
