= Mayor of Wrexham =

Position in Wrexham County Borough Council

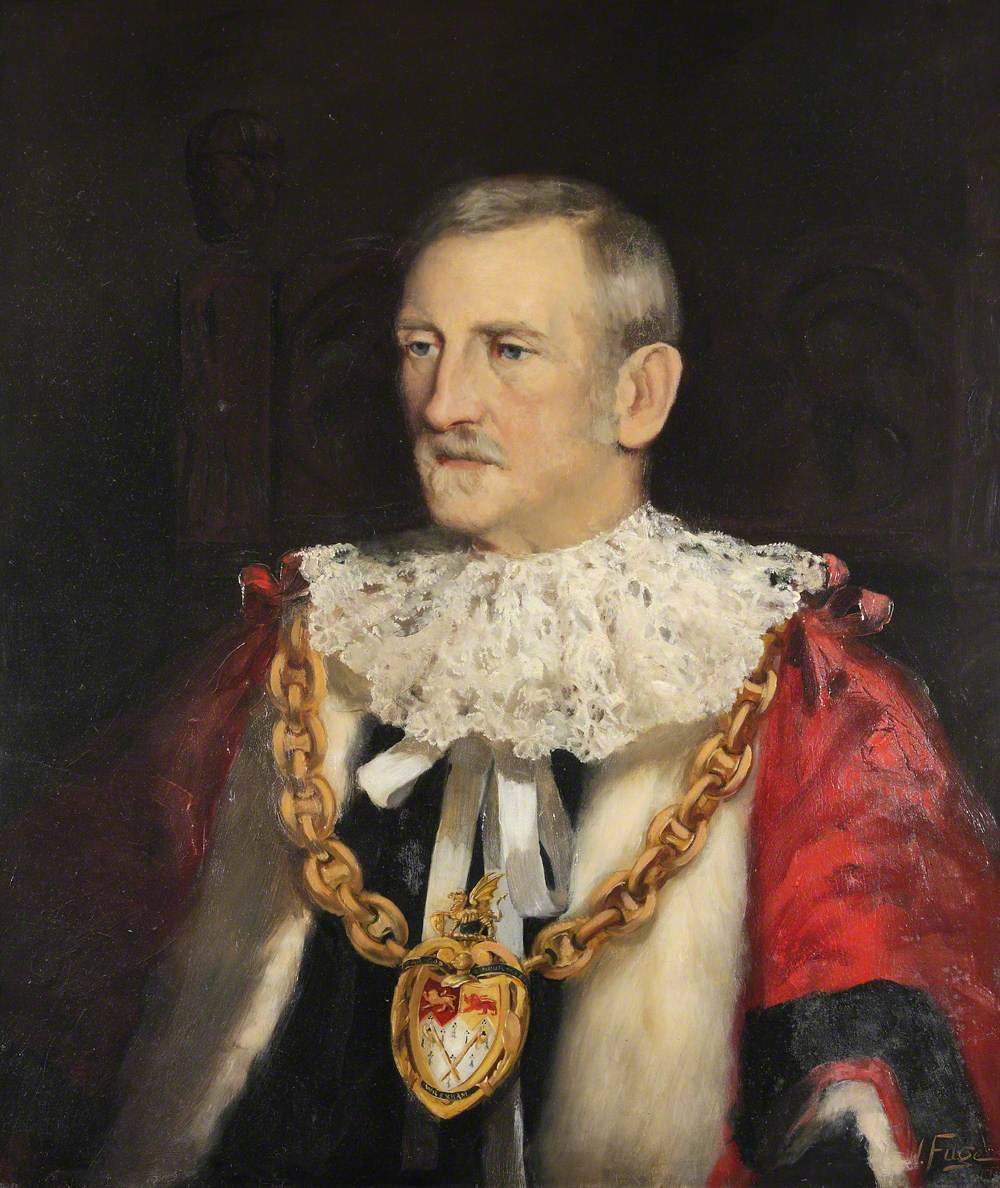
Philip Yorke II (1849-1922), as Mayor of Wrexham

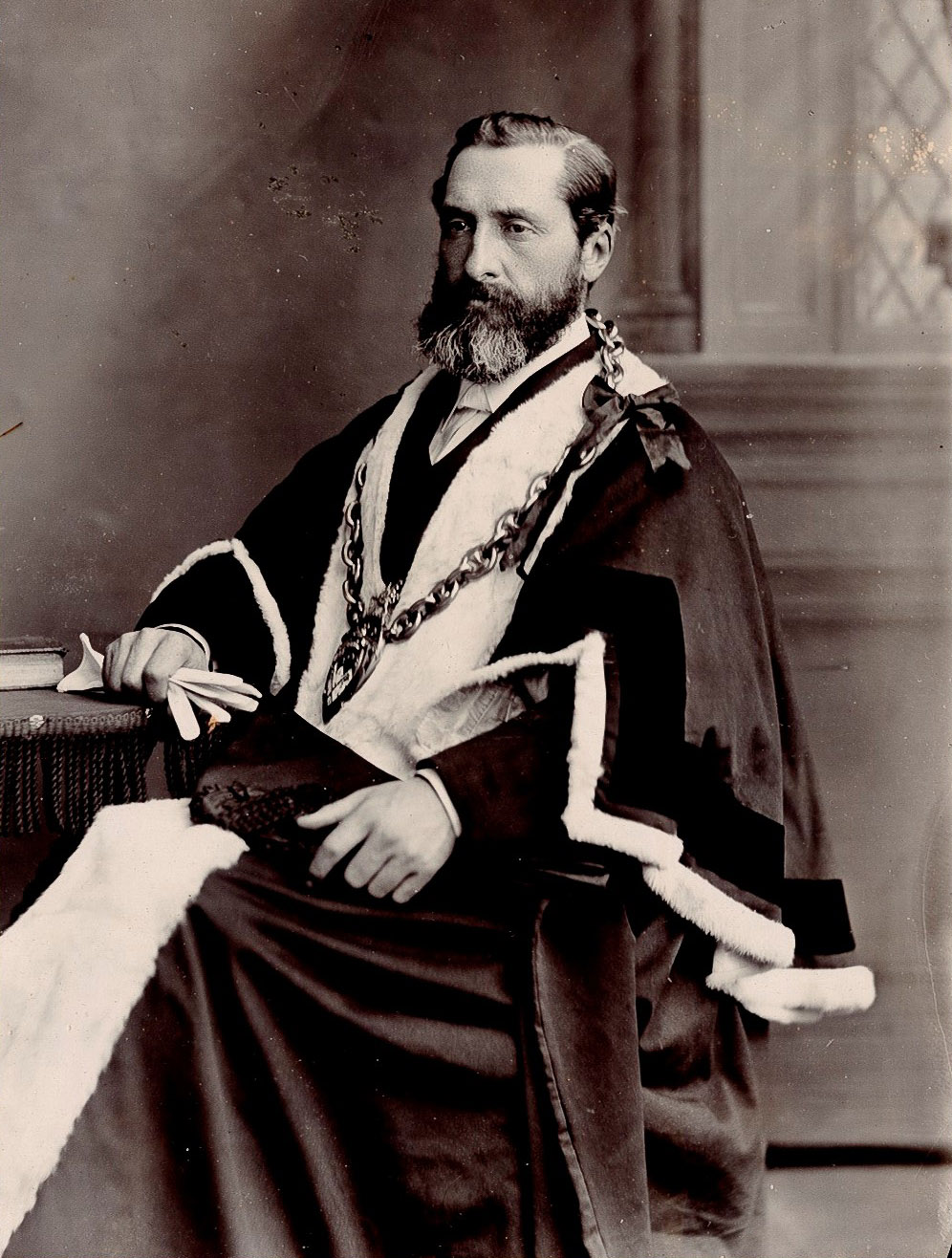
Dr Thomas Eyton-Jones, Mayor of Wrexham, 1875.

The mayor of Wrexham is the civic figurehead and first citizen of the city and county borough of Wrexham in the north of Wales. It was established in 1857, upon the granting of a Charter of Incorporation to the town of Wrexham, resulting in the establishment of a borough and borough council.

The position is now elected by members of Wrexham County Borough Council at their annual meeting, and today, holders of the position conventionally serve a one-year term. The position is currently held by Councillor Jeremy Kent of Gresford East/West for the 2026/2027 term.

== Background ==
Before the establishment of the position in 1857, the then town of Wrexham was largely administered by the manorial courts of the gentry and parish Vestry. The manorial courts became overwhelmed with the increasing local government responsibilities placed on them, with the Vestry increasingly adding secular matters to their originally religious operations to compensate the manorial courts.

By 1848, concerns over the system of various local government in managing the growing town's sanitary conditions, in particular the public health threat of cholera, led to locals launching a petition to the Privy Council in February 1857 for the town to be incorporated. On 23 September 1857, the town was granted a Charter of Incorporation, spanning the two townships of the town, Wrexham Abbot and Wrexham Regis, as well as part of Esclusham Below. This charter lead to the forming of the borough of Wrexham, with a borough council (a corporation) and a position of mayor under the terms of the Municipal Corporations Act 1835. The position of mayor of the borough of Wrexham was first occupied by Thomas Edgworth. In 1974, the post of Mayor of Wrexham Borough Council, was superseded by Mayor of Wrexham Maelor Borough Council within Clwyd. Clwyd itself was abolished in 1996, following the enactment of the Local Government (Wales) Act 1994, with the position transferred to the newly established Wrexham County Borough Council, the council of the newly formed Wrexham County Borough.

The mayor wears the "Mayor's Chain", dating to 1872. There are equivalent chains for the Mayoress, Deputy Mayor, and Deputy Mayoress. A Ceremonial mace is carried in front of the mayor in civic proceedings, and dates back to 1866.

Wrexham became a city in September 2022.

== Appointment ==
The Mayor of Wrexham, as well as the Deputy Mayor of Wrexham, is elected by members of Wrexham County Borough Council at their annual meeting. Presently, the position is usually held for one year for the appointed councillor, although past mayors have held the post for more than two years.

== Role ==
The mayor is the First Citizen of Wrexham County Borough and a figurehead for the council. Their position is to represent the entire county borough, acting as a link between the council and citizens, and symbolically represent continuity, an open society (by elected irrespective of class, gender, or ethnicity), and a figure in times of crisis, tragedy or triumph.

Administratively, the mayor presides over council meetings and at civic functions, and acts as a tiebreaker in the event of equal votes in the council. They have precedence at any function within the county borough, including over government ministers, MPs and MSs, but except in the presence of the Monarch, British royal family, or the Lord Lieutenant of Clwyd.

During their one-year term, the mayor is expected to contribute to five formal civic events through the year. The five events being; the council's annual meeting, civic visit to Church, Royal Welch Fusiliers Reunion Weekend, a charity ball, and the annual remembrance service. Outside these more formal events, the mayor is expected to be attending 400 other engagements.

Each mayor nominates a charity or charities to receive funds that have been fundraised during their term. The mayor may also request donations to other causes.

== Heraldry ==
The Wrexham County Borough Coat of arms is inherited from Wrexham Maelor, which is itself derived from the two authorities preceding Wrexham Maelor, the borough of Wrexham and Wrexham Rural District.

== List of mayors ==
The current mayor for the 2026/2027 term is Councillor Jeremy Kent of Gresford East/West since 19 May 2026, with Jeremy Newton of Bronington and Hanmer as deputy. Kent is also the first Conservative in the role in 24 years, since 2003. Previous deputy mayors are usually promoted to mayor the following year by convention in Wrexham, however the 2022/2023 deputy mayor was suspended and withdrew their candidacy to serve as mayor for the following term.

A list of the mayors of Wrexham County Borough Council and its predecessor councils is present on the council's website.

== See also ==
- Mayors in Wales
