= Thomas Eyton-Jones =

Welsh physician

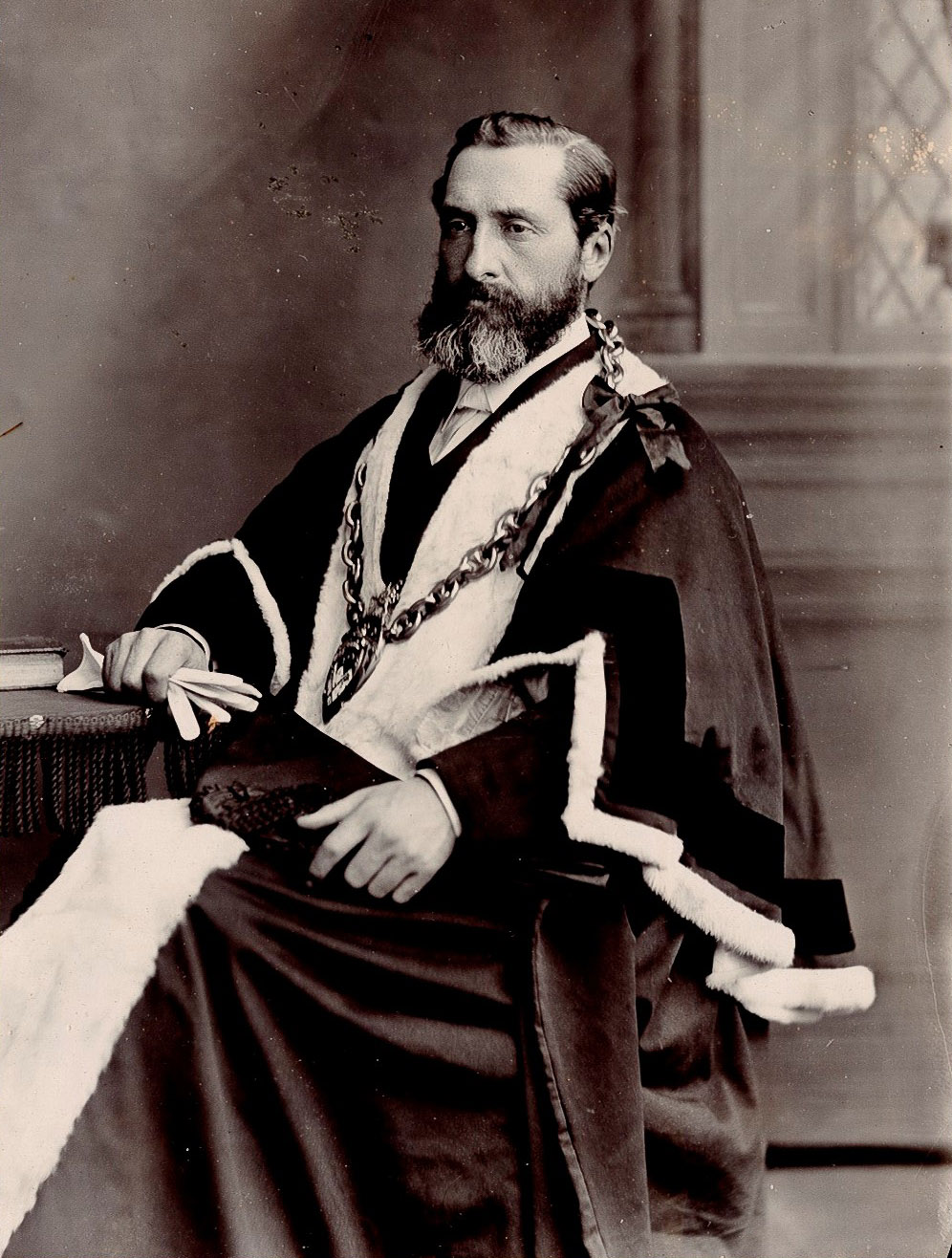
- Born: 20 March 1832; Llangar, Merionethshire, Wales
- Died: 11 February 1893 (aged 60); Pau, France
- Military career
- Relatives: Hugh Mortimer Eyton-Jones (son); John Eyton-Jones (son); William Eyton-Jones (grandson); David Eyton-Jones (great grandson)
- Allegiance: United Kingdom
- Branch: (United Kingdom) British Army
- Rank: Surgeon-Major
- Unit: Denbigshire Hussars Regiment

Thomas Eyton-Jones JP, FRCS (baptised 20 March 1832 – 13 February 1893), was a significant figure in Wrexham in the 19th century. Working as a surgeon, physician, magistrate, local politician and army officer, he is best known for his role as a medical professional.

== Ancestry ==
Eyton-Jones descended paternally from the Jones family of Tir Llanerch in Carrog, near Corwen and maternally from the Eytons of Craig Ddu in Llantysilio, near Llangollen. Born at Plas Isaf in Llangar, near Corwen, Merionethshire in 1832, Welsh speaking Eyton-Jones moved to Wrexham in 1848.

== Early career ==
Eyton Jones received his professional education from the well known Dr. Thomas Taylor Griffiths of Wrexham. In 1853 he moved to London to train at St. Bartholomew's Hospital where in 1855 he gained 1st Prize in Midwifery, and in 1856 1st Prize in Surgery. In 1856 he became a Member of the Royal College of Surgeons, a Licentiate of the Society of Apothecaries and a Licentiate of Midwifery. After studying in Paris he returned to Wrexham and joined Dr. Griffiths in practice.

== Professional Roles ==
He was actively involved with the British Medical Association throughout his career, acting as Secretary to the North Wales Branch where he was appointed President twice, in 1867 and in 1886, also attending meetings of the BMA General Council as a representative of the North Wales Branch. In addition he was appointed a surgeon to the Wrexham Infirmary in 1859, a Fellow of the Obstetrical Society in 1872, a Fellow of the Royal College of Surgeons in Edinburgh in 1875, a Doctor of Medicine from St. Andrew's University, Scotland, also in 1875. He was appointed Governor of University College, North Wales, president of the Chester and North Wales Medical Society from 1888 to 1889.

His political and legal involvement included being elected a Wrexham Borough Councillor in 1864 and Chairman of the Sanitary Committee. In 1859 he was appointed Governor of the Ragged Schools, a Justice of the Peace in 1867, Poor Law Guardian of the Wrexhan Union in 1873, and President of the Corwen Eisteddfod in 1874. In 1875 he was elected Mayor of Wrexham, a year when the town hosted the National Eisteddfod.

Dr. Eyton-Jones was a Freemason for most of his life. He was a member of the Cestrain Lodge (No. 425) in Chester and in 1871 became one of the founding members of the Square and Compass Lodge (No. 1336) in Wrexham.

== Personal life ==
Eyton-Jones married twice, firstly in 1860 to Susannah Maurice. They had five children, Thomas, John Arthur, Hugh Mortimer, Clarence Paget and Mabel Winifred. Susannah died in 1870 aged 32. He married again in 1871 to Sarah Anne Long and raised another child, Annie Myfanwy. In 1892 the couple moved to Pau in South West France to retire. They both died after only a year and were buried together at Pau Cemetery.

== Publications ==
Eyton-Jones authored the following essays:

- "An Essay on the Therapeutical Value of the Indian Bael Fruit in Dysentery" (1856)
- "Addresses on Medical Progress"
- "Cases of Impaction in Nares and Bronchus" (BMA Journal - 1869)
- "On the True Value of Ergot" (BMA Journal - 1873)
- "Against Honorary Medical Services" (BMA Journal - 1891)
