= Oberbefehlshaber Süd =

High-ranking position in the Luftwaffe (air force of Nazi Germany)

The Commander in Chief South (German: Oberbefehlshaber Süd; initials OB Süd) was a high-ranking position in the Luftwaffe of Nazi Germany. All Luftwaffe units based in the Mediterranean and North African theatres of World War II fell under this command.

The command was subordinate to the Comando Supremo, the Italian high command. OB Süd was also the commander of Luftflotte 2.

After the Armistice of Cassibile, the position of Oberbefehlshaber Süd was superseded on 16 November 1943 by Oberbefehlshaber Südwest, which remained to be Albert Kesselring.

== Commanding officers ==
No.	Portrait	Name	Took office	Left office	Time in office
1	Albert Kesselring	Generalfeldmarschall; Albert Kesselring (1885–1960)	2 December 1941	16 November 1943	1 year, 349 days

=== Chiefs of Staff ===
No.	Portrait	Name	Took office	Left office	Time in office
1	Hans Seidemann	Oberst; Hans Seidemann (1901–1967)	2 December 1941	31 July 1942	241 days
2	Paul Deichmann	Generalmajor; Paul Deichmann (1898–1981)	25 August 1942	12 June 1943	291 days
3	Siegfried Westphal	Generalmajor; Siegfried Westphal (1902–1982)	15 June 1943	16 November 1943	154 days

=== Operations Officers (Ia) ===
No.	Portrait	Name	Took office	Left office	Time in office
1	Siegfried Westphal	Generalmajor; Siegfried Westphal (1902–1982)	1 February 1943	15 June 1943	134 days

== Sources ==
- Axis History
- Albert Kesselring by Pier Paolo Battistelli, page 12
