= André Beaufre =

French general and military strategist

- Beaufre in 1972 being interviewed in The World at War
- Born: 25 January 1902; Neuilly-sur-Seine, France
- Died: 13 February 1975 (aged 73); Belgrade, Yugoslavia
- Military career
- Allegiance: France
- Branch: French Army
- Service years: 1921–1961
- Rank: Général d'Armée
- Conflicts: Rif War; World War II: Battle of France; First Indochina War; Suez Crisis; Algerian War
- Awards: Grand Cross of the Legion of Honour (1973)

André Beaufre (French pronunciation: [ɑ̃dʁe bofʁ]; 25 January 1902 – 13 February 1975) was a French Army officer and military strategist who attained the rank of général d'armée (Army General) before his retirement in 1961. He was made a Grand Cross of the Legion of Honour in 1973.

He was born in Neuilly-sur-Seine and entered the military academy at École Spéciale Militaire de Saint-Cyr in 1921, where he met the future French president Charles de Gaulle, who was an instructor. In 1925 he saw action in Morocco against the Rif, who opposed French rule. Beaufre then studied at the École Supérieure de Guerre and at the École Libre des Sciences Politiques and was subsequently assigned to the French army's general staff.

By the end of World War II, he had attained the rank of colonel and was well known in the English-speaking world as a military strategist and as an exponent of an independent French nuclear force. He commanded the French forces in the 1956 Suez War campaign against Egypt in 1956. Beaufre later became chief of the general staff of the Supreme Headquarters, Allied Powers in Europe in 1958. He was serving as chief French representative to the permanent group of the North Atlantic Treaty Organization (NATO) in Washington in 1960 when he was promoted to général d'armée. Beaufre retired from the Army in 1961 for health reasons. He died in 1975 while engaged in a series of lectures in Yugoslavia.

== Military career ==
=== World War II ===
While serving as permanent secretary of national defence in Algeria in 1940–41 during World War II, he was arrested by the French Vichy regime, and after his release in 1942 he served in the Free French Army on several fronts until the end of the war in 1945.

In his book 1940: The Fall of France, Beaufre writes: "The collapse of the French Army is the most important event of the 20th century". He states that had the French Army held, the Hitler regime would have almost certainly fallen. There would have been no Nazi conquest of Western Europe, no Nazi assault on the Soviet Union, no Holocaust, most likely no Communist takeover of Eastern Europe. He later gave his views on France's fall during interviews for the now famous production by Thames Television, The World at War, Episode 3

=== Indochina ===
French Indochina, 1952, General Beaufre was the leader of the group for NATO tactical studies. He was considering a structure of small buried defensive positions for protection against nuclear strike – they were called the shield (‘bouclier’). In order to intervene in the vast vacant spaces he was suggesting using very light and mobile troops equipped with nuclear cannons. His thesis was taking place in a very uncertain world where both parties were potentially thinking about using nuclear weapons.

=== Algeria ===
Beaufre was a general in the Algerian War. He was leading the Iron Division (la division de fer). Freshly coming from Indochina and poorly informed about the popular and national character of this new conflict, the troops had been struck hard by Krim Belkacem’s partisans. He argued in his book Introduction to Strategy for the dissolution of the boundaries between military and civil society; a military approach that acknowledged the existence of an extended battlefield. In Beaufre's theory, the battlefield must be extended to encompass all aspects of a civil society, particularly social and ideological spheres, such as the radio and the classroom. According to Beaufre, the proper concern of the military should be extended to co-ordinating all aspects of a civil society.

== South Africa ==
General André Beaufre is the originator of the term "Total Strategy". A multi-component strategy developed by the security establishment, drawing upon the experience of other countries in counter-revolutionary warfare and low-intensity conflict, and refining and adding to such techniques within the South African context. As a theorist, he features prominently in the more intellectual of the SADF training courses. According to Philip Frankel (an internationally renowned expert in civil-military studies), who has conducted the most comprehensive study of the development of the SADF's "Total Strategy", virtually every course at the Joint Defence College is based on one or other of Beaufre strategic works. This concept also found its way into the management of water resources flowing in rivers that cross international political borders, specifically in South Africa.

== Influence on deterrence theory ==
=== Nuclear deterrence ===
During the early 1960s Beaufre came to prominence as a theoretical military strategist and as an advocate of the independent French nuclear force, which was a major priority of President Charles de Gaulle. Beaufre remained on good terms with the U.S. authorities who opposed Nuclear proliferation but argued that French nuclear independence would give the West greater unpredictability vis-à-vis the Soviet Union and thus strengthen the deterrent capacity of the NATO alliance.

At the same time Beaufre published "An Introduction to Strategy" and later "Deterrence and Strategy". His insight greatly influenced deterrence-theory analysis within international-relations circles. Military historians characterized "An Introduction to Strategy" as the most complete strategy treatise published in that generation. The Vatican analyzed the papers extensively at the fourth session of Vatican Council II in 1966 and later commented on them in the "Pastoral Constitution on the Church in the Modern World."

Beaufre defined nuclear deterrence as the only kind of deterrence that produces the effect seeks to avoid or to end war.

Beaufre developed "Deterrence and Strategy" in the context of the bipolar world of the Cold War where the threat of nuclear war was effective. The existence of this threat caused a psychological result and prevented adversaries from taking up arms. Adversaries had to measure the risk they were running if they unleashed a crisis, because the response would have produced political, economic, social, and moral damage from which recovery wouldn't have been easy; material damage and psychological factors played a decisive role in deterrence.

Beaufre believed that military action should be avoided in a nuclear scenario and that victory should be won by paralyzing the adversary through indirect action. It is not simply a matter of terrifying the enemy; it is also a matter of hiding one's own fear by executing those actions that show the opposite. This equilibrium-through-terror axiom ruled during the Cold War and prevented a nuclear confrontation between the United States and the Soviet Union.

For Beaufre, deterrence was above all the threat of nuclear war. The atomic threat guaranteed peace better than conventional arms did. Of course Beaufre saw the problem principally from the French strategic viewpoint. He was not convinced by conventional deterrence: "The classical arms race creates instability, just as the nuclear race creates stability."

Beaufre's thesis, that the threat of using atomic weapons is the only means for worldwide stabilization, is pessimistic. His pessimism lies in the contradictions between nuclear and conventional deterrence. When one party develops greater offensive capability than another, instability results.

Victory in a conventional war is unilateral; in a nuclear war, destruction is bilateral. The simple expectation of success by one party can unleash aggression in his adversary. Beaufre develops this idea in more detail in a theory called "the dialectic of the expectations of victory."

=== Classical deterrence ===
Beaufre's thought is not restricted to a defence of nuclear deterrence. Elsewhere in his treatise he reflects on the possibility of combining nuclear deterrence with conventional deterrence. He summarizes his concept in this manner: "The nuclear and classical levels tied to each other, essentially with classic atomic weapons, brings to the latter the stability it lacks and returns to the former the elemental risk of instability that it needs in order to continue its role as the great stabilizer."

Beaufre is saying that nuclear and conventional deterrence are "Siamese twins" because the instability the conventional mode provokes makes nuclear deterrence necessary, precisely in order to obtain stability. In sum, true deterrence is obtained only through nuclear deterrence.

== Quotes ==
- "We suffered from an illness which is not peculiar to the French - the illness of having been victorious."
- "The collapse of the French Army is the most important event of the 20th century."
- "Throughout the entire course of history, warfare is always changing."
- "No explanation for the current strategic situation is satisfactory without a definition of the nuclear situation; no definition of the nuclear situation is possible without knowledge of the laws that rule deterrence."
- "The game of strategy can, like music, be played in two keys. The major key is direct strategy, in which force is the essential factor. The minor key is indirect strategy, in which force recedes into the background and its place is taken by psychology and planning."
- "A South African policy which does not disarm (the opposition to apartheid from the Third World)... by some well conceived reforms and by a big information effort, risks allowing a hostile atmosphere to build up and to harden."
- "Victory is a very dangerous opportunity."

== Works ==
- Introduction to Strategy (New York: Praeger, 1965 [Introduction à la stratégie, Paris, 1963])
- Deterrence and Strategy (London: Faber, 1965 [Dissuasion et stratégie Paris, Armand Colin, 1964])
- NATO and Europe (1966 [L'O.T.A.N. et l'Europe ])
- 1940: The Fall of France (London: Cassell, 1967 [Le Drame de 1940] )
- Mémoires 1920–1940–1945 (1969);
- The Suez Expedition 1956 (English Translation, Faber & Faber 1969)
- La guerre révolutionnaire... (Paris : Fayard, 1972)
- La Nature de l'histoire (1974).
- La stratégie de l'action (Paris : ED. DE L'AUBE, 1997)
