= David Eyton-Jones =

British SAS officer

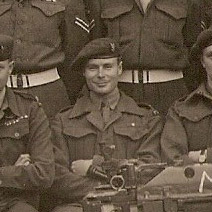
- Born: 8 March 1923; Forest Hill, Kent, England
- Died: 1 August 2012 (aged 88); Chidham, Sussex, England
- Military career
- Relatives: Hugh Eyton-Jones (grandfather); Thomas Eyton-Jones (great grandfather); John Eyton-Jones (great uncle); William Eyton-Jones (cousin)
- Allegiance: United Kingdom
- Branch: (United Kingdom) British Army
- Service years: 1944-1947
- Rank: Captain
- Units: Royal Sussex Regiment; Special Air Service
- Conflicts: World War II; Italian Campaign; Palestine Emergency

Captain Arthur David Eyton-Jones (8 March 1923 – 1 August 2012) was a British Army officer with the Special Air Service (SAS) during World War II, director of a tea company, landscape gardener and chaplain. He is best known for his involvement in Operation Tombola.

== Early life ==
Eyton-Jones was born on 8 March 1923 in Forest Hill, Kent, England. He is a grandson of the Reverend Hugh Eyton-Jones, a great-grandson of Dr Thomas Eyton-Jones, and a great-grandson of Sir John Aird, 1st Baronet. He was educated at Monkton Combe School in Somerset.

=== World War II ===
In September 1939, when David was 16 years old, he heard Neville Chamberlain's announcement of the declaration of war with Germany in the drawing room of his great-aunt Gertrude Aird's mansion, Sheepcote Manor, in Buckinghamshire. She was the daughter of Sir John Aird, 1st Baronet. After the outbreak of World War II David was asked to return to Monkton Combe School to take part in Home Guard duties. Following this in 1940 Eyton-Jones started university at Jesus College, Cambridge, reading Agriculture. Drafting began after five terms and he enrolled in the army at the end of 1942.

In April 1944, following basic and officer cadet training in North Wales, David was commissioned into the Royal Sussex Regiment where he commanded 30 infantrymen. In the summer of that year he embarked on a troopship 'The Empress of Scotland' for Italy which was part of a convoy from Gourock, near Glasgow, to Naples via Oran, using an indirect fluctuating route to avoid the danger of German U-boat attacks. The stormy weather reduced the risk from U-boats but resulted in seasickness on board. Some time in Autumn 1944 the convoy reached Oran, where there was significant bomb damage before docking at Naples, which appeared comparatively peaceful. Eyton-Jones was unable to locate his regiment, who had been transferred to Greece and instead chose to volunteer for Special Operations with the 2nd SAS Regiment.

== Special Air Service ==
=== Operation Tombola ===
The northern part of the Apennine Mountains were targeted by Special Operations Executive, who planned to attack the German forces from behind their lines. The operation, code-named Operation Tombola was led by Major Roy Farran. David was chosen for this mission and undertook two weeks of training. On 7 March 1945 Eyton-Jones and two other SAS troops parachuted behind enemy lines from a Dakota C-47 Skytrain. This night time parachute descent into enemy held territory was his first parachute jump and he faced freezing temperature and mountainous terrain conditions. Farran called for Eyton-Jones and a guardsman called Russel Kershaw enquiring about their experience with snow. Because Eyton-Jones had skied in Switzerland and Kershaw had experience bob-sleighing, they were offered the positions. Farran was to lead an attack on two villas used as German headquarters in Botteghe d'Albinea, in the hills above Reggio Emilia on the night of 27 March. Eyton-Jones and Kershaw were given orders to route an escape for all British soldiers from the Tombola Valley after the attack. The main intention was to avoid 'rastrellamento', meaning 'search and round-up', or being press ganged to work for the Nazis following any attack on the German corps headquarters.

Eyton-Jones and Kershaw made a return to their landing site, Case Balocchi locating a guide who took them to Monte Cusna, a 2,500-metre-high (8,200 ft) mountain range. Unlike the 50 British soldiers, the guide was equipped with skis, sticks and snow goggles, an offer to look for supplies for their unit was refused by Eyton-Jones as he knew they needed too many. It took a day to reach the Rifugio mountain hut. On noticing the door was difficult to open they realised that snow had drifted into the hut through a grate on the eastern wall. The fire had been incapacitated and there were no logs to burn anyway, so they ate self heating tins of soup and laid their sleeping bags on top of the snow pile, keeping their boots on. During the night their sleeping bags melted the snow and they sank into the pit, creating the illusion that they were in graves. They took an amphetamine pharmaceutical called Benzedrine in tablet form. Eyton-Jones suffered Photokeratitis, a temporary blindness caused by sunlight reflecting from the snow. Eyton-Jones and Kershaw concluded that the mountain escape route was too challenging to be functional for the British to use as an escape route. They descended the mountain by sliding on their backsides. Kershaw's bobsleigh experience meant he went first, using his heels to steer between boulders. They reached relatively flat ground and recognised that their feet were black and one of Kershaw's feet had been injured by colliding with a boulder.

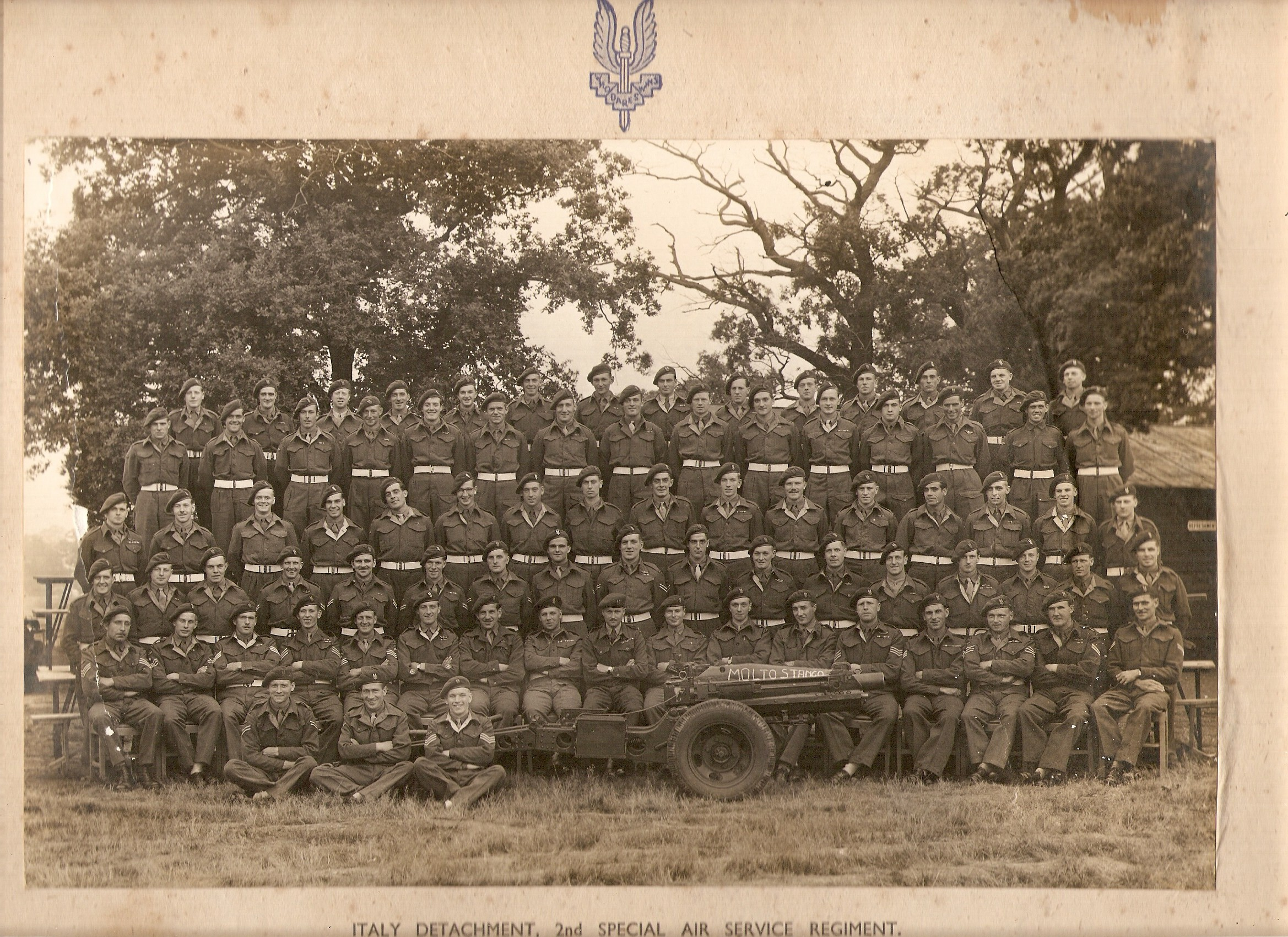
Official British Army photograph of Italy Detachment 2nd SAS Regiment, 1945.

Unable to unfasten their boot laces they walked towards Febbio in order to find Special Operations Executive agent Mike Lees, a member of their team. He had already left and was on his way to the attack at Botteghe d'Albinea in the hills above Reggio Emilia so Eyton-Jones and Kershaw were compelled to walk five miles back to the village of Quara. Frostbite made this walk very painful. It took six months for Eyton-Jones' feet to recover from this ordeal.

On meeting with Farran and delivering the news about the inappropriate escape route it was decided that due to Eyton-Jones' bad feet he should be in charge of some jeeps mounted with Vickers machine guns. Air drops had been made to supply weapons for the British, who had joined with a local Italian faction and seventy Russian soldiers, led by Victor Pirogov, a lieutenant in the Red Army who had escaped from a Prisoner of War camp. Four jeeps were dropped near the village of Quara using large parachutes. One vehicle had become wrapped in the chute while falling and was destroyed, but weapons were provided by further air drops for the British force who linked up with local Italian partisans and the group of escaped Russians. This collective attacked convoys and raided the German 51 Corps Headquarters based at two villas in the Tuscan Apennines. Other duties included blocking roads, and firing upon a number of installations.

A couple of days later some US aircraft was seen to have been hit by enemy fire. The crew bailed out and on seeing the parachutes, Eyton-Jones and an Italian Quartermaster known only as 'Barba Nera' (original real name Annibale Alpi), meaning Black Beard, boarded a jeep and drove towards their landing place, rescuing them from a German soldiers in a Volkswagen who were cut off from capturing the Americans by a river. Barba Nera escorted the recovered soldiers to a farmhouse where they stayed hidden with six other crew members who had found the hideout until the end of the war.

=== Po Valley ===
In April 1945, Roy Farran called a meeting for all British officers following a radio message from the Special Operations Executive and Allied Forces Advance Headquarters in Florence. It was a directive for continuing assaults to be made on German communication lines to coincide with the spring offensive by the Allies. It was ordered that jeeps and a mountain Howitzer were to be brought down into the foothills overlooking the Po Valley. The assigned commander of the Italian company of 50 partisans wasn't proving popular, so Eyton-Jones was reallocated to take over. In addition a British Corporal assisted, with a Spanish SAS member for interpretation.

The target for the Italian Company was instructed to attack German transport on Route 12, a route leading over the mountains between two villages, Pavullo and Monte Fiorino. This was the location of a staging post called Montebonello. Eyton-Jones navigated the Italians to a position less than 5 miles of Route 12 progressing crosscountry towards the main road, avoiding Montebonello. It was overgrown, so the large group of soldiers alerted dogs in some farmhouses. Upon reaching the main road they located undercover for two hours on both sides of the road. No convoys appeared, so the troops fell back and headed towards their transitory HQ before sunrise. It was determined that excessive noise was impossible to avoid with such a large group, so the next night, an SAS veteran called Corporal Ford was instructed to move out a smaller party. Through using an alternative route they saw a column of German vehicles and horse-drawn transport making a northward retreat along Route 12. The unit opened fire with machine guns and rifles, destroying a number of vehicles. Their task complete, the unit withdrew using the fastest route which passed close to Montebonello, where they had been previously fired upon but made a successful escape nevertheless.

A daylight reconnaissance was made by Eyton-Jones the following day, towards a hill 800 yards adjacent to Montebonello. Compass bearings were taken on Montebonello church spire where it was suspected there was a German observation post thanks to visible wireless aerials. After dark, machine guns with ammunition belts loaded with tracer, armour piercing, and high explosive rounds were transported on mules to Monteforco where they aimed at the previously registered compass points. The order was given to fire until all ammunition was exhausted. Return fire began as Eyton-Jones and his company disengaged and continued for a mile until sunrise. David gathered the company with those who were left behind and started advancing towards Po valley where the remaining German convoys were observed driving north in retreat.

During this German retreat, Eyton-Jones lead a force of 50 partisans in Sassuolo city when some tracked vehicles approached. The first was an American scout car, which Eyton-Jones approached with every gun aimed at him. When questioned in Italian Eyton-Jones responded in English, alerting the American officer the SAS had recovered the area two months ago. During the American advance, Eyton-Jones was required to bury the bodies of three colleagues who lost their lives during the operation (One of these was the basque 2nd SAS Member Justo Balerdi 'Roberto Bruce' killed in action 21 April 1945 on route 12 closed to Torre Maina (Modena) ), as well as disarming some of the Russian troops, still armed after taking part in the SAS operation. These Red Army soldiers had been conscripted by the Nazis when their homeland was invaded, but deserted the German army and resisted them as Partisans. Allied Command's orders, sent from Italy, following instructions directly from Winston Churchill, the Russians were disarmed and made their way from Italy to Russia by train. Many years later, Eyton-Jones was horrified to hear that on their arrival in Russia, they were shot on the orders of Stalin. Following the war, the SAS was disbanded and Eyton-Jones joined the 1st Battalion, the Royal Sussex Regiment as part of the occupying force in Italy.

== Royal Sussex Regiment ==
In 1947 the regiment boarded the 'City of Canterbury' at Venice heading for Port Said. Following this they departed for the British Mandate in Palestine for a six-month tour of duty, based north of Gaza. During this time there were Jewish terror groups active against British troops, but despite the dangerous, hard work, Eyton-Jones made visits to Jerusalem and Bethlehem. While posted here, his commanding officer from his SAS days, Major Roy Farran was arrested for the murder of a 16 year old Jewish boy. He visited him he was on remand in a prison in Ramallah. He was guarded by troops of the Royal Sussex Regiment. Farran was later acquitted and went back to the UK.

== After the war ==
At Loxwood near Horsham, David started running a landscape gardening partnership. In 1949 Eyton-Jones married Diana, who he had met after the war. She had served with the Women's Auxiliary Air Force.

Following his partner contracting Tuberculosis, David sought new work, finding a contract as an Assistant Manager for a Tea Estate in Assam, India. As there was no telephones or television, all communication was made by telegram. A decline in profits lead to a manager retiring, so at the age of twenty-seven David became Manager, administering 750 acres for 11 years. His responsibilities included 750 employees and overseeing the infrastructure of this isolated community. There was a hospital, dispensary, two schools and onsite workers' houses. In 1962 the business was purchased by an Indian company who wished to employ an Indian manager, so David and Diana moved back to the UK. Here, David became employed by the Secretary of the Royal Forestry Society, managing the landscaping of industrial sites for Wealden Woodland, Godalming. Eyton-Jones served as Chaplain of the Chichester Branch of the Royal Sussex Regimental Association during his retirement.

Several books have been published after WW2, speaking about the 2nd SAS experience of David Eyton Jones during Operation Tombola. From "Winged Dagger" (1948) and "Operation Tombola" (1960) written by Roy Alexander Farran, to "Special Operation Executed" (1986) of Michaal Lees, then the Italian books "Il bracciale di sterline" (2011), "Il paradiso dei folli" (2014), "Il suonatore matto- the mad piper" (2017) all written by journalist and author Matteo Incerti. The latest one is "SAS Italian Job" written in 2018 by the English author Damien Lewis. Few weeks before his death, David Eyton Jones gave his last interview with the journalist Matteo Incerti. Eyton-Jones died in his sleep on 1 August 2012.

== See also ==
- Military history of Italy during World War II
- Special Air Service
- History of the Special Air Service
- List of former Special Air Service personnel
