= John Eyton-Jones =

Welsh physician and footballer

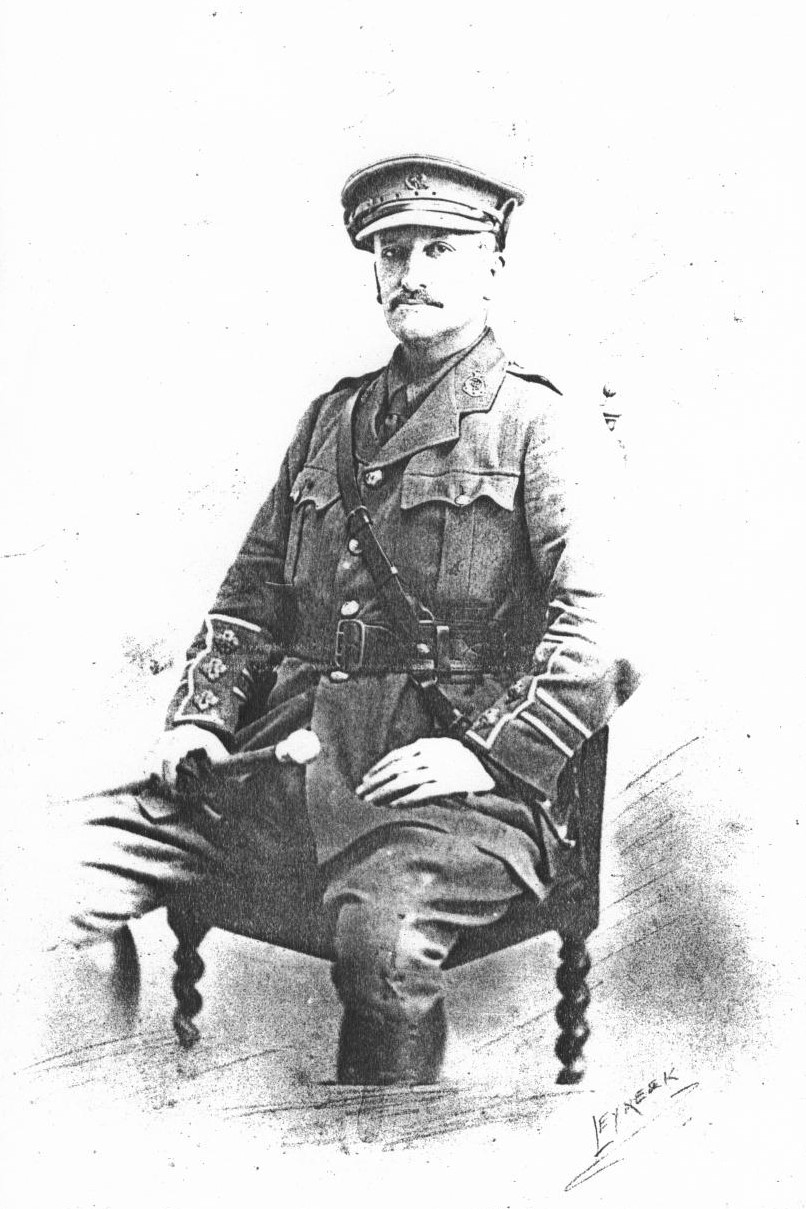
- Eyton-Jones circa 1914
- Born: John Arthur Eyton-Jones; 25 September 1862; Wrexham, Denbigshire, Wales
- Died: 3 March 1940 (aged 77); Birkenhead, Cheshire, England
Association football career
- Position: Forward
Youth career
- 1882: Wrexham Hare and Hounds Club
Senior career*
Years	Team	Apps	(Gls)
1883–1884	Wrexham Olympic		
1888	Everton	14	(2)
Total			(2)
International career
1883–1884	Wales	4	(1)
- * Club domestic league appearances and goals
- Military career
- Relatives: Thomas Eyton-Jones (father); Hugh Eyton-Jones (brother); William Eyton-Jones (nephew); David Eyton-Jones (nephew)
- Allegiance: United Kingdom
- Branch: (United Kingdom) British Army
- Service years: 1885–1918
- Rank: Captain
- Unit: Royal Army Medical Corps

John Arthur Eyton-Jones (25 September 1862 – 3 March 1940) was a Welsh footballer who played as a forward. He was part of the Wales national team between 1883 and 1884, playing four matches and scoring one goal. He played his first match on 17 March 1883 against Ireland and his last match on 29 March 1884 against Scotland.

== Early life ==
Eyton-Jones was born in Wrexham, Denbighshire, Wales, is a member of the Eyton-Jones family, and was an uncle of William Eyton-Jones. He was educated at the Grove Park School in Wrexham where he was a younger contemporary of Robert Armstrong-Jones.

== Sporting and football career ==
Eyton-Jones played football with the Wrexham Hare and Hounds Club.

He was part of the Wales national football team between 1883 and 1884, playing four matches and scoring one goal. He played his first match on 17 March 1883 against Ireland and his last match on 29 March 1884 against Scotland.

He also played for Everton in 1888.

== Military service ==
Eyton-Jones served as a medical officer in the 1st Volunteer Battalion of the Royal Welsh Fusiliers, and saw action in World War I as a Captain with the Royal Army Medical Corps.

== Personal life ==
Eyton-Jones worked as a local doctor and surgeon in the Wrexham area and lived at Abbotsfield on Grosvenor Road. This elegant neo-gothic Grade II Listed house was designed by architect James Reynolds Gummow of the Wrexham architect family in the 1860s as a private residence, and was purchased by Eyton-Jones in 1895.

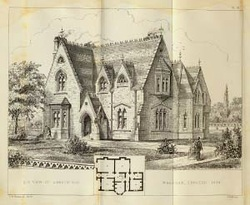
Abbotsfield.

He married twice, firstly in 1890 to Annie Isabella Shand Stodart-Milne. They had a daughter Margaret Susannah Maurice Eyton-Jones. Annie died in 1908 aged 38. Eyton-Jones married again in 1909 to Marie Anne Jones, a State Registered Nurse. Their son Arthur Paget Eyton-Jones was born in 1920.

Eyton-Jones, latterley a house surgeon at Liverpool Royal Infirmary, died at Birkenhead in March 1940. Following a service at St Paul's Church, Tranmere, he was buried at Wrexham Cemetery.

== See also ==
- List of Wales international footballers (alphabetical)
