= Emmi Bonhoeffer =

Wife of anti-Hitler activist Klaus Bonhoeffer (1905–1991)

Emmi Bonhoeffer

Emilie Amalie Charlotte "Emmi" Bonhoeffer (née Delbrück; 13 May 1905, Berlin – 12 March 1991, Düsseldorf) was the wife of anti-Hitler activist Klaus Bonhoeffer and sister-in-law of theologian, Dietrich Bonhoeffer. She married Bonhoeffer on 3 September 1930.

Klaus was chief counsel of the Lufthansa Airline Company and was the leading civilian member of the military resistance to the Hitler regime. While occupied with raising their children, Emmi supported her husband's decision to oppose Nazism, assisting him on countless occasions both morally and practically. Her husband was arrested in October 1944 in connection with the plot to kill Hitler. He was sentenced to death in February 1945, and killed by the SS as the war was ending on 23 April 1945.

Emmi barely escaped her own death when her house was destroyed in the last days of the war. She moved with her children to Schleswig-Holstein to start a new life in June 1945. She was active in projects aiding war refugees, as well as anti-Nazi educational work and various humanitarian efforts.

Emmi Bonhoeffer was also the author of Auschwitz Trials: Letters from an eyewitness.

She was the sister of biophysicist Max Delbrück.

Bonhoeffer was interviewed for the British 1970s documentary series The World At War. In episode 16 of the series, Inside the Reich: Germany (1940–1944), she spoke in English about awareness of the persecution of the Jews in the Reich and the difficulty of confronting the issue:

We felt that people should know what was going on; and maybe typical is this little experience which I had one day, standing in the line for vegetables or something like that. I told my neighbours standing around me that "Now, they start to kill the Jews in the concentration camps, and it is NOT true that they only are brought there and can live there as they live here," as it was told to them. "They are killed, and they even make soap out of them; I know that."

And they said, "Frau Bonhoeffer, if you don't stop telling such horror stories, you will end [up] in a concentration camp too, and nobody of us can help you. It's not true, what you are telling; you shouldn't believe these things. You have them from the foreign broadcasts or so, and they tell these things to make enemies against Germany." I'd say, "No, it's not from broadcasts; I know that directly...first-hand. You can be sure, it is that way."

And coming home, I told that [to] my husband in the evening, and he was not at all applauding to me—on the very contrary. He said, "My dear, [I'm] sorry to say, but you are absolutely idiotic [in] what you are doing. Please understand: A dictatorship is like a snake. If you put your foot on its tail, as you do it, it will just bite you, and nobody will be helped. You have to strike the head."
